= Air14 =

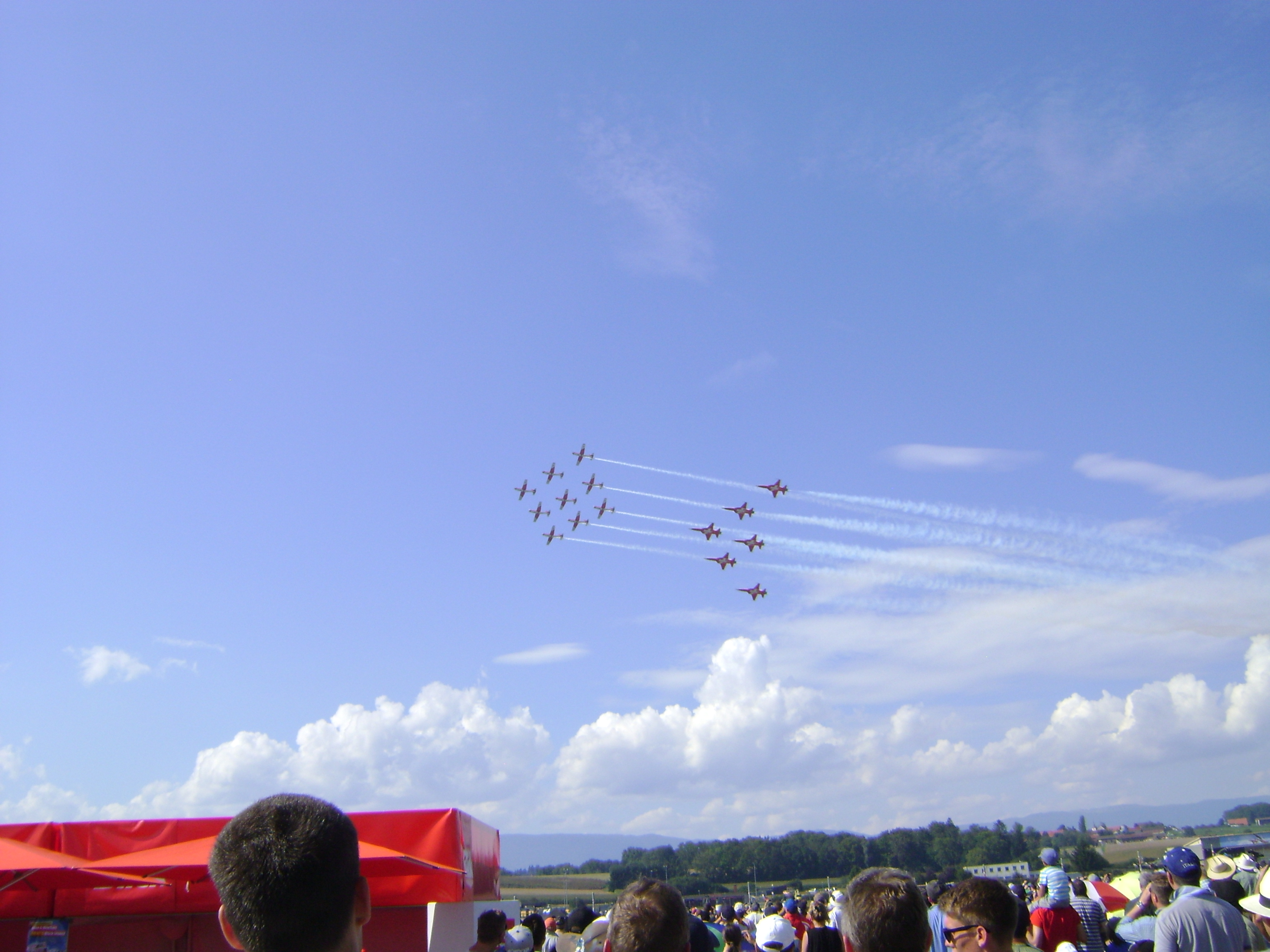
Patrouille Suisse and PC-7 Team

Air14, also named 100 years Swiss Air Force was an international air show held by the Swiss Air Force in late August and early September 2014 at Payerne Air Base, Switzerland. It claimed to be the biggest airshow in Europe of 2014.

== History ==
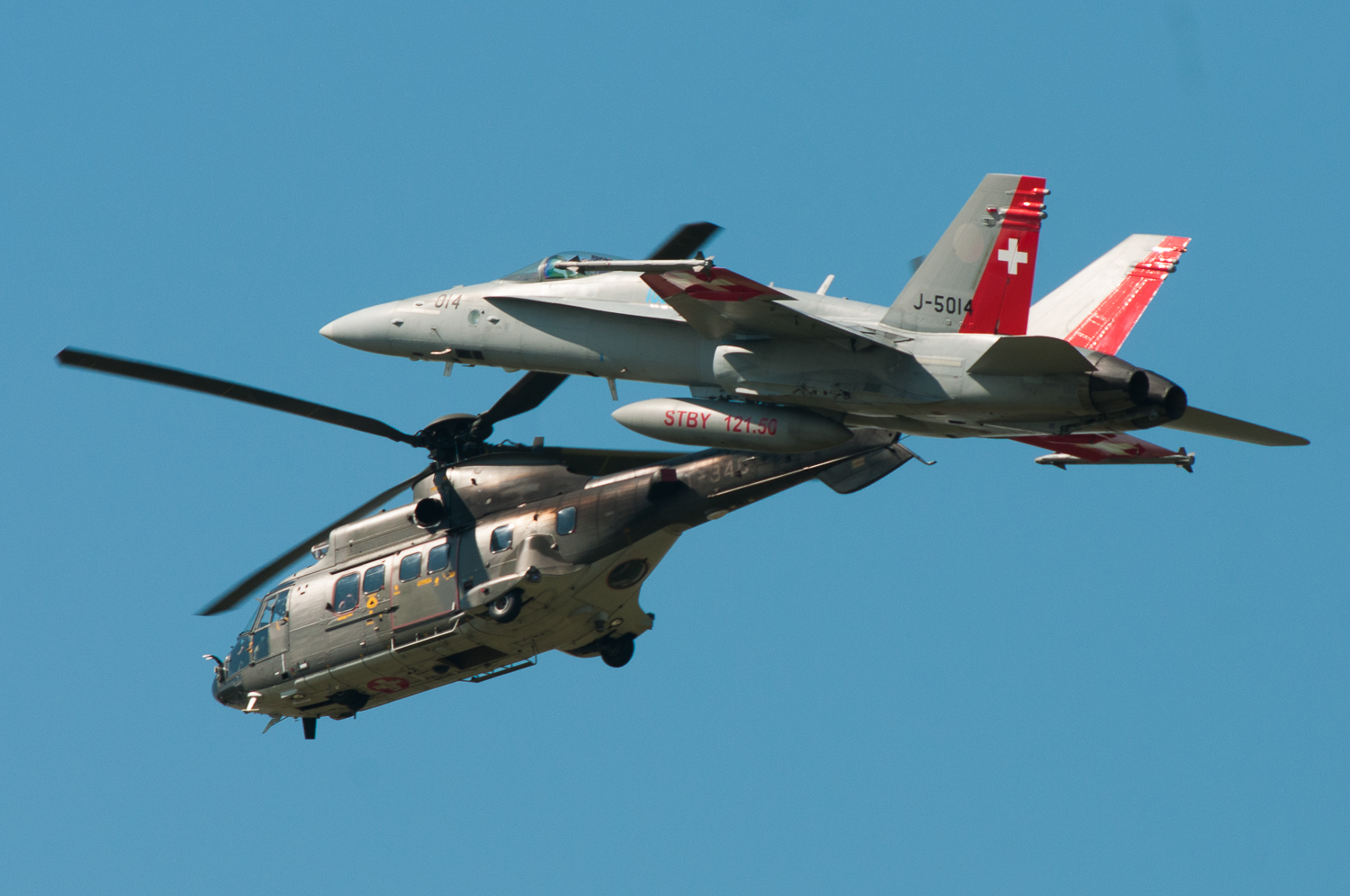
Cougar and F/A-18C J-5014 at the Air14 air show

Until 1991, when Switzerland celebrated its 700th formation jubilee, most Swiss airshows had been organized by civilians. Prior to that year, the Swiss Air Force participated in various military and civilian events only. There were no regular airshows organized by the military except one yearly open day at Dübendorf Air Base during the Air Force Flight Competitions (Armeeflugmeisterschaften) and small partly public open doors designated to airmen family members in the militia of Switzerland's recruits training. Notable demonstrations were held in 1974 at Dübendorf, Payerne and Locarno, commemorating 50 years of military flying, attracting 100,000 people at Dübendorf. Private organizers also introduced foreign military aircraft, such as the Harrier during the Flying Days in Bex and several airshows at Sion Airport 1982, 1986, 1989 and 1997.

After the end of the Cold War, invitations were sent to former Eastern bloc countries for and during the first airshow in Payerne held 1991, on the occasion of 700 years of Switzerland and 50 years of Ueberwachungsgeschwader (Surveillance Squadron), where Mi-24 Hind helicopters were flown at the show as well as the United States Air Force Thunderbirds demonstration team. During Air94 on 26 and 27 August 1994, Patrouille Suisse celebrated its 30th anniversary using the Hawker Hunter jet. At the peak of this event, a formation flight of 40 Hunters marked its withdrawal from service.

Decision was made to hold one airshow per decade. Therefore, the following show took place as Air04 on 4 and 5 September 2004, commemorating 90 years of military aviation and 40 years of Patrouille Suisse at Payerne airbase. Some 275,000 people visited the military spectacle involving 186 aircraft, highlighted by an unusual joint flight of five aerobatics teams.

The next airshow due in 2014 provided several jubilees such as the Swiss Air Force's centenary, 50 years of Patrouille Suisse and PC-7 Team celebrating its 25th anniversary. It was also decided to keep the airshow open every day for a two weeks period, involving a reduced demonstration programme during the week and comprehensive static display for all interested parties. In the end, Air14 lasted 10 days in total with the Swiss display teams flying one demonstration per day at least. Air24 never took place due to costs.

== Planning and organization ==
The planning for the Air14 started in 2009 with the approval of the then Defense Minister Ueli Maurer, head of the army André Blattmann and the then commanding officer of the Swiss Air Force, Markus Gygax. Ian Logan, who was already responsible for the Air04, was appointed General Director for the Air14. The opening ceremony of the Air14 was held by the new commander of the Swiss Air Force, Aldo C. Schellenberg, together with Doris Leuthard, responsible for the department of civil aviation.

The Swiss Air Force had various partners for the airshow. These were, among others:Civil defense, Swiss Red Cross, Federal Office of Civil Aviation, Cantonal police Vaud, Cantonal police Canton of Fribourg, REGA, Swiss Federal Railways, Switzerland Tourism, Feldpost (Swiss Army), Fliegermuseum Altenrhein, Flieger-Flab-Museum, Musée de l’aviation militaire de Payerne, Télévision Suisse Romande.

A transport concept had been developed with three parking areas close to the motorway exit Payerne and near the two adjacent motorway exits from where a free shuttle bus service was provided. The Swiss Federal Railways made special trains available for the Airshow. The airshow was broadcast live by the Télévision Suisse Romande and also shown as live-streaming on YouTube. Since the airshow had to be self-sustaining, on the one hand an admission fee had to be paid, on the other hand the fuel was from the regular annual quota of the Swiss Air Force's fuelstock. In return for their support, the sponsors Henniez and Nestlé had the supply monopoly for food and drinks, but the local business was also taken into account. The Militärflugplatz Emmen acted as an alternate airbase and as a base for various Swiss aircraft, which performed demonstrations at the Airshow. The Swiss Federal Railways were responsible for the online sale of tickets and combined railway/entry tickets.

== Speciality ==
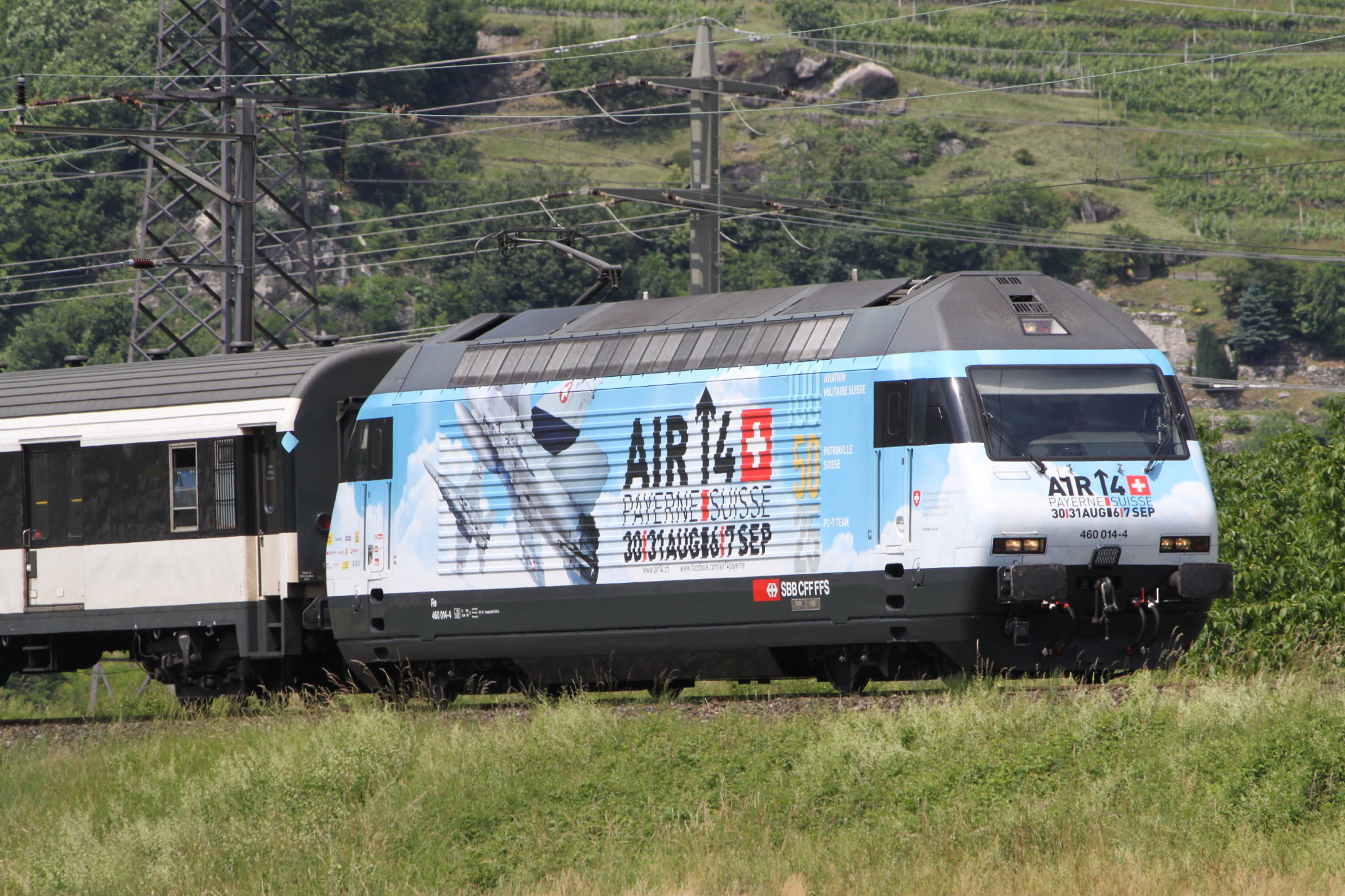
SBB locomotive of the series Re 460 with special painting Air14

The Swiss Federal Railways (SBB) provided a Re 460 locomotive with a livery painting for the Air14. The Swiss Post also painted a Postautobus in a special finish for the Air14 and issued two special stamps for this occasion. Swissmint issued a special coin for the 50th anniversary of Patrouille Suisse.

For the Air14 various airworthy oldtimers received a painting that corresponded to that of the aircraft type in the service of the Swiss Air Force. The F/A-18C Hornet J-5014 received a color similar to that of Swiss Air Force aircraft in the Second World War. The J-5014 flew displays alone, or in a pair with the Morane HB-RCF (J-143), which bore the neutrality sheme which consisted in additional red and white stripes. Other couples were the F/A-18C J-5014 with a Cougar or Super Puma with special painting of the Air Transport Squadron 4 (Lufttransportstaffel 4).

The PC-7 team presented a unique flight demonstration on September 7, 2014, when they presented a flight demonstration together with the Patrouille Suisse with a total of 15 aircraft. A Boeing B-17 and the Morane, a historical event of the Second World War was displayed, when the bomber led to Dübendorf wasn't ready for its belly landing, turned away for a holding and was shot down because it seemed to try to escape. With Claude Nicollier and Chris Austin Hadfield, astronauts were also involved in the Air14. The Air14 had its own official song: One Hundred Years. Singer was the F/A-18 pilot "Jason" Stucki.

The Air14 was awarded a "Platinum Award" by the International Council of Air Shows (ICAS) in December 2014 for the diverse flight program with the lively and dynamic presentation of 100 years of military air travel and the future-oriented transport and environmental concept.

== Topics ==
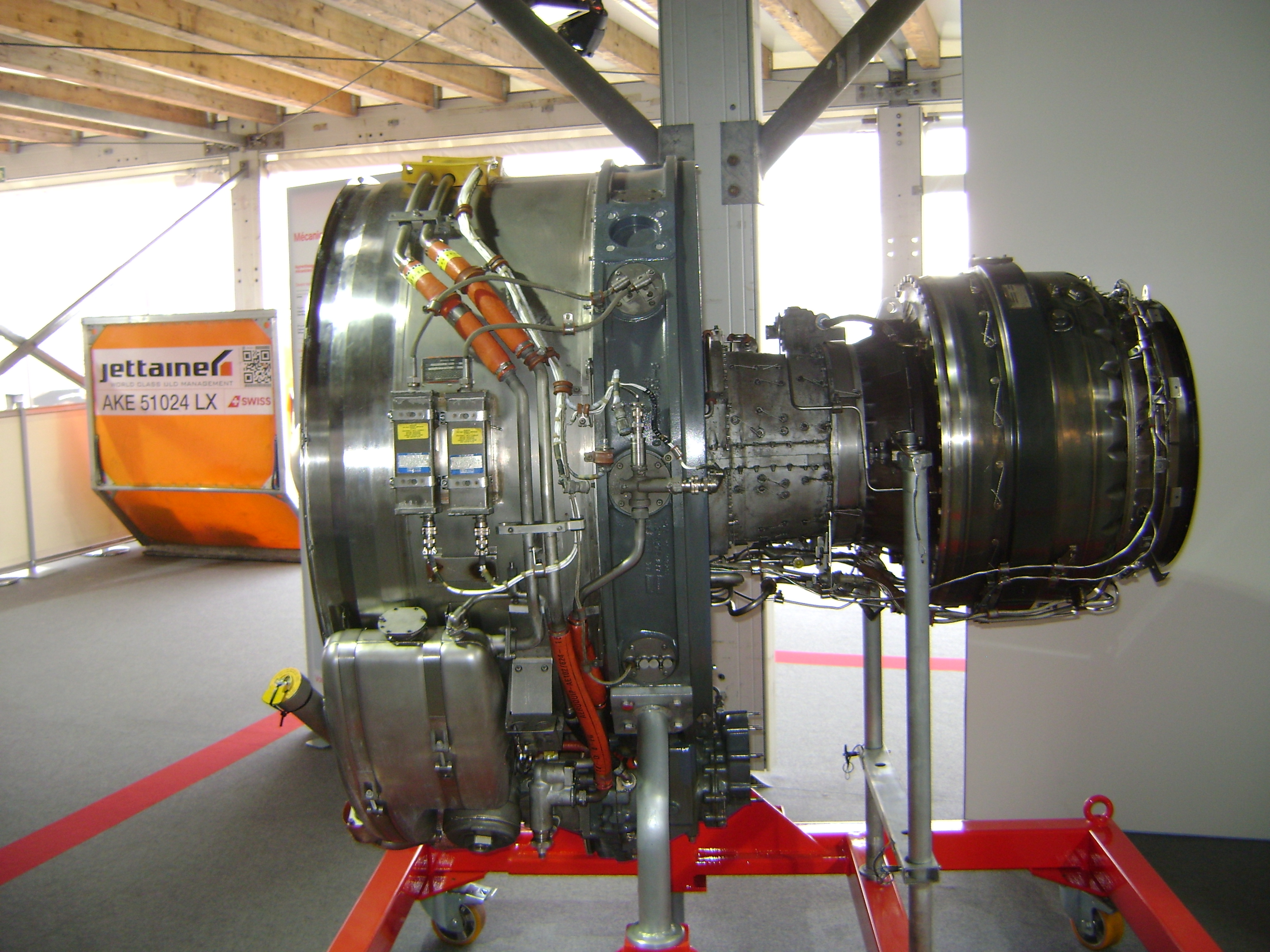
Avro-Engine at the Swiss International Air Lines Ltd Exhibition chalet

Swiss Air Force Morane D-3801 "shoots down" a B-17)

The flying program was designed to be versatile for visitors who visited the event only one day, as well as for visitors who followed the program on all four main days. Each of these days should show a broad spectrum of the Swiss military aviation from the founding years to the present, as well as individual demonstrations, team demonstrations and special acts for the anniversary. Therefore, the program was subdivided into "Teams", "Jets", "Oldtimer Jets", "Propeller aircraft", "Helicopters", "Special demonstrations" and "Tribute 100 Years Military aviation". Each of these days had a theme and a color as well as a leitmotiv.

- Saturday August 30, 2014 The Sky Outwatch (Green) – Reconnaissance in the past, today and the future.
- Sunday 31 August 2014 Above the Battlefilds (Amber) – Air to ground in the past, today and the future.
- Saturday 6 September 2014 The Spirit of Air Defense (Cyan) – Air Defense in the past, today and the future.
- Sunday September 7, 2014 Heavy Metal and Evolution (Purple) – Innovation and Air Transport in the past, today and the future.

The days between the weekends were also public. Some days had a focus on specific visitors, so they were designed for school classes, for people with disabilities and for various companies.

One of the tasks of Air14 was to show the visitors the professions in the Swiss Military and in the aviation industry of Switzerland. Therefore, the Swiss Military had set up tents in which the various (teaching) professions were shown. For this purpose, companies participating in Swiss aviation were also involved in the exhibition. These were, among others, the Swiss International Air Lines, Skyguide, REGA, RUAG, Pilatus Aircraft. In addition, various sections of the military and their tasks were presented to the visitors in static exhibitions. Such as the Military police, EOD, Swissint, CBRN defense. In addition to flying equipment, the Swiss Air Force was also present with ground-based systems such as the TAFLIR, IFAS- Comunicationsbeam- Piranha, FIM-92 Stinger, Oerlikon GDF mm with fire control unit Skyguard and RAPIER. The army was present with the Armoured recovery vehicle Buffalo, Leopard 2, M109, M113, Mowag Eagle, Mowag Piranha IB 6 × 6, Mowag Piranha 8x8, Mowag Duro GMTF, CV9030CH, Mobile Bridge and Mobile Rollway.

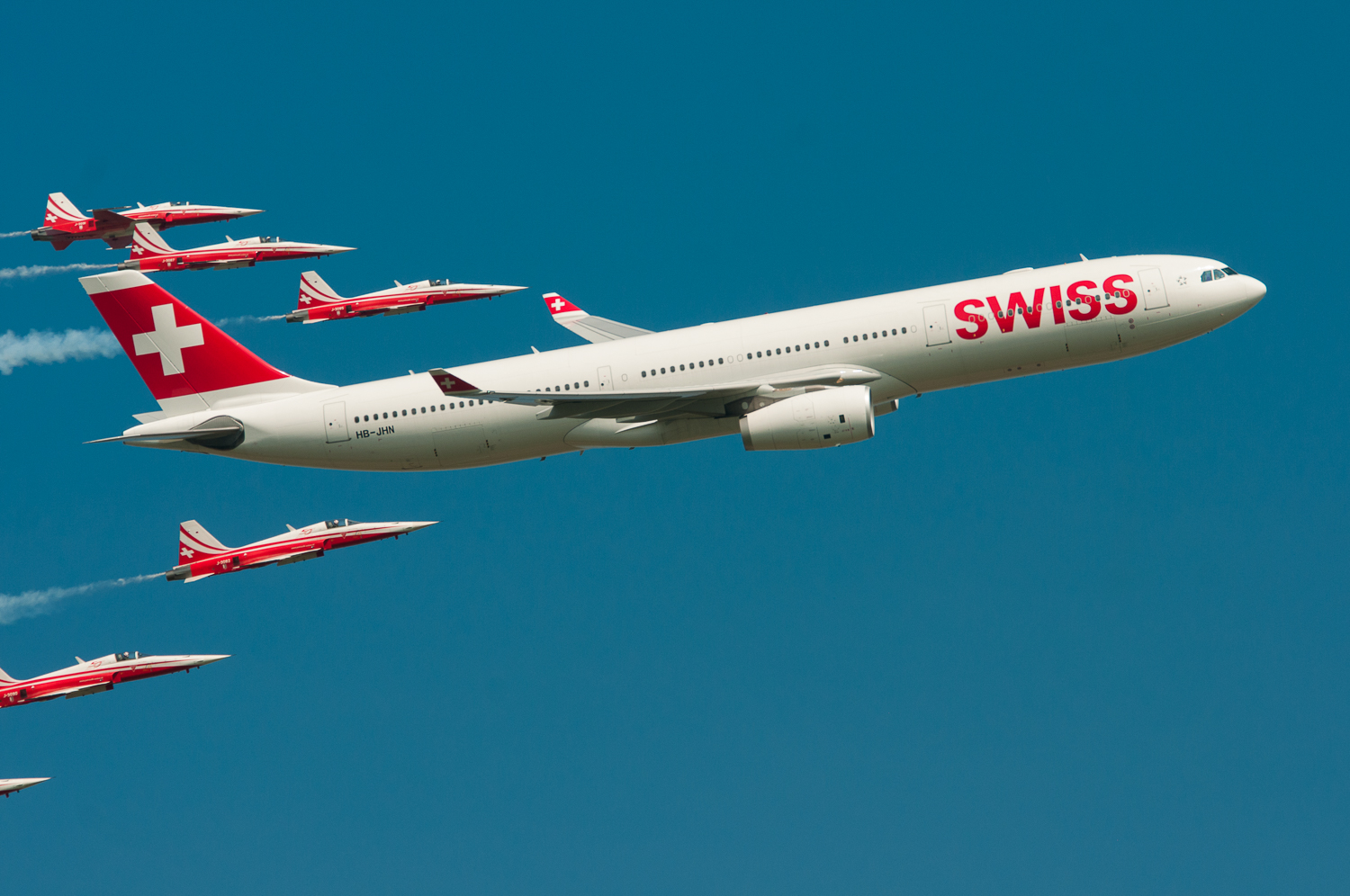
Patrouille Suisse and Swiss A-330

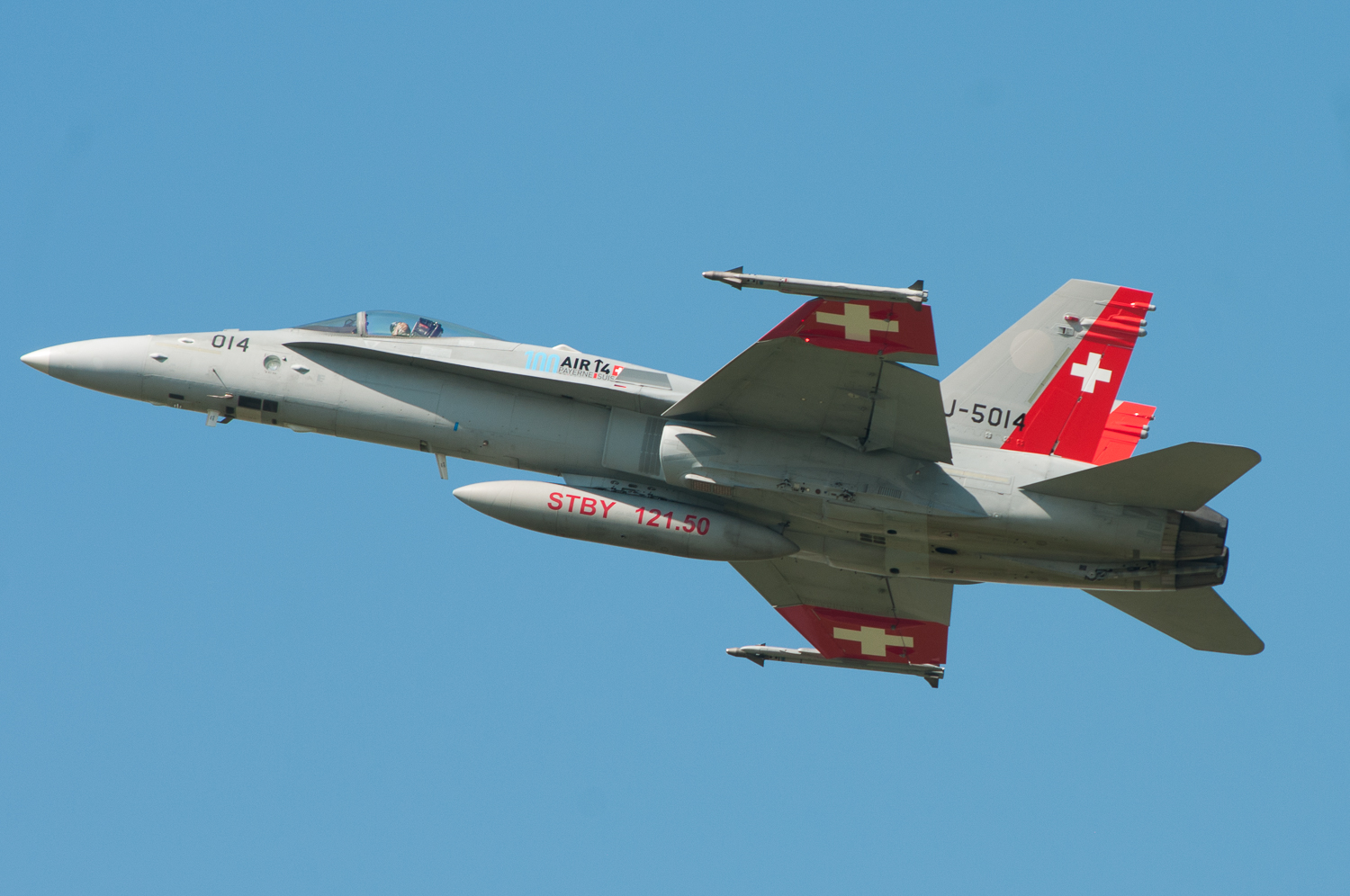
F/A-18C J-5014 flew in a painting that corresponded to that of the Swiss aircraft of the Second World War

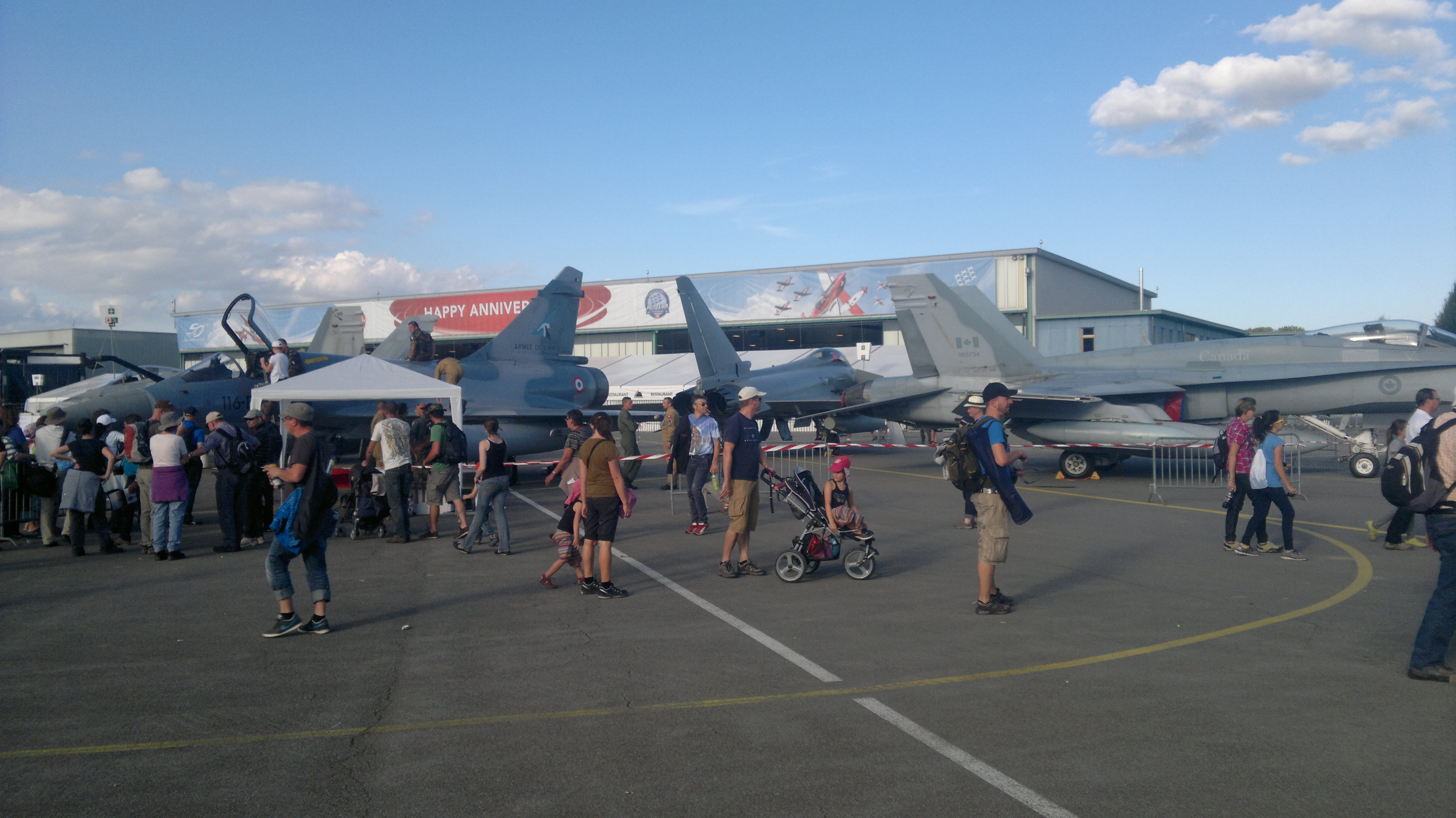
On the right a Canadian F/A-18A, on the left a French Mirage 2000, in between an Austrian Eurofighter

== Program ==
At the Air14 various aircraft were shown both statically as well as in the flying display. Various aircraft dated from 1914 to 2014 including fighters, bombers, helicopters and experimental aircraft. Several former and current types of the Swiss Air Force as well as a number of foreign air forces aircraft were present. In addition, various aerobatic teams joined the show:

| Aircraft | Country |
|---|---|
| Mirage 2000 Ramex Delta | France |
| Patrouille Suisse | Switzerland |
| PC-7 Team | Switzerland |
| Patrulla Águila | Spain |
| Patrouille de France | France |
| Breitling Jet Team | France |
| Wings of Storm | Croatia |
| Breitling Wingwalker | United Kingdom |
| Midnight Hawks | Finland |
| P3 Flyers | Switzerland |
| Royal Jordanian Falcons | Jordan |
| WeFly! Team | Italy |
| Al Fursan | United Arab Emirates |
| Frecce Tricolori | Italy |
| RAF Falcons | United Kingdom |
| Red Arrows | United Kingdom |
| F-16 Solo Display Team | Netherlands |

== Criticism ==
The Air14 was criticized in advance from anti-military organizations and politicians.

Due to the annexation of Crimea by the Russian Federation the invitation of the Russian aerobatics team Russian Knights was criticized. Four weeks before the Air14, the Swiss air Force's leadership were forced by the Federal Council to recall their invitation.

== Bibliography ==
- Magazine Air14 Histoire Hommage Innovation
- Schweizer Luftwaffe, Jahrespublikation (Annual publication) 2015, Page. 71
- Schweizer Luftwaffe, Jahrespublikation (Annual publication) 2014, Page. 9–11
- Magazine intra, 2/14, Page. 4–9
- Magazine armee.ch, 2/14, Page. 2–13
- Demonstration program Air14
