= Gygax =

Gygax is a German-language surname, mainly distributed in Switzerland. Gigas and Gygas are related surnames. It is a Grecianization of German surnames with the meaning of "giant", such as Riese, Reese, and Heune. Notable people with the surname include:

- Albert Friedrich Gygax (1896–1968), Swiss chemigrapher
- Daniel Gygax (born 1981), Swiss footballer
- Felix Gygax (1884–1977), American naval officer
- Gary Gygax (1938–2008), American writer and game designer
- Hansueli Gygax (1942–2017), Swiss handball player
- Jean-Louis Gygax (born 1935), Swiss footballer
- Jonas Gygax, Swiss Salvation Army soldier and musician
- Luke Gygax, American game designer, son of Gary
- Marc Domingo Gygax (born 1965), Spanish historian
- Markus Gygax (born 1950), commander of the Swiss Air Force
- Nicolas Gygax (born 1996), Swiss freestyle skier
- Pascal Gygax (born 1974), Swiss psycholinguist

== See also ==
- Johannes Gigas (1514–1581), German Protestant theologian, hymn writer, educator and Reformer
- Hans Gygas (1872–1963), German rear admiral
