= Christine Hug =

Swiss transgender military officer (1981–2023)

Lieutenant Colonel Christine Hug
- Born: 1981; Zürich, Switzerland
- Died: 10 July 2023 (aged 41–42)
- Military career
- Allegiance: Switzerland
- Branch: Swiss Army
- Service years: 2001–2023
- Rank: Lieutenant Colonel
- Commands: Panzer Battalion 12

Christine Hug (1981 – 10 July 2023) was a Swiss military officer. In September 2019, she became the first openly transgender officer in the Swiss Army. Hug commanded the Panzer Battalion 12, which consisted of almost one thousand soldiers.

== Early life ==
Hug was born in 1981 in Zürich. She studied military history in school.

== Career ==
Hug joined the Swiss Army at the age of twenty, eventually reaching the rank of Oberstleutnant (Lieutenant colonel) in the General Staff. She commanded the Panzer Battalion 12, consisting of seventy tanks and almost one thousand soldiers.

In March 2019, after informing the Chief of the Armed Forces Lieutenant General Philippe Rebord and Federal Councilor and Federal Department of Defense Head Viola Amherd, Hug came out as transgender, making her the first transgender officer in the Swiss Army. She then informed all members of the army whom she worked with, sending an email to seven hundred military staff. At the time that Hug came out, the Swiss Army considered transgender people to be medically unfit and would not consider them for military recruits. Hug advocated for women and transgender people to serve in the Swiss military.

== Personal life ==
Hug was married and had one daughter.

Hug was a transgender woman, and came out publicly in March 2020. Hug began hormone replacement therapy two years prior, in 2017. In 2018, she underwent gender-affirming surgery. She chose the name Christine after having a conversation with her parents, who said they would have named her that had she been assigned female at birth.

== Death ==
On 10 July 2023, Hug died in an accident. She had been preparing to go on a vacation to Hungary with her wife and daughter with their horses when she was killed. While loading the horses into a trailer, Hug fell backwards and hit her head. She was taken to a hospital by helicopter, where she died from her injuries.

After her death, President of the Swiss Officers' Society Dominik Knill, released a statement calling Hug a "loveable person and loyal comrade, but also a great and authentic representative of a pragmatic advancement of women in the army."
