= Israel–Switzerland relations =

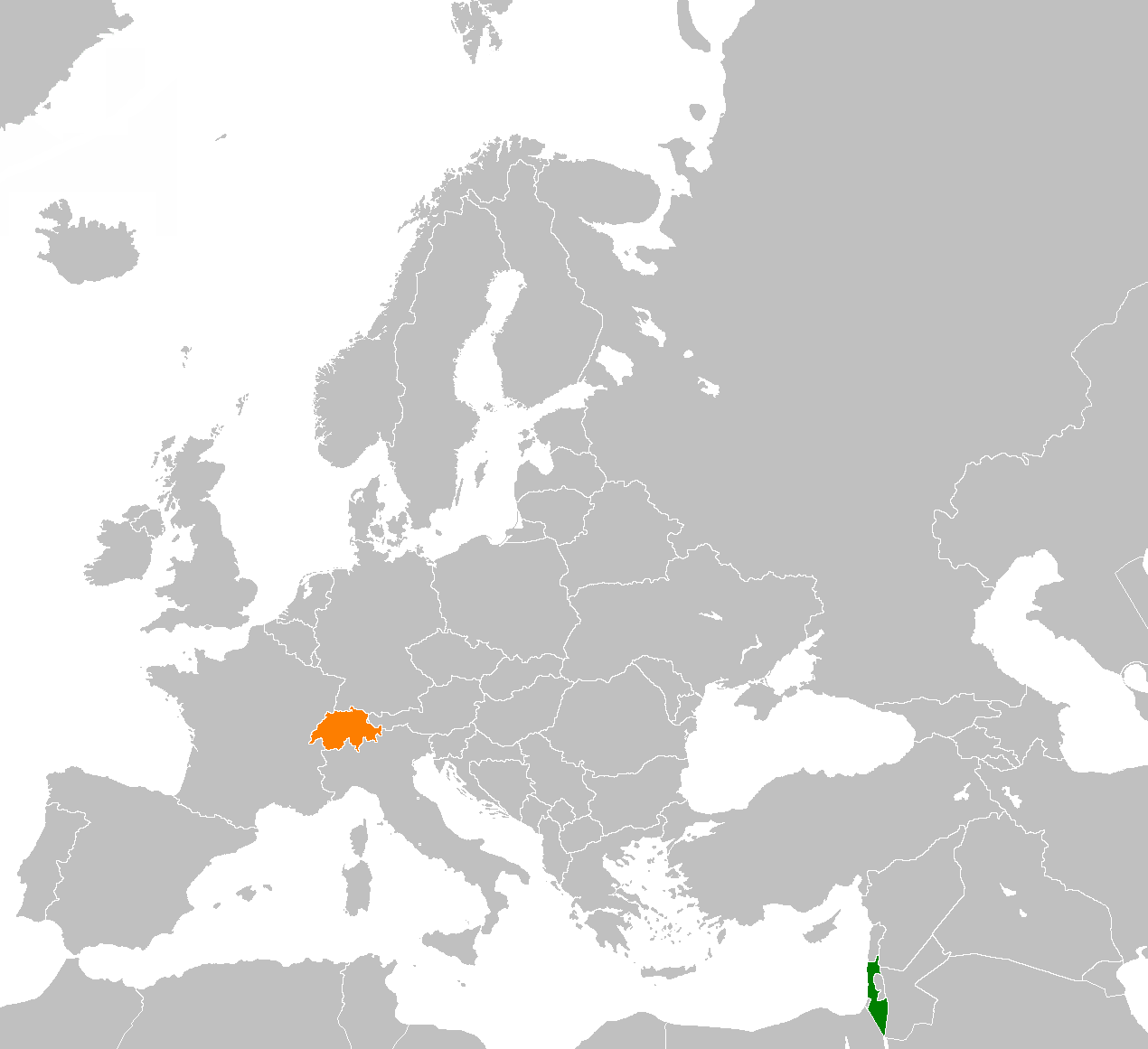
- Israel: Switzerland

Switzerland recognized Israel on January 25, 1949 and opened a consulate in Tel Aviv. Israel has an embassy in Bern. Since 1958, Switzerland has an embassy in Tel Aviv and an honorary consulate in Eilat.

Switzerland has historically supported a two-state solution on the basis of the 1967 borders, regarding the resolution of the Israel-Palestinian Conflict, a stance it reaffirmed in May 2024.

== History ==
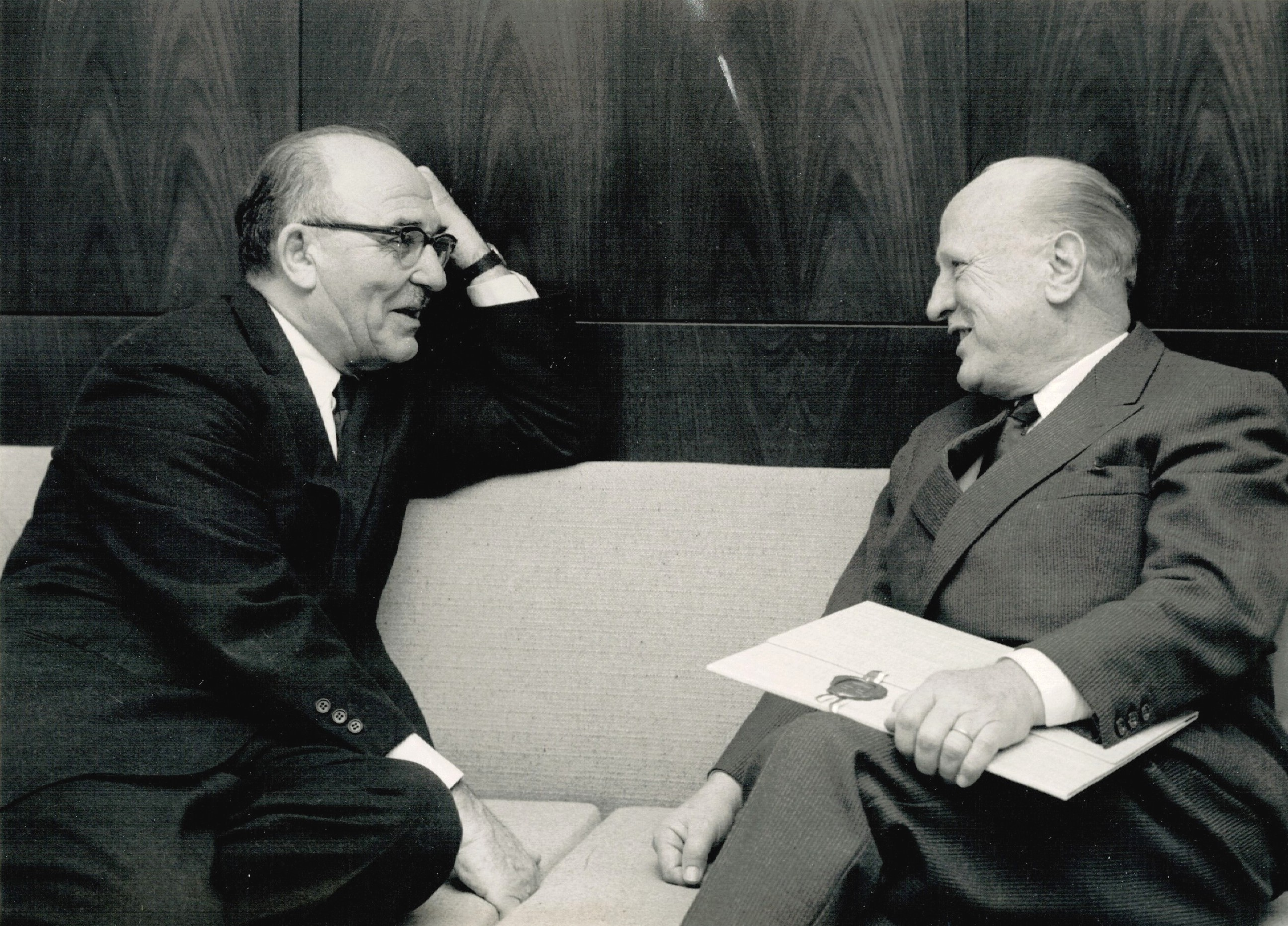
Prime Minister Levi Eshkol and Swiss ambassador Pierre Brugger, 1963.

The First Zionist Congress was held in Basel in 1897, and 15 out of a total of 22 congresses were held in Switzerland. Before the establishment of the State of Israel, Switzerland maintained a consulate in Jerusalem and a consular agency in Tel Aviv. It recognized the new state in 1949 and opened a consulate in Tel Aviv, which was upgraded to an embassy in 1958. The Swiss community in Israel is the largest in the Asian region, totalling around 12,000 persons.

After the escalation of the Middle East conflict, Switzerland halted arms sales and military cooperation with Israel from 2002 to 2005. Since 2004, there has been regular political dialogue between Switzerland and Israel.

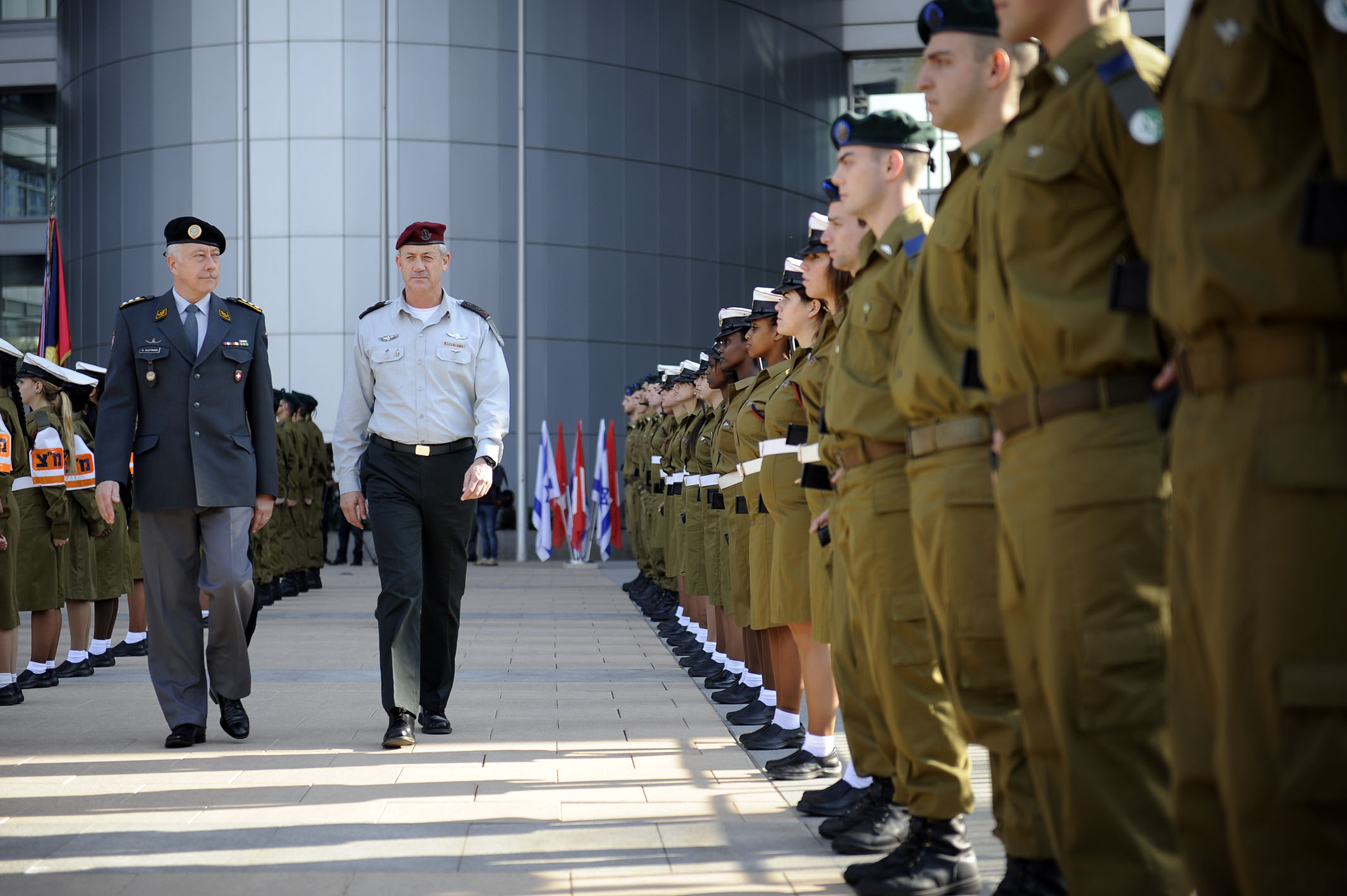
The Chief of the Swiss Armed Forces, André Blattmann, visiting Israel as a guest of IDF Chief of Staff Benny Gantz in 2011

Switzerland has represented Israel's interests in numerous countries (Hungary (1967–1989), Guinea (1967–1973), Ceylon/Sri Lanka (1970–1976), Madagascar (1973–1994), Liberia (1973–1983) and Ghana (1973–2002)). Conversely, it has represented the interests of Iran (1958–1987) and the Ivory Coast (1973–1986) in Israel. It also lobbied successfully for the inclusion of Magen David Adom in the Red Cross and Red Crescent movement.

On 21 April 2009, Israeli officials, angered by a meeting between Swiss President Hans-Rudolf Merz and the Iranian president, recalled its ambassador to Switzerland, Ilan Elgar, "for consultations" amid ongoing controversy over an anti-racism conference in Geneva, Switzerland.

In December 2014, Israel protested Switzerland's announcement that it will host a meeting of countries that have signed the Fourth Geneva Convention to discuss the situation of the Gaza Strip, the West Bank, and Jerusalem.

In October 2023, a Swiss military delegation under the leadership of Swiss Army chief Thomas Süssli had to interrupt the official visit to Israel and a meeting with Israeli army chief Herzi Halevi due to the unfolding Hamas-led attack on Israel. Swiss International Air Lines canceled all its flight to Tel Aviv. Switzerland criticised the attack and supports the peace keeping mission by the United Nations Truce Supervision Organization (UNTSO). The Swiss state police increased security measures at the embassy of Israel in Bern. In a statement made on 5 November 2023, the Swiss Foreign Ministry condemned "the killing of Palestinian civilians, including children, by Israeli air strikes on the Gaza Strip". In the same statement it also condemned the indiscriminate firing of rockets from Gaza into Israel. The Swiss Federal Council proposed banning Hamas in November 2023.

== Trade ==
The Israeli - Swiss trade is affected by the Free Trade Agreement between Israel and EFTA in which Switzerland is member state.

Israeli - Swiss trade in millions USD-$
	Israel imports Switzerland exports	Switzerland imports Israel exports	Total trade value
2023	4924.7	678.4	5603.1
2022	6089.2	1530.3	7619.5
2021	6618	742.9	7360.9
2020	5254.3	445.2	5699.5
2019	5618.8	1085.4	6704.2
2018	7757.2	1351.9	9109.1
2017	5528.7	1456.5	6985.2
2016	4288.1	1466.4	5754.5
2015	4425.9	1495.6	5921.5
2014	5190	1424.6	6614.6
2013	4397.4	1376	5773.4
2012	4055.4	1133	5188.4
2011	3970.2	1438.4	5408.6
2010	3220.2	1047.5	4267.7
2009	3290	942.3	4232.3
2008	3973.6	1210.4	5184
2007	2882.3	1036.1	3918.4
2006	2805.9	809	3614.9
2005	2464.7	900.3	3365
2004	2682.1	782.3	3464.4
2003	2062	504.9	2566.9
2002	2075.2	384.6	2459.8

== Other ==
More than 500 Swiss citizens are serving in the Israeli army according to IDF. Federal Swiss authorities say that they do not know the identities of these nationals serving under the Israeli flag.

== See also ==
- Foreign relations of Israel
- Foreign relations of Switzerland
- History of the Jews in Switzerland
- International recognition of Israel
