= Christophe Keckeis =

Swiss general (1945–2020)

- Born: 18 April 1945; Neuchâtel, Switzerland
- Died: 1 May 2020 (aged 75)
- Allegiance: Switzerland
- Branch: Swiss Air Force
- Rank: Lieutenant-General
- Commands: Swiss Air Force
- Education: University of Lausanne

Christophe Keckeis (18 April 1945 – 1 May 2020) was a Swiss Lieutenant-General. He headed the Swiss Army as "Chief of the General Staff" (2003) and then as "Chief of the Armed Forces" (2004–2007). He retired on 31 December 2007.

- On 24 March 1977, two Mirage III (J-2003 and J-2310) collided during a formation flight over the Payerne airfield. All parties involved survived the collision, including the then commander-in-chief of the Fliegerstaffel 17, Christophe Keckeis.

== Decorations and awards ==
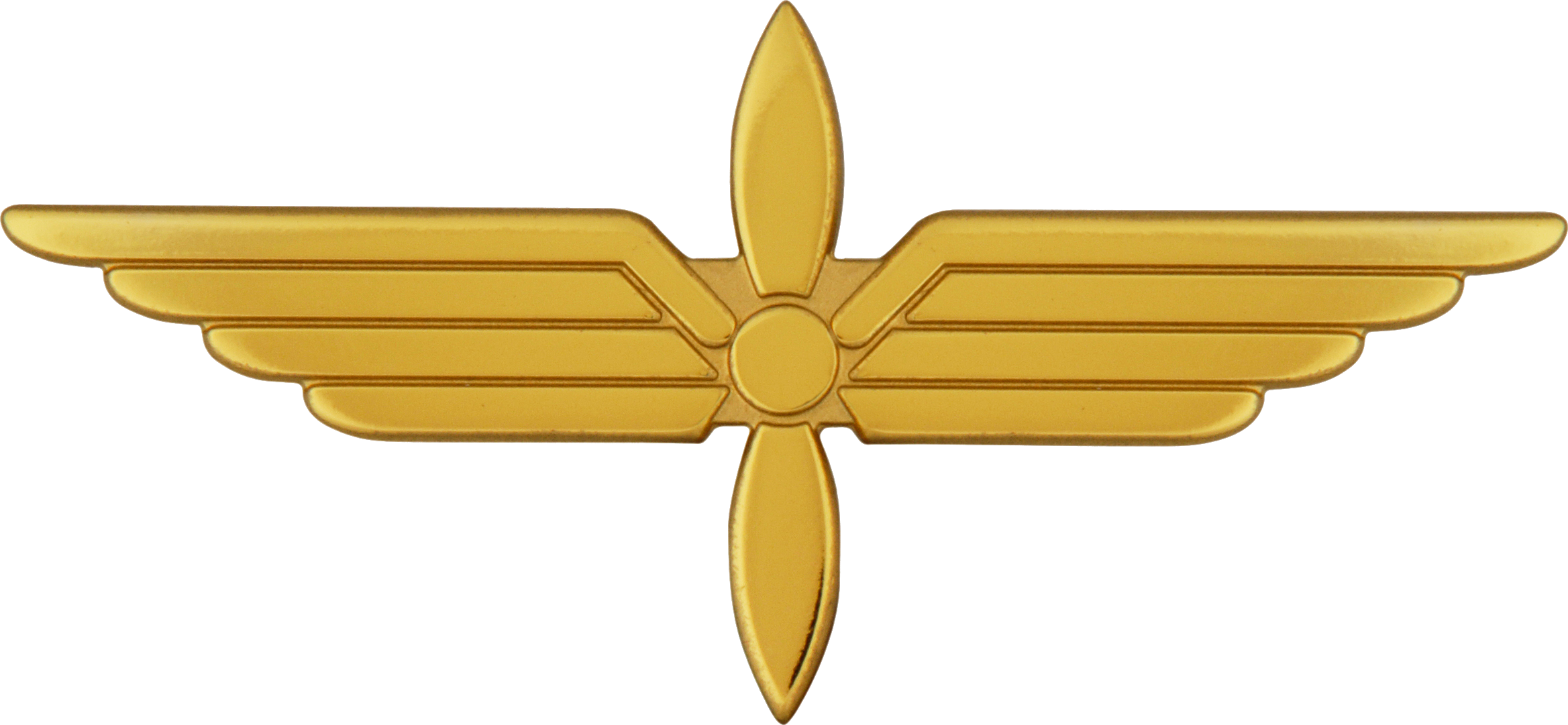

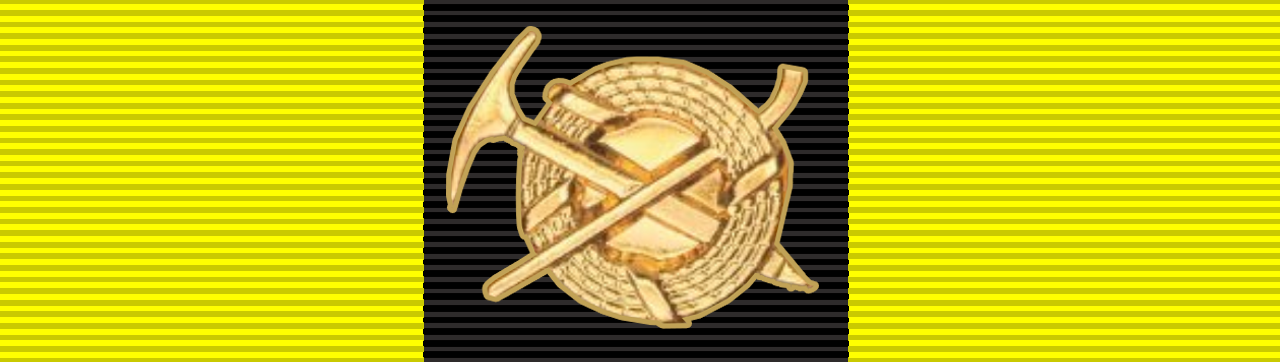

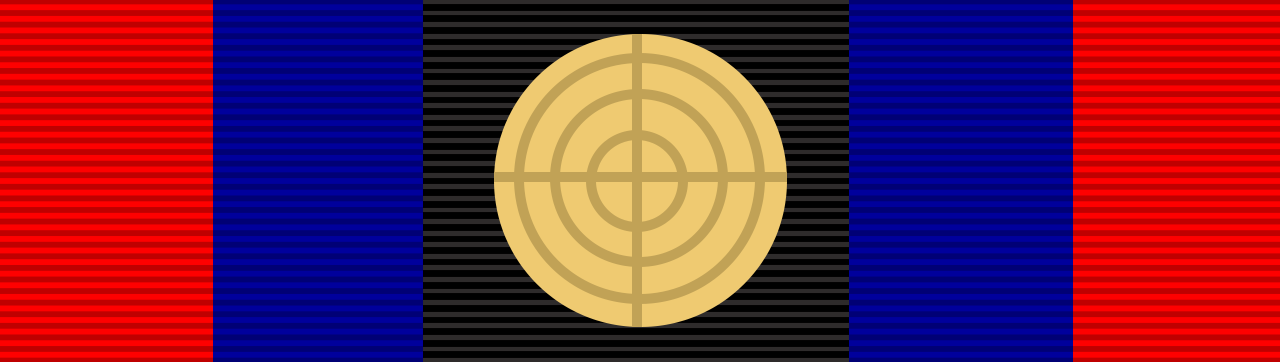

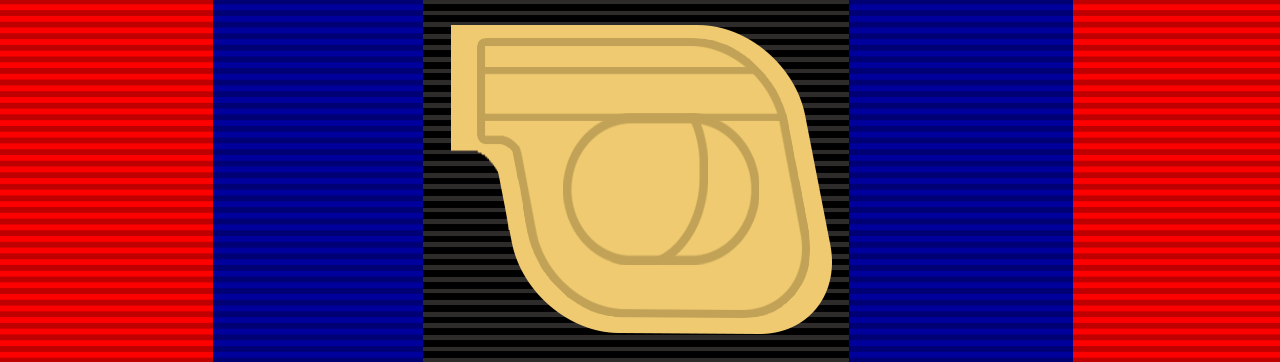

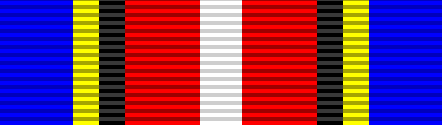

Pilot Insignia
| Length of Service Decoration with three golden rosettes | Alpine Decoration | Assault Rifle, Level 2 |
| Pistol, Level 2 | Military sport (Level 2) | Partnership for Peace Mission |

Military offices
| Preceded by Hans-Ulrich Scherrer | Chief of the General Staff; 1 January 2003 – 31 December 2003 | Structural reforms of the Armed Forces |
| New office | Chief of the Armed Forces; 1 January 2004 – 31 December 2007 | Succeeded by Lt Gen Roland Nef |
