= Aldo C. Schellenberg =

Swiss professional military officer (born 1958)

Aldo Carlo Schellenberg
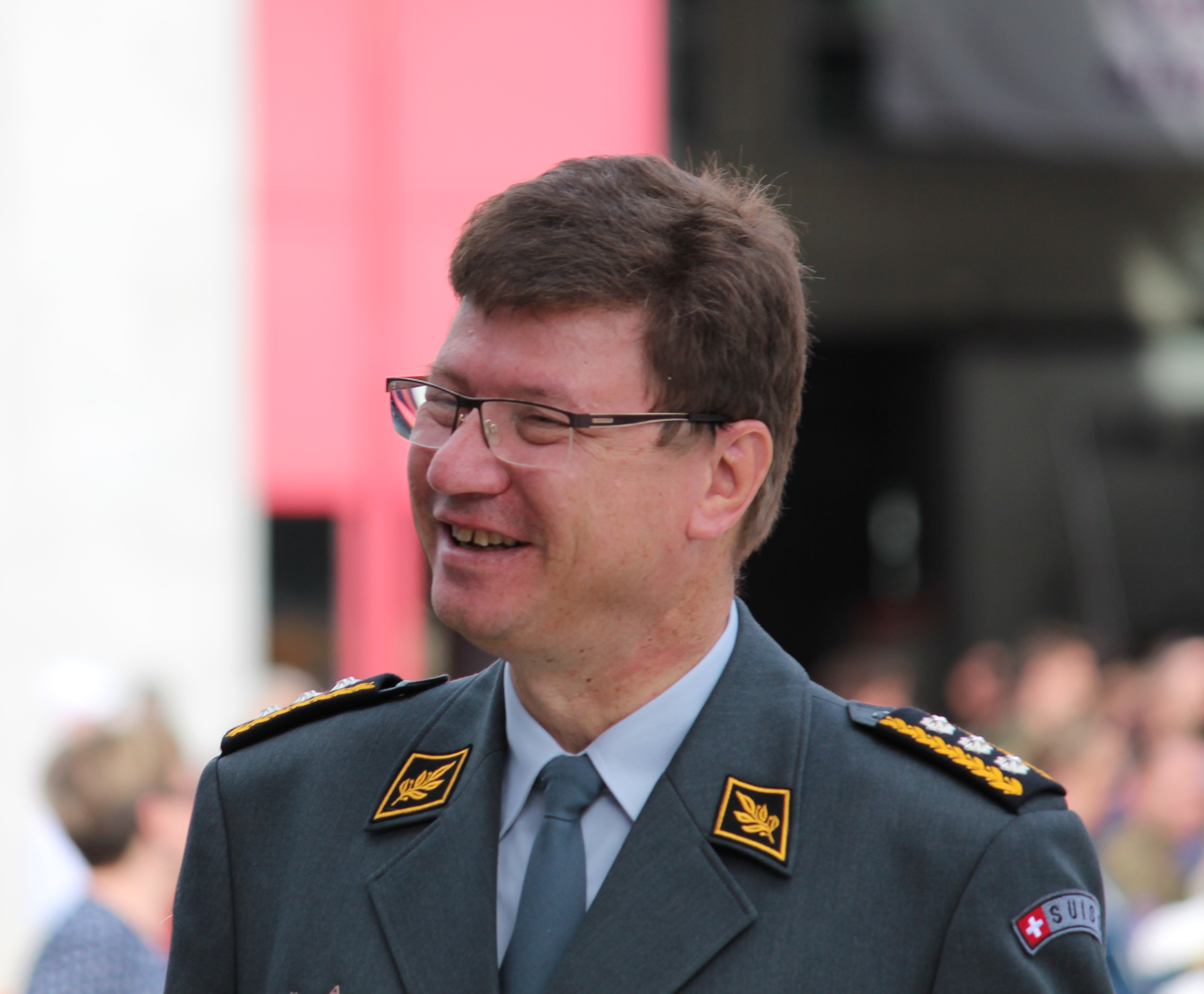
- KKdt Aldo C. Schellenberg (2017)
- Born: 9 September 1958 (age 68); Bülach, Switzerland
- Military career
- Allegiance: Switzerland
- Branch: Swiss Air Force
- Service years: 1990–present
- Rank: Lieutenant General; German: Korpskommandant NATO-Code: OF-8.
- Commands: Head of the Swiss Air Force
- Awards: See Decorations and awards

Lieutenant General Aldo C. Schellenberg (born September 9, 1958) is a Swiss professional military officer. He is the head of the Air Force and the designated deputy of the Swiss Chief of the Armed Forces.

== Personal life and education ==
Schellenberg attended school in Bülach and then completed his secondary education at Kantonsschule Zürcher Unterland after passing Matura type C exams in 1979. He went on to study economics at the University of Zurich, graduating in 1986. From 1986 to 1991, he worked as an assistant at the Institute for Business Research at the University of Zurich. In 1991, he studied for his doctorate under the supervision of Edwin Rühli, receiving the academic title Dr. oec. publ. (Doctor of Economics) in 1991.

Aldo Schellenberg is married and has four children.

== Business career ==
From 1992 to 2011, he was the owner of a business consulting company, which is now run by his wife. Schellenberg's professional experience proved significant during the 2007 Swissair trial, in which executives were accused of and later cleared of charges related to accounting practices. In addition, from 2003 to 2011, Schellenberg was a lecturer at Bern University's Institute for Corporate Accounting and Controlling. From 2006 to 2009, he completed a postgraduate degree in commercial law at Bern University, resulting in a LL.M. degree.

== Military service ==
As of 1 July 2010, Schellenberg worked part-time (60%) as commander of the Swiss Army's Mountain Infantry Brigade 12. On January 1, 2012, he was promoted to divisionär (major general) as chief of staff of the army.

On 1 January 2013, he succeeded Markus Gygax as commander of the Swiss Air Force. At its meeting on 22 March 2017, the Swiss Federal Council promoted Schellenberg to Chief of Operations of the Swiss Army, effective 1 January 2018.

In spring 2016, the new Federal Councillor Guy Parmelin stopped the procurement of a new air defense system, because the project group, headed by Schellenberg, proposed a system which did not fulfil requirements.

== Military positions and ranks ==
As a militia officer, Aldo Schellenberg has held the following positions:

- 1990: Captain: Commander of a Fortified Airman's Staff Battery
- 1994: Captain: Chief of Staff of Mountain Division 12
- 1997: Major in the General Staff: Commander of the Light Air Defense Division 12
- 2000: Oberstleutnant in the Generalstab: Deputy Chief of Staff of the Gebirgsdivision 12
- 2001: Oberst (colonel) of the General Staff: Staff of the Mountain Division 12
- 2004: Colonel in the General Staff: Stabschef of the Gebirgsinfanteriebrigade 12
- 2008: Colonel in the General Staff: Assigned staff officer in the staff of the Mountain Infantry Brigade 12
- 2010: Brigadier: Commander of the Mountain Infantry Brigade 12
- 2012: Divisional general: Chief of the Armestab
- 2013: Lieutenant General: Commander of the Swiss Air Force

== Decorations and awards ==

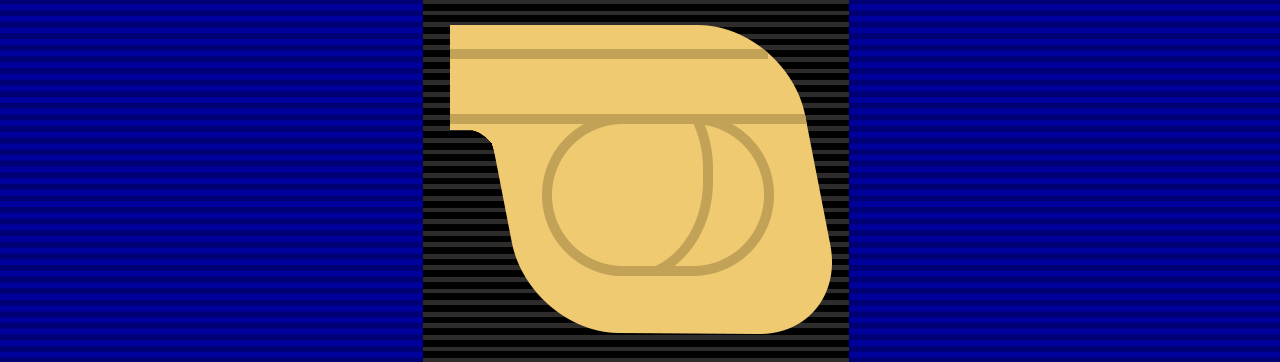

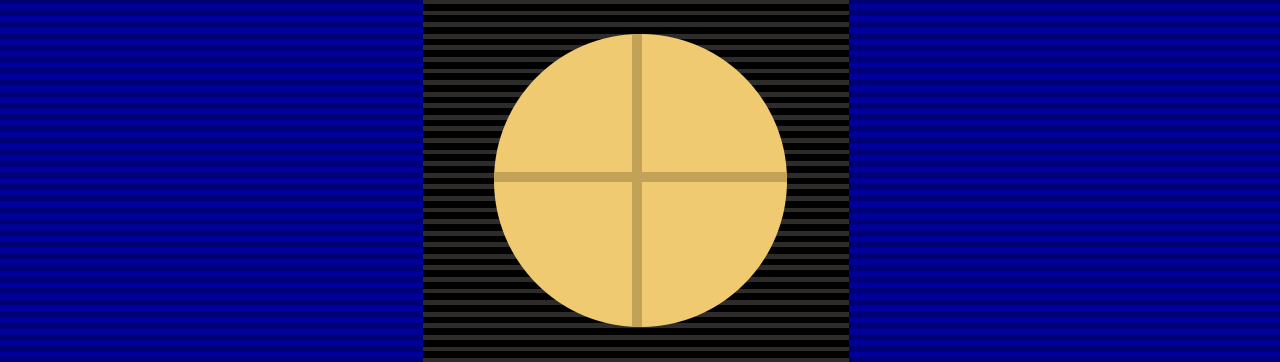

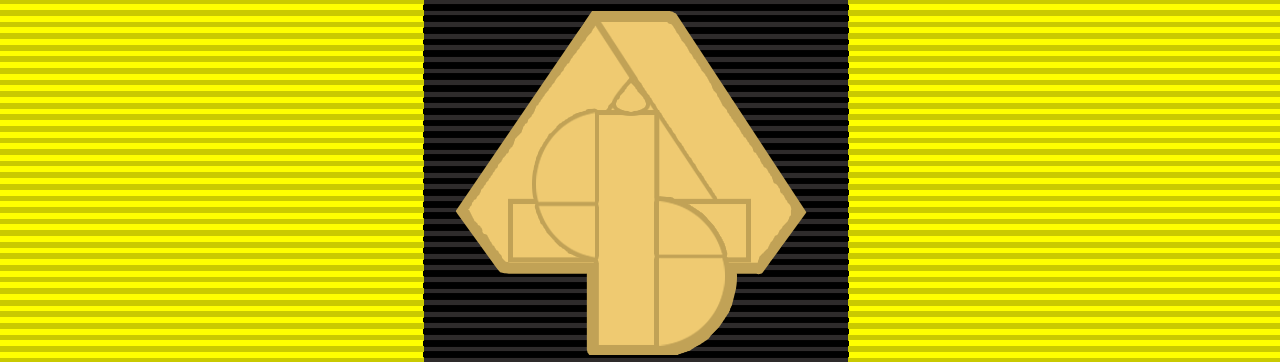

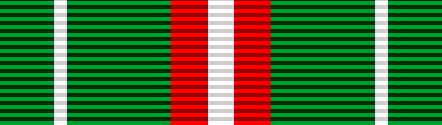

Length of Service Decoration with three golden rosettes	Pistol (Level 1)	Assault Rifle (Level 1)
Buddy Aid/NBC Defence	Military sport (Level 1)	Operations within Switzerland
