= Claude Meier =

Swiss professional officer of the Swiss Armed Forces

- Born: 18 May 1964 (age 62); Bülach, Switzerland
- Military career
- Allegiance: Switzerland
- Branch: Swiss Air Force
- Service years: 1985–present
- Rank: Divisional general Major General, NATO-Code: OF-7.
- Commands: Chief Army Staff

Divisional general Claude Meier is a Swiss professional officer (Divisional general) of the Swiss Armed Forces.

== Current tasks ==
As Head of the Army Division of the Swiss Army, Divisional general Meier is responsible for the most important business concerns in the Defense Department, and is directly responsible to the Chief of the Armed Forces. He is responsible for the operational implementation of the political and military strategic guidelines and instructions for action. He is responsible for the development, planning, resource allocation and control of the army at the close of the political-strategic and operational-tactical level. He is a member of the army leadership.

== Milestones ==
- 1985 Entry as a professional military pilot in the Überwachungsgeschwader ("Surveillance Squadron": the professional military pilot unit) of the Swiss Air Force. As a pilot and flight instructor he was active during the nineties, among other things, in the project introduction of the BAE Hawk jet training aircraft and was an air combat instructor on the F-5 Tiger
- 1992 Captain (OF-2), pilot in the Überwachungsgeschwader
- 1996 Group introduction F/A-18, retraining at the US Navy in Naval Air Station Cecil Field
- 1998 Leader of the PC-7 Team
- 2000-2002 Major (OF-3) in the General Staff, commander of the Fliegerstaffel 17 (squadron 17)
- 2003 Long-term assignment at the Collège Interarmées de Défense in Paris (since 2011 «École Militaire»)
- 2004-2005 Lieutenant-Colonel (OF-4) in the General Staff, Commander of an Airborne Squadron and Chief Specialist Air Combat
- 2006-2009 Chief Executive / Staff Formation Luftwaffe (A7)
- 2009 Head of Doctrine Research and Development
- 2010 Colonel (OF-5) on the General Staff, Chief Air Defense
- 2012 Chief A3 / 5, Unterstabschef Operations and Planning
- 2013, he successfully completed the Master's degree of Advanced Studies in Security Policy and Crisis Management at ETH Zurich
- 2016 Divisional general, Chief Army Staff, Chairman of the expert group for the procurement of new combat aircraft

== Decorations and awards ==
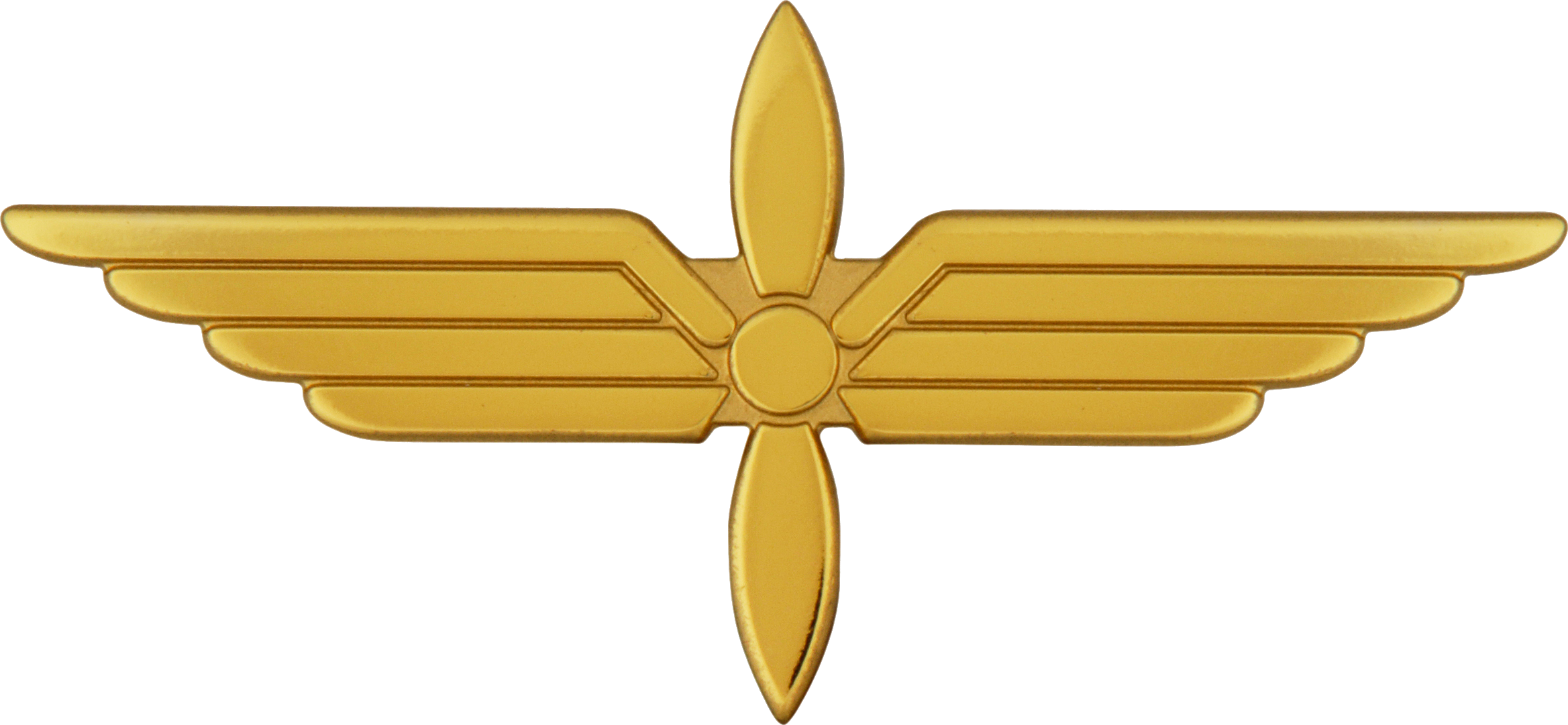

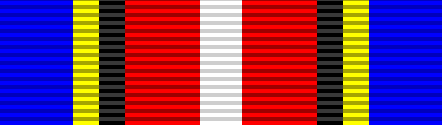

Pilot Abzeichen
Length of Service Decoration with three golden rosettes	Military sport (Level 1)	Partnership for Peace Mission

== Personal life ==
Claude Meier is married to Anne Meier-Duttweiler. He lives in Carrouge.
