= General Meyer =

General Meyer may refer to:

- Adolph Meyer (1842–1908), Louisiana National Guard brigadier general
- David J. Meyer (fl. 1980s–2020s), U.S. Air Force major general
- Edward C. Meyer (1928–2021), U.S. Army general
- John C. Meyer (1919–1975), U.S. Air Force general
- Kurt Meyer (1910–1961), German Waffen-SS brigadier general
- Len Meyer (fl. 1980s–1990s), South African Army lieutenant general
- Lucas Johannes Meyer (1846–1902), South African Boer general
- Monk Meyer (1913–2001), U.S. Army brigadier general

== See also ==
- Heinrich Meyer-Buerdorf (1888–1971), German Wehrmacht general
- Hermann Meyer-Rabingen (1887–1961), German Wehrmacht lieutenant general
- Claude Meier (born 1964), Swiss Air Force major general
- Edelmiro Mayer (1834–1897), Argentine-born Mexican Army general
- Johannes Mayer (1893–1963), German Wehrmacht general
