= Roland Nef =

Chief of the Swiss Armed Forces in 2008

Lieutenant-General (Korpskommandant) Roland Nef (born 1 July 1959) was the Chief of the Armed Forces (Chef der Armee) of Switzerland in 2008.

Nef, a jurist by profession, succeeded Lt-Gen. Christophe Keckeis in the position of Chief of the Armed Forces in January 2008. In July 2008, Nef resigned his post following media reports that his former partner had accused him of sexual harassment in a criminal complaint. The Swiss Federal Council accepted Nef's resignation on August 20, 2008.

During his military career, Nef held the following ranks and appointments:

- 1988: Lieutenant / Captain; commander of an armoured howitzer battery
- 1992: Captain in the General Staff; Intelligence Chief, Field Division 7
- 1995: Major in the General Staff; Commander, Armoured Howitzer Battalion 33
- 1999: Lieutenant-Colonel in the General Staff; Deputy Chief of staff / Operations, Field Division 7
- 2001: Colonel in the General Staff; Chief of Staff, Field Division 7
- 2002: Brigadier; Commander, Armoured Brigade 4
- 2004: Commander, Armoured Brigade 11
- 2007: Commander, Armour/Artillery Training Unit
- 2008: Lieutenant-General, Chief of the Armed Forces

Military offices
Preceded by Lt Gen Christophe Keckeis	Chief of the Armed Forces; 1 January 2008 – 28 February 2009^{1}	Succeeded by Lt Gen André Blattmann
Notes and references
1. formally; but relieved of his duties since 21 July 2008
