= Thomas Süssli =

Swiss Lieutenant General (born 1966)

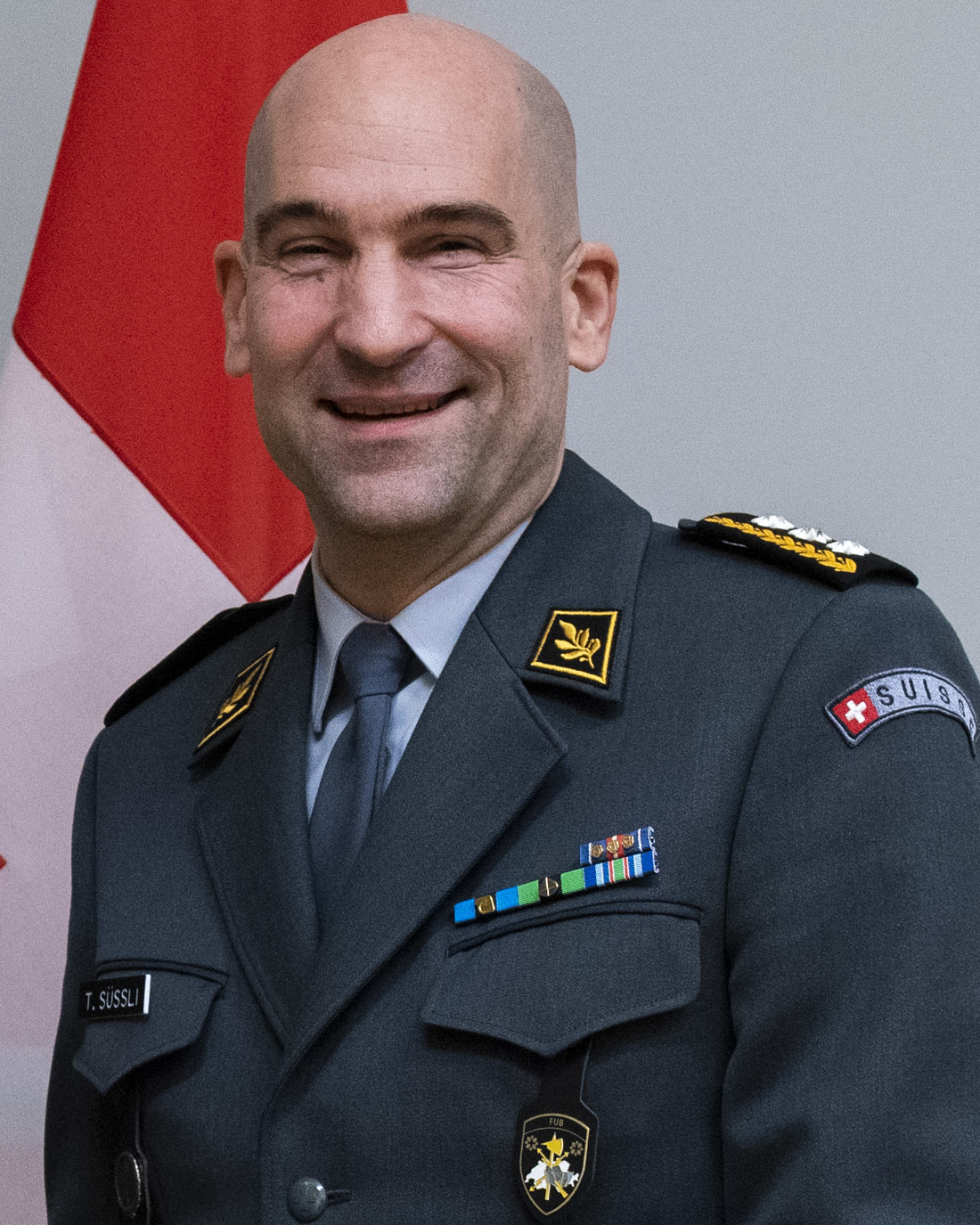
- Born: 24 September 1966 (age 59); Zürich, Switzerland
- Allegiance: Switzerland
- Branch: Swiss Armed Forces
- Service years: 1995–2025
- Rank: Korpskommandant
- Commands: Chief of the Armed Forces of Switzerland

Thomas Süssli (born 24 September 1966) is a Swiss Lieutenant General. Since 1 January 2020, he has served as the Chief of the Armed Forces. He succeeded Philippe Rebord.

== Biography ==
Süssli worked in the private sector in the banking and IT realms before becoming a full-time officer in 2015. In 2019, he was chosen to succeed Philippe Rebord as Chief of the Armed Forces, with his selection being viewed by observers as unusual considering his background. Rebord's formal retirement ceremony was held on 5 December 2019, and Süssli formally became the Armed Forces chief on 1 January 2020.

== Tenure ==
In late 2025 it was reported that Süssli opposed the planned introduction of Microsoft Office 365 across the military, calling it both too risky for holding confidential data and too expensive. In a letter to the Federal Chancellery, he demanded an immediate halt to the project and the creation of a separate, secure IT infrastructure for the Swiss army. This was revealed due to a Swiss freedom of information act request asking for some of his correspondence in relation to the matter.

== Decorations and awards ==
Süssli has been awarded the following decorations:

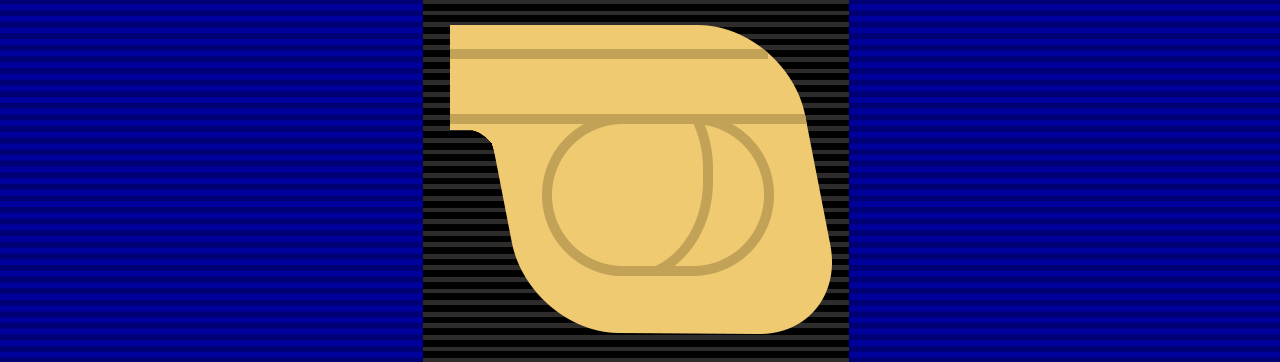

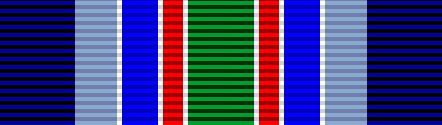

		Length of Service Decoration with three golden rosettes
Pistol (Level 1)	Military sport (Level 1)	Namibia Mission Insignia

Military offices
Preceded by Lt Gen Philippe Rebord	Chief of the Armed Forces; 1 January 2020 – 31 December 2025	Succeeded by Lt Gen Benedikt Roos
