= Al Fursan =

Aerobatics team

Fursan Al Emarat
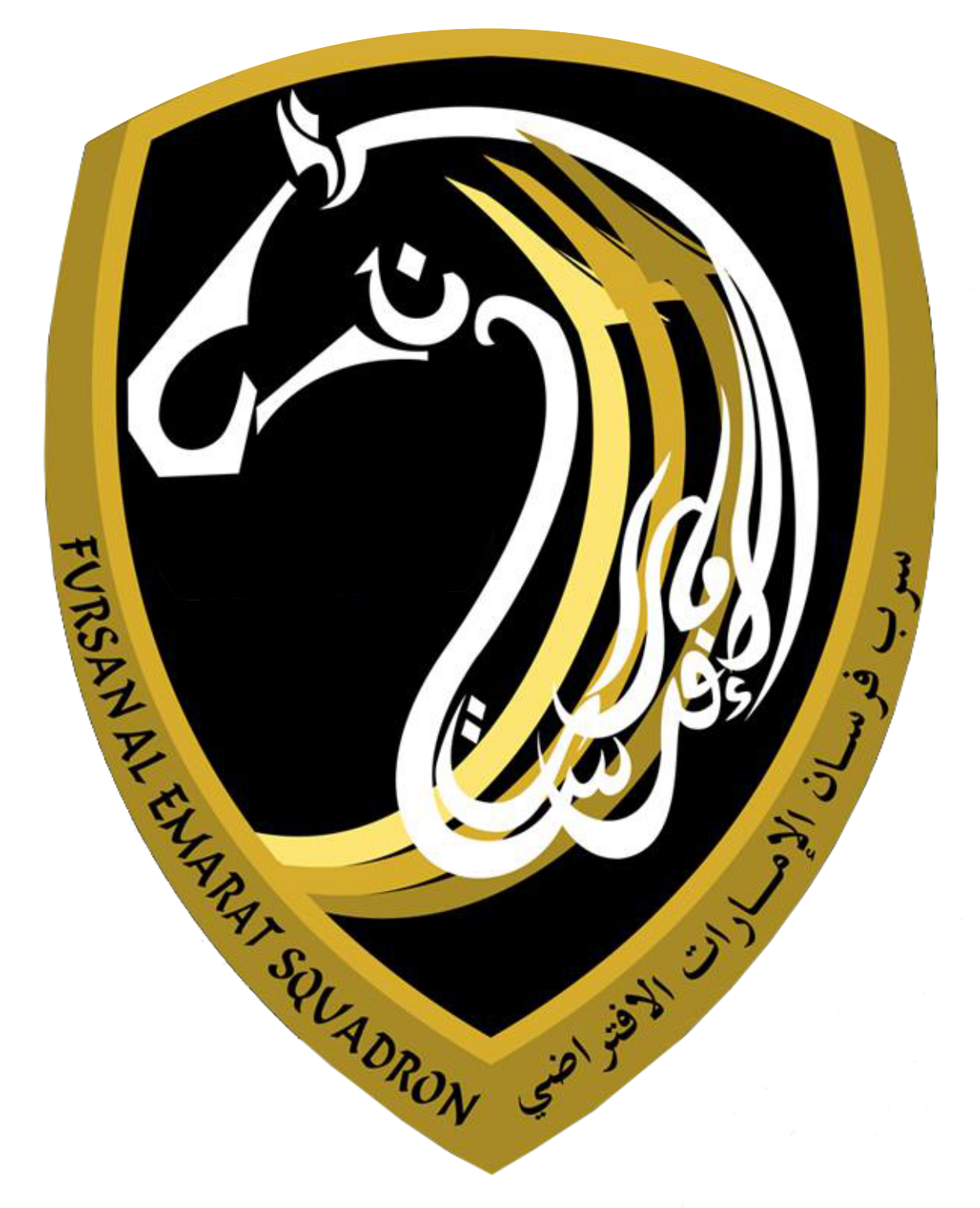
- Fursan Al Emarat insignia
- Active: 2010 – present
- Country: United Arab Emirates
- Branch: United Arab Emirates Air Force
- Role: Aerobatic display team
- Size: Seven aircraft
- Colors: Black and gold

Aircraft flown
- Trainer: Aermacchi MB-339NAT (2010 – 2025); Hongdu L-15 (2025 – present)

Al Fursan (Arabic: الفرسان; lit. 'The Knights'), officially Fursan Al Emarat (Arabic: فرسان الامارات; lit. 'The Knights of the Emirates'), is the Aerobatic demonstration team of the United Arab Emirates Air Force (UAEAF). It was formed in 2008 and initially flew with Aermacchi MB-339NAT aircraft. The team has a total of seven aircraft that symbolizes the seven Emirates of the United Arab Emirates. Since 2025, the team flies with Hongdu L-15 aircraft.

The team started their first show at Dubai Airshow and flew at the IDEX, Abu Dhabi Formula 1 Grand Prix, and for 2 December National day celebrations. Internationally the team has performed at LIMA exhibition and at the Royal International Air Tattoo.

== History ==
The team performed at the 2022 Bahrain International Airshow at Sakhir Air Base with five aircraft.

At the 2025 Dubai Airshow the team debuted their brand new Hongdu L-15, marking their first aircraft change since 2010.

In 2026, the team performed at the Farnborough Air Show 2026 with 7 Hongdu L-15 planes, symbolising the 7 Emirates of the UAE.

== Gallery ==
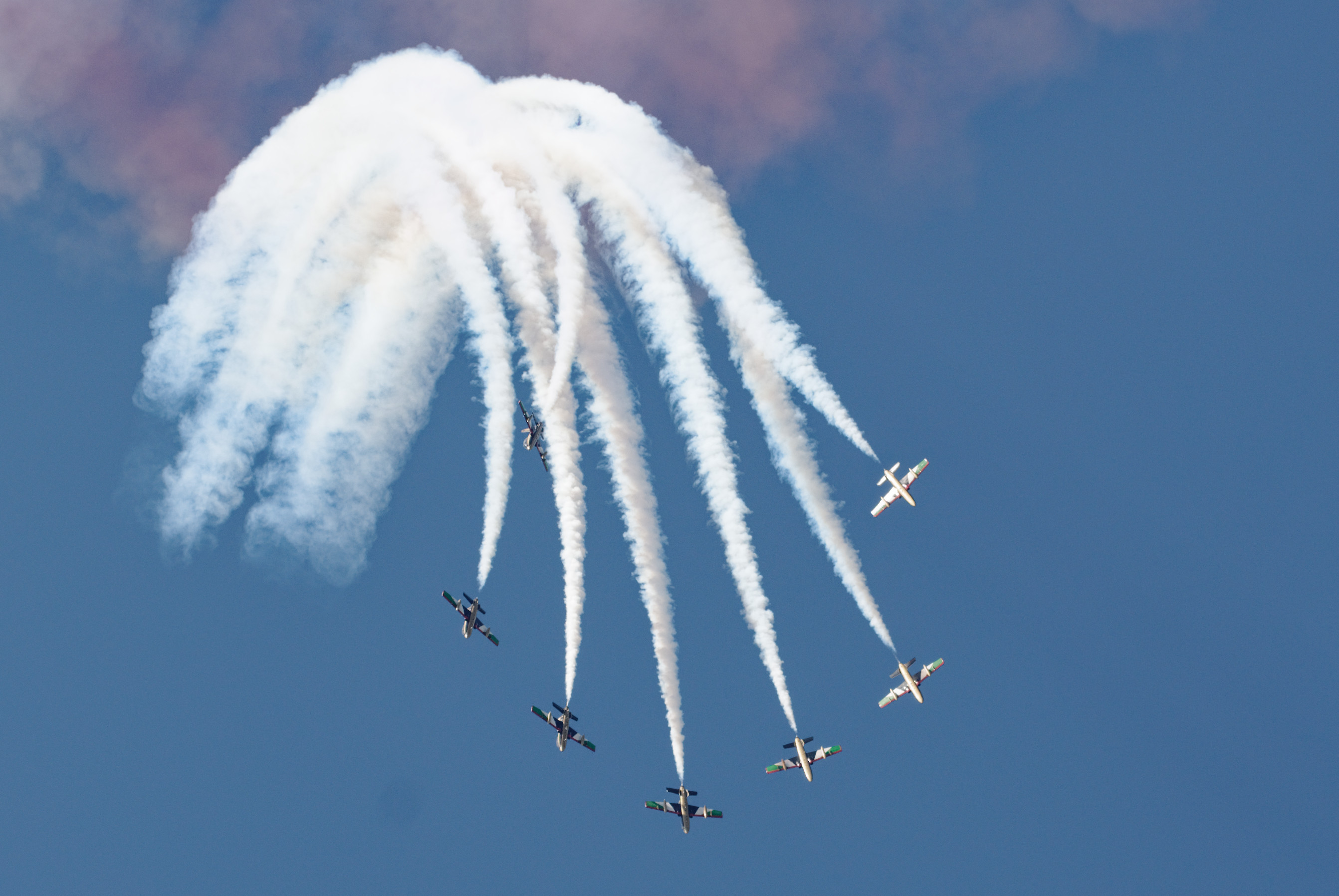
Al Fursan in Air14 air show in Payerne Air Base, 2014

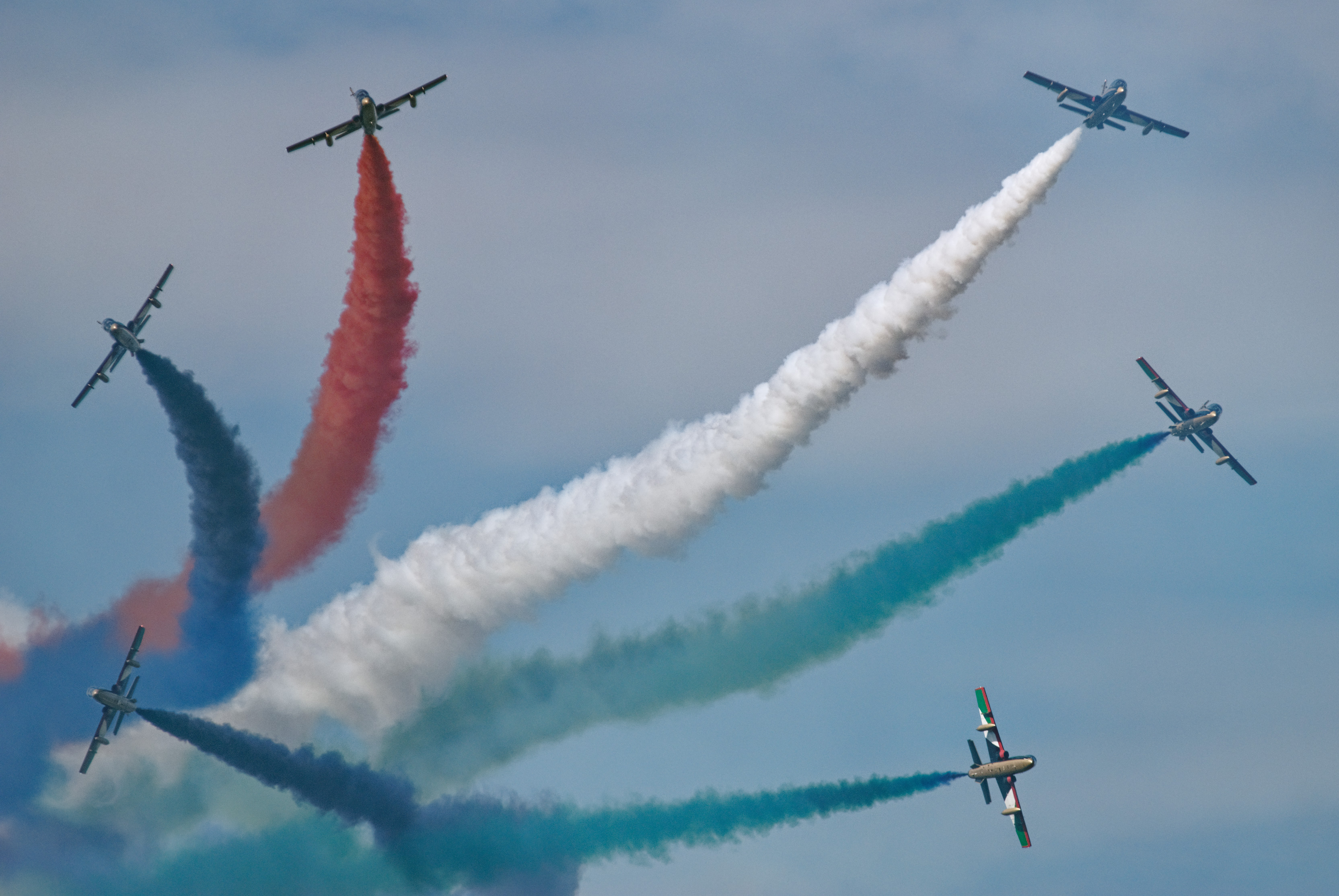
Al Fursan in Air14 air show in Payerne Air Base, 2014
