= Solo Display Team =

- Royal Netherlands Air Force badge
- Active: 1979–2019
- Country: Netherlands
- Branch: Royal Netherlands Air Force
- Role: Aerobatic flight display team

Aircraft flown
- Fighter: F-16
- Attack helicopter: AH-64D Apache
- Trainer: Pilatus PC-7

The Solo Display Team (Dutch: Demoteam) was the aerobatics display team of the Royal Netherlands Air Force (RNLAF) and consisted of three elements. The disbanded F-16 Solo Display Team used the fighter jet F-16 and the AH-64D Apache Solo Display Team uses the helicopter AH-64 Apache. The PC-7 Solo Display Team flew the low-wing tandem-seat training aircraft Pilatus PC-7.

== F-16 Solo Display Team ==
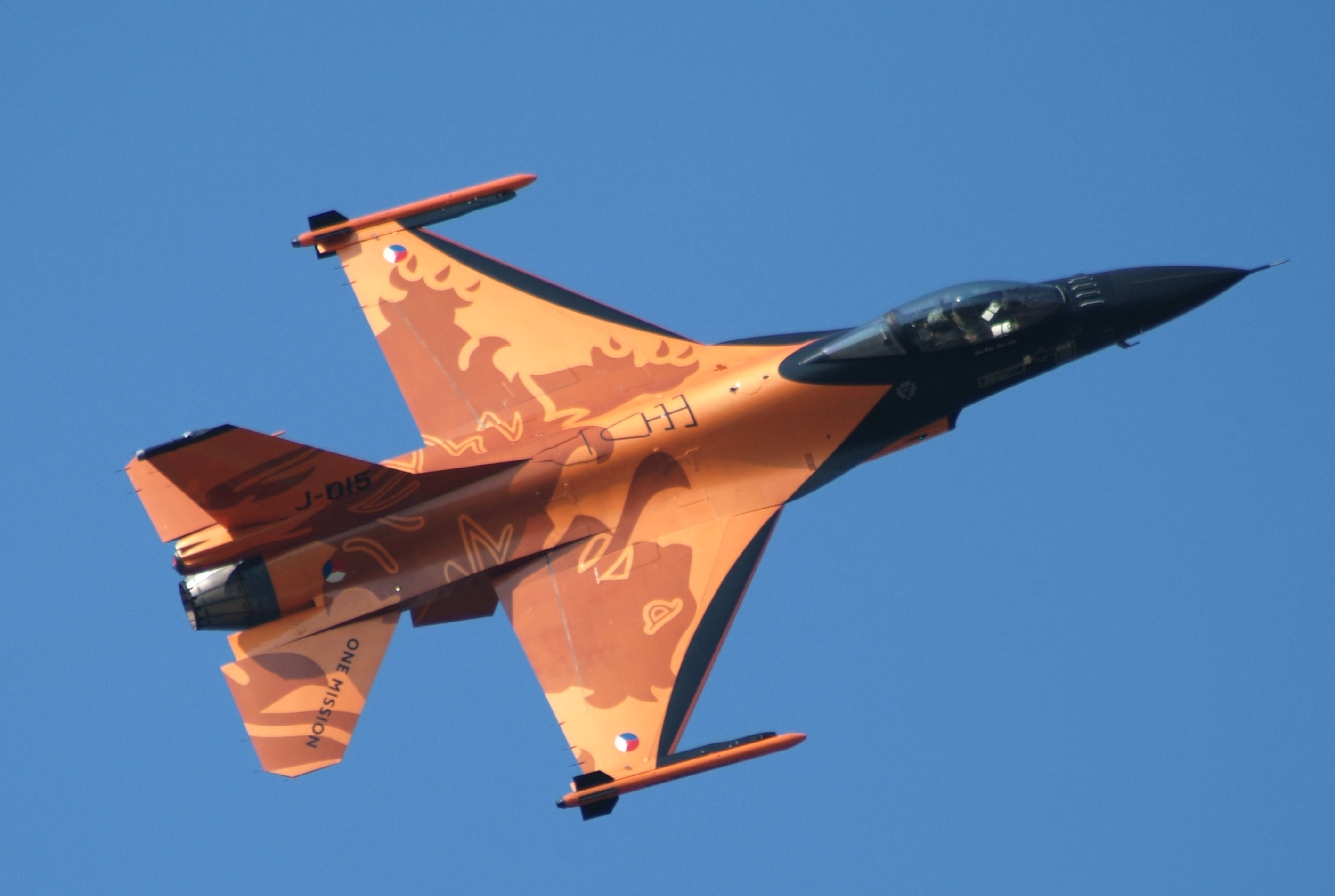
The F-16 of the Solo Display Team in 2009

The F-16 Solo Display Team was last based at Leeuwarden Air Base in the Dutch province of Friesland and consisted of the pilot, two instructors and seven ground crew. The members of the team were always seconded from a squadron of the Royal Netherlands Air Force. The last pilot, Kapitein (Flight Lieutenant) Jeroen "Slick" Dickens, flies with 323 Squadron. All members were operational military personnel and, apart from their tasks with the demo team, performed normal operational duties.

The Dutch F16 demo team moved to another squadron and/or base every two years, season 2007-2009 having been the exception. From 2005 until 2009 the demo team was based at Volkel Air Base. In 2010 the team consisted of members of operational squadrons from Leeuwarden Air Base. They took over the orange F-16, J-015. In 2012 and 2013 the team was based at Volkel Air Base and returned to Leeuwarden Air Base in early 2014.

The team was established in September 1979 with the first demonstration of an RNLAF F-16 during an air show at Twente Air Base (now Enschede Airport Twente). The team took part at air shows in European countries and, in 2006, at Edwards Air Force Base in the United States. The team won the prize for the best display team in the jet category at the air show held at Reims – Champagne Air Base in 2009.

The team had no single colour scheme. The orange colour scheme used at the time of its disbanding was unveiled in April 2009. On 17 December 2018 it was announced that F-16 Solo Display Team had been permanently disbanded. The team had already been inactive since 2015 due to a shortage of personnel and material.

== AH-64D Apache Solo Display Team ==
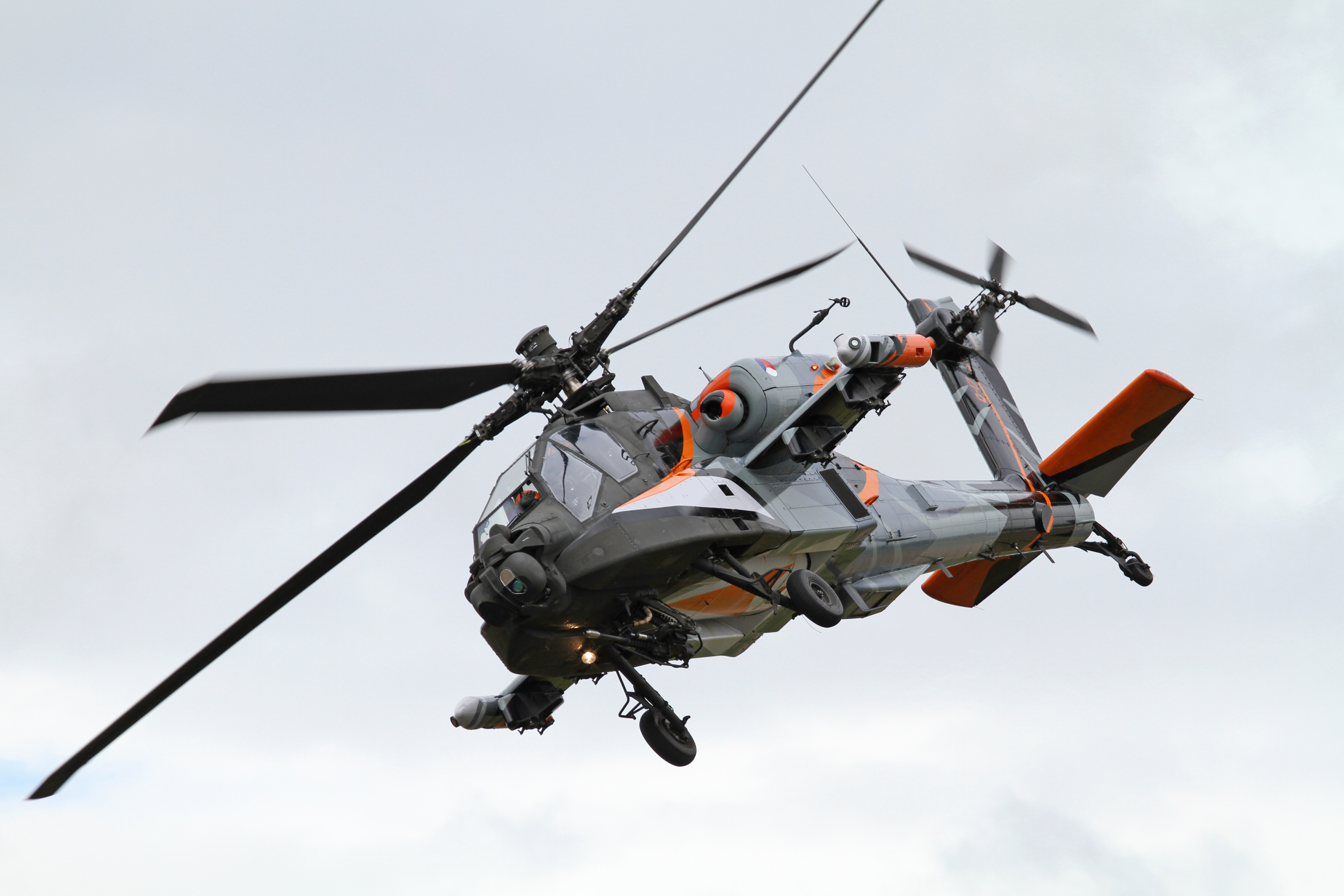
The AH-64D Apache on display

The Apache Solo Display Team was based at Gilze-Rijen Air Base in the Dutch province of North Brabant and used the four-blade, twin-engine Boeing AH-64D Apache attack helicopter . The team was formed in 2002 as a one-off to take part in the air show that was held that year at its airbase. However, the team kept performing at airshows in the following years and, in July 2005, won the "Sir Douglas Bader Trophy" at the Royal International Air Tattoo which took place at RAF Fairford in Gloucestershire, United Kingdom, having performed the previous month at the air show held at their home base.

The Apache Solo Display Team was inactive between 2005 and 2009 due to operational deployments but began to carry out demo flights again in 2010, the first of which took place at RAF Fairford during the Royal International Tattoo in July.

The current pilots are Sqn Ldr Roland Wally Blankenspoor and Sqn Ldr Harm Kaas Cazemier, supported by a crew composed of member from 299 Squadron and 301 Squadron.

== PC-7 Solo Display Team ==
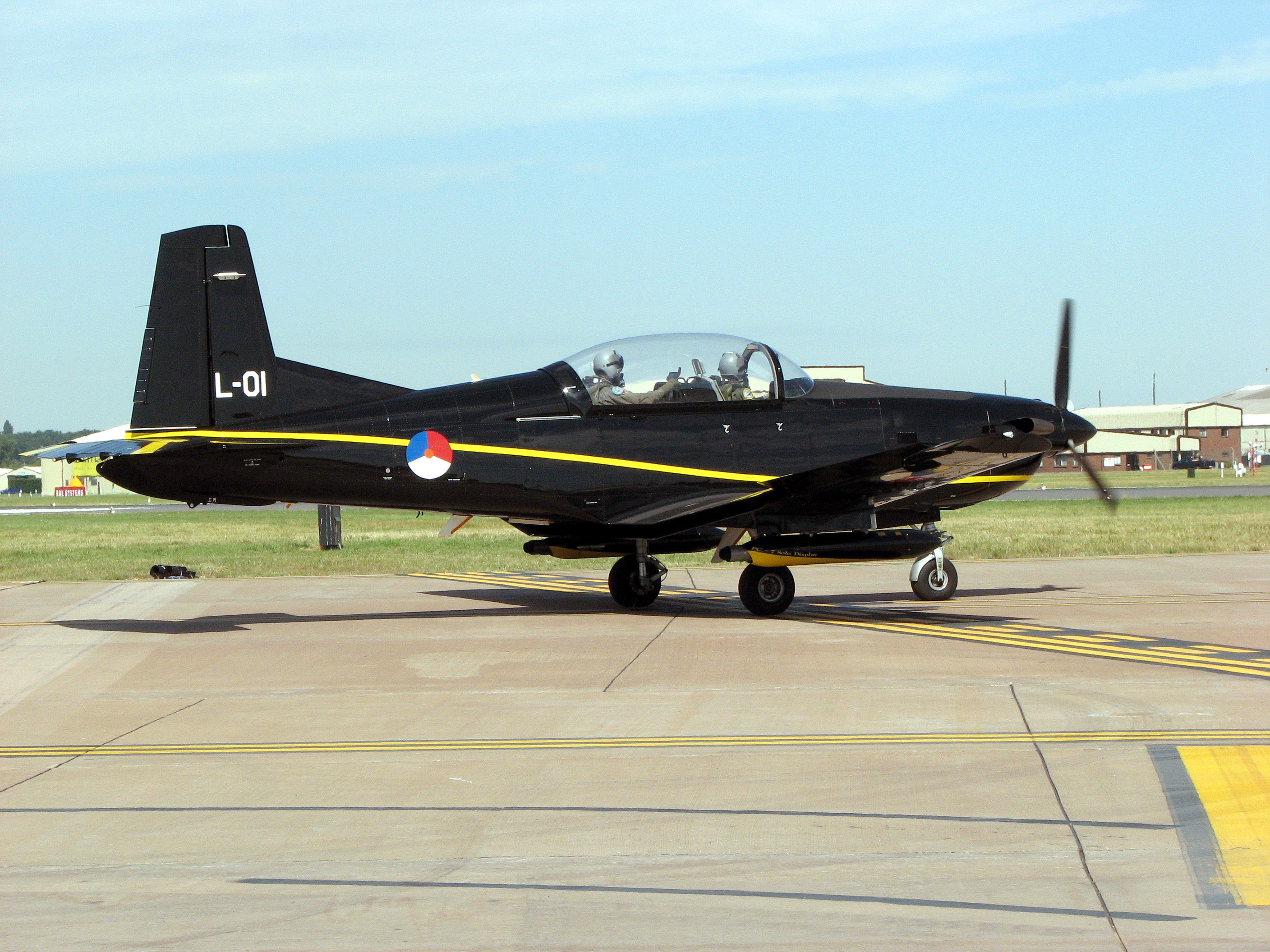
RNLAF Pilatus PC-7

The PC-7 Solo Display Team was based at Woensdrecht Air Base in the Dutch province of North Brabant. It flew one of the thirteen single engine turbo trainer Pilatus PC-7 of the Royal Netherlands Air Force. The team consisted of the pilot, two instructors and the ground crew. The PC-7 Solo Display Team had two aircraft at its disposal, unlike the F-16 Solo Display Team, one operational, the other functions as backup.

The team was established in 1995 and performs at air shows in Europe. The colour scheme used for the aircraft is predominantly black, with a single yellow line along the fuselage and the tail. The yellow line is repeated on the underside and the top of the wings.

Currently (2008–2013) there is no PC-7 solo display active. All PC-7s and instructors are needed for training at the Elementary Flight School EMVO (Elementaire Militaire Vlieger Opleiding).
