= Markus Gygax =

Swiss airforce commander

- Born: 30 April 1950 (age 76); Solothurn, Switzerland
- Military career
- Allegiance: Switzerland
- Branch: Swiss Air Force
- Service years: 1971–2012
- Rank: Lieutenant General
- Commands: Chief of Staff of the Swiss Air Force

Lieutenant General Markus Gygax is a former commander of the Swiss Air Force. His active career within the SAF began in 1971 when he achieved his qualification as a pilot. In 1973 he joined the surveillance wing flying the Hawker Hunter, and in 1978 underwent conversion to the F-5 at Williams AFB, Arizona. He was also pilot by the Swiss Air Force's jet display team Patrouille Suisse when they used the Hawker Hunter. Starting with 1985 until 1989 he was the head of the F-5 training school. In 1994 he was appointed interim commander of an aviation regiment and from 1998 through 2002 he commanded the 31st Aviation Brigade. By 2003 he became chief of air force operations and deputy commander of the air force.

He took office as overall commander of the Swiss Air Force on 1 March 2009 and gathered more than 4,600 flying hours. He retired in 2012, his successor was Aldo C. Schellenberg.

== Milestones ==
- 1978 - Williams Air Force Base, Arizona, F-5E/F Tiger Conversion Courses
- 1985—1989 - Chief flying instructor on F-5E/F Tiger in Pilot Officers' Schools
- 1990—1991 - Assigned staff officer to the Chief of Operations of the Swiss Air Force
- 1991—1992 - Staff College "Ecole Supérieure de Guerre Aérienne", Paris, France
- 1994 - Interim Commander of an air force regiment
- 1994—1997 - Chief of F/A-18 Hornet training conversion unit
- 1998—2002 - Commander of an Air Force Brigade
- 2003 - Chief of Operations and Deputy Commander-in-chief of the Swiss Air Force
- 2004—2008 - Chief Air Force Operations Staff and Deputy Commander of the Air Force
- 21.06.2008—31.12.2012 - Chief of staff of the Swiss Air Force

== Decorations and awards ==
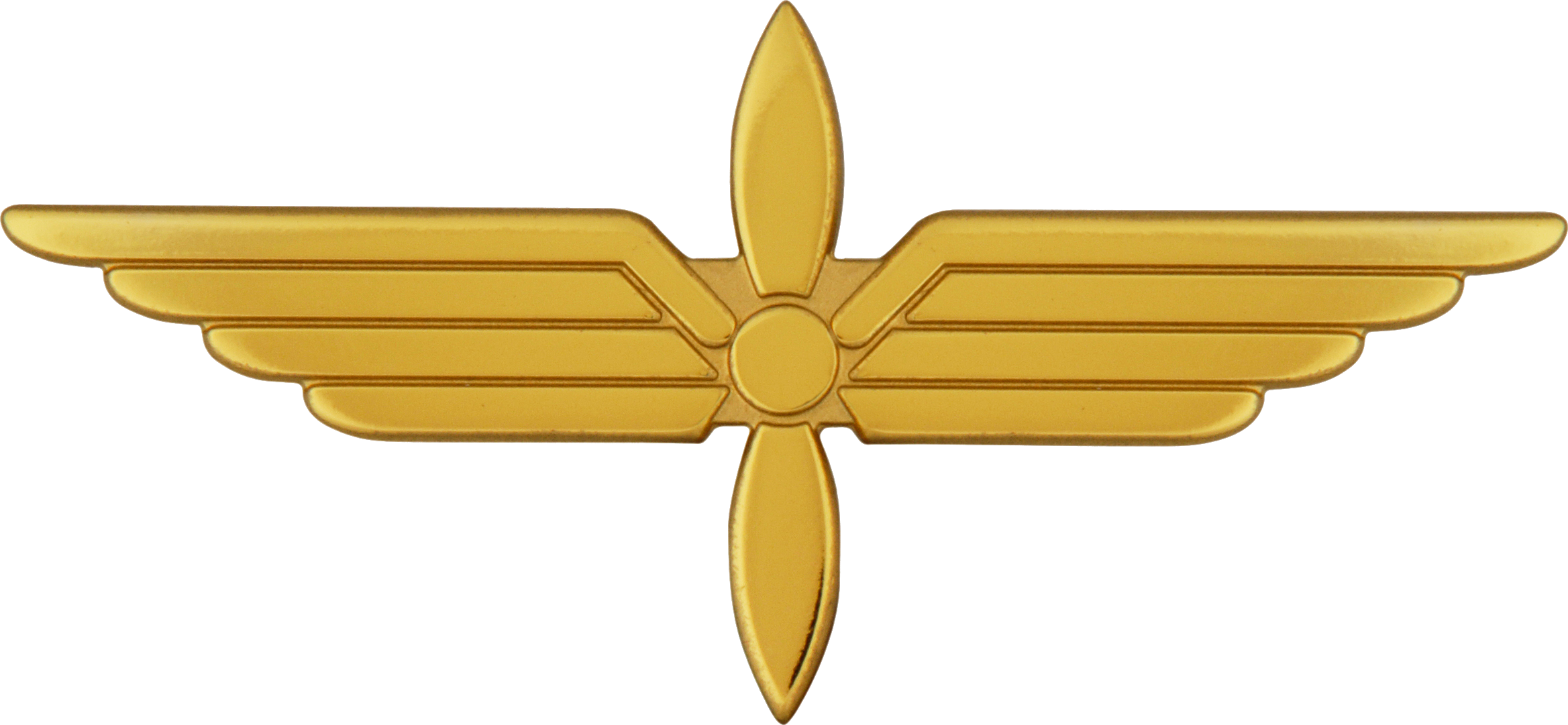

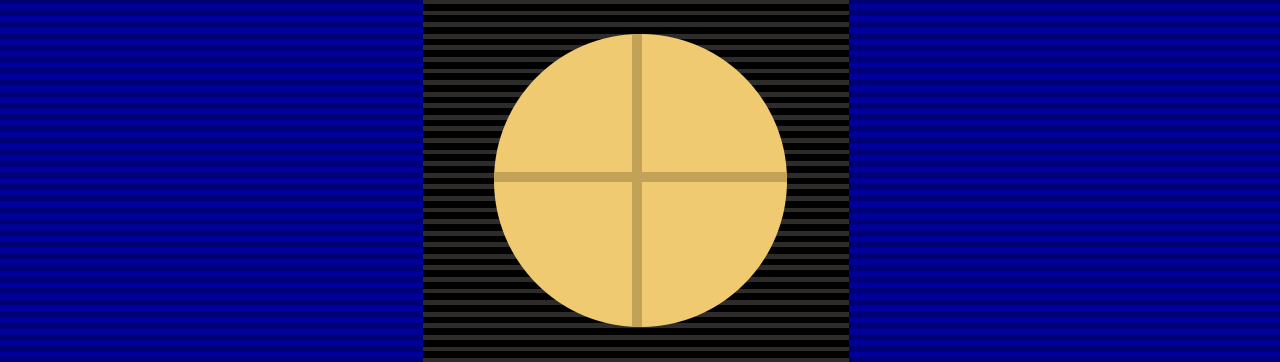

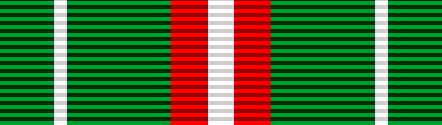

Pilot insignia
		Length of Service Decoration with three golden rosettes
Military Assault rifle level 1	Military sport (Level 2)	Operations within Switzerland
