= Philippe Rebord =

Swiss Lieutenant General (born 1957)

- Born: 22 April 1957 (age 69); Bovernier, Valais, Switzerland
- Allegiance: Switzerland
- Branch: Swiss Armed Forces
- Service years: 1985–2019
- Rank: Korpskommandant
- Commands: Chief of the Armed Forces of Switzerland

Philippe Rebord (born 22 April 1957) is a Swiss Lieutenant General. He served as the Chief of the Armed Forces beginning on 1 January 2017, succeeding André Blattmann. Rebord retired at the end of 2019 and was succeeded by Thomas Süssli.

== Early life and education ==
Rebord was born on 22 April 1957 in Bovernier, canton Valais. He earned a Lic. Phil.-hist. at the University of Lausanne.

== Career ==
Rebord began his career in the Swiss Armed Forces in 1985. He served in numerous positions, rising through the ranks of the Armed Forces.

On 16 September 2016, after Chief of the Armed Forces André Blattmann announced his coming retirement, the Swiss government appointed Rebord to replace him. Blattmann's formal retirement ceremony was held on 8 December 2016 and Rebord officially succeeded him on 1 January 2017. That same day, Rebord was promoted to the rank of Korpskommandant.

Soon after his appointment as Armed Forces Chief, Rebord made purchasing new fighter jets for the Swiss Air Force and ensuring that the Armed Forces continued having enough soldiers the priorities of the Armed Forces. He also called for an increased military budget, arguing the current levels were insufficient.

In early April 2019, Rebord announced that he will resign at the end of the year due to a serious thrombosis and a needed hip operation. In early September 2019, Thomas Süssli was announced as his successor. Rebord's formal retirement ceremony was held on 5 December 2019, and his retirement officially took effect at the end of the year.

Military offices
Preceded by Lt Gen André Blattmann	Chief of the Armed Forces; 1 January 2017 – 31 December 2019	Succeeded by Lt Gen Thomas Süssli
