= André Blattmann =

Swiss Army General

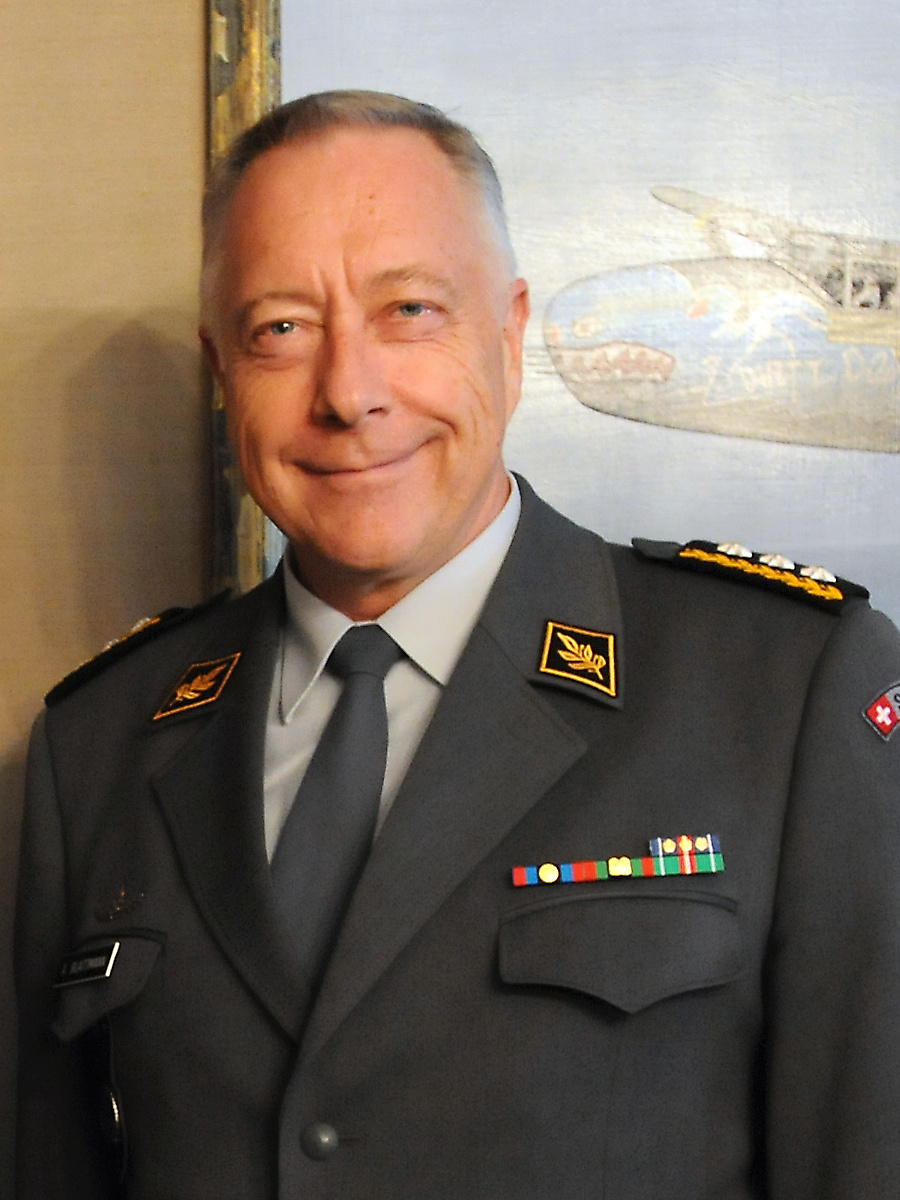
- Lt Gen André Blattmann during a visit to the Pentagon in July 2015
- Born: 6 March 1956 (age 70); Richterswil, Switzerland
- Allegiance: Switzerland
- Branch: Swiss Army
- Service years: 1984–2017
- Rank: Korpskommandant
- Commands: Chief of the Armed Forces
- Awards: See Decorations and awards

André Blattmann (born 6 March 1956) was the Swiss Lieutenant General and Chief of the Armed Forces from 1 March 2009 (ad interim since 20 August 2008) until 31 December 2016. He led the Swiss army after the leave of Roland Nef ad interim on 25 July 2008.

== Biography ==
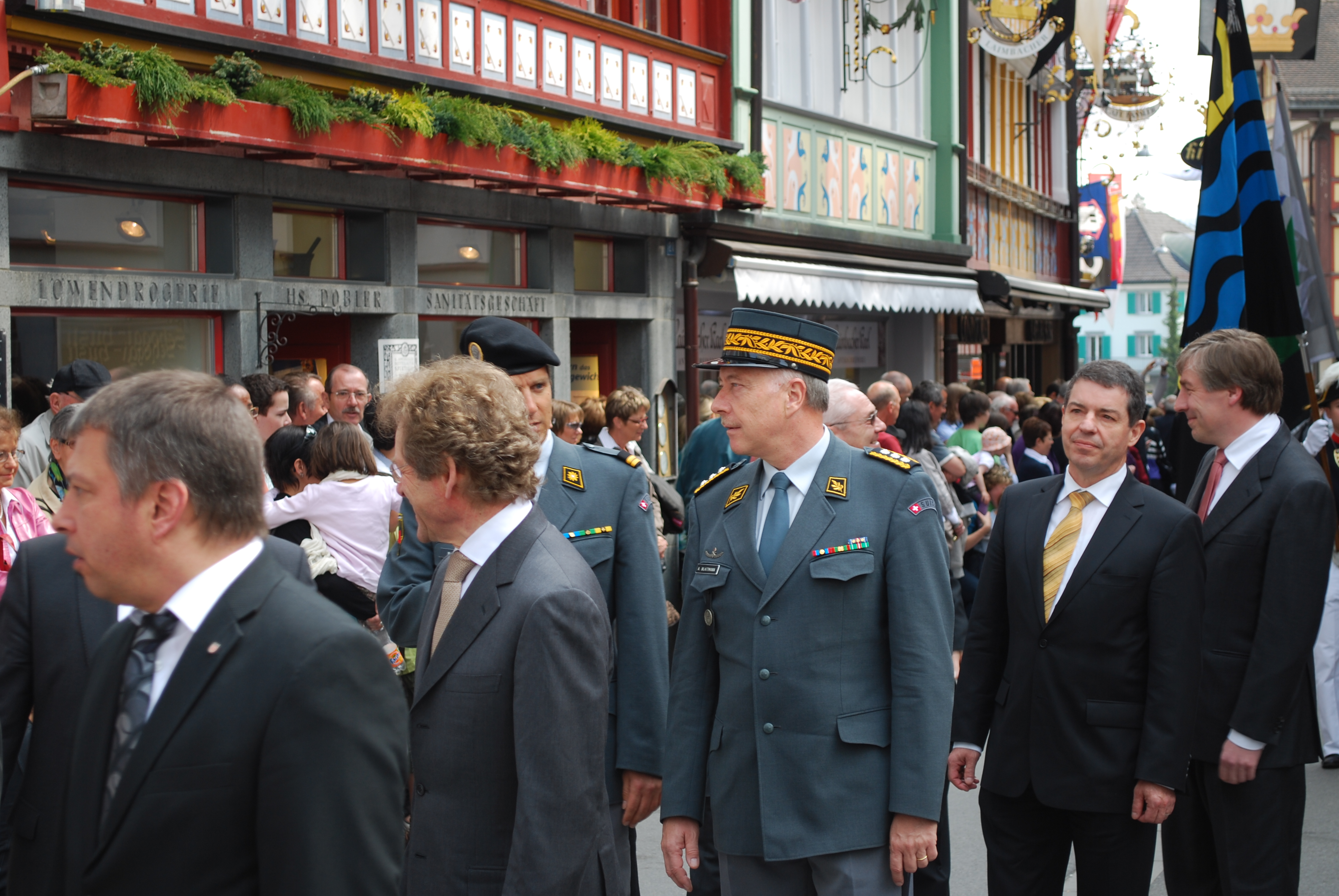
André Blattmann (center) as a guest of honor at the Landsgemeinde in Appenzell on 25 April 2010

Blattmann did an apprenticeship as a clerk and was promoted to Bachelor of Business Administration. In 2003 he completed an Executive MBA education at the University of Zurich.

On 1 January 2001 his appointment as Chief of Staff of the Field Army Corps 4 became effective with simultaneous promotion to Brigadier. In 2002 he attended the Senior International Defense Management Course in Monterey, California in the United States.

From 2004 to 2005 he was the commander of the Central School, which is part of the higher professional training of the army. From 1 January 2006 Blattmann served as Assigned Higher Staff Officer.

Blattmann replaced Roland Nef, who resigned on 25 July 2008 following allegations of sexual harassment, as Chief of the Armed Forces.

In December 2015, Blattman warned that cutbacks to the Swiss military are a serious threat because of the rise of terrorism and hybrid warfare.

In March 2016 the minister of defence announced the retirement of André Blattmann by the end of 2016. His formal retirement ceremony was held on 8 December 2016 and he was succeeded by Philippe Rebord on 1 January 2017. After his retirement, Blattmann continued to work for the Swiss Armed Forces as an advisor, expecting to retire on 31 December 2017.

On 16 November 2017 André Blattmann was appointed to the Board of Directors of Swiss International Air Lines, where he would take up his duties on 1 January 2018.

== Decorations and awards ==

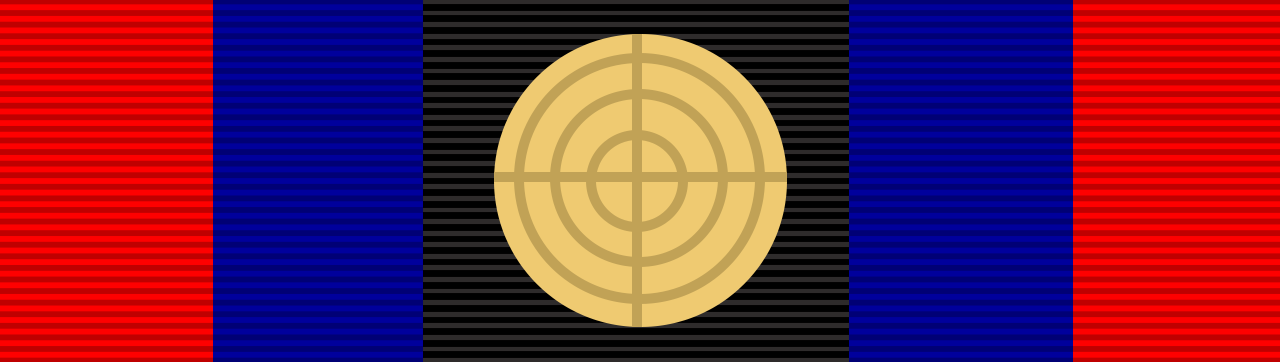

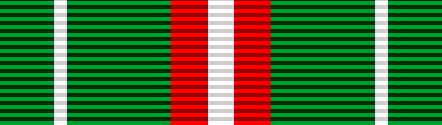

		Length of Service Decoration with three golden rosettes
Assault Rifle (Level 2)	Military sport (Level 2)	Operations within Switzerland

Military offices
Preceded by Lt Gen Roland Nef	Chief of the Armed Forces; 1 March 2009^{1} – 31 December 2016	Succeeded by Lt Gen Philippe Rebord
Notes and references
1. Chief of the Armed Forces ad interim since 20 August 2008
