= Riese =

Riese may refer to:

- Project Riese, a German Nazi World War II economic project
- Riese Pio X, a municipality in Italy
- Adam Ries (1492–1559), German mathematician
- Riese: Kingdom Falling (originally named Riese), an American science fiction-fantasy TV series filmed in Canada, which followed a web series
- Riešė, a village in Lithuania
- Didžioji Riešė, a village in Lithuania
