= Chief of the Armed Forces (Switzerland) =

Commander of the Swiss Armed Forces

Chief of the Swiss Armed Forces
- Chef der Armee (German); Chef de l'armée (French); Capo dell’esercito (Italian)
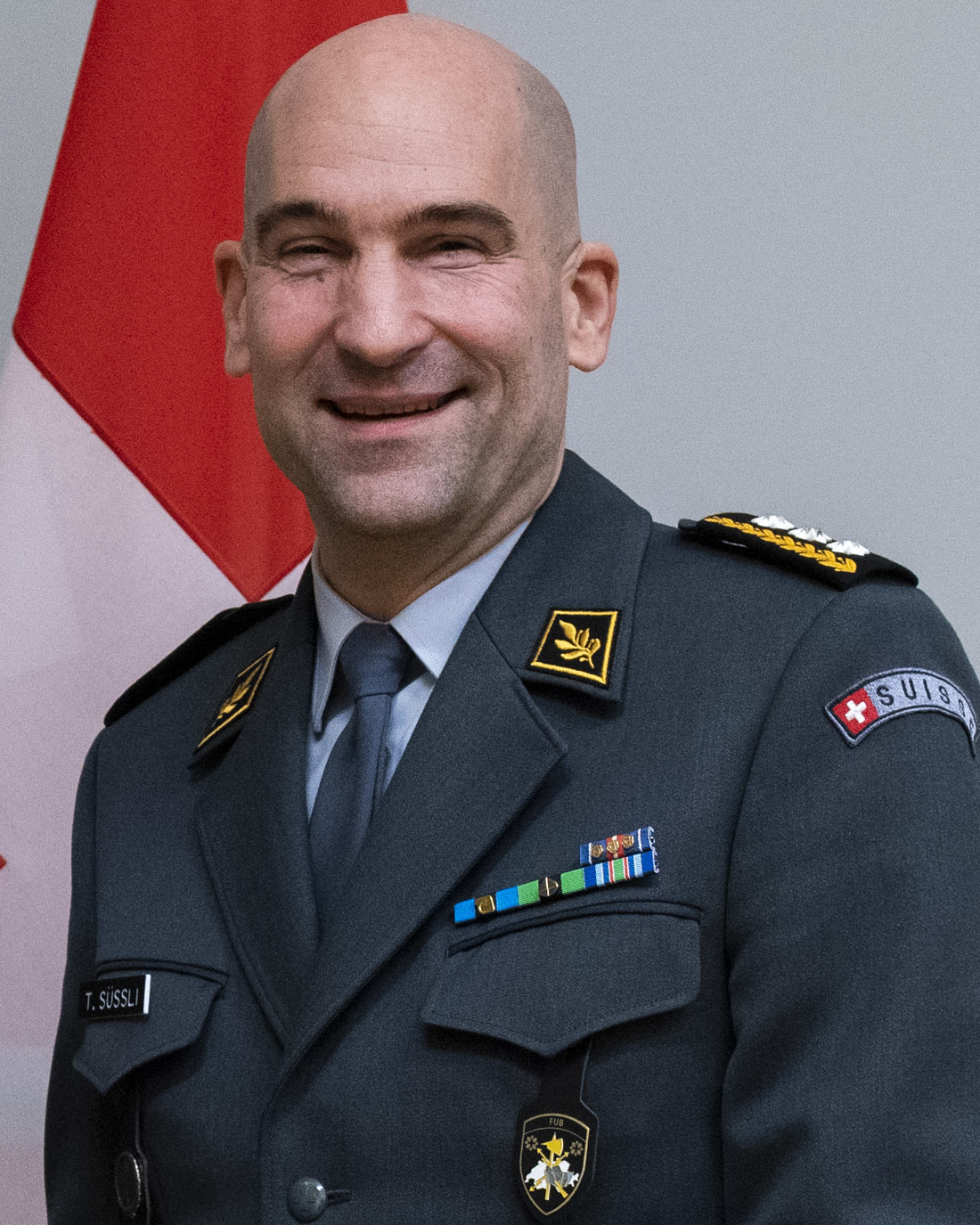
- Incumbent; Korpskommandant Thomas Süssli since 1 January 2020
- Federal Department of Defence
- Abbreviation: CdA
- Reports to: Head of the Department of Defence
- Appointer: Federal Council
- Precursor: Chief of the General Staff
- Formation: 1 January 2004; 22 years ago
- First holder: Christophe Keckeis
- Website: Official website

The Chief of the Armed Forces (German: Chef der Armee (CdA); French: Chef de l'armée; Italian: Capo dell’esercito) commands the Swiss Armed Forces in time of peace and reports directly to the head of the Federal Department of Defence, Civil Protection and Sports and to the Swiss Federal Council. The position was established in 2004.

== History ==
Until the end of 2003, the highest level of command in the Swiss Armed forces was held by the General Staff, led by the Chief of the General Staff as primus inter pares. Together with other reforms of the Armed Forces (German: Armee XXI), the position of Chief of the Armed Forces was introduced. Christophe Keckeis became the first Chief of the Armed Forces, having already served as Chief of the General Staff since January 2003.

== General information ==
The Chief of the Armed Forces is elected by the Federal Council and holds the rank of Korpskommandant (three-star rank, equivalent to Lieutenant General). He leads the Swiss Armed Forces only in time of peace. Only in time of war, a commander-in-chief of the rank of General (four-star rank) is elected by the Federal Assembly.

== List of officeholders ==
No.	Portrait	Name (Birth–Death)	Term of office			Branch	Ref.
No.	Portrait	Name (Birth–Death)	Took office	Left office	Time in office	Branch	Ref.
1		Korpskommandant; Christophe Keckeis (1945–2020)	1 January 2004	31 December 2007	3 years, 364 days	Army	
2		Korpskommandant; Roland Nef (born 1959)	1 January 2008	21 July 2008	202 days	Army	
—		Korpskommandant; André Blattmann (born 1956)	21 July 2008	28 February 2009	222 days	Air Force	
3		Korpskommandant; André Blattmann (born 1956)	1 March 2009	31 December 2016	7 years, 305 days	Air Force	
4		Korpskommandant; Philippe Rebord (born 1957)	1 January 2017	31 December 2019	2 years, 364 days	Army	
5		Korpskommandant; Thomas Süssli (born 1966)	1 January 2020	Incumbent	6 years, 316 days	Army	
