= Awards and decorations of the Swiss Armed Forces =

Switzerland does not have a national honour system. Enshrined in the 1848 Swiss Constitution in Article 12 was a prohibition on the acceptance of honours and titles by Swiss citizens. In the current Swiss constitution there is no specific prohibition on titles and orders, however there is a statute that covers the prohibition previously covered by Article 12.

The Swiss military maintains a system of awards which recognize length of service, training, sports, and mission participation.

== Award ribbons ==
=== Length of Service Decorations ===
Length of Service Decoration
Emblem	Name	Remarks
Ribbon bar image; refer to adjacent text.	Length of Service Decoration; German: Dienstleistungsabzeichen; French: Insigne de prestation de service Italian: Distintivi del servizio	This ribbon is worn with a series of rosettes to indicate total length of service. No rosette indicates 90 days of service.
	Length of Service Decoration	170 days service
	Length of Service Decoration	250 days service
	Length of Service Decoration	350 days service
	Length of Service Decoration	450 days service
	Length of Service Decoration	550 days service
	Length of Service Decoration	650 days service
	Length of Service Decoration	750 days service
	Length of Service Decoration	850 days service
	Length of Service Decoration	950 days service

=== Exceptional service ===
Emblem	Name	Remarks
Ribbon bar image; refer to adjacent text.	Exceptional service German: Ausserordentliche Leistung; French: Prestation exceptionnelle Italian: Prestazione eccezionale	The award is given for: 1. outstanding merits for the position and prestige of the Swiss Army; 2. particularly exemplary, brave and courageous behavior: lifesaving or assistance under difficult conditions; fulfillment of service duty despite obvious danger; extraordinarily brave behavior.; This award is personally given by the Chief of the Armed Forces for outstanding achievements.

=== Decorations ===
These ribbons are worn in place of the older Sugus-type badges (nicknamed for their resemblance of Sugus candies). An exception is the former Alpine Insignia, which looked different and was replaced by the Sugus type.

Alpine Insignia
Emblem	Name	Remarks
Ribbon bar image; refer to adjacent text.	Alpine Decoration; German: Hochgebirgsabzeichen; French: Insigne de haute montagne Italian: Distintivo d’alta montagna	This replaced the Alpine Badge previously issued by the Swiss Army. The Alpine Decoration is awarded to those members of the Swiss Army who have received specialist training in mountain warfare and rescue.
Skill-at-arms Decorations
Ribbon bar image; refer to adjacent text.	Assault Rifle, Level 1 German: Sturmgewehr Stufe 1 French: Fusil d’assaut degré 1 Italian: Fucile d’assalto grado 1	
Ribbon bar image; refer to adjacent text.	Assault Rifle, Level 2 German: Sturmgewehr Stufe 2 French: Fusil d’assaut degré 2 Italian: Fucile d’assalto grado 2	
Ribbon bar image; refer to adjacent text.	Pistol, Level 1 German: Pistole Stufe 1 French: Pistolet degré 1 Italian: Pistola grado 1	
Ribbon bar image; refer to adjacent text.	Pistol, Level 2 German: Pistole Stufe 2 French: Pistolet degré 2 Italian: Pistola grado 2	
Training Decorations
Ribbon bar image; refer to adjacent text.	Buddy Aid/NBC Defence; German: Kameradenhilfe/ABC Abwehr; French: Aide au camarade/défense ABC; Italian: Aiuto al camerata/difesa NBC	
Ribbon bar image; refer to adjacent text.	Coxswain; German: Wasserfahrer; French: Navigateur; Italian: Battelliere	
Ribbon bar image; refer to adjacent text.	Pointer (weapon); German: Richter; French: Pointeur (arme); Italian: Puntatore (arma)	
Sports Decorations
Ribbon bar image; refer to adjacent text.	Military sport 1 German: Militärsport 1 French: Sport militaire 1 Italian: Sport militare 1	
Ribbon bar image; refer to adjacent text.	Military sport 2 German: Militärsport 2 French: Sport militaire 2 Italian: Sport militare 2	
Ribbon bar image; refer to adjacent text.	Military sports competition German: Militärsport Wettkampfauszeichnung; French: Compétition de sport militaire Italian: Sport militare competitivo	

=== Mission insignia ===
Service within Switzerland
Emblem	Name	Remarks
Ribbon bar image; refer to adjacent text.	Operations within Switzerland; German: Inland-Einsätze; French: Engagements à l’intérieur du pays Italian: Impieghi in Svizzera	Awarded for 5 consecutive days of "Assistenzdienst", e.g. at the Annual WEF Meeting Davos. Update this ribbon can be awarded with silver or gold rosettes depending on the duration of the assignment.
Service abroad
Ribbon bar image; refer to adjacent text.	Kosovo Mission Insignia	Awarded for 150 days of service as a member of the Swisscoy.
Ribbon bar image; refer to adjacent text.	Bosnia-Herzegovina Mission Insignia	Awarded for 150 days of service with the Organization for Security and Co-operation in Europe (OSCE) Swiss Headquarters Support Unit (SHQSU) to Bosnia-Herzegovina. This medal is no longer awarded for service in Bosnia and Herzegovina, instead the Operations abroad Peace Support is given to military staff members.
Ribbon bar image; refer to adjacent text.	Korea Mission Insignia	Awarded for 150 days of service with the Neutral Nations Supervisory Commission.
Ribbon bar image; refer to adjacent text.	Namibia Mission Insignia	Awarded for 150 days of service with the United Nations Transition Assistance Group (UNTAG).
Ribbon bar image; refer to adjacent text.	Western Sahara Mission Insignia	Awarded for 150 days of service with the United Nations Mission for the Referendum in Western Sahara (MINURSO).
Ribbon bar image; refer to adjacent text.	Peace Support Mission Insignia	Awarded for 150 days of service in peace support operations outside of the framework of an international organization. Like missions in Bosnia and Herzegovina and all UN missions with UNMAS as a Swiss In-Kind (seconded to the United Nations).
Ribbon bar image; refer to adjacent text.	UN Military Observer Mission Insignia	Awarded for 150 days of service as a military observer with a United Nations Peacekeeping Mission.
Ribbon bar image; refer to adjacent text.	Partnership for Peace Mission Insignia	Awarded for service with NATO Partnership for Peace.
Ribbon bar image; refer to adjacent text.	Long Leave for Military Duties Abroad; German: Lange Ausland-Abkommandierung; French: Service commandé de longue durée à l’étranger Italian: Servizi comandati prolungati	Awarded for at least 150 training days service in a training course of a foreign army as part of the "LAK" program.
Ribbon bar image; refer to adjacent text.	UNO OSCE OTAN Mandates Mission Badge Example	Because of the diversity, all portraits of the ribbons of the UNO / OSCE mandates are not illustrated.

=== Off-duty activities ===
Emblem	Name	Remarks
Ribbon bar image; refer to adjacent text.	Off-duty activity, level 1 German: Ausserdienstliche Tätigkeit Stufe 1 French: Activité hors du service degré 1 Italian: Attività fuori del servizio livello 1	For recognized activities with military umbrella organizations and societies.
Ribbon bar image; refer to adjacent text.	Off-duty activity, level 2 German: Ausserdienstliche Tätigkeit Stufe 2 French: Activité hors du service degré 2 Italian: Attività fuori del servizio livello 2	Further recognized activities and leadership within a military umbrella organization or society.
Ribbon bar image; refer to adjacent text.	Off-duty activity, level 3 German: Ausserdienstliche Tätigkeit Stufe 3 French: Activité hors du service degré 3 Italian: Attività fuori del servizio livello 3	Reaching level 1 and level 2 is not required. 6 years of active membership in a board of directors of a military society or an umbrella organization of its associations or sections.

== Order of wear ==
Awards are worn on the uniform as ribbon bars in rows of three, with a maximum of nine ribbons worn at a time. When the top row of ribbons is less than three, they are worn to the wearers left. Only the highest level of award received is worn. The ribbons are worn in the following order:

- Length of Service Decoration (max 1 Ribbon);
- Decorations:
  - Exceptional service
  - Skill-at-arms Decorations
  - Training Decorations (including Alpine training)
  - Sports Decorations
- Mission Insignia:
  - Operations within Switzerland (max 1 Ribbon)
  - Operations Abroad;
  - UN/OSCE Mandate Missions (max 1 per ribbon)
- Partnership for Peace Mission Insignia
- Long Leave for Military Duties Abroad (LAK)
