= Structure of the Swiss Armed Forces =

This article represents the structure of the Swiss Armed Forces as of 1 February 2025:

== Chief of the Armed Forces ==
- Chief of the Armed Forces, in Bern – Lt. Gen. Benedikt Roos
  - Chief of the Armed Forces Chief of Staff
  - Joint Operations Command / Deputy Chief of the Armed Forces, in Bern – Lt. Gen. Laurent Michaud
  - Training Command, in Bern – Lt. Gen. Gregor Metzler
  - Armed Forces Command Support Organisation, in Bern
  - Armed Forces Logistics Organisation, in Bern
  - Armed Forces Staff, in Bern
    - Medical Service, in Ittigen
    - Armed Forces Planning / Deputy Chief of the Armed Forces Staff
    - Defense International Relations – Maj. Gen. Germaine Seewer
    - Defense Corporate Development / Military Doctrine
    - Defense Personnel Management
    - Defense Finance Management
    - Defense Real Estate Management
    - Military Aviation Authority, at Payerne Air Base

Other Swiss general officers are:

- Defense Attaché Washington
- Defense Attaché Berlin
- Defense Attaché Paris
- Project Manager Support Command
- Swiss Senior Staff Officer at the Geneva Centre for Security Policy
- Swiss Senior Staff Officer at KFOR
- Swiss Military Representative at NATO/EU

The Medical Service (German: Sanität) consists of the following organizational units

- Medical Service, in Ittigen
  - Armed Forces Pharmacy (German: Armeeapotheke), in Ittigen
  - Armed Forces Nursing Service (German: Pflegedienst der Armee), in Ittigen
  - Armed Forces Veterinary Service (German: Veterinärdienst der Armee), in Ittigen
  - Medical Service Personnel Matters (German: Truppenbelange Sanität), in Ittigen
  - Medical Service Inspectorate (German: Sanitätsinspektorat), in Ittigen
  - Coordinated Medical Service (German: Koordinierter Sanitätsdienst), in Ittigen
  - Military Medical Service (German: Militärärztlicher Dienst), in Ittigen
    - 6x Regional Medical Centres in Bière, Chur/Frauenfeld, Monteceneri/Emmen, Payerne, Thun, and Wangen an der Aare
    - 6x Recruitment Centres in Aarau, Mels, Monteceneri, Payerne, Rüti, and Sumiswald
  - Military and Disaster Medicine Competence Centre (German: Kompetenzzentrum für Militär- und Katastrophenmedizin), in Ittigen
  - Medical NBC Defense (German: Medizinische ABC Abwehr), in Ittigen
  - Medical Intelligence, in Ittigen

=== Joint Operations Command ===
The Joint Operations Command (German: Kommando Operationen, French: Commandement des Opérations, Italian: Comando Operazioni) is responsible for planning and conducting Swiss Armed Forces operations.

- **Joint Operations Command**, in Bern
  - Deputy Commander Joint Operations Command, in Bern
  - Joint Operations Command Staff, in Bern
  - Land Forces, in Bern
    - 1st Mechanised Brigade, in Morges
    - 4th Mechanised Brigade, in Liestal
    - 11th Mechanised Brigade, in Chur
  - Air Force, in Bern
    - Air Force Training and Education Brigade, at Payerne Air Base
    - 33rd Anti-aircraft Training Unit, at Emmen Air Base
  - 1st Territorial Division, in Morges
  - 2nd Territorial Division, in Aarau
  - 3rd Territorial Division, in Altdorf
  - 4th Territorial Division, in St. Gallen
  - Military Police Command, in Sitten
  - Military Intelligence Service / Preventive Armed Forces Protection Service, in Bern
  - Special Forces Command, in Rivera
  - SWISSINT Competence Centre, in Oberdorf

The deputy commanders of the Land Forces, Air Force, and the four territorial divisions are brigadier generals.

==== Land Forces ====
The Land Forces (German: Heer, French: Forces terrestres, Italian: Forze terrestri) commands the armed forces' maneuver formations.

- **Land Forces**, in Bern
  - 20th Land Forces Staff Battalion (German: Heeresstabsbataillon 20), in Zürich
  - Command and Specialist Systems Competence Centre (German: Kompetenzzentrum Führungs- und Fachsysteme, in Thun develops and maintains the Land Forces' command and control System and the Integrated Artillery Command and Fire Control System
    - Land Forces Military Support
    - Territorial Divisions Military Support
    - Technical Support

===== 1st Mechanised Brigade =====
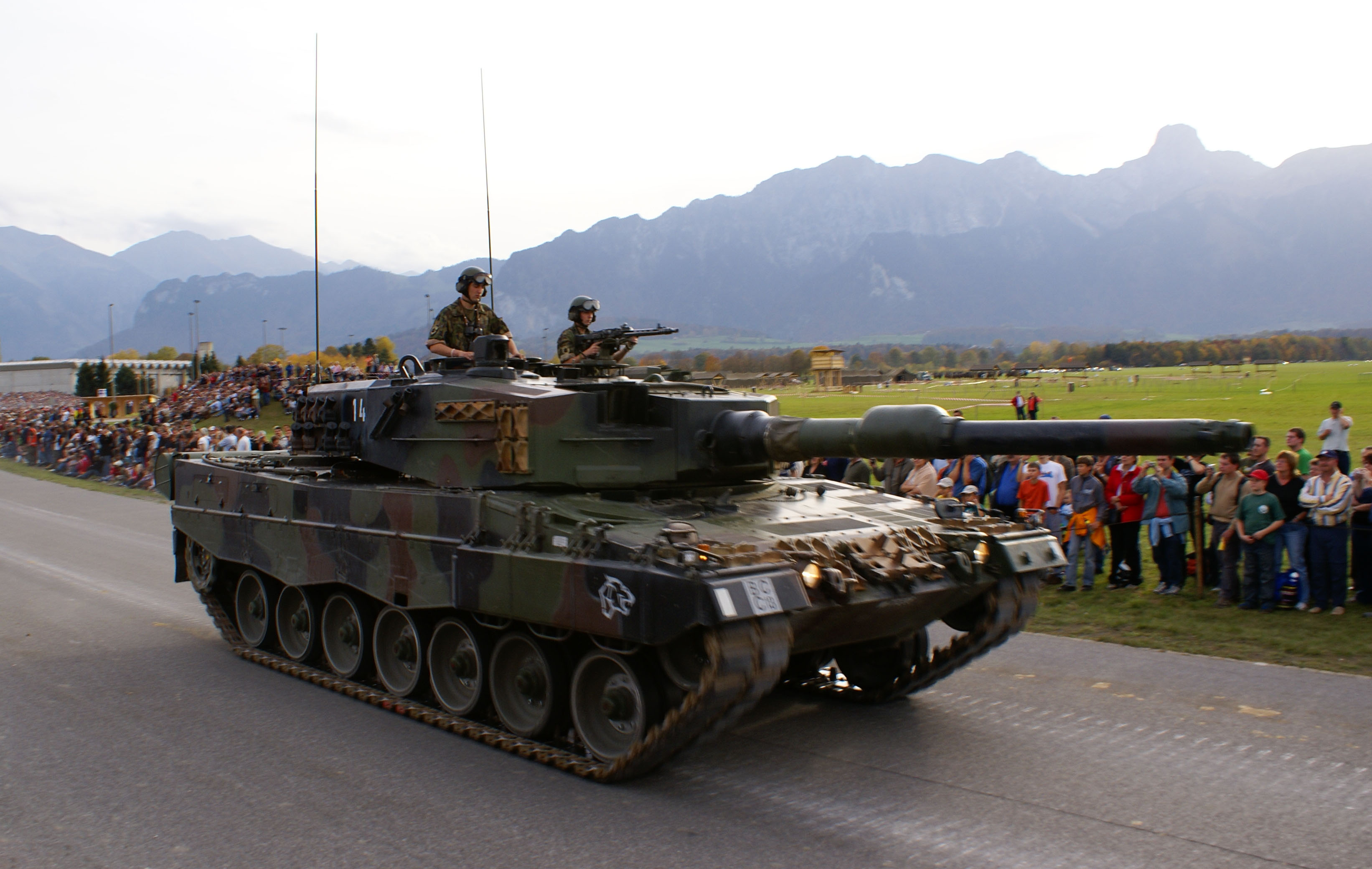
1st Mechanised Brigade Leopard 2A4 main battle tank

The 1st Mechanised Brigade is based in the French-speaking Romandy region and the Canton of Bern.

- **1st Mechanised Brigade** (French: Brigade mécanisée 1), in Morges
  - 1st Mechanised Brigade Staff Battalion (French: Bataillon d'état-major de la brigade mécanisée 1)
  - 1st Reconnaissance Battalion (French: Bataillon d'exploration 1)
  - 7th Mountain Infantry Battalion (French: Bataillon d'infanterie de montagne 7)
  - 12th Panzer Battalion (German: Panzerbataillon 12), in Bern
  - 17th Mechanised Battalion (French: Bataillon mécanisé 17)
  - 18th Mechanised Battalion (French: Bataillon mécanisé 18)
  - 1st Artillery Group (French: Groupe d'artillerie 1)
  - 1st Armoured Sapper Battalion (French: Bataillon de sapeurs de chars 1)

===== 4th Mechanised Brigade =====
The 4th Mechanised Brigade is based in central Switzerland, with the 49th Artillery Group based in the Italian-speaking Canton of Ticino.

- **4th Mechanised Brigade** (German: Mechanisierte Brigade 4), in Liestal
  - 4th Mechanised Brigade Staff Battalion (German: Mechanisierte Brigade Stabsbataillon 4)
  - 4th Reconnaissance Battalion (German: Aufklärungsbataillon 4)
  - 5th Reconnaissance Battalion (German: Aufklärungsbataillon 5)
  - 10th Artillery Group (German: Artillerieabteilung 10)
  - 49th Artillery Group (Italian: Gruppo d'artiglieria 49)
  - 26th Bridge Engineer Battalion (German: Pontonierbataillon 26)

===== 11th Mechanised Brigade =====
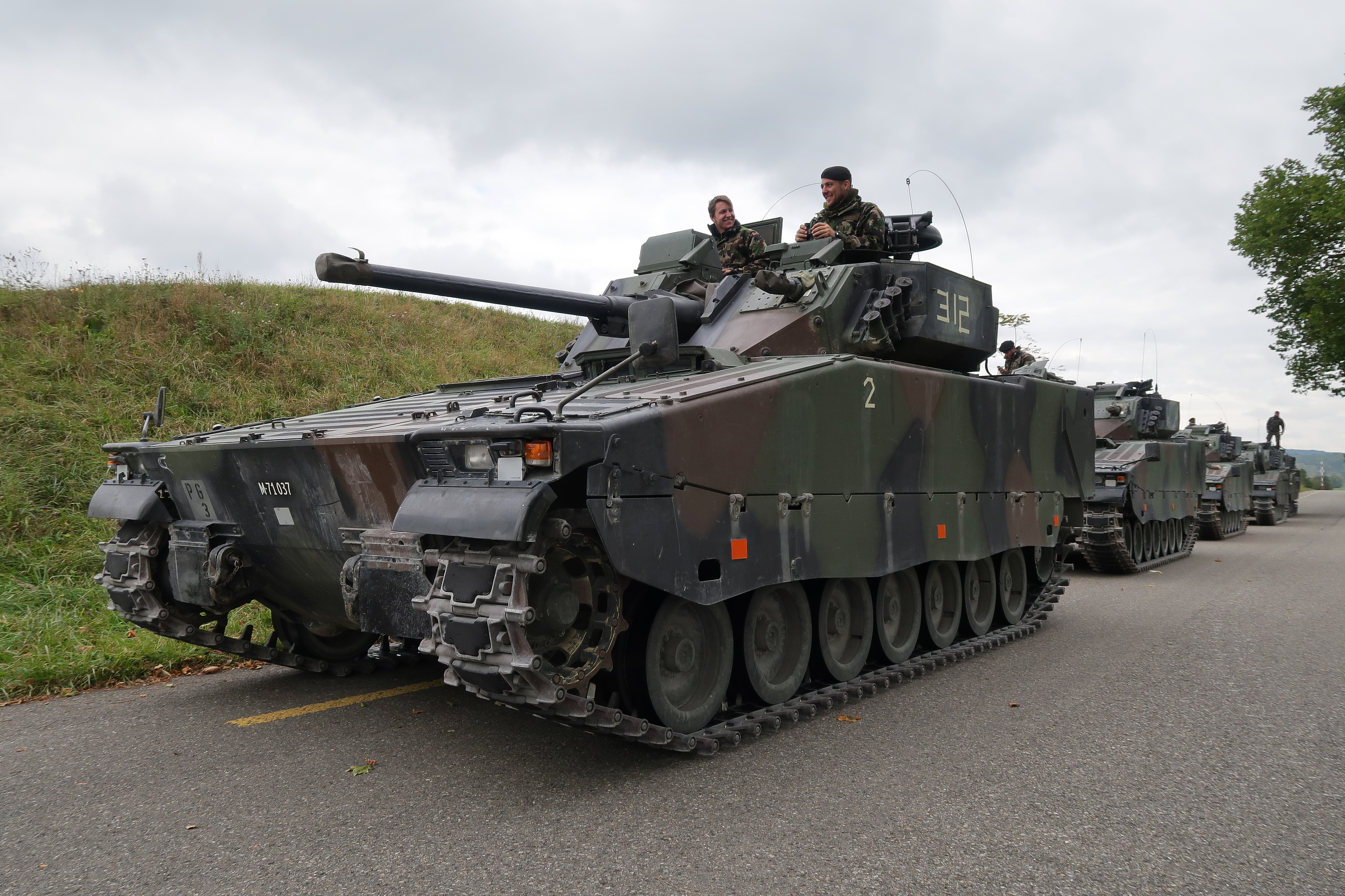
29th Mechanised Battalion CV9030 infantry fighting vehicle

The 11th Mechanised Brigade is based in the Eastern part of German-speaking Switzerland.

- **11th Mechanised Brigade** (German: Mechanisierte Brigade 11), in Chur
  - 11th Mechanised Brigade Staff Battalion (German: Mechanisierte Brigade Stabsbataillon 11)
  - 11th Reconnaissance Battalion (German: Aufklärungsbataillon 11)
  - 13th Panzer Battalion (German: Panzerbataillon 13)
  - 14th Mechanised Battalion (German: Mechanisiertes Bataillon 14)
  - 29th Mechanised Battalion (German: Mechanisiertes Bataillon 29)
  - 16th Artillery Group (German: Artillerieabteilung 16)
  - 11th Armoured Sapper Battalion (German: Panzersappeurbataillon 11)

===== Land Forces battalions structure =====
The battalions of the Land Forces field the following subunits:

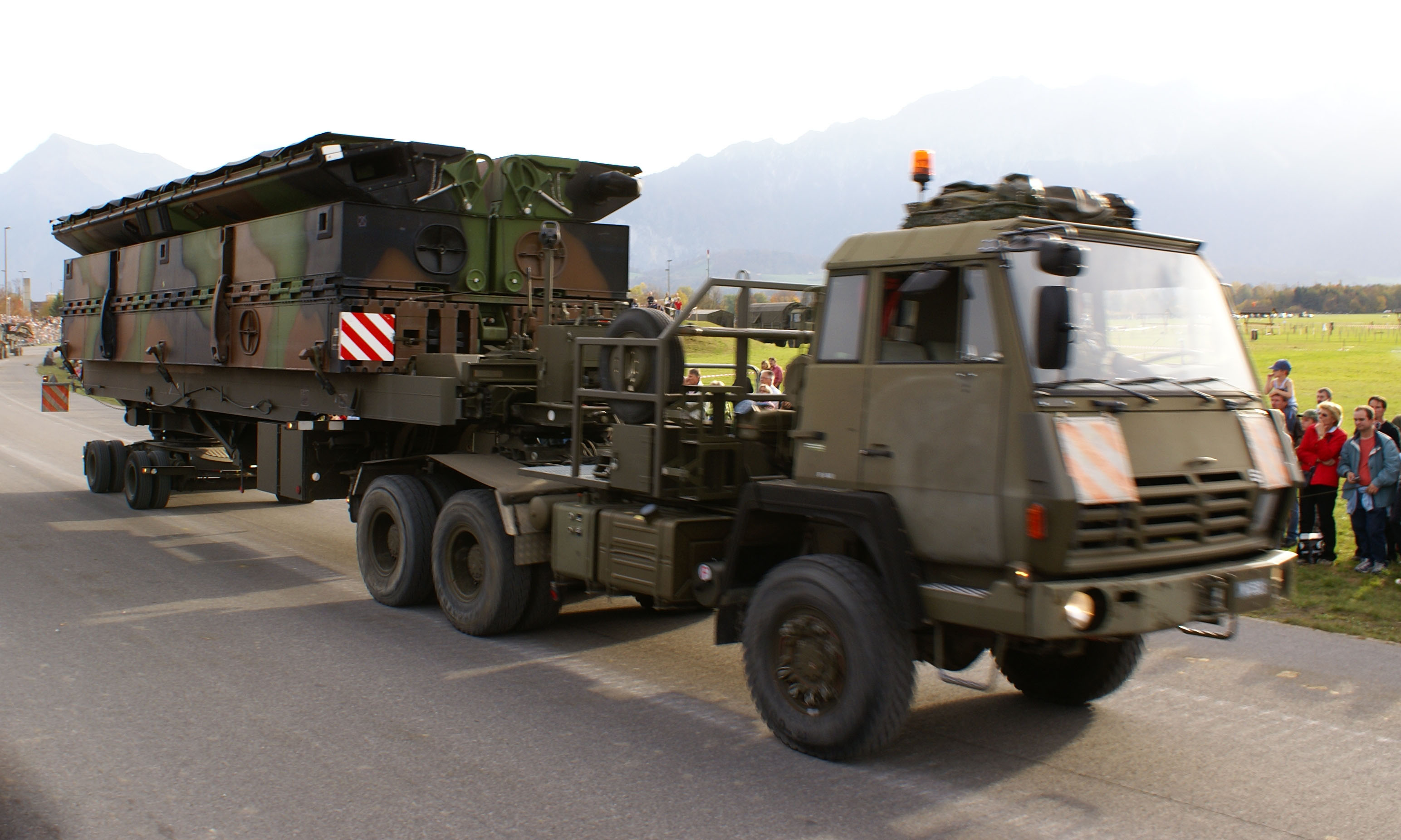
26th Bridge Engineer Battalion motorized floating bridge element

- Brigade staff battalions:
  - Staff company, brigade staff operations company, brigade staff support company, signal company, protection company, and a fire control center battery
- Reconnaissance battalions:
  - Staff company, 3x reconnaissance companies with Eagle I and Eagle II armoured reconnaissance vehicles (to be replaced by Eagle V 6x6 TASYS armoured reconnaissance vehicles), and a logistic company
- Panzer and Mechanised battalions:
  - Staff company, 2x Panzer companies with Leopard 2A4 WE main battle tanks, 2x Panzergrenadier companies with CV9030CH infantry fighting vehicles, and a logistic company
- Artillery groups:
  - Fire control battery, 3x artillery batteries with M109 KAWEST 155mm self-propelled howitzers and Eagle III armoured artillery command vehicles, and a logistic battery (each group will add a mortar battery with eight 120mm mortars mounted on Piranha V armoured fighting vehicles by 2024)
- Armoured sapper battalions:
  - Staff company, 3x armoured sapper companies with Kodiak armoured engineering vehicles and Leguan armoured vehicle-launched bridges, and a logistic company
- Bridge engineer battalion:
  - Staff company, 3x bridge engineer companies with Motorized Floating Bridges, Medium Girder Bridges and 46m Support Bridges, and a logistic company

==== Air Force ====
Swiss Air Force locations, 2018
Fighters Helicopters other flying units Operations Centre Radar station
- **Air Force** (German: Luftwaffe), in Bern
  - Air Force Staff (German: Luftwaffenstab), in Bern
  - Air Force Operations Centre, at Dübendorf Air Base
    - FLORAKO radar stations on Pilatus, Scopi, Weisshorn and Weissfluh mountains
    - Swiss Federal Government's Air Transport Service (German: Lufttransportdienst des Bundes), at Bern Airport (VIP flights)
  - Aeromedical Center, at Dübendorf Air Base (German: Fliegerärztliches Institut)
    - AMC Director's Staff
    - Flight Medicine Section
    - Flight Psychology Section

===== 31st Aviation Brigade =====
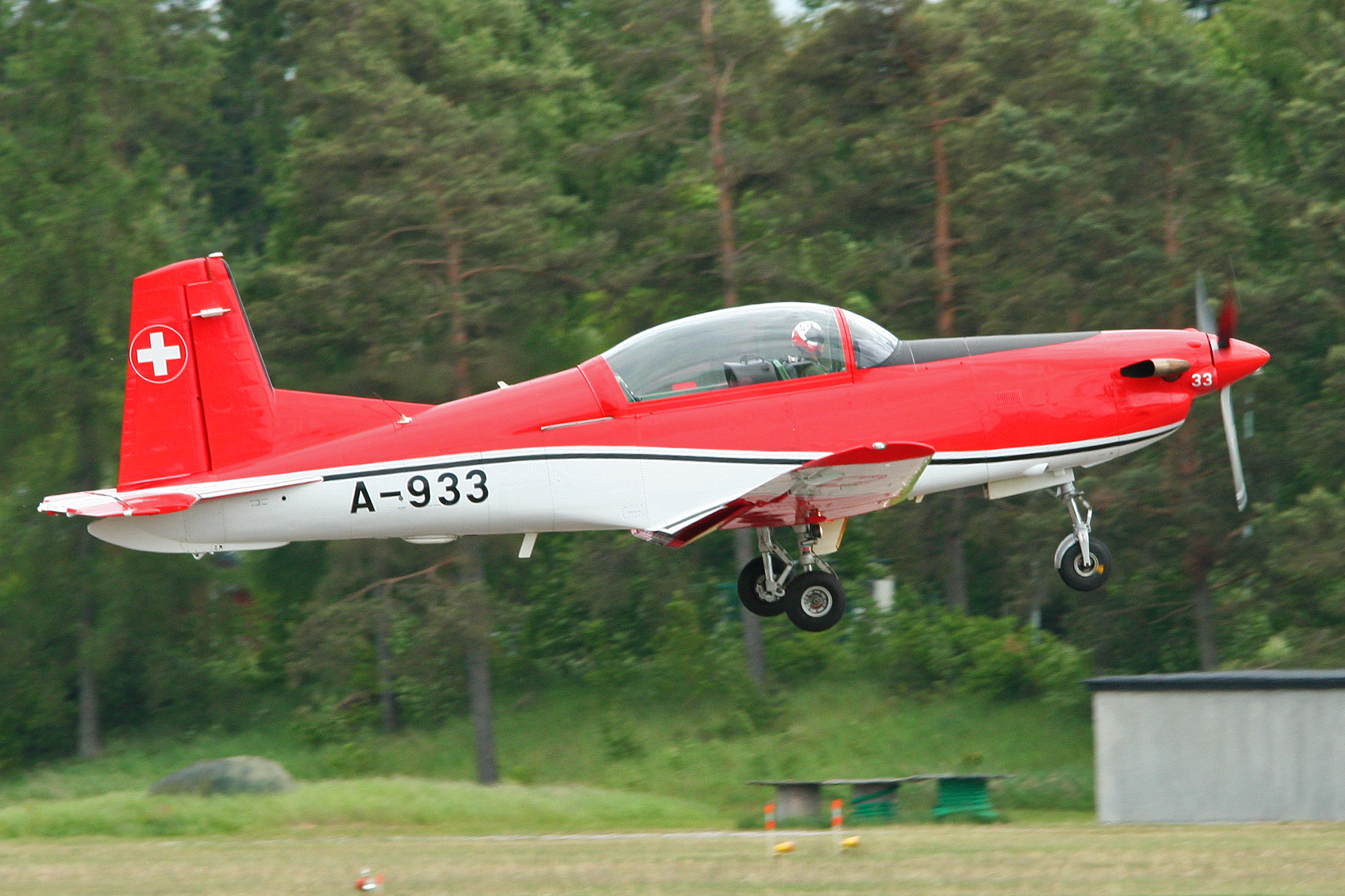
Swiss Air Force PC-7 Turbo Trainer

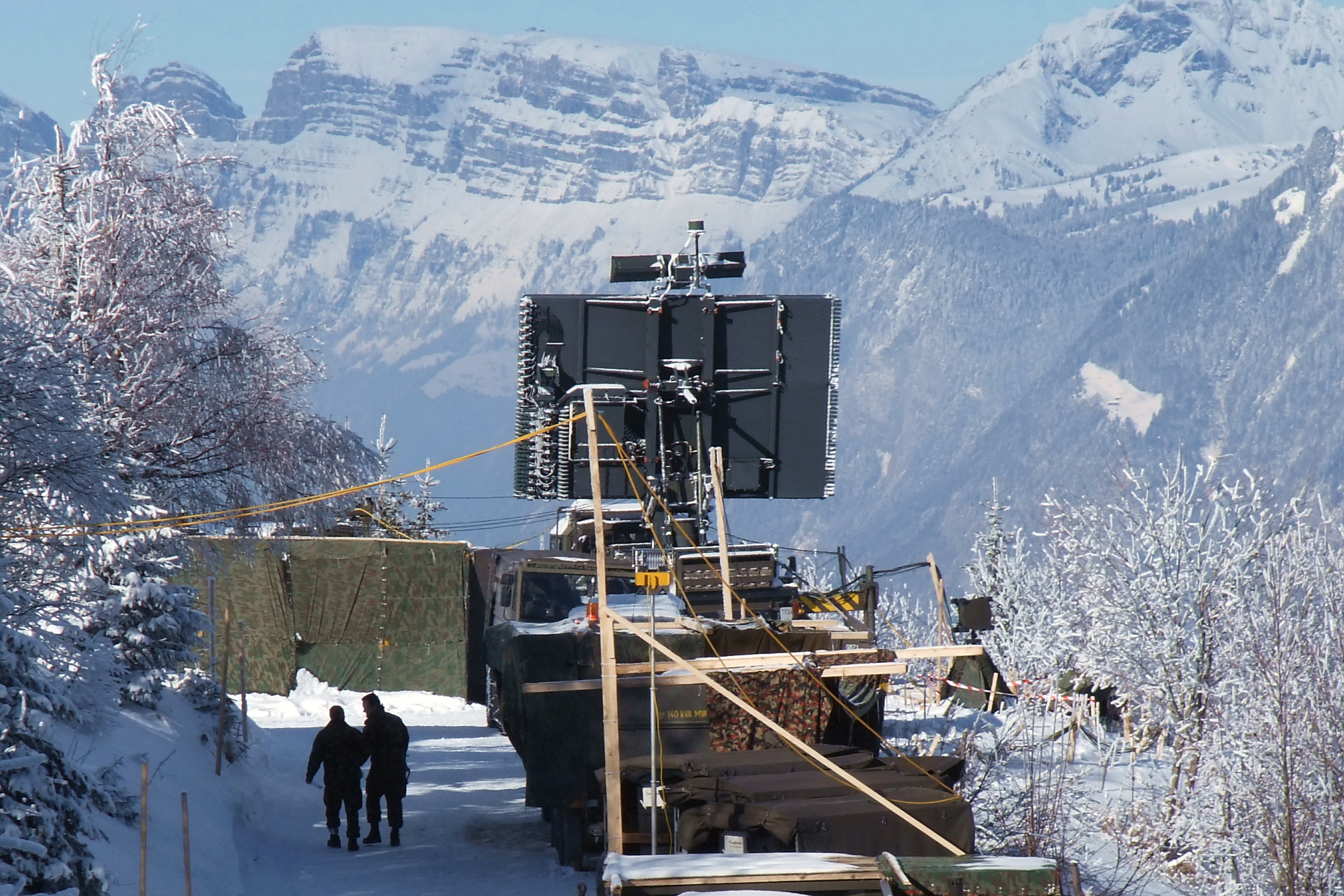
Swiss Air Force TAFLIR mobile radar near Pfäfers

The 31st Aviation Brigade (French: Brigade d’aviation 31) trains the air force's personnel.

- **31st Aviation Brigade**, at Payerne Air Base
  - 31st Aviation Brigade Staff (French: Etat-major brigade d’aviation 31), at Payerne Air Base
    - Intelligence Service Training Cell (German: Zelle Training Nachrichtendienst), at Emmen Air Base trains air force's intelligence officers
    - Parachute Reconnaissance Cell (Italian: Cellula esploratori paracadutisti), at Locarno Air Base
  - 81st Aviation School (French: Ecole d'aviation 81), at Payerne Air Base trains the air force's ground personnel
  - 82nd Air Force Training Command (German: Luftwaffen Trainingskommando 82), at Dübendorf Air Base trains the air force's intelligence, signals, command support, and radar troops
  - 85th Air Force Pilots School (German: Pilotenschule Luftwaffe 85), at Locarno Air Base trains the air force's pilots
    - 14th Instrument Flying Squadron (German: Instrumentenfliegerstaffel 14), at Locarno Air Base with PC-7 Turbo Trainer and PC-21 planes
  - Air Force Officers School (German: Luftwaffen Offiziersschule), at Dübendorf Air Base
  - 1st Air Force Intelligence Group (German: Luftwaffen Nachrichten Abteilung 1), at Dübendorf Air Base
  - 2nd Air Force Intelligence Group (German: Luftwaffen Nachrichten Abteilung 2), at Dübendorf Air Base
  - 2nd Mobile Air Force Radar Group (German: Mobile Luftwaffen Radar Abteilung 2), at Dübendorf Air Base

The groups of the Air Force Training and Education Brigade field the following subunits:

- Air force intelligence groups:
  - Staff company, 4x air force intelligence companies
- Mobile air force radar group:
  - Staff company, 2x mobile air force radar companies with TAFLIR mobile radars

===== Airfield Command Alpnach/Dübendorf =====
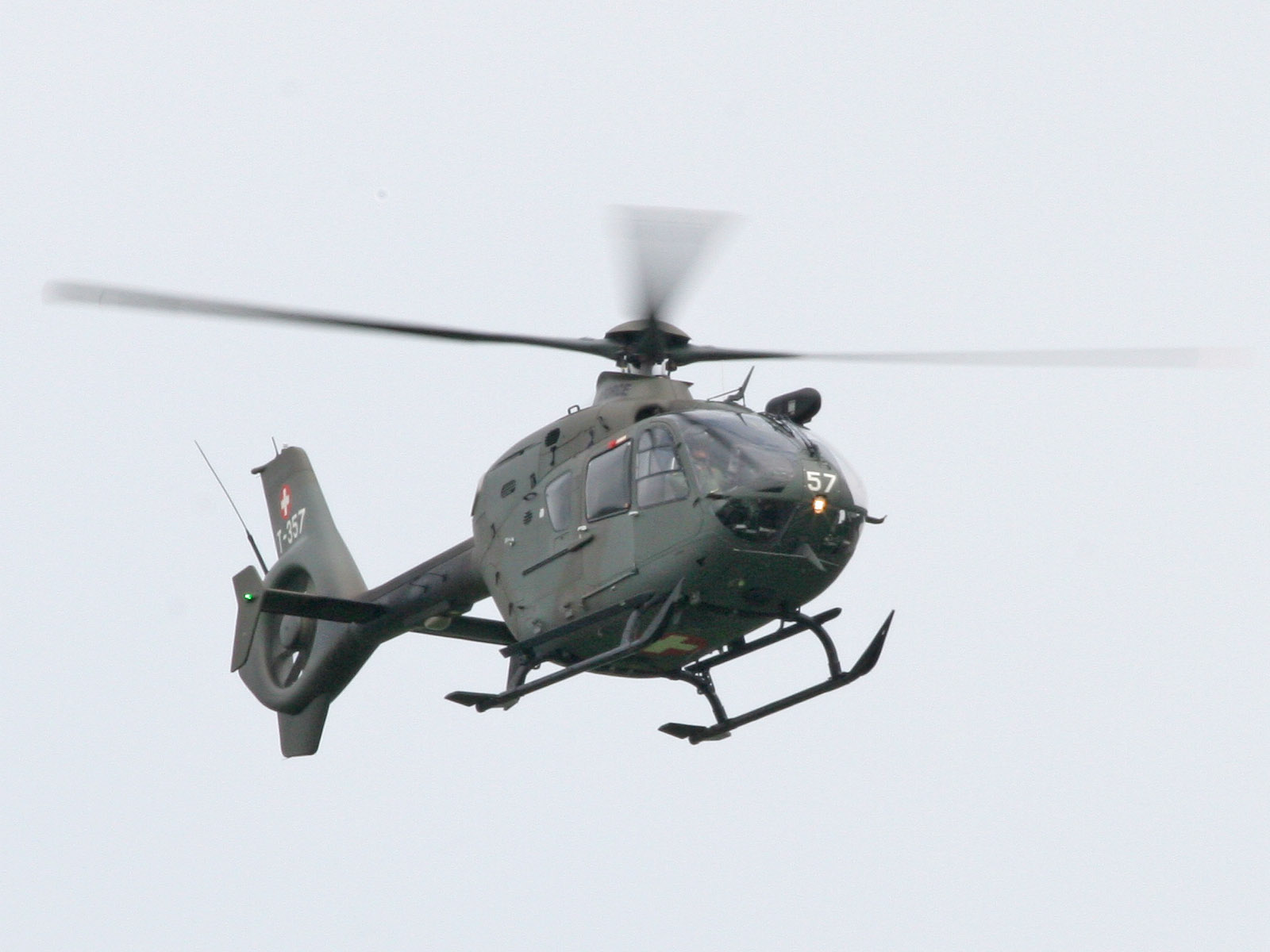
Swiss Air Force EC 635 helicopter

The Airfield Command Alpnach/Dübendorf (German: Flugplatzkommando Alpnach/Dübendorf) consists of two helicopter formations.

- **Airfield Command Alpnach/Dübendorf**, at Alpnach Air Base
  - Airfield Command Staff (German: Stab Flugplatzkommando), at Alpnach Air Base
  - 2nd Air Transport Wing (German: Lufttransportgeschwader 2)
    - 6th Air Transport Squadron (German: Lufttransport Staffel 6), with Super Puma, Cougar and EC 635 helicopters
    - 8th Air Transport Squadron (German: Lufttransport Staffel 8), with Super Puma, Cougar and EC 635 helicopters
  - Flight Operations Support (German: Support Flugbetrieb)
  - Airfield Dübendorf (German: Flugplatz Dübendorf), at Dübendorf Air Base
    - 3rd Air Transport Wing (German: Lufttransportgeschwader 3)
      - 3rd Air Transport Squadron (German: Lufttransport Staffel 3), with Super Puma, Cougar and EC 635 helicopters
      - 4th Air Transport Squadron (German: Lufttransport Staffel 4), with Super Puma, Cougar and EC 635 helicopters
    - Flight Operations Support (German: Support Flugbetrieb)

===== Airfield Command Emmen =====
Airfield Command Emmen (German: Flugplatzkommando Emmen) besides its own flying squadrons also hosts units of the Air Force Training and Education Brigade and the Patrouille Suisse aerobatic team.

- **Airfield Command Emmen**, at Emmen Air Base
  - Airfield Command Staff (German: Stab Flugplatzkommando)
  - Flight Operations
    - Patrouille Suisse with twelve F-5E Tiger II fighter jets
    - 7th Air Transport Squadron (German: Lufttransport Staffel 7) with PC-6 Porter planes
    - 12th Target Squadron (German: Zielflugstaffel 12) with F-5 fighter jets and PC-9 planes
  - 19th Fighter Squadron (German: Fliegerstaffel 19) with F-5 fighter jets
  - Flight Simulators
  - Flight Operations Support (German: Support Flugbetrieb)
  - 84th Unmanned Aerial Vehicle Command (German: Drohnen Kommando 84), at Emmen Air Base
    - 7th Unmanned Aerial Vehicle Squadron (German: Drohnen Staffel 7), at Emmen Air Base with six Hermes 900 unmanned aerial vehicles

===== Airfield Command Locarno =====
Airfield Command Locarno (Italian: Comando d'aerodromo Locarno) hosts and supports the 85th Air Force Pilots School, maintains the PC-6 Porter, PC-7 Turbo Trainer, and PC-9 planes, and hosts the parachute training of the Swiss Armed Forces.

- **Airfield Command Locarno**, at Locarno Air Base
  - Airfield Command Staff (Italian: Stato maggiore comando d'aerodromo)
  - Flight Operations Support (Italian: Support volo), supports the 14th Instrument Flying Squadron
  - Flight Simulators (Italian: Simulatori di volo), with PC-7 Turbo Trainer simulators

===== Airfield Command Meiringen/Bern =====
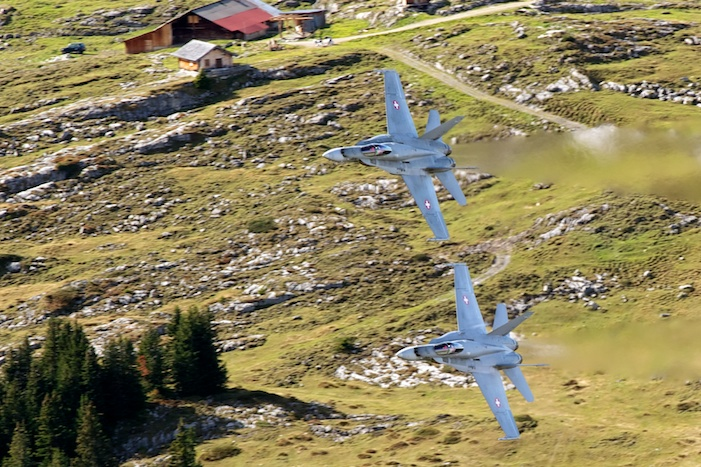
Two Swiss Air Force F/A-18C Hornet fighter jets above Axalp

Airfield Command Meiringen/Bern (German: Flugplatzkommando Meiringen/Bern) is one of two fighter bases of the air force. The command also supports the Swiss Federal Government's Air Transport Service at Bern Airport.

- **Airfield Command Meiringen/Bern**, at Meiringen Air Base
  - Airfield Command Staff (German: Stab Flugplatzkommando)
  - 13th Fighter Wing (German: Fliegergeschwader 13)
    - 8th Fighter Squadron (German: Fliegerstaffel 8) with F-5 fighter jets
    - 11th Fighter Squadron (German: Fliegerstaffel 11) with F/A-18 Hornet fighter jets
  - Flight Operations Support (German: Support Flugbetrieb)

===== Airfield Command Payerne =====
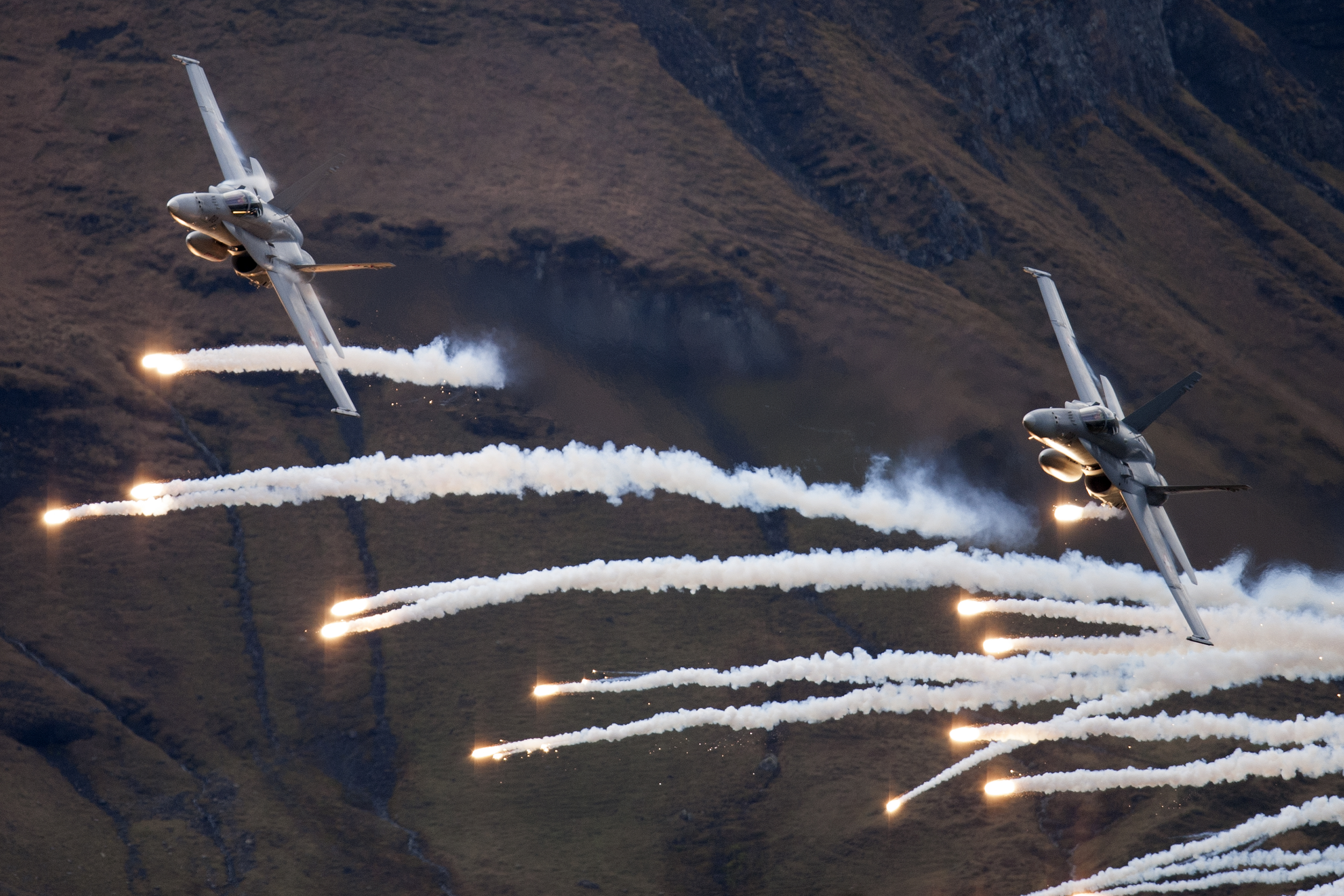
Two Swiss Air Force F/A-18C Hornet fighter jets above releasing flares

Airfield Command Payerne (French: Commandement base aérienne Payerne) is one of two fighter bases of the air force. The command also supports the Swiss Federal Government's Air Transport Service at Bern Airport.

- **Airfield Command Payerne**, at Payerne Air Base
  - Airfield Command Staff (French: Etat-major Commandement base aérienne)
  - 1st Air Transport Wing (French: Escadre de transport aérien 1)
    - 1st Air Transport Squadron (French: Escadrille de transport aérien 1), with Super Puma, Cougar and EC 635 helicopters
    - 5th Air Transport Squadron (French: Escadrille de transport aérien 5), with Super Puma, Cougar and EC 635 helicopters
  - 11th Fighter Wing (French: Escadre aviation 11)
    - 17th Fighter Squadron (French: Escadrille d'aviation 17) with F/A-18 Hornet fighter jets
    - 18th Fighter Squadron (French: Escadrille d'aviation 18) with F/A-18 Hornet fighter jets
  - 14th Fighter Wing (French: Escadre aviation 14), part-time conscript unit
    - 6th Fighter Squadron (French: Escadrille d'aviation 6) with F-5 fighter jets
  - Flight Operations Support (French: Support Service de vol)
  - Simulation and Formation Support (French: Support Simulation et Formation) with F/A-18 Hornet simulators and Simulated Aircraft Maintenance Trainers
    - Polymechanics and Electronics Apprentices Formation Centre (French: Centre de formation des apprentis polymécaniciens et électroniciens)
    - Sion Polymechanics Apprentices Formation Centre (French: Centre de formation des apprentis polymécaniciens de Sion), at Sion Airport

===== 33rd Ground-Based Air Defense Brigade =====
The 33rd Ground-Based Air Defense Brigade (German: Bodengestützte Luftverteidigungsbrigade 33) trains the armed forces' air defense troops. In wartime the guided missiles groups' fire units would be dispersed to protect formations or locations, while the medium anti-aircraft group's batteries would each protect an air force airfield.

- **33rd Ground-Based Air Defense Brigade**, at Emmen Air Base
  - 33rd Ground-Based Air Defense Brigade Staff (German: Stab Bodengestützte Luftverteidigungsbrigade 33)
  - 33rd Ground-based Air Defense School (German: Boden-gestützte Luftverteidigung Schule 33 (BODLUV 33))
    - 1st Light Anti-aircraft Guided Missiles Group (French: Groupe d’engins guidés léger de défense contre avions 1)
    - 5th Light Anti-aircraft Guided Missiles Group (German: Leichte Fliegerabwehr Lenkwaffen Abteilung 5)
    - 7th Light Anti-aircraft Guided Missiles Group (German: Leichte Fliegerabwehr Lenkwaffen Abteilung 7)
    - 32nd Medium Anti-aircraft Group (German: Mittlere Fliegerabwehr Abteilung 32)
    - 34th Medium Anti-aircraft Group (German: Mittlere Fliegerabwehr Abteilung 34)
    - 45th Medium Anti-aircraft Group (German: Mittlere Fliegerabwehr Abteilung 45)

The anti-aircraft groups field the following subunits:

- Light anti-aircraft guided missile groups:
  - 2x light anti-aircraft guided missile batteries with 16 fire units and four observer teams each; each fire unit fields one FIM-92 Stinger launcher and carries three missiles in total, while each observer team operates one ALERT tactical radar
- Medium anti-aircraft groups:
  - 2x medium anti-aircraft batteries with four fire units each; each fire unit fields one Skyguard radar and two GDF 005 35mm twin cannons

===== Wartime air wing structure =====
In peace the Swiss air bases are operated by a small professional cadre and rotating conscript troops. In wartime the six wings of the air force would increase in size to allow for high intensity operations. In wartime the structure of the Swiss air wings would be as follows:

For the three (1st, 2nd, 3rd) transport wings the example given is for the 2nd Air Transport Wing (peacetime units in bold):

- 2nd Air Transport Command (German: Lufttransport Kommando 2)
  - **2nd Air Transport Wing** (German: Lufttransportgeschwader 2)
    - **6th Air Transport Squadron** (German: Lufttransport Staffel 6)
    - **8th Air Transport Squadron** (German: Lufttransport Staffel 8)
    - 2nd Air Transport Company (German: Lufttransport Kompanie 2)
  - 2nd Air Transport Group (German: Lufttransport Abteilung 2)
    - 2nd Air Transport Command Support Company (German: Lufttransport Führungsunterstützungskompanie 2)
    - 2nd Air Transport Support Company (German: Lufttransport Support Kompanie 2)
    - 2nd Air Transport Logistic Company (German: Lufttransport Logistikkompanie 2)
  - 2nd Air Transport Protection Company (German: Lufttransport Sicherungskompanie 2)

For the three (11th, 13th, 14th) fighter wings the example given is for the 13th Fighter Wing (peacetime units in bold):

- 11th Aviation Unit Command (French: Commandement formation d'aviation 11)
  - **11th Fighter Wing** (French: Escadre aviation 11)
    - **17th Fighter Squadron** (French: Escadrille d'aviation 17)
    - **18th Fighter Squadron** (French: Escadrille d'aviation 18)
    - 11th Fighter Company (German: Compagnie d'aviation 11)
  - 11th Airfield Group (French: Groupe aérodrome 11)
    - 11th Fighter Command Support Company (French: Compagnie aide au commandement 11)
    - 11th Fighter Support Company (French: Compagnie Support 11)
    - 11th Fighter Logistic Company (French: Compagnie logistique 11)
  - 11th Air Base Protection Company (French: Compagnie sûreté base aérienne 11)

==== 1st Territorial Division ====
The 1st Territorial Division (French: Division territoriale 1, German: Territorialdivision 1) is based in the French-speaking Romandy region and the bilingual Canton of Bern. Its area of responsibility includes the cantons of Bern, Fribourg, Geneva, Jura, Neuchâtel, Valais, and Vaud.

- **1st Territorial Division**, in Morges
  - 1st Engineer Staff (French: Etat-major d'ingénieurs 1) overseeing buildings and constructions
  - 1st Coordination Office (French: Office de coordination 1) managing the training areas
  - 1st Territorial Division Staff Battalion (French: Bataillon d'état-major de la division territoriale 1)
  - 1st Carabiniers Battalion (French: Bataillon de carabiniers 1)
  - 13th Infantry Battalion (German: Infanteriebataillon 13)
  - 14th Carabiniers Battalion (French: Bataillon de carabiniers 14)
  - 19th Infantry Battalion (French: Bataillon d'infanterie 19)
  - 2nd Engineer Battalion (French: Bataillon du génie 2)
  - 1st Civil Protection Battalion (French: Bataillon de sauvetage 1)
  - Patrouille des Glaciers Command (French: Commandement de la Patrouille des Glaciers)

==== 2nd Territorial Division ====
The 2nd Territorial Division (German: Territorialdivision 2) is based in the German-speaking part of Northern Switzerland and responsible for the cantons of Aargau, Basel-Stadt, Basel-Landschaft, Luzern, Nidwalden, Obwalden, and Solothurn.

- **2nd Territorial Division**, in Aarau
  - 2nd Engineer Staff (German: Ingenieurstab 2) overseeing buildings and constructions
  - 2nd Coordination Office (German: Koordinationsstelle 2) managing the training areas
  - 2nd Territorial Division Staff Battalion (German: Territorialdivision Stabsbataillon 2)
  - 11th Light Infantry Battalion (German: Leichtes Infanteriebataillon 11)
  - 20th Infantry Battalion (German: Infanteriebataillon 20)
  - 56th Infantry Battalion (German: Infanteriebataillon 56)
  - 97th Infantry Battalion (German: Infanteriebataillon 97)
  - 6th Engineer Battalion (German: Geniebataillon 6)
  - 2nd Civil Protection Battalion (German: Rettungsbataillon 2)

==== 3rd Territorial Division ====
The 3rd Territorial Division (German: Territorialdivision 3, Italian: Divisione territoriale 3) is based in the German-speaking central part of Switzerland and the Italian-speaking Canton of Ticino. Its area of responsibility includes the cantons of Graubünden, Schwyz, Ticino, Uri, and Zug.

- **3rd Territorial Division**, in Altdorf
  - 3rd Engineer Staff (German: Ingenieurstab 3) overseeing buildings and constructions
  - 3rd Coordination Office (German: Koordinationsstelle 3) managing the training areas
  - 3rd Territorial Division Staff Battalion (German: Territorialdivision Stabsbataillon 3)
  - 29th Mountain Infantry Battalion (German: Gebirgsinfanteriebataillon 29)
  - 30th Mountain Infantry Battalion (Italian: Battaglione di fanteria di montagna 30)
  - 48th Mountain Infantry Battalion (German: Gebirgsinfanteriebataillon 48)
  - 91st Mountain Infantry Battalion (German: Gebirgsinfanteriebataillon 91)
  - 9th Engineer Battalion (German: Geniebataillon 9)
  - 3rd Civil Protection Battalion (Italian: Battaglione di salvataggio 3)

==== 4th Territorial Division ====
The 4th Territorial Division (German: Territorialdivision 4) is based in the German-speaking Eastern part of Switzerland and responsible for the cantons of Appenzell Ausserrhoden, Appenzell Innerrhoden, Glarus, St. Gallen, Schaffhausen, Thurgau, and Zürich.

- **4th Territorial Division**, in St. Gallen
  - 4th Engineer Staff (German: Ingenieurstab 4) overseeing buildings and constructions
  - 4th Coordination Office (German: Koordinationsstelle 4) managing the training areas
  - 4th Territorial Division Staff Battalion (German: Territorialdivision Stabsbataillon 4)
  - 6th Mountain Schützen Battalion (German: Gebirgsschützenbataillon 6)
  - 61st Infantry Battalion (German: Infanteriebataillon 61)
  - 65th Infantry Battalion (German: Infanteriebataillon 65)
  - 85th Mountain Infantry Battalion (German: Gebirgsinfanteriebataillon 85)
  - 23rd Engineer Battalion (German: Geniebataillon 23)
  - 4th Civil Protection Battalion (German: Rettungsbataillon 4)

===== Territorial Division battalion structure =====
The battalions of the territorial divisions field the following subunits:

- Territorial division staff battalions:
  - Territorial division staff company, territorial division staff operations company, signal company, protection company, and a reconnaissance company
- Infantry, carabiniers, mountain infantry, and mountain Schützen battalions:
  - Staff company, 3x infantry companies with a mix of Piranha and Duro IIIP armoured fighting vehicles, and a combat support company consisting of three 81mm mortar platoons, an artillery observer platoon, and a sniper platoon
- Engineer battalions:
  - Staff company, 2x sapper companies, 1x bridge engineer company with Motorized Floating Bridges, Medium Girder Bridges, and 46m Support Bridges
- Civil protection battalions:
  - Staff company, 3x civil protection companies

==== Military Police Command ====
The Military Police Command (German: Kommando Militärpolizei, French: Commandement de la police militaire, Italian: Comando della polizia militare) is the Swiss Armed forces Military Police formation and staffed with professional and conscript soldiers.

- **Military Police Command**, in Sitten
  - Military Police Command Staff (German: Stab Kommando Militärpolizei)
    - Military Police Operations Centre (German: Militärpolizei Einsatzzentrale)
    - Military Police Situation Centre (German: Militärpolizei Lagezentrum)
    - Military Police Security Transports (German: Sicherheitstransporte der Militärpolizei)
  - Military Police Operations Command (German: Einsatzkommando Militärpolizei)
    - Military Accident and Damage Prevention (German: Militärische Unfall- und Schadenprävention)
    - Military Criminal Police (German: Militärische Kriminalpolizei)
    - Panzer Transport Office (German: Büro Panzerverschiebungen)
    - Legal Assistance Office (German: Büro Rechtshilfe)
  - Military Police Security Service Operations Command (German: Einsatzkommando Militärpolizei Sicherheitsdienst) guarding critical militaryinfrastructure
  - Military Police Search and Protection Operations Command (German: Einsatzkommando Militärpolizei Fahndung und Schutz) tasked with preventing espionage, sabotage, and crime
  - 1st Military Police Battalion (French: Bataillon de police militaire 1)
  - 2nd Military Police Battalion (German: Militärpolizeibataillon 2)
  - 3rd Military Police Battalion (German: Militärpolizeibataillon 3)
  - 4th Military Police Battalion (German: Militärpolizeibataillon 4)
  - Military Police Competence Centre (German: Kompetenzzentrum Militärpolizei) training members of the military police
    - Military Police Readiness Company (German: Militärpolizei Bereitschaftskompanie)

The battalions of the Military Police Command field the following subunits:

- Military police battalions:
  - Military police staff company, 2x military police companies, and a military police grenadier company

==== Special Forces Command ====
The Special Forces Command (German: Kommando Spezialkräfte, French: Commandement des forces spéciales, Italian: Comando forze speciali, abbreviated KSK) is based in the Canton of Ticino.

- **Special Forces Command**, in Rivera
  - Special Forces Command Staff Battalion (German: Kommando Spezialkräfte Stabsbataillon), in Monteceneri
  - 20th Grenadier Battalion (German: Grenadierbataillon 20), in Isone
  - 30th Grenadier Battalion (French: Bataillon de grenadiers 30), in Isone
  - 17th Parachute Reconnaissance Company (German: Fallschirmaufklärerkompanie 17), in Isone
  - 10th Armed Forces Reconnaissance Detachment (Special Forces unit), in Monteceneri
  - Military Police Special Detachment (German: Militärpolizei Spezial-Detachement, VIP protection unit), in Worblaufen
  - Special Forces Training Centre (German: Ausbildungszentrum Spezialkräfte), at the Isone Weapons Range

The battalions of the Special Forces Command field the following subunits:

- Special forces command staff battalion:
  - Staff company, command operations company, protection company, and a Grenadier support company
- Grenadier battalions:
  - Grenadier staff company, 3x Grenadier companies (Direct Action), Grenadier reconnaissance company (Special Reconnaissance), and a Grenadier support company

=== Training Command ===
The Training Command (German: Kommando Ausbildung, French: Commandement de l'Instruction, Italian: Comando Istruzione) is responsible for planning, steering and carrying out the training and education of troops of all ranks, including officers, units and staffs.

- **Training Command**, in Bern
  - Training Command Staff, in Bern
  - Armed Forces College / Deputy Commander Training Command, in Luzern
    - General Staff School, in Kriens
    - Military Academy at ETH Zurich, in Birmensdorf
    - Central School, in Luzern
    - Career NCO School, in Herisau
  - Armed Forces Personnel, in Bern
  - Infantry Training Unit, in Colombier
  - Panzer and Artillery Training Unit, in Thun
  - Engineer/ Civil Protection/ NBC Training Unit, in Zuchwil
  - Command Support Training Unit, at Dübendorf Air Base
  - Logistic Training Unit, in Thun
  - Armed Forces Training Centre, in Walenstadt

==== Armed Forces College ====
The Armed Forces College (German: Höhere Kaderausbildung der Armee) provides leadership and staff training for conscript officers, career officers and non-commissioned officers. Furthermore the college's Military Academy at ETH Zurich is Switzerland's leading military science research institution.

- **Armed Forces College**, in Luzern
  - General Staff School (German: Generalstabsschule), in Kriens
  - Military Academy at ETH Zurich (German: Militärakademie an der ETH Zürich), in Birmensdorf
  - Central School (German: Zentralschule), in Luzern
    - Leadership Training Centre (German: Zentrum Führungsausbildung)
    - Formation Leadership Course (German: Führungslehrgang Truppenkörper)
    - Unit Leadership Course (German: Führungslehrgang Einheit)
    - Management, Information and Communication Training Command (German: Kommando Management-, Informations- und Kommunikationsausbildung)
  - Career NCO School (German: Berufsunteroffiziersschule), in Herisau
  - Operational Training (German: Operative Schulung), in Bern

==== Armed Forces Personnel ====
The Armed Forces Personnel (German: Personelles der Armee) is the personnel management department of the Swiss Armed Forces.

- **Armed Forces Personnel**, in Bern
  - Governance and Guidelines (German: Steuerung und Vorgaben)
  - Human Resources Management (German: Personalbewirtschaftung)
  - Recruitment Command (German: Kommando Rekrutierung)
  - Swiss Armed Forces Diversity (German: Diversity Schweizer Armee)
  - Armed Forces Service Member Prevention and Care (German: Prävention und Betreuung Angehöriger der Armee), in Thun
    - Armed Forces Pastoral Care (German: Armeeseelsorge), in Thun
    - Armed Forces Psychological-pedagogical Service (German: Psychologisch-Pädagogische Dienst der Armee), in Thun
    - Armed Forces Social Service (German: Sozialdienst der Armee), in Thun

==== Infantry Training Unit ====
The Infantry Training Unit (French: Formation d’application de l'infanterie) trains the armed forces' infantry troops, military police, and musicians.

- **Infantry Training Unit**, in Colombier
  - 2nd Infantry School (French: Ecole de l'infanterie 2), in Colombier
    - Chamblon Weapons Range (French: Place d'armes de Chamblon), in Chamblon
  - 10th Infantry Officers School (German: Infanterie Offiziersschule 10), in Liestal
  - 11th Infantry School (German: Infanterieschule 11), in St. Gallen
  - 12th Infantry School (German: Infanterieschule 12), in Chur
    - Chur Weapons Range (German: Waffenplatz Chur), in Chur
  - 14th Infantry Full Time Troops School (German: Infanterie Durchdienerschule 14), in Birmensdorf
  - 18th Infantry Training and Formation (French: Instruction en formation de l'infanterie 18), in Colombier
  - 19th Military Police School (French: Ecole police militaire 19), in Sion
  - Armed Forces Mountain Service Competence Centre (German: Kompetenzzentrum Gebirgsdienst der Armee), in Andermatt
    - 15th Mountain Specialists School (German: Gebirgsspezialisten Schule 15)
    - 1st Mountain Specialists Group (German: Gebirgsspezialistenabteilung 1)
    - 104th/204th Mountain Specialists Readiness Detachment (German: Gebirgsspezialisten Bereitschaftsdetachement 104/204)
  - Military Music Competence Centre (German: Kompetenzzentrum Militärmusik), in Bern
    - Command and Training, in Aarau
    - Swiss Military Bands with 4x professional orchestras: the Central Band, Brass Band, Big Band and Symphony Wind Orchestra
    - 11x Military bands with conscript recruits

==== Panzer and Artillery Training Unit ====
The Panzer and Artillery Training Unit (German: Lehrverband Panzer und Artillerie) trains the armed forces' armoured and artillery troops, and the troops of the territorial divisions' staff battalions.

- **Panzer and Artillery Training Unit**, in Thun
  - 21st Panzer School (German: Panzerschule 21), in Thun
  - 22nd Panzer/Artillery Officers School (German: Panzer/Artillerie Offiziersschule 22), in Thun
  - 31st Artillery and Reconnaissance School (French: Ecole d'artillerie et d'exploration 31), in Bière
  - Thun Weapons Range/ Mechanised Training Centre (German: Waffenplatz Thun/ Mechanisiertes Ausbildungszentrum), in Thun
  - Bière Weapons Range/ Artillery Training Centre (French: Place d'armes de Bière / Centre d'Instruction de l'Artillerie), in Bière
    - Simplon Artillery Shooting Range (German: Artillerieschiessplatz Simplon, at the Simplon Pass
  - 2nd Trials/ Unit Training (German: Versuche/Verbandsausbildung 2), in Thun manages the development, procurement and field trials of armoured and artillery equipment

==== Engineer/ Civil Protection/ NBC Training Unit ====
The Engineer/ Civil Protection/ NBC Training Unit (German: Lehrverband Genie/Rettung/ABC) trains the armed forces' engineer, civil protection, CBRN defense, disaster relief, and demining troops. The unit is also responsible for the Swiss Armed Forces naval troops and divers, and the armed forces athletes and sport training.

- **Engineer/ Civil Protection/ NBC Training Unit**, in Zuchwil
  - 73rd Engineer School (German: Genieschule 73), in Brugg
  - 74th Engineer/Civil Protection Seminars+Courses (German: Genie/Rettung Lehrgänge+Kurse 74), in Bremgarten trains non-commissioned officers and officers
    - Armed Forces Divers Centre (German: Zentrum Armeetaucher)
  - 75th Civil Protection School (German: Rettungsschule 75), in Wangen an der Aare
  - 76th Civil Protection Troops Training Centre (French: Centre d'instruction des troupes de sauvetage 76, German: Ausbildungszentrum der Rettungstruppen 76), in Bernex
    - Geneva Weapons Range (French: Place d'armes de Genève), in Geneva
  - Disaster Relief Readiness Battalion (German: Katastrophenhilfe Bereitschaftsbataillon), in Bremgarten deployable within hours for national and international disaster relief
  - NBC Defense-Explosive Ordnance Disposal and Mine Clearance Competence Centre (German: Kompetenzzentrum ABC-KAMIR), in Spiez
    - 77th NBC Defense School (German: ABC-Abwehr Schule 77), in Spiez
    - 1st NBC Defense Laboratory (German: ABC Abwehrlabor 1), in Spiez
    - 10th NBC Defense Battalion (German: ABC Abwehrbataillon 10), in Luzern
    - NBC Defense Readiness Company(German: ABC Abwehr-Einsatzkompanie), in Spiez
    - Ordnance Disposal and Mine Clearance Command (German: Kommando Kampfmittelbeseitigung und Minenräumung (KAMIR), in Spiez
      - Unexploded Ordnance Reporting Centre (German: Blindgängermeldezentrale), in Spiez
  - Armed Forces Sport Competence Centre (German: Kompetenzzentrum Sport Armee), in Magglingen
  - 10th Motor Boat Company (German: Motorbootkompanie 10), in Zuchwil patrolling the Swiss border lakes

==== Command Support Training Unit ====
The Command Support Training Unit (German: Lehrverband Führungsunterstützung) trains the armed forces' signal, electronic warfare, and command support troops.

- **Command Support Training Unit**, at Dübendorf Air Base
  - 30th Command Support Officers School (German: Führungsunterstützung Offiziersschule 30), in Bülach
  - 61st Information Technology School (German: Informatikschule 61), in Frauenfeld
  - 62nd Signal School (German: Richtstrahlschule 62), in Kloten
  - 63rd Command Support School (German: Führungsunterstützung Schule 63), in Bülach
  - 64th Electronic Warfare School (German: Elektronische Kriegführung- Schule 64), in Thun
  - Frauenfeld Weapons Range (German: Waffenplatz Frauenfeld), in Frauenfeld
  - Kloten-Bülach Weapons Range (German: Waffenplatz Kloten-Bülach), in Kloten and Bülach

==== Logistic Training Unit ====
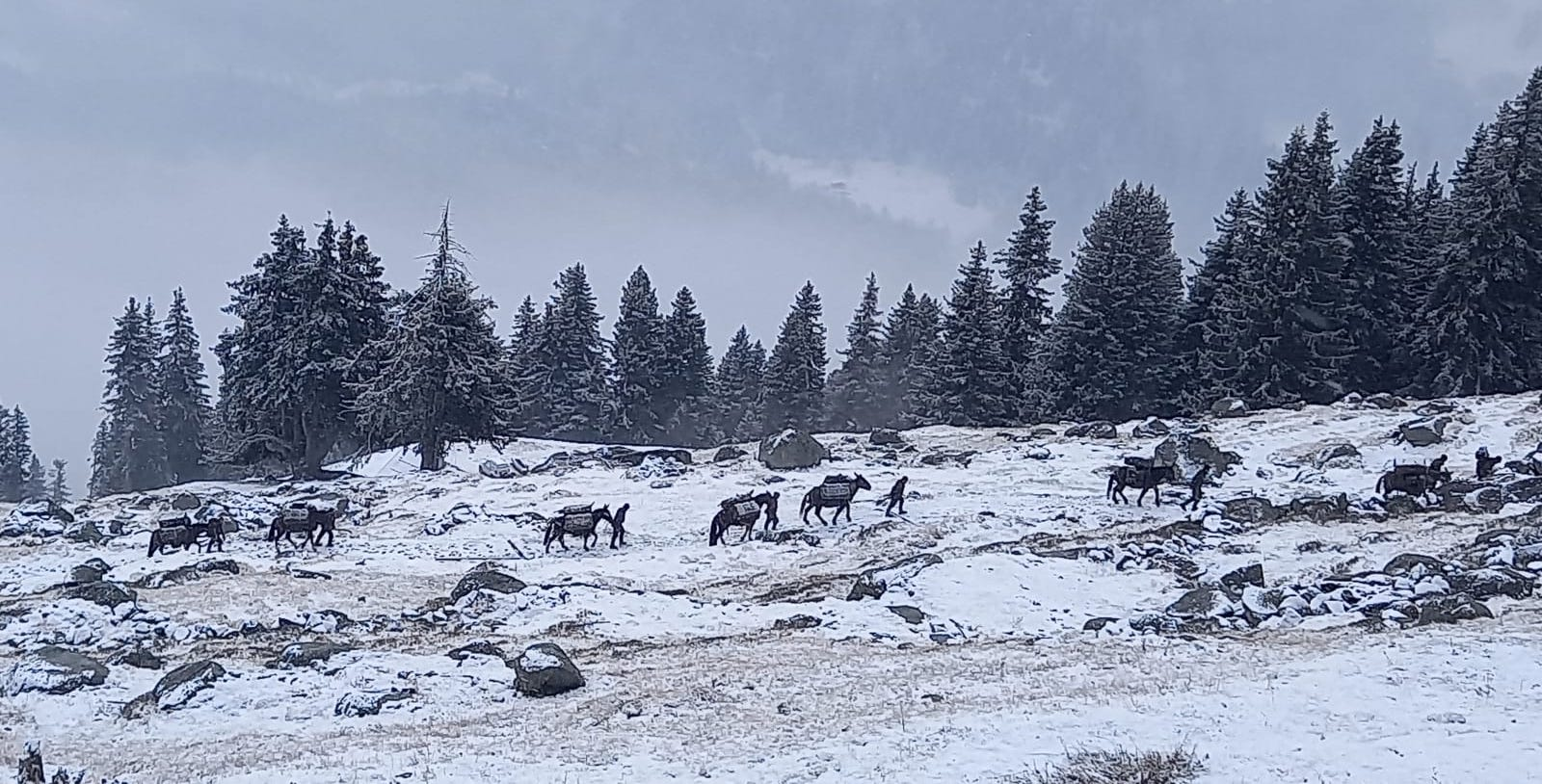
Groupe vétérinaire et animaux de l’armée 13 train column above Disentis

The Logistic Training Unit trains (German: Lehrverband Logistik) the armed forces' medical, logistics, movement control, transport, maintenance, and veterinary troops, and the armed forces' animals.

- **Logistic Training Unit**, in Thun
  - 40th Logistic Officers School (German: Logistik Offiziersschule 40), in Bern
  - 41st Hospital School (French: Ecole hôpital 41), at the Moudon Weapons Range
  - 41st Military Doctors Non-Commissioned Officers/Officers School (French: École de sous-officiers/École d’officiers des médecins militaires 41), at the Moudon Weapons Range
  - 42nd Medical School (Italian: Scuola sanitaria 42), in Airolo
  - 43rd Maintenance School (German: Instandhaltungsschule 43), in Thun
  - 45th Supply School (French: Ecole ravitaillement 45), in Romont
  - 47th Movement Control and Transport School (French: Ecole circulation et transport 47), in Romont
  - 49th Higher Non-commissioned Officer Courses (German: Höhere Unteroffizierslehrgänge 49), in Bern
  - Catering Training Centre (German: Ausbildungszentrum Verpflegung), in Thun
    - Swiss Armed Forces Culinary Team
  - Veterinary Service and Armed Forces Animals Competence Centre (German: Kompetenzzentrum Veterinärdienst und Armeetiere), in Bern
    - 13th Veterinary and Armed Forces Animals Group (French: Groupe vétérinaire et animaux de l’armée 13), in Schönbühl
      - 3x Train Columns (French: Colonnes de train 13/1, 13/2, 13/3), with around 100 horses each
      - Veterinary Company (French: Compagnie vétérinaire 13/4)
      - Dog Handler Company (French: Compagnie de conducteurs de chiens 13/5), with around 100 dogs
  - Armed Forces Driving Training Competence Centre (German: Kompetenzzentrum Fahrausbildung Armee), in Thun

==== Armed Forces Training Centre ====
The Armed Forces Training Centre (German: Ausbildungszentrum der Armee) is responsible for the initial and continuing education of the armed forces' professional personnel, combat exercises with simulation support, and safety-related matters on all shooting ranges.

- **Armed Forces Training Centre**, in Walenstadt
  - Seminars and Courses Command (German: Kommando Lehrgänge und Kurse), in Walenstadt
  - Combat Training Centre Command West (French: Commandement centre d'instruction de combat Ouest), in Bure
    - Bure Weapons Range (French: Place d’armes de Bure), in Bure
  - Combat Training Centre Command East (German: Kommando Gefechtsausbildungszentrum Ost), in Walenstadt
    - Walenstadt Weapons Range (German: Waffenplatz Walenstadt), in Walenstadt
    - St. Luzisteig Shooting Range (German: Schiessplatz St. Luzisteig, in Maienfeld
  - Hinterrhein Shooting Range (German: Schiessplatz St. Luzisteig, in Hinterrhein
  - Wichlen Shooting Range (German: Schiessplatz St. Luzisteig, in Elm
  - Trials and Development Office (German: Bereich Versuche und Entwicklung), in Walenstadt manages the development, procurement and field trials of infantry equipment and gear

=== Cyber Command ===
The Cyber Command (German: Kommando Cyber) operates the Swiss military's information and communications network and the electronic operations centres.

- **Cyber Command**, in Bern
  - Cyber Security Centre, protects the information and communications network
  - Mission Control Centre, monitors and steers the information and communications network
  - Electronic Operations Centre (German: Zentrum Elektronische Operationen), operates the Signals Intelligence and Electronic Warfare network

==== 41st Command Support Brigade ====
The 41st Command Support Brigade (German: Führungsunterstützungsbrigade 41) is the military part of the Command Support Organisation and supports the operational units of the Armed Forces.

- **41st Command Support Brigade**, in Bülach
  - Systems/Cadre Training/Support Command (German: Kommando Systeme/Kaderausbildung/Support)
  - 41st Command Support Battalion (German: Führungsunterstützungbataillon 41)
  - 11th Headquarters Battalion (German: HQ Bataillon 11)
  - 22nd Headquarters Battalion (German: HQ Bataillon 22)
  - 25th Headquarters Battalion (German: HQ Bataillon 25)
  - 4th Signal Battalion (German: Richtstrahlbataillon 4), supporting the Air Force
  - 16th Signal Battalion (French: Bataillon d’ondes dirigées 16)
  - 17th Signal Battalion (German: Richtstrahlbataillon 17)
  - 21st Signal Battalion (German: Richtstrahlbataillon 21)
  - 32nd Signal Battalion (German: Richtstrahlbataillon 32)
  - 46th Electronic Group (German: Elektronikabteilung 46), radio reconnaissance
  - 51st Electronic Warfare Group (French: Groupe guerre électronique 51)
  - 52nd Electronic Warfare Group (German: Elektronische Kriegführung Abteilung 52)

The battalions of the 41st Command Support Brigade field the following subunits:

- Headquarters battalions:
  - Staff company, operations company, signal company, protection company, transport company
- Command support battalion:
  - Staff company, 3x command support companies, protection company
- Signal battalions:
  - Staff company, 4x signal companies
- Electronic warfare groups:
  - Staff company, 2x electronic warfare companies

=== Armed Forces Logistics Organisation ===
The Armed Forces Logistics Organisation (German: Logistikbasis der Armee) prepares and maintains the materiel and infrastructures of the Swiss Armed Forces. The Logistics Organisation's areas not assigned to the 1st Logistic Brigade are manned and managed by civilian staff.

- **Armed Forces Logistics Organisation**, in Bern
  - Armed Forces Logistic Centre Othmarsingen (German: Armeelogistikcenter Othmarsingen)
  - Armed Forces Logistic Centre Hinwil (German: Armeelogistikcenter Hinwil)
  - Armed Forces Logistic Centre Thun (German: Armeelogistikcenter Thun)
  - Armed Forces Logistic Centre Monteceneri (Italian: Centro Logistico dell'Esercito Monteceneri)
  - Armed Forces Logistic Centre Grolley (French: Centre logistique de l'armée Grolley)
  - Electronic Media Centre, in Bern (German: Zentrum elektronische Medien, French: Centre des médias électroniques, Italian: Centro dei media elettronici)
  - Armed Forces Road Traffic and Naval Shipping Office, in Bern (German: Strassenverkehrs- und Schifffahrtsamt der Armee

==== 1st Logistic Brigade ====
The 1st Logistic Brigade (German: Logistikbrigade 1) is the military part of the Logistics Organisation and supports the operational units of the Armed Forces.

- **1st Logistic Brigade**, in Ittigen
  - 1st Logistic Brigade Staff Company (German: Logistikbrigade Stabskompanie 1)
  - 1st Movement Control and Transport Battalion (German: Verkehrs und Transportbataillon 1)
  - 1st Infrastructure Battalion (German: Infrastrukturbataillon 1), operates underground command centres and protects above-ground headquarters
  - 21st Logistic Battalion (French: Bataillon de la logistique 21)
  - 51st Logistic Battalion (German: Logistikbataillon 51)
  - 52nd Logistic Battalion (German: Logistikbataillon 52)
  - 92nd Logistic Battalion (German: Logistikbataillon 92)
  - 101st Logistic Battalion (German: Logistikbataillon 101)
  - 61st Logistic Support Battalion (German: Logistiksupportbataillon 61)
  - 2nd Hospital Battalion (French: Bataillon hôpital 2)
  - 5th Hospital Battalion (German: Spitalbataillon 5)
  - 66th Hospital Battalion (German: Spitalbataillon 66)
  - 75th Hospital Battalion (German: Spitalbataillon 75)
  - 81st Medical Logistics Battalion (German: Sanitätslogistikbataillon 81)
  - 9th Medical Support Battalion (German: Sanitätssupportbataillon 9)
  - 104th/204th Logistic Readiness Company (German: Logistikbereitschaftskompanie 104/204)

The battalions of the 1st Logistic Brigade field the following subunits:

- Movement control and transport battalion:
  - Staff company, 3x movement control companies, 3x transport companies
- Logistic battalions:
  - Staff company, 2x logistic companies (the battalions will add a third logistic company in 2021 and a fourth logistic company in 2023)
- Hospital battalions:
  - Staff company, 2x hospital companies
- Medical logistics battalion:
  - Staff company, 3x medical logistics companies

== Armed Forces Organization Graphic ==
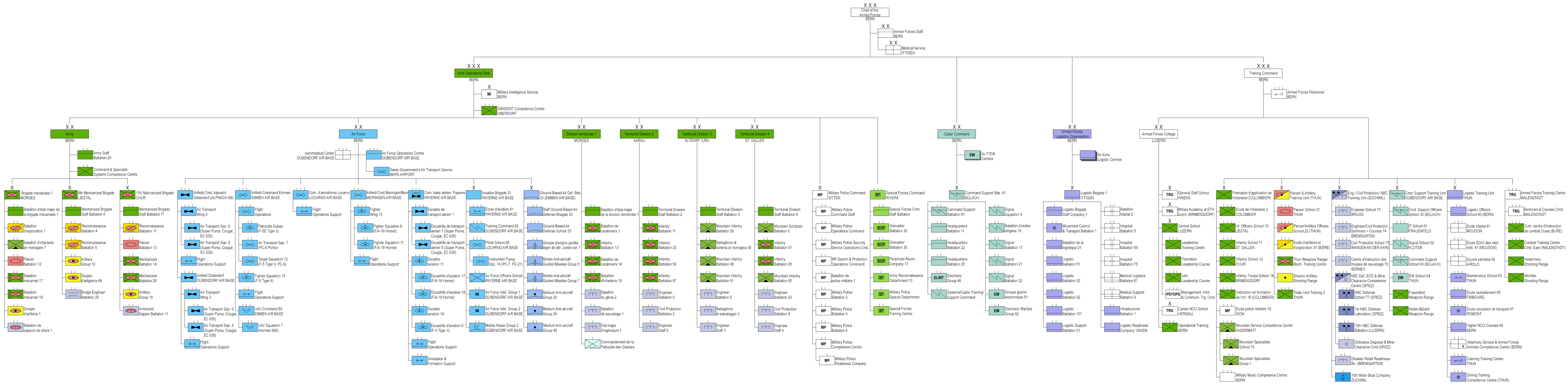
Swiss Armed Forces organization 2025 (click to enlarge)
