= Militär-Helikopter-Rettungsdienst =

Militär-Helikopter-Rettungsdienst (MHR) French Service de sauvetage militaire héliporté (SMH)
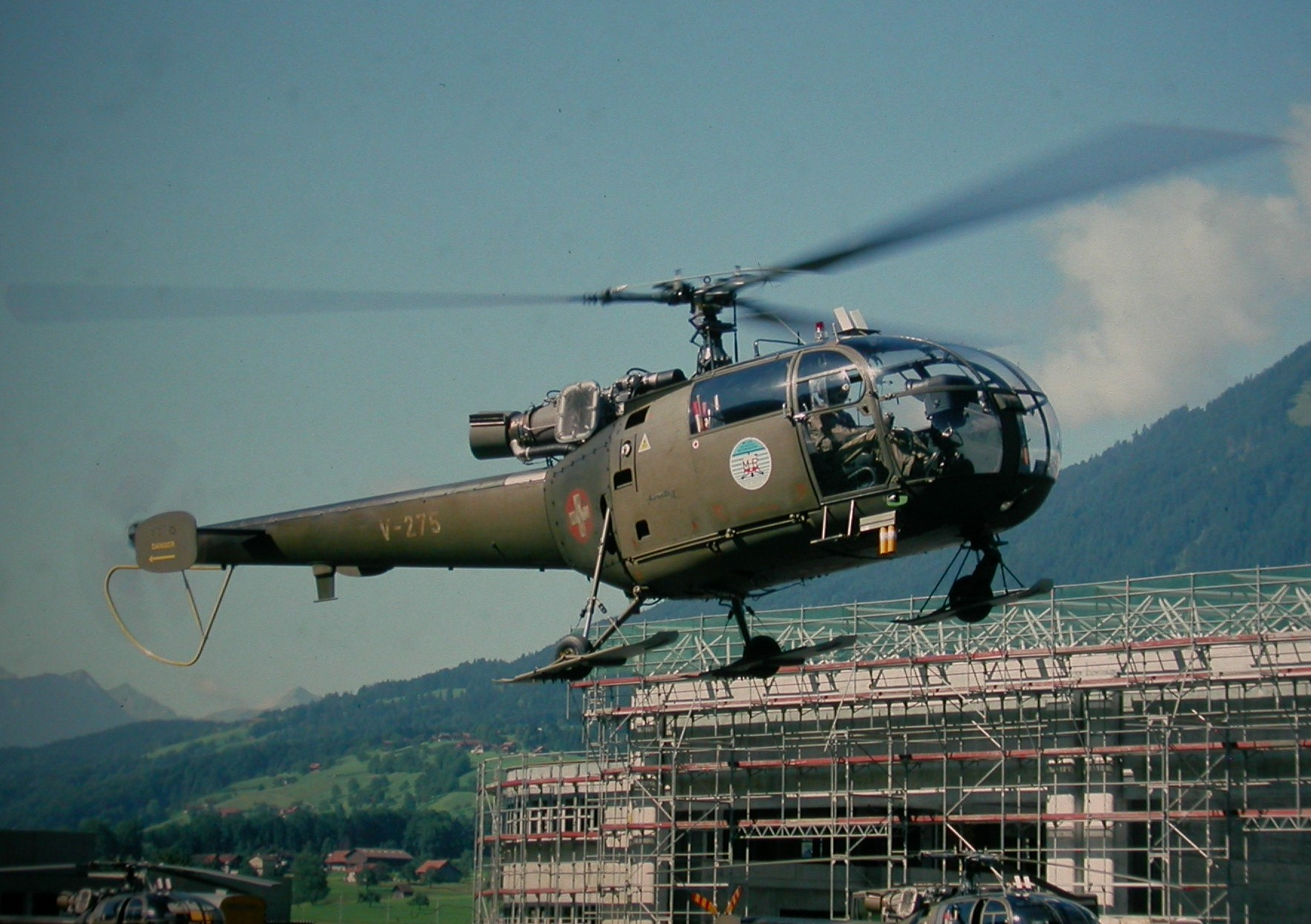
- Swiss Air Force Alouette III with MHR emblem
- Active: 1960-1990s
- Country: Switzerland
- Branch: Swiss Air Force
- Role: SAR
- Garrison/HQ: Dübendorf Air Base

The Militär-Helikopter-Rettungsdienst (MHR) (French Service de sauvetage militaire héliporté SMH) was a helicopter unit of the Swiss Air Force, and belonged to the Überwachungsgeschwader. It had professional military pilots and militia part-time pilots. Its main task was to provide air medical services for the Swiss military. At the time of its dissolution the MHR was based at Dübendorf Air Base.

== History ==
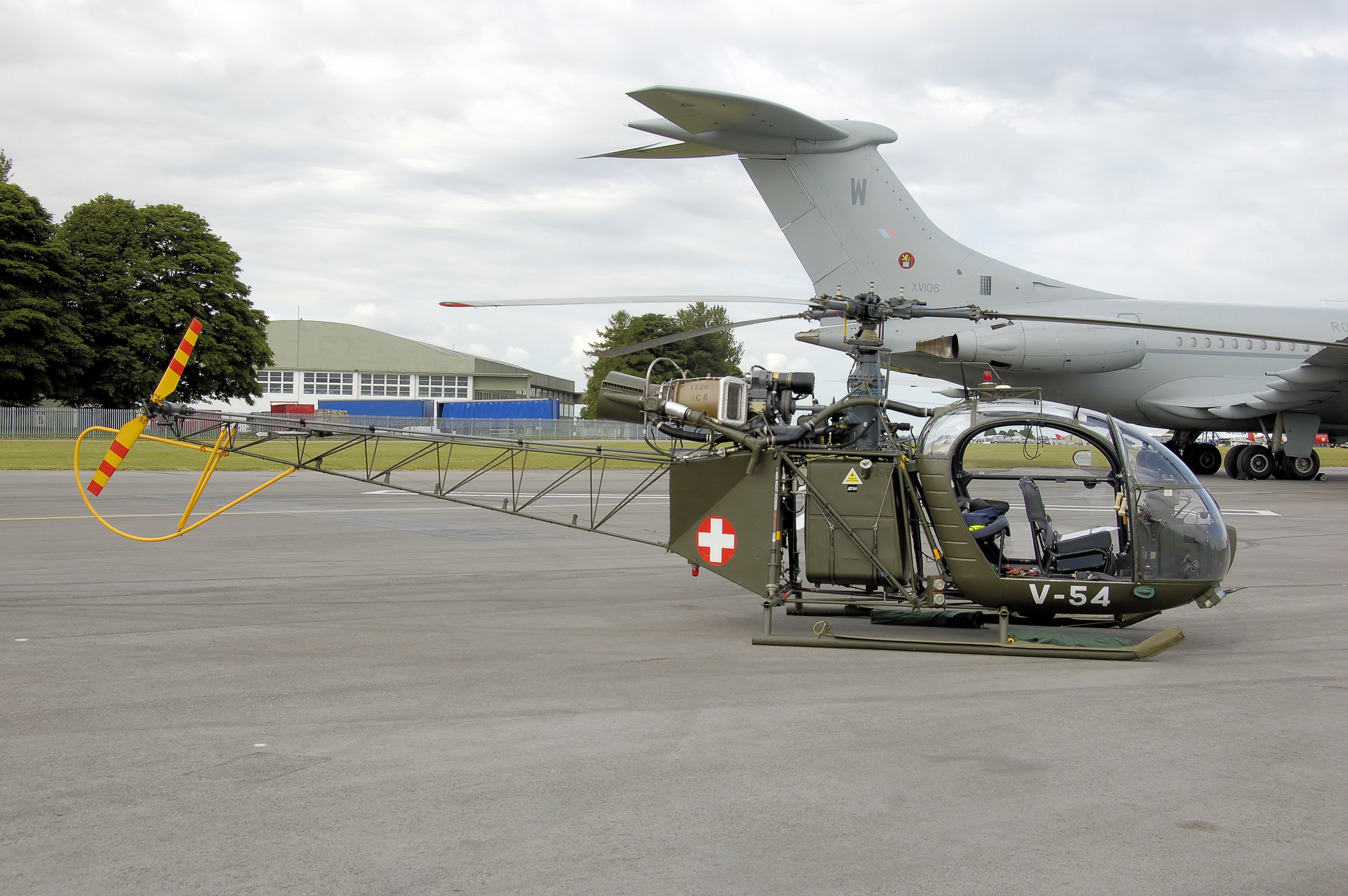
Alouette II

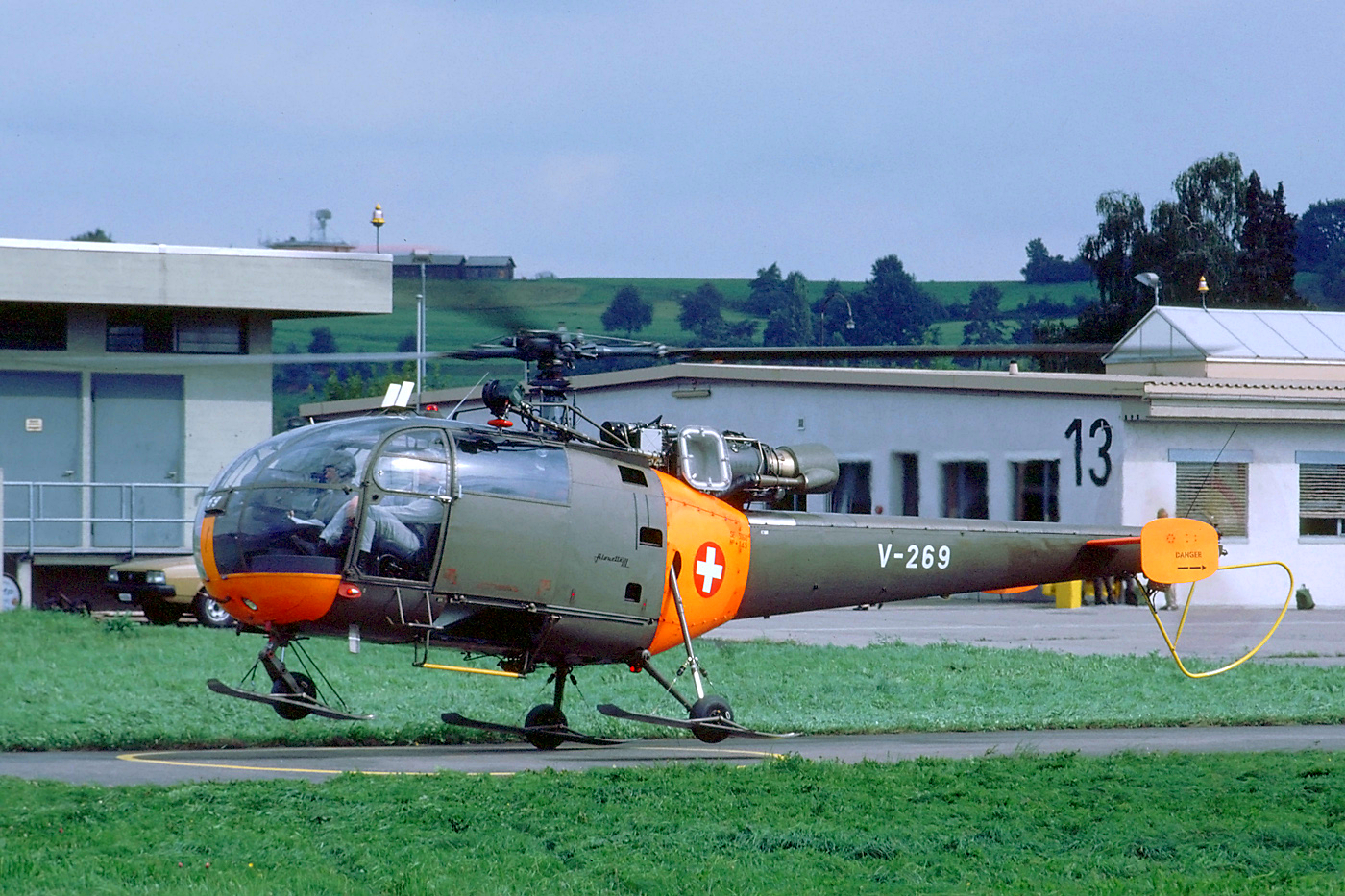
Alouette III

In the federalism system of Switzerland, rescue services are not within the scope of the Confederation, but are the responsibility of the cantons, municipalities and cities. This prevented the creation of an air-rescue organization on a national base. It was not possible for the smaller cantons to build up their own air rescue services. This led to the creation of the civilian organization REGA. The REGA is financed by membership fees only. The Swiss military also recognized the benefits of air rescue shortly after the introduction of helicopters into its service in 1952. The creation and organization of the rescue service by means of military helicopters dates back to the year 1960. This was probably due to the ejection seat rescue of Wachtmeister Tresoldi in July 1960 over the Blinnental in the canton of Valais.

As a result, material depots for helicopter rescue operations were created on 13 airfields and a proving ground (Andermatt) and an instructions sheet for rescue pilots was created. However, fuel reserves for the use of helicopters in emergencies were already provided in 1959 at eight airfields and the proving ground in Andermatt, which may be described as the forerunner of today's rescue organization. In individual cases, these were used as a means of rescue. One of the first such missions was a failed rescue mission on 13 January 1954 using a Hiller UH-12, on the occasion of an avalanche accident at St. Antönien, the failure due to the lack of experience of the pilot. Since 1960, the Swiss Air Force had a permanent rescue organization with specially equipped helicopters during working hours.

On the basis of the now confirmed advantages of air rescue, the Militär-Helikopter-Rettungsdienst was founded by the Swiss Air Force on 1 December 1965. The Militär-Helikopter-Rettungsdienst was continuously ready for emergency rescue operations from dawn until dusk, starting in July 1966. This service was responsible for air rescue within the Swiss military, but also for other organizations that were part of the then EMD and today's DDPS (German: VBS), such as the Youth and Sport (German : Jugend + Sport, J + S). The Militär-Helikopter-Rettungsdienst was alerted by telephone.

The MHR did not exist as a fixed unit. The pilots and helicopters always belonged to various air transport squadrons such as the Lufttransport Staffel 5. Alouette III helicopters were used, which were equipped with rope or rescue winches (the rope winches were mountable on all Alouette IIIs of the Swiss Air Force).

The MHT was dissolved towards the end of the 1990s and the task was taken over by REGA. However, the service for rescues which had not been directly connected with the military (e.g. for Scouts organizations) had already been handed over to the REGA before. Military air rescue operations continue with the Air Rescue Service of the Army (LRA) with its helicopters in support of the REGA. In the late 1990s, the LRA emerged from the former MHR. With the transfer of MHR to the LRA, the service has been greatly reduced and serves only to maintain competence.

- From 1960, 1961 and 1962 there are no statistical data on the use of military helicopters for rescue operations. In the years 1961 and 1962 the MHR, under the pressure of austerity measures was already very restricted.
- 1963: Only rescue operations of military personnel were carried out. The following were transported: 6 injured, 3 sick, 1 avalanche spill. Flight services: 24 h 30 min / 104 flights.
- 1964: 12 rescues were flown with helicopters. Transports were: 9 injured, 1 sick, 2 dead. Flight services 7 h 30 min.
- 1965: Military actions 17: Rescue injured 24, injured or sick 20, dead 1, flight: 23 h 06 min.
- 1965: Civilian Actions 10: Rescue Uninjured 9, Injured or Ill 1, Dead 7; Search actions 5; Flight: 23 hrs. 53 min.

In 1965, the MHR carried about 60 people, about one third of whom were civilians, with a deployment of approximately 50 flight hours. The MHR was working in close contact with the REGA, but stayed back, in order not to restrict their employment possibilities. Transports of civilians was charged, in order not to compete with the REGA.

- 1966: (January 1 to June 30)
  - Military actions 4; Rescue Uninjured 56, Sick 4, Rescue injured 5, = 65; Flight services 7 hrs. 10 min.
  - Civil Actions 2 (Air Glacier / Zanfleuron, Kaggia-Weik / Stollenbruch); Rescues Uninjured 42nd flight for this: 3 hours 34 minutes plus 2 deployments in favor of civilian from 3.7.66

== Locations ==
As a rule, the military bases of the Militär-Helikopter-Rettungsdienst was alternately the Dübendorf Air Base and Alpnach Air Base, in exceptional cases Sion Airport or Ambri Airport.

== Bibliography ==
- Militär-Helikopter-Rettungsdienst im Bundesarchiv
- Romano Cotti, Herbert Oberholzer: Kennen + Können. Rex-Verlag, Luzern / Stuttgart.
