= Fanny Chollet =

Swiss pilot (born 1991)

- Born: 1991 (age 34–35); Saint-Légier-La Chiésaz, Switzerland
- Military career
- Allegiance: Switzerland
- Branch: Swiss Air Force
- Service years: 2012–present
- Rank: Captain
- Nickname: "Shotty"

Fanny "Shotty" Chollet (born 1991 in Saint-Légier-La Chiésaz) is the first woman in Switzerland to fly a jet fighter plane, the F/A-18. She is a career officer in the Swiss Air Force and currently holds the rank of Captain.

== Career ==
Fanny "Shotty" Chollet graduated from Pully High School with a baccalaureate in biology and chemistry. She performed her military service in the aviation troops at the military airfields Payerne, Dübendorf and Alpnach. In 2012, Chollet was selected as a military pilot for the Swiss Air Force and joined Pilot Class 11 in the Swiss Air Force Pilot School in Emmen. She completed the first part of her education by earning a civilian commercial pilot license with instrument rating (CPL/IR) and airline transport pilot license theory (frozen ATPL) from Swiss Aviation Training (SAT, now Lufthansa Aviation Training) and a Bachelor of Science in Aviation from the Zurich University of Applied Sciences (ZHAW) in Winterthur. This was followed by one-year stints on the PC-7 and the PC-21. She is the first woman to fly the Pilatus PC-21. In December 2017, she received her military pilot's license.

In early 2018, she began her F/A-18 training in the simulator and with F/A-18D double-seaters. On March 18, she completed her first solo flight in an F/A-18C (single-seater). She is assigned to the Fliegerstaffel 18 squadron in Payerne. She is fluent in French, English, German, and Swiss German.

Chollet is a member of the Appa (L'Andociation pour la Promotion du Patrimoine Aéronautique). In addition, she campaigned in 2020 as an ambassador for the “Swiss Tecladies” program. She was committed to the campaign for the procurement of new combat aircraft.

== Aircraft types ==
- Pilatus PC-7
- Pilatus PC-21
- F/A-18C
- F/A-18D

== Weblinks Single references ==
- Fanny Chollet on Public Q&A with Commander of the Swiss Air Force Bernhard Müller. (French language text)
- Aargauer Zeitung
- Schweizer Armee braucht Frauen wie Fanny Chollet Die Erste ihrer Art: «Shotty» wusste schon im Gymi, dass sie Kampfjetpilotin werden will
- Fanny Chollet: Die erste Frau in einem F/A-18-Cockpit
- TV News Report "Tagesschau" Waadtländerin fliegt F/A-18
- defensio.1-2019 (April 2019) "Mit Überschall am helevtischen Himmel (With supersonic in to the helevetic sky). Page 10 - 15
- "Erste Schweizer F/A-18 Pilotin" Schweizer Soldat, April 2019 Page 18 & 19 ISSN 1424-3482
- Schweizer Luftwaffe Jahrespublikation 2020 (Swiss Air Force annual publishing) Frontcover & Pages 7–11. December 2019 ISBN 978-3-9524427-6-0
