= Fliegerstaffel 18 =

Fliegerstaffel 18 18ème Escadrille Squadriglia d'aviazione 18
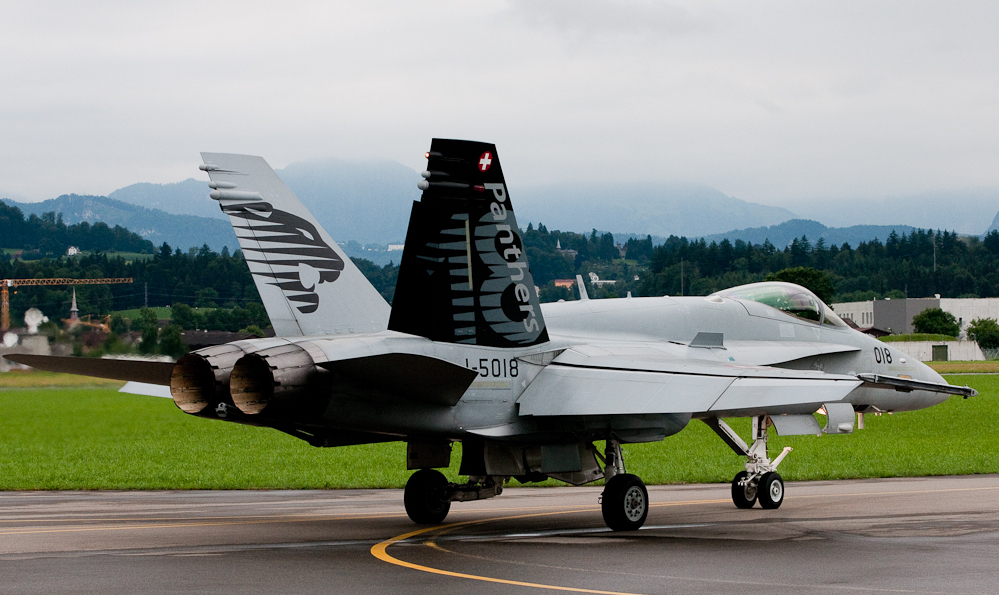
- F/A-18C J-5018 Panthers Fliegerstaffel 18
- Active: 1925-today
- Country: Switzerland
- Branch: Swiss Air Force
- Role: Fighter squadron
- Garrison/HQ: Payerne Air Base

Fliegerstaffel 18 (18 Squadron) «Panthers» of the Swiss Air Force is a Berufsfliegerkorps squadron equipped with McDonnell Douglas F/A-18 and forms Fliegergeschwader 14 together with Fliegerstaffel 19. The home base of the Fliegerstaffel 18 is Payerne Air Base. The Fliegerstaffel 18 carries a Black Panther against a green backdrop as its coat of arms.

== History ==
The establishment of the Fliegerkompanie 18 took place in 1925. From 1928 to 1941, it used the Dewoitine D-27. From 1941 to 1949, flight operations were done with Morane D-3800. In 1945, the Fliegerkompanie 18 was 1945 renamed Fliegerstaffel 18. From 1949 to 1956, the Fliegerstaffel 18 was equipped with P-51 Mustang. The jet-aircraft De Havilland D.H. 112 Venom was used at the Fliegerstaffel 18 from 1957 to 1973. From 1973 to 1975, The Fliegerstaffel 18 used the Hawker Hunter with the Alpnach Air Base as homebase. Since 1975, the Payerne Air Base is the new home base of the Fliegerstaffel 18.

From 1978 to 1997, the Fliegerstaffel 18 used the F-5 Tiger from Payerne. As second squadron (after Fliegerstaffel 17), the Fliegerstaffel 18 introduced the F/A-18 Hornet. At the end of 2005, the Überwachungsgeschwader was disbanded and the staff, and thus also the Fliegerstaffel 18, were transferred to the Berufsfliegerkorps. In 2010, the F/A-18C with the tailnumber J-50 18 received a permanent squadron painting and is the squadron aircraft of the Fliegerstaffel 18.

In normal flight operation the J-5018 is given priority to the squadron commander of Fliegerstaffel 18, but is also flown by other pilots. If the current F/A-18 Hornet Solo Display pilot is from the Fliegerstaffel 18, he will fly the J-5018, if possible. The Fliegerstaffel 18 usually operates with the Fliegergeschwader 11 (Fl Geschw 11) from the Payerne Air Base. Tactically, however, the Fliegerstaffel 18 belongs together with the Fliegerstaffel 19 to the Fliegergeschwader 14 (Fl Geschw 14), which belongs to the airfield command 14 (Flpl Kdo 14) and is stationed on the Sion Airport.

Although the NATO Tigermeet is reserved for the squadrons with a tiger emblem, the Fliegerstaffel 18 was invited as a guest due to the fact that they have a “cat” as a squadron emblem.

The Armasuisse, Oberstleutnant Bernhard Berset is in its military duty F/A-18 pilot in the Fliegerstaffel 18. The first female fighter jet pilots of the Swiss Air Force Fanny Chollet is also a member of the squadron.

== Aircraft ==
- Dewoitine D.27
- Morane D-3800
- North American P-51 Mustang
- de Havilland D.H.112 Venom
- Hawker Hunter
- Northrop F-5
- F/A-18
