= Bernhard Müller (general) =

Swiss military officer

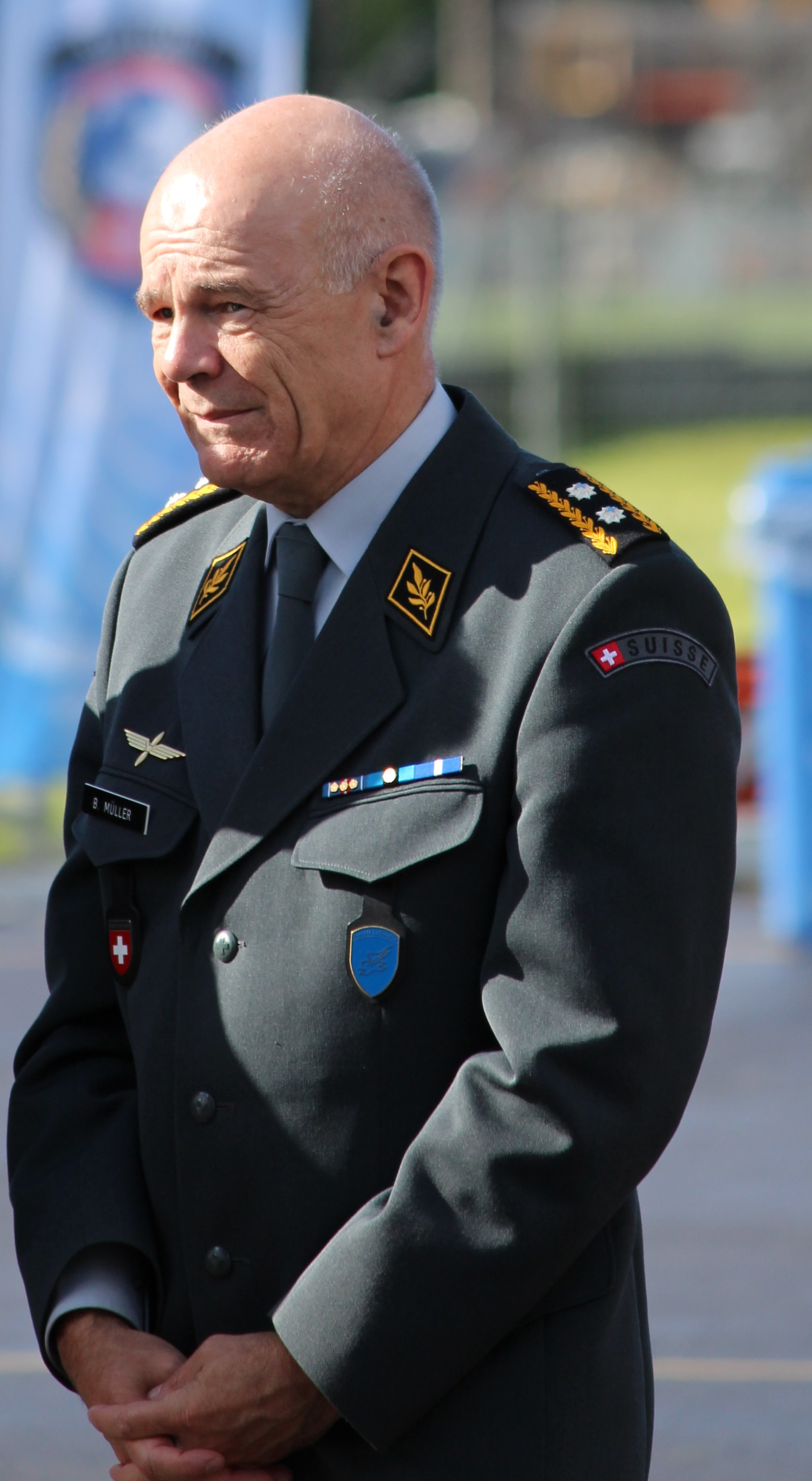
- Div Bernhard Müller (2017)
- Born: 9 March 1957 (age 69); Switzerland
- Military career
- Allegiance: Switzerland
- Branch: Swiss Air Force
- Service years: present
- Rank: Divisional general German: Divisionär NATO-Code: OF-7.
- Commands: Deputy Commander of the Swiss Air Force

Bernhard Müller (born 9 March 1957) is as a Swiss military official. He was the Commander of the Swiss Air Force.

== Early life ==
Müller grew up in the town of Wettingen in the canton of Aargau. He attended the teacher's seminar. there, Later he graduated from the University of Zurich.

== Career ==
In 1987, he became a chief flight instructor at the introduction of the Super Pumas in the Swiss Air Force. After various positions as an officer in the Swiss Air Force, he became Chief of the Swiss Air Force Operations and Deputy Commander of the Luftwaffe on April 1, 2009. The Swiss Federal Council promoted Müller to commander of the Swiss Air Force on March 22, 2017. He succeeds Aldo C. Schellenberg starting January 1, 2018 until 30. Jun 2021.

Since 2009, Müller has been a member of the Board of Directors of the Swiss air traffic control agency Skyguide. From 2009 to 2021, Müller was a member of the Board of Directors of Swiss Air Security Skyguide.

=== Positions ===
As a militia officer, Müller :

- 2001-2003: Commander Alpnach Air Base (ad hoc)
- 2000-2002: Chief of Staff Air Brigade 31
- 1993-1999: General Staff Officer Airborne Brigade 31
- 1989-1992: Commander Lufttransport Staffel 6

Müller was a chief instructor during the introduction of the Eurocopter AS332 Super Puma. Among other things, he directed humanitarian helicopter missions for the Swiss Army in Albania and Sumatra as well as firefighting missions in Greece.

== Decorations and awards ==
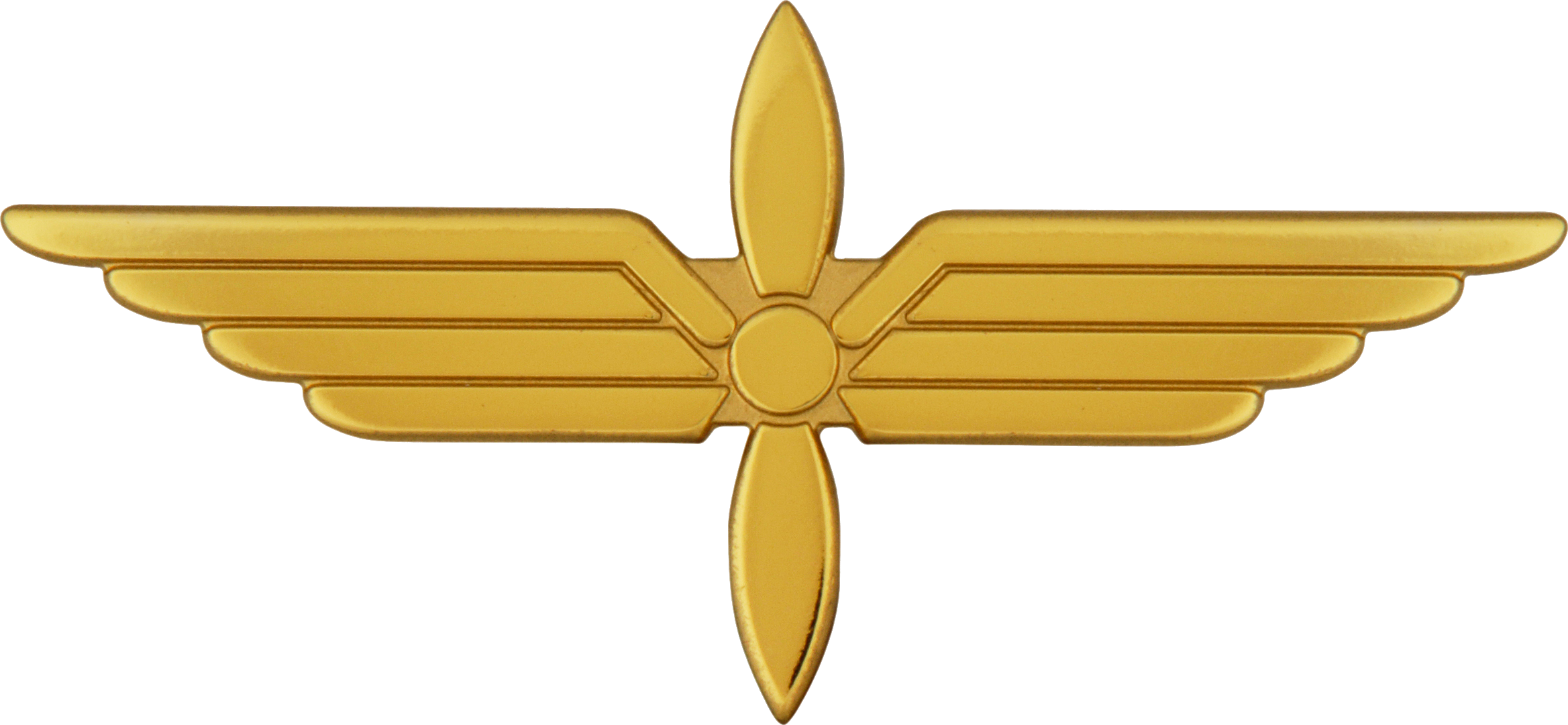

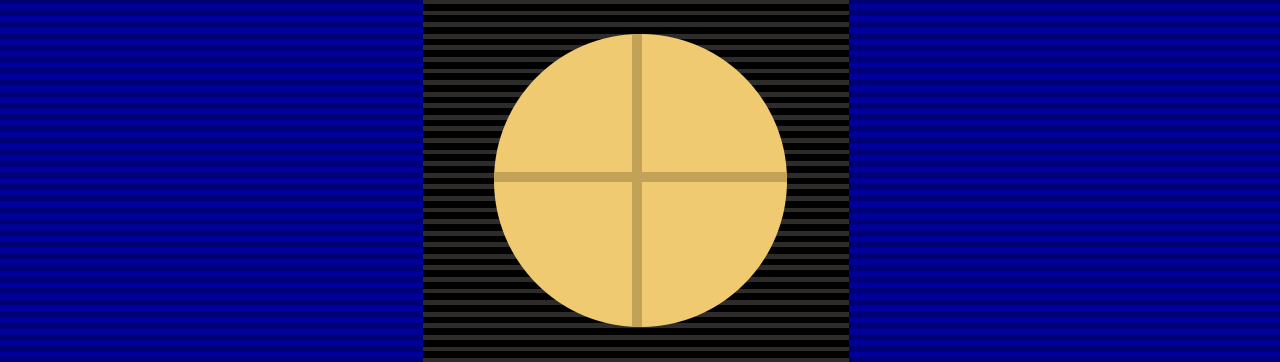

Pilot Abzeichen
Length of Service Decoration with three golden rosettes	Military Assault rifle level 1	UN / OSCE Mandat
