= Lufttransport Staffel 6 =

Lufttransport Staffel 6 Escadrille Transport Aérien 6
- Active: 1960s - today
- Country: Switzerland
- Branch: Swiss Air Force
- Role: transport squadron
- Garrison/HQ: Alpnach Air Base

The Lufttransport Staffel 6 (LT St6 or LT 6) is a transport squadron of the Swiss Air Force. The pilots associated with it are part of the Berufsfliegerkorps. A third of the pilots are militia pilots employed by civilian employers. The Lufttransport Staffel 6 together with the Lufttransport Staffel 8 is part of the Lufttransport Geschwader 2, which belongs to the Flugplatzkommando 2 (airfield command 2) at Alpnach Air Base.

Lufttransport Staffel 6 carries as coat of arms an oval badge with the front view of a black fly on a white ground, above and below a red area. The abbreviation "LT" stands at the top in the red area, the number 6 is at the bottom. The camouflage version of the coat of arms shows the same image, but in dark green shades instead of white and red.

== History ==
The expansion of the helicopter fleet in the Swiss Air Force started in the early 1960s. This led to the formation of Lufttransport Staffel 8 and Lufttransport Staffel 6. Lufttransport Staffel 6 is equipped with 15 Alouette III helicopters. It completed its first retraining course from October through November 1967. The Lufttransport Staffel 6 used the Alouette III helicopters until 2010. According to today's Lufttransport Staffel 6 and the groundcrew organization, the separation of the groundcrew and air component originated in 1974. In 1992, Lufttransport Staffel 6 introduced the AS332M1 Super Puma, and in 2001 it introduced the AS532UL Cougar helicopters. Since 2010, Lufttransport Staffel 6 has also used the Eurocopter EC635. The former commander of Lufttransportstaffel 6, Bernhard Müller, is scheduled to become the new commander of the Swiss Air Force on 1 January 2018 .

Lufttransport Staffel 6 is tasked with helicopter air transport throughout Switzerland.

== Aircraft ==
- Alouette III
- AS332M1 Super Puma
- AS532UL Cougar
- Eurocopter EC635
