= Lufttransport Staffel 8 =

Lufttransport Staffel 8 Escadrille Transport Aérien 8
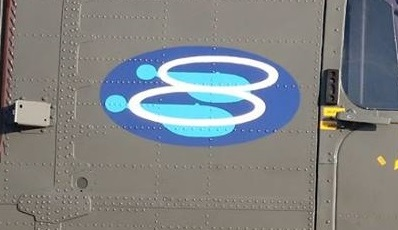
- squadron emblem Lufttransport Staffel 8
- Active: 1960s - today
- Country: Switzerland
- Branch: Swiss Air Force
- Role: transport squadron
- Garrison/HQ: Alpnach Air Base

The Lufttransport Staffel 8 (LT St8 or LT 8) is a transport squadron of the Swiss Air Force. The pilots are part of the Berufsfliegerkorps. A third of the pilots are militia pilots employed by civilian employers. The Lufttransport Staffel 8 is, together with the Lufttransport Staffel 6, part of the Lufttransport Geschwader 2, which belongs to the Flugplatzkommando 2 (airfield command 2) at Alpnach Air Base. The home base of the Lufttransport Staffel 8 is the Alpnach Air Base. The Lufttransport Staffel 8 carries as coat of arms an oval badge with two light blue symbols in helicopter shape that strongly remind the side view of the Alouette III flying offset so that the two white rotor circles form an oblique 8 in front of an oval dark blue background. The camouflage of the coat of arms shows the same picture, but in dark green / light brown colors.

== History ==
At the beginning of the 1960s the expansion of the helicopter fleet in the Swiss Air Force started. This led to the formation of the Lufttransport Staffel 8 and the Lufttransport Staffel 6. The Lufttransport Staffel 8, equipped with 15 Alouette III, completed its first retraining course in October until November 1967. The Lufttransport Staffel 8 used the Alouette III until 2010. In 1974 the separation of the groundcrew and air component took place according to today's Lufttransport Staffel 8 and the groundcrew organization. In 1992 the Lufttransport Staffel 8 introduced the AS332M1 Super Puma, 2001 the AS532UL Cougar. Since 2010 the Lufttransport Staffel 6 uses also the Eurocopter EC635 .

The task of the Lufttransport Staffel 8 is the air transport with helicopters throughout Switzerland.

== Aircraft ==
- Alouette III
- AS332M1 Super Puma
- AS532UL Cougar
- Eurocopter EC635
