= Germaine Seewer =

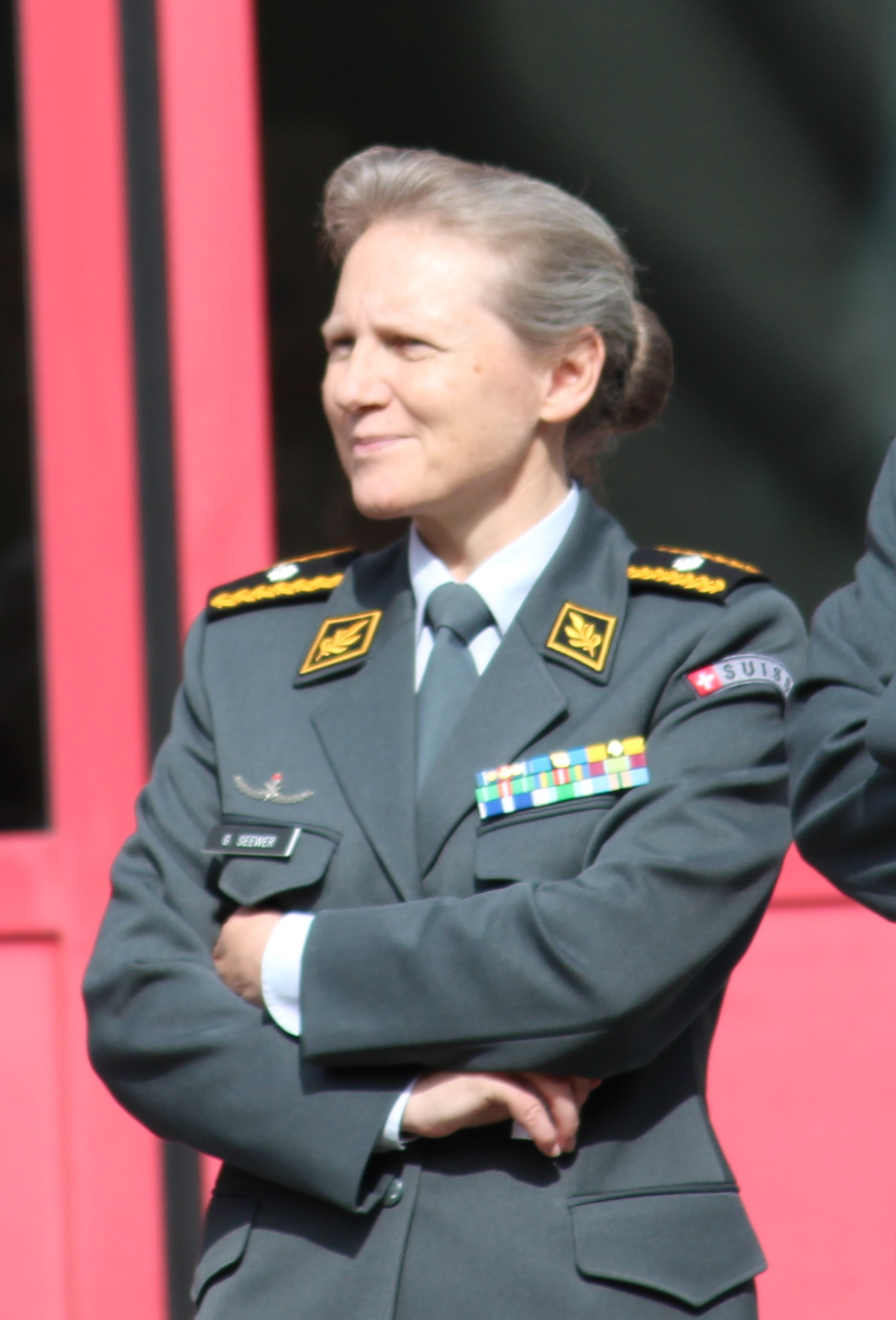
- Seewer in 2017
- Education: ETH Zurich (Dr. nat.)
- Military career
- Allegiance: Switzerland
- Branch: Swiss Armed Forces
- Service years: 1998–present
- Rank: Major general

Germaine Seewer is a Swiss major general and the current head of international relations for the Swiss Armed Forces, since 1 August 2024. Seewer is the highest-ranking woman in the military history of Switzerland.

== Early life and education ==
Seewer was born in the Leuk municipality, in Upper Valais. She studied chemistry at ETH Zurich, and received a Doctorate of Natural Sciences from the institution. While in university Seewer worked with animal scientists and completed her doctoral thesis on meat quality.

== Military service ==
Seewer joined the Swiss Armed Forces in 1998 as a military intelligence officer. In 2000 she deployed as a staff officer with Swisscoy to Kosovo, and in 2004 she deployed as an observer with UNMEE in Ethiopia and Eritrea.

Seewer attended the NATO Defense College in Rome in 2011.

== Dates of rank and duty assignments ==
Insignia	Rank	Duty assignment	Date
	Captain	Air force operations headquarters company, Swisscoy, KFOR	2000
	Major	Command and control section officer (within a brigade)	2002
	Lieutenant Colonel	Air force operations general staff	2003
	Colonel	Chief of Air Force Training and Deputy Chief of Air Force Staff	2010
	Brigadier General	Head of Armed Forces Personnel	2013
	Major General	Commander of the Armed Forces College and Deputy Chief of the Education and Training Command (2020); Head of International Relations (2024)	2020
