= Lufttransport Staffel 7 =

Lufttransport Staffel 7 Escadrille Transport Aérien 7
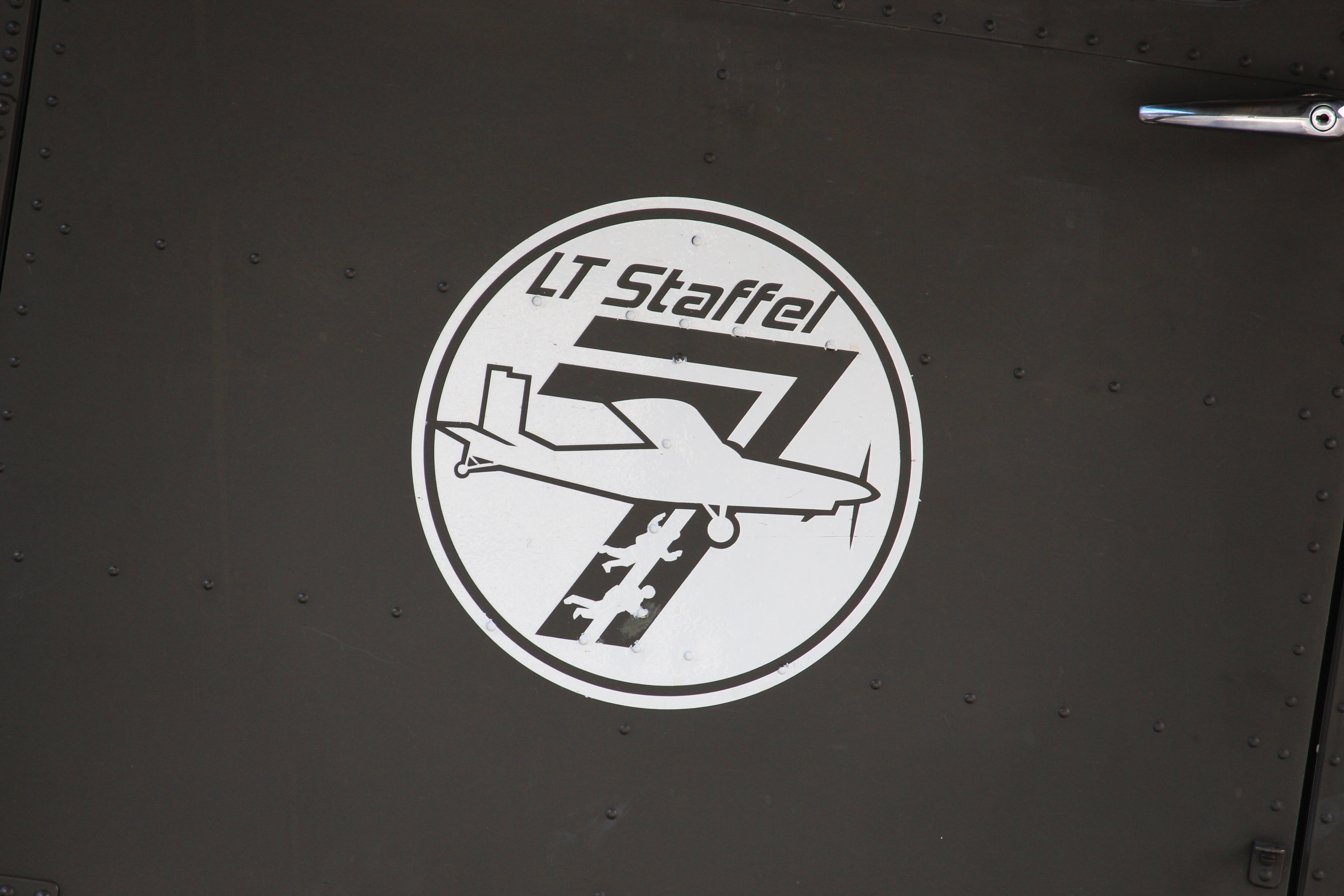
- squadron emblem Lufttransport Staffel 7
- Active: 1967 - today
- Country: Switzerland
- Branch: Swiss Air Force
- Role: transport squadron
- Garrison/HQ: Militärflugplatz Emmen

The Lufttransport Staffel 7 (LT St7 or LT 7) is a militia transport squadron of the Swiss Air Force. The LT St 7 belongs to the Flugplatzkommando 7 (Flpl Kdo 7). It is stationed on the Militärflugplatz Emmen. As coat of arms, the Lufttransport Staffel 7 wears a dark blue side view of a Pilatus PC-6 next to the two parachute jumpers in the free fall in front of the yellow letter LT and the word Staffel and two lines forming a 7 with blue background and a yellow circle. There is also a camouflage version, which has a dark green background, the LT Letters, the word Staffel and the double 7 are white, the side contour of the PC-6 is also by white. Previously the LT Staffel7 had a coat of arms showing a Globi on a red / white parachute against a light blue background and the black inscription: Lufttransport 7 Staffel / Kompanie.

== History ==
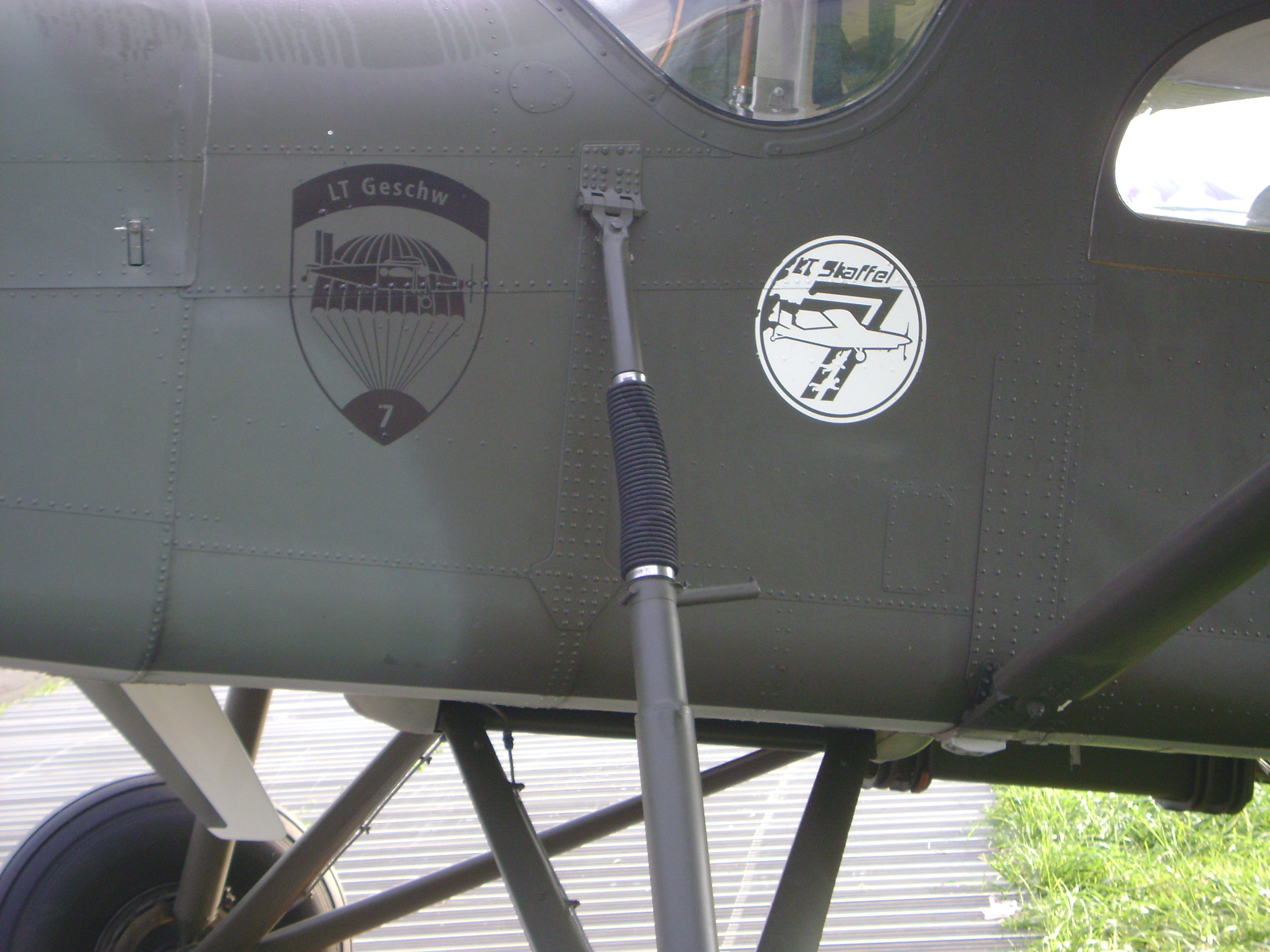
Lufttransport Staffel 7 Badge on Pilatus PC-6

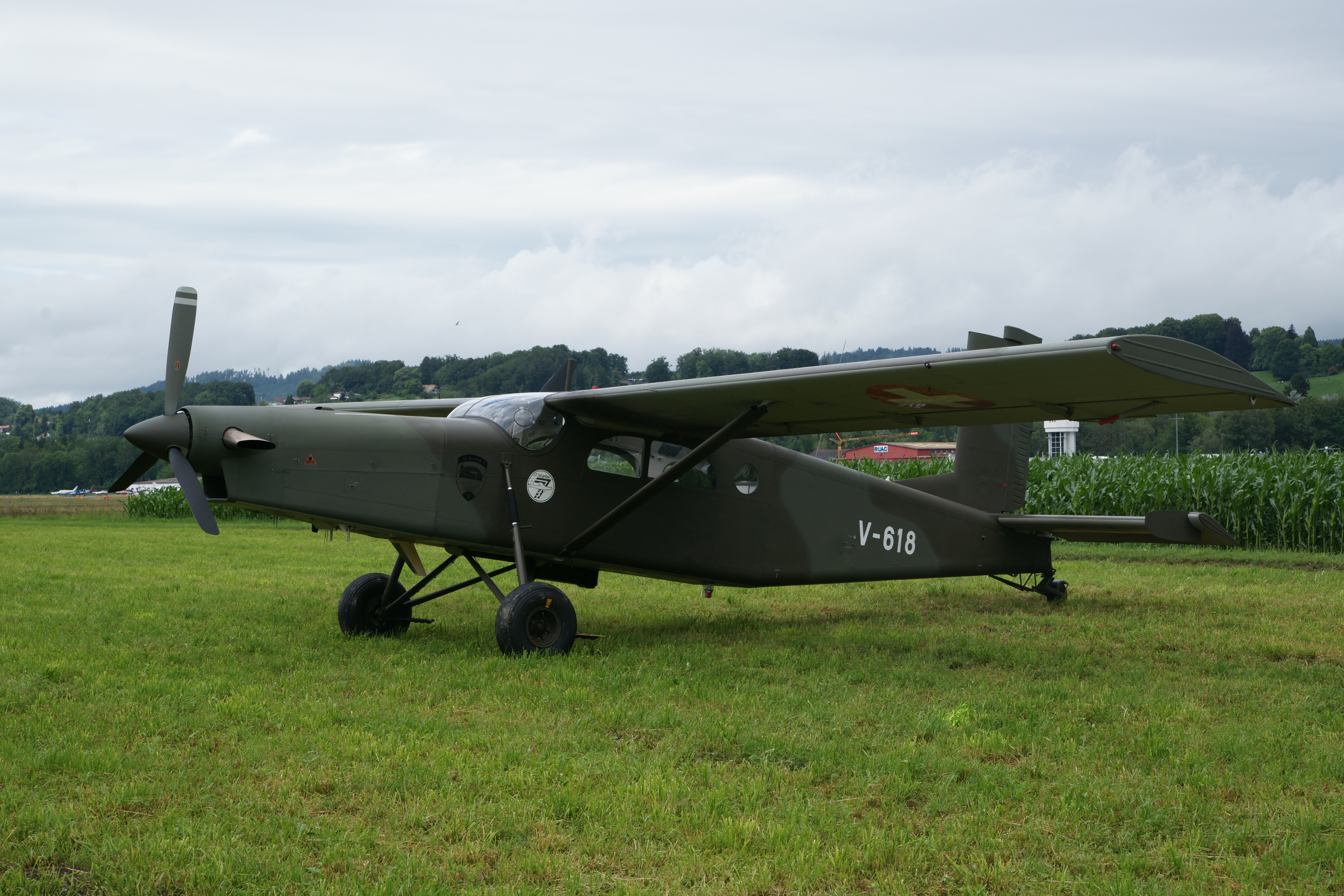
Pilatus PC-6 V-618

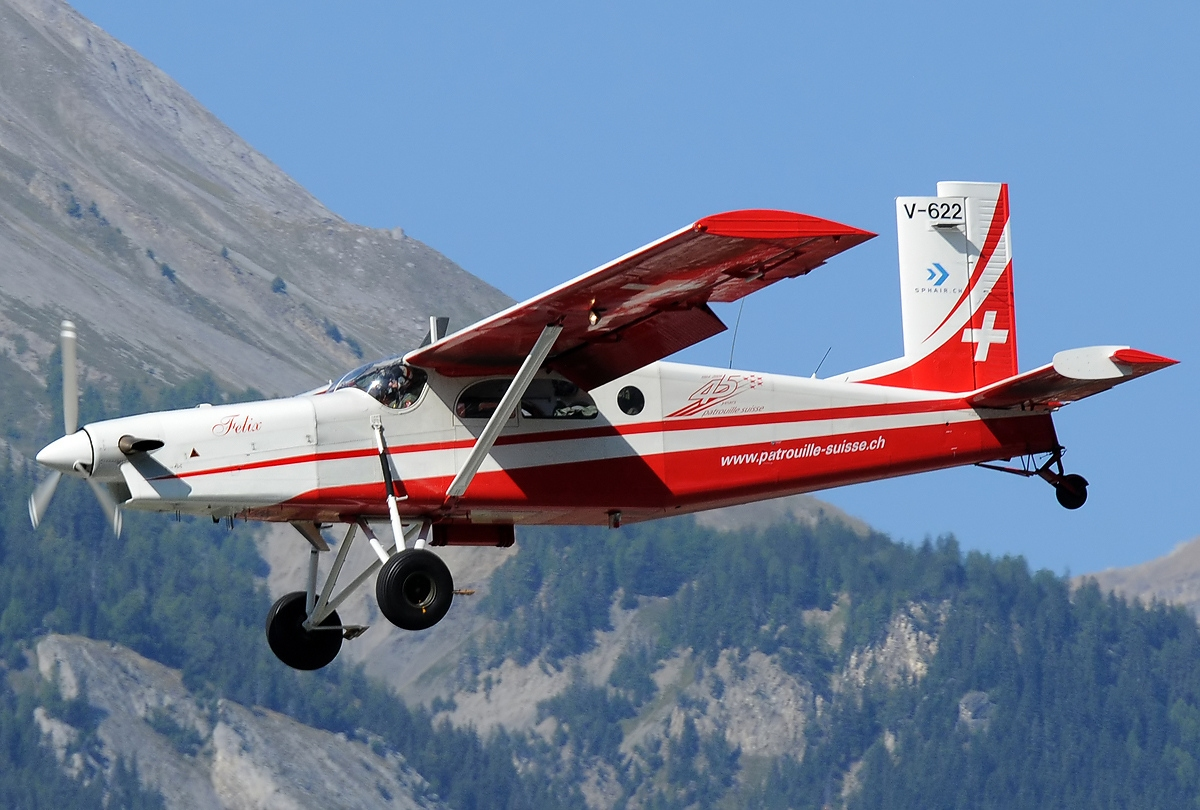
Pilatus PC-6 V-622

The Lufttransport Staffel 7, formerly also known as the light aircraft Transport Staffel 7, is the only air transport squadron of the Swiss Air Force, which exclusively uses fixed-wing aircraft. The pilots are mainly former militia pilots who are no longer active in the militia combat aircraft squadrons because of their age. The Pilatus Porter was an ideal transport aircraft at the time of the first helicopters, with its considerably higher load capacity. In 1967 a first tranche of 12 Pilatus PC-6 Porters was procured. This version of the PC-6 H2M was still equipped with a piston engine. With the procurement from 1978 a second tranche of 6 new turbo-porters were bought and the piston engine-porter converted to PC-6 with turbo engine. At this times Dornier DO-27 were also used for Lufttransport Staffel 7. In earlier years, the "Light Transport Squadron 7" operated the Porter not only for dropping off the parachute reconnaissance troops, for fighting against forest fires, the aircraft could be converted with a water tank. But this was abandoned when the Alouette III and the Bambibucket made it possible to discard larger quantities more precisely. Even training sessions as spray aircraft with chemical substances for the AC exercise of troops could be carried out. However, this is no longer practiced today. Ever since, the Lufttransport Staffel 7 has also carried out its flight operations from temporary airfields. Its home base has been the Militärflugplatz Emmen since the year 2000, before was the military airfield St. Stephan the home base, but this is no more a military airbase.

The Lufttransport Staffel 7 drop off parachute reconnaissance units from heights of up to 8000 meters above sea level. It carries out take-offs and landings from makeshift places on the ground for the tactical deployment STOL. In addition, passenger and material transports and connecting flights are carried out for the most varied locations. The service of Lufttransport Staffel 7 is not limited to the repetition course of the Parachute Reconnaissance Company 17. Throughout the whole year, the pilots ensure the service of the parachute reconnaissance school 83 in Locarno with individual service days. Also the creation of aerial photographs (not to be confused with the airphotography for the cartography) belongs in the varied task area. Nowadays the Lufttransport Staffel 7 still has 15 Pilatus PC-6, 14 of them are in olive-green camouflage color. The Pilatus PC-6 with the tailnumber V-622 is decorated in the colors of the Patrouille Suisse and serves as liaison aircraft for the Commander of the Patrouille Suisse.

== Aircraft ==
- Pilatus PC-6 Porter (PC-6 with piston engine)
- Dornier Do 27
- Pilatus PC-6/B2-H2M
