= Überwachungsgeschwader =

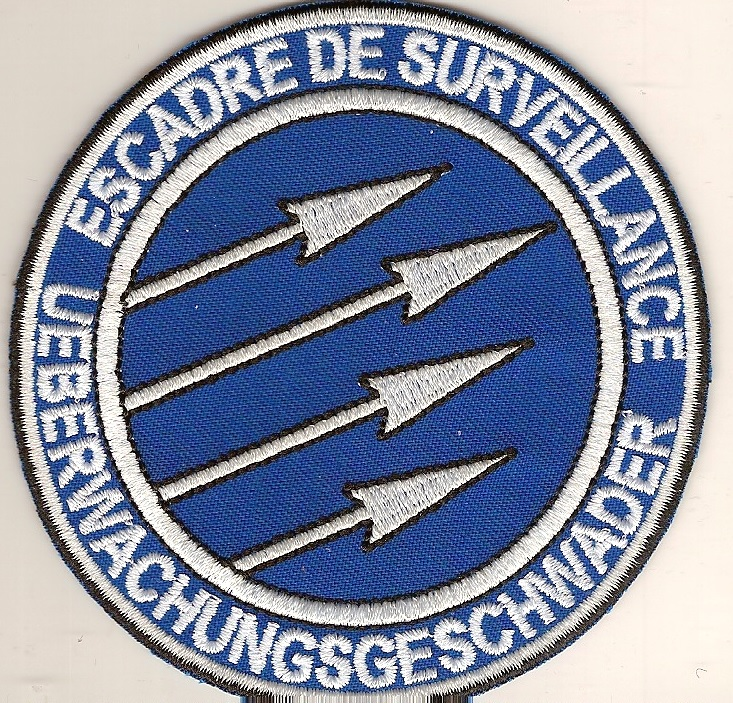
Badge Überwachungsgeschwader

The Überwachungsgeschwader (UeG) (English: surveillance squadron, French: escadre de surveillance, Italian: Squadra di vigilanza) was the overall unit of the Swiss Air Force professional pilots.

== History ==
In the 20th century, Swiss military pilots were fundamentally militia soldiers. On April 4, 1941, the Federal Council decided to create the Überwachungsgeschwader. Those pilots also served as flight instructors for new pilots.

From 1966 the UeG operated the Militär-Helikopter-Rettungsdienst (military helicopter rescue service) as a supplement to the civilian SAR.

The surveillance squadron had its headquarters on the Dübendorf Air Base and had disbanded by the end of 2005.

== See also ==
- Flieger-Flab-Museum
