= Lufttransport Staffel 1 =

Swiss Air force transport squadron

Lufttransport Staffel 1 Escadrille Transport Aérien 1
- Active: 1965 - today
- Country: Switzerland
- Branch: Swiss Air Force
- Role: transport squadron
- Garrison/HQ: Payerne Air Base

The Lufttransport Staffel 1 (LT St 1, French Escadrille Transport Aérien «La UNE» ) a transport squadron of the Swiss Air Force. The homebase of the Lufttransport Staffel 1 is the Payerne Air Base. The squadron «La UNE» is part of the Lufttransportgeschwader 1 together with the Lufttransport Staffel 5 (French Escadrille Transport Aérien 5 ). The coat of arms of the Lufttransport Staffel 1 is a black bat before an orange number 1 on a green background.

== History ==
The Lufttransport Staffel 1 was founded in 1965 and is a helicopter squadron of the French speaking part of Switzerland. Until 1973, the Lufttransport Staffel 1 also used the Piper Super Cub. From 1968 to 1992 it used Alouette ll, and the Alouette lll from 1974 to 2010. Nowadays it consists of 18 professional and militia pilots flying with Super Puma, Cougar and EC635. Their main tasks are air transport in favor of the troops of the army and the transport of goods on the line. Other tasks are Search and Rescue. If necessary, the Lufttransport Staffel 1 also supports the civilian authorities (e.g., in police operations, in the fight against forest fires or in the case of evacuations due to avalanches) and monitoring the border on surveillance flights. A team of the airfield commando Payerne and thus also the Lufttransport Staffel 1, consisting of 2 pilots and 3 mechanics, has been doing a 16-week mission in Kosovo in 2002 for the KFOR.

The Lufttransport Staffel 1 can count on the night vision devices and navigation devices of their helicopters. For this reason the LT 1 has chosen the night-time active bat for its logo.

== Aircraft ==
- Piper PA-18 Super Cub
- Alouette II
- Alouette III
- AS332M1 Super Puma
- AS532UL Cougar
- Eurocopter EC635
