= Lufttransport Staffel 5 =

Lufttransport Staffel 5 Escadrille Transport Aérien 5
- Active: 1962 - today
- Country: Switzerland
- Branch: Swiss Air Force
- Role: transport squadron
- Garrison/HQ: Payerne Air Base

The Lufttransport Staffel 5 (LT St 5, French Escadrille Transport Aérien 5 ) is a transport squadron of the Swiss Air Force. The homebase of the Lufttransport Staffel 5 is the Payerne Air Base. The Lufttransport Staffel 5 is part of the Lufttransportgeschwader 1 together with the Lufttransport Staffel 1 (French Escadrille Transport Aérien «La UNE» ). The coat of arms of the Lufttransport Staffel 1 is a side view of a green grasshopper in front of a white circular ground, which shows the white number 5 on one of its wings. The camouflage version of the coat of arms shows the same image, but in dark green shades.

== History ==
The air transport unit and company 5 was founded in March 1962 as a light-transport unit 5 under the command of Hauptmann (Captain)Fritz Kolb. The Lufttransport Staffel 5 used Piper Super Cub, Hiller UH-12 B, Alouette II and Dornier Do 27 on the military airfield Reichenbach and on the Military airfield Frutigen. In 1964, the Pilatus P-2 was introduced by the Lufttransport Staffel 5 and from 1965 on the military airfield Kägiswil became the wartime home base of the unit. At the end of the 1960s, the Pilatus PC-6 and the Junkers Ju 52 were used by the Lufttransport Staffel 5. From 1974 to 2010 the Alouette III was used by the Lufttransport Staffel 5. As of 1992, the Lufttransport Staffel 5 operated the AS332M1 Super Puma. These were stationed at the Interlaken Air Base airport until 2003. The AS532UL Cougar was also entering service at the Lufttransport Staffel 5 and in 2010 followed the Eurocopter EC635.

The task of the Lufttransport Staffel 5 is the air transport with helicopters throughout Switzerland.

== Aircraft ==
- Piper PA-18 Super Cub
- Dornier Do 27
- Hiller UH-12B
- Alouette II
- Alouette III
- Pilatus P-2
- Pilatus PC-6
- Junkers Ju 52
- AS332M1 Super Puma
- AS532UL Cougar
- Eurocopter EC635
