= Alpnach Air Base =

Swiss air base

Alpnach Air Base Militärflugplatz Alpnach
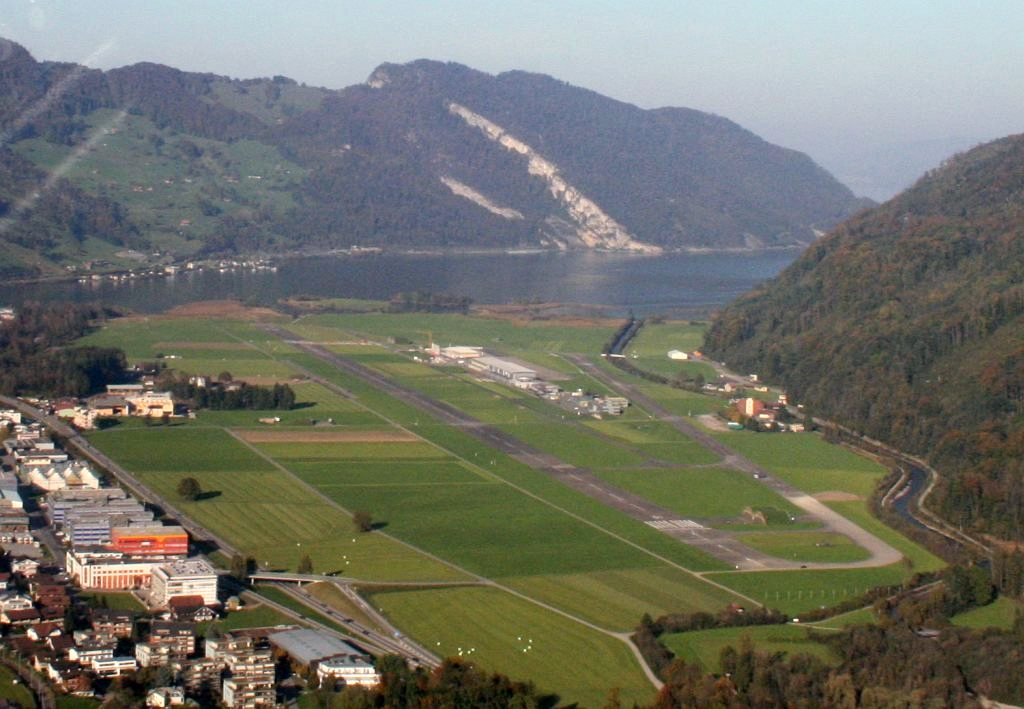
- Alpnach Air Base
- IATA: none; ICAO: LSMA

Summary
- Airport type: Military
- Serves: Alpnach
- Occupants: Swiss Air Force RUAG
- Elevation AMSL: 1,460 ft (450 m)
- Coordinates: 46°56′19″N 8°17′3.01″E

Map
- Location in Switzerland

Runways
Direction	Length		Surface
Direction	ft	m	Surface
01/19		1,500

The Air Base Alpnach (ICAO code LSMA) is a Swiss Air Force airfield near the town Alpnach in Canton of Obwalden in Switzerland. It has a concrete runway with a length of 1,500 meters (4,900 ft) and a width of 40 meters (130 ft), as well as several taxiways and hangars.

== History ==
As early as 1929 there was a landing strip at Alpnach. It was expanded in 1939 to 850 by 130 meters (2,790 ft × 430 ft). In 1940 two wooden hangars were added and in September 1942, Fliegerabteilung 7 was based at Alpnach. This is considered the official start of the airfield.

The first concrete runway was built in 1943 as part of the Swiss Reduitstrategie. It had a length of 875 meters (2,871 ft). Furthermore, eight type U-43 aircraft shelters and bunkers for command and ammunition were built. From 1947 to 1994, the 19th Squadron was stationed in Alpnach. There were 2 extensions of the runway: 1952 to 1,500 meters (4,900 ft), and finally in 1959 to 1,950 meters (6,400 ft).

From 1952 aircraft caverns were built into the rock of the adjacent Mueterschwanderberg Mountain which hosts also an artillery fortress facing Nidwalden. In 1960, the cavern facility was officially handed over to the Directorate of Military airfields. Beginning in 1958, de Havilland DH-112 Venom jets operated from Alpnach in the case of a war. In 1973, the aircraft type used changed to the Hawker Hunter and in 1979 there was a further change to the F-5 "Tiger". Because of the Army XXI reforms, flight operations from the caverns were terminated. On 20 January 1964, helicopter flying started at Alpnach.

The Highway A8 was twice tested as an emergency takeoff runway, using temporary taxiways to the base.

In 1994 the last Air Force jet training courses took place at Alpnach, and on 23 September 1995 the last Tiger F-5E left. In 2004, Air Base Alpnach was threatened with the closure of the airfield, but the Obwalden government successfully lobbied for the airfield.

In May 2012, renovation work on Hangars 2 and 3 began as well the building for a new Hangar 4.

== Today ==
Alpnach Air Base is the main logistical base of the helicopter of the Swiss Air Force. Standard helicopter types used at Air Base Alpnach are the Aérospatiale Super Puma, Eurocopter AS532UL Cougar Mk1 and Eurocopter EC 635.

== Other uses ==
The RUAG Switzerland AG operates on the airfield a location for the maintenance of civil and military helicopter. The airfield is used for various other uses. The runways may be used outside normal operating hours of the airport, for example by in-line skaters. A model airplane club uses the southern half of the airfield .

== See also ==
- RUAG
- Military significance of Switzerlands Motorways
