= Zielflugstaffel 12 =

Zielflugstaffel 12 No 12 Target squadron
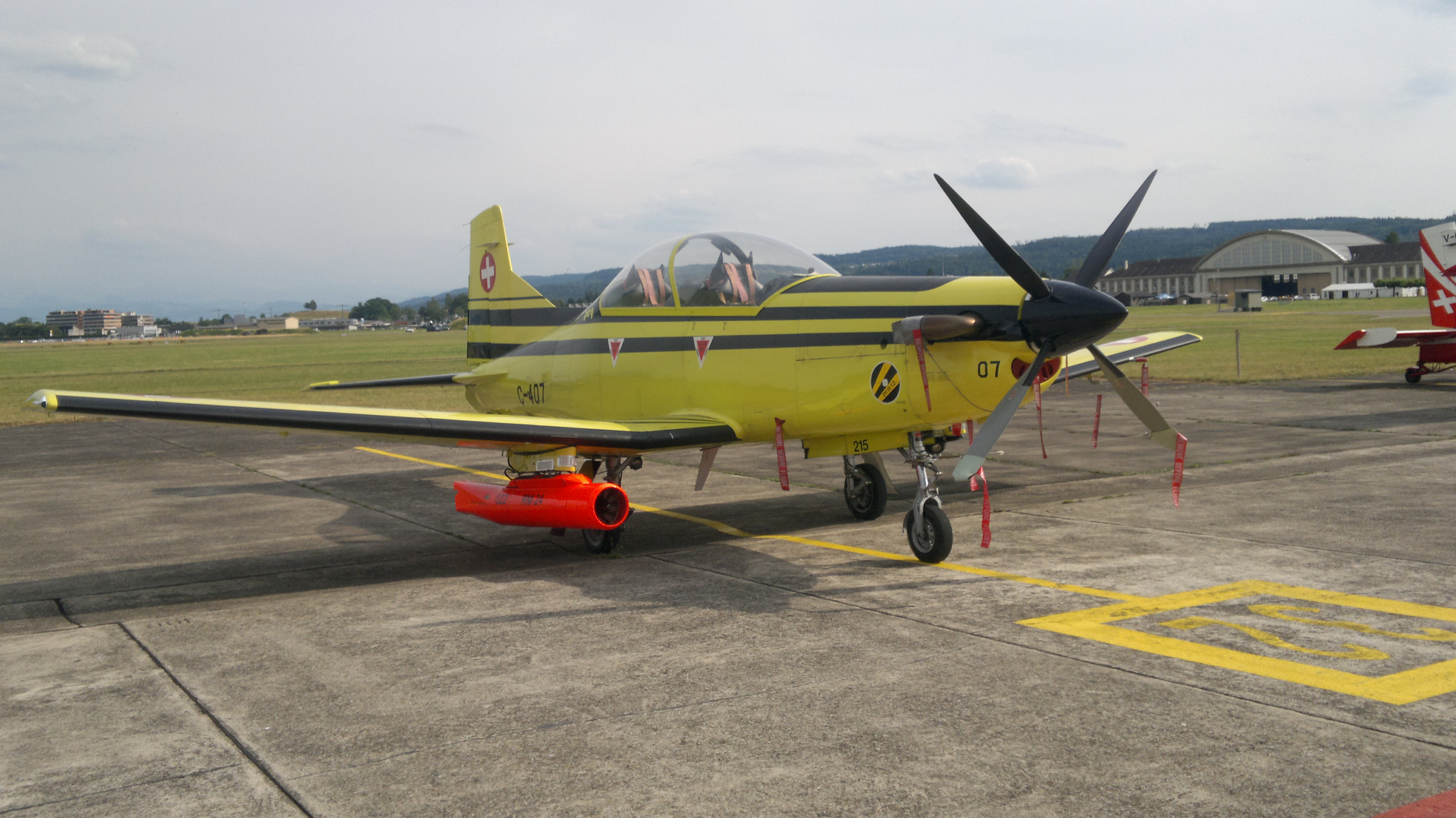
- Pilatus PC-9 C-407 with squadron emblem Zielflugstaffel 12
- Active: 1925-today
- Country: Switzerland
- Branch: Swiss Air Force
- Role: Targed tug
- Garrison/HQ: Militärflugplatz Emmen

Zielflugstaffel 12 (No 12 Target squadron), former known as Fliegerstaffel 12 of the Swiss Air Force is a militia squadron equipped with Northrop F-5E and Pilatus PC-9 and part of the Flugplatzkommando 7. The home base of the unit is Militärflugplatz Emmen. As coat of arms, the Zielflugstaffel carries a badge with a yellow and black target pattern, a bullseye and the writing "Zfl St 12".

== History ==
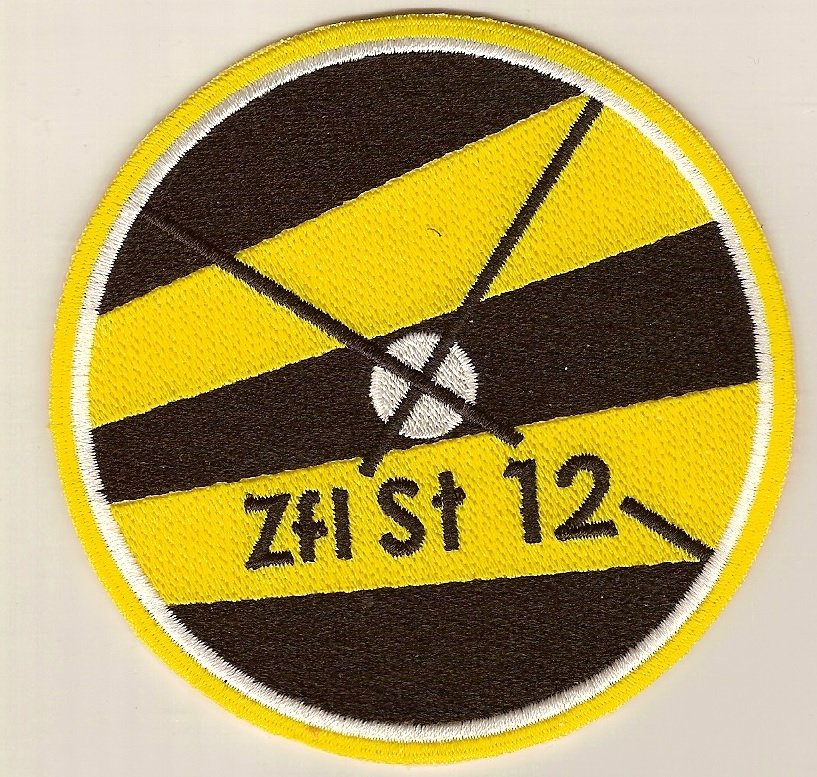
Squadron Badge of the Zielflugstaffel 12.

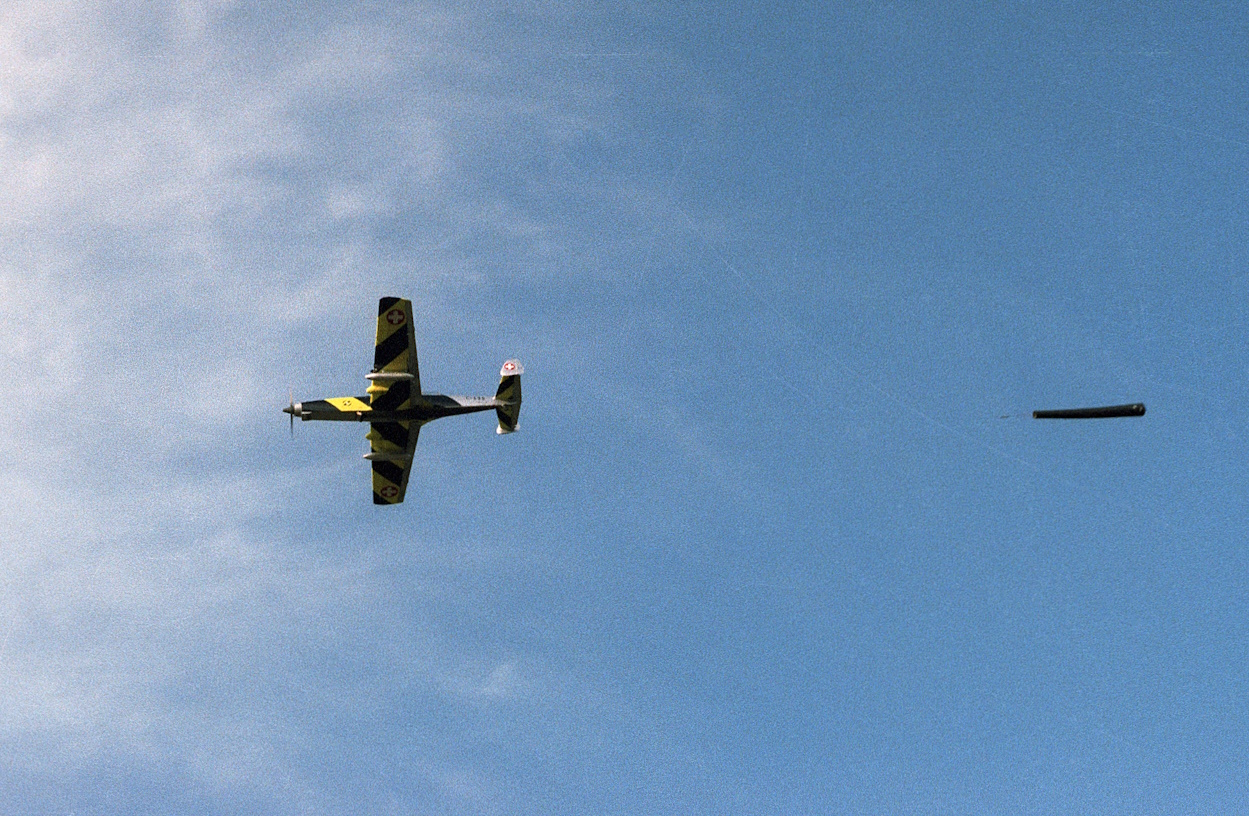
A C-3605 target tug has retracted the trailing target with the winch after its target flights.

In 1925, the Fliegerkompanie 12 was founded. From 1939 to 1950 the unit used aircraft of the type Morane D-3801. In 1945, the squadron was renamed to Fliegerstaffel 12. The original coat of arms of Fliegerstaffel 12 was a white Halberd with the number 12 on the blade and black wings on the handle against a red background.

With the De Havilland D.H. 100 Vampire the unit received their first jet aircraft in 1952 and operated it as a combat squadron until being transferred to the De Havilland Venom, which was the aircraft flown around the beginning of 1970. Most likely the squadron ceased to exist sometime after that year.

The Fliegerstaffel 12 was formed again after disbandment of the Zielfliegerkorps 5 and became a designated target squadron by the name Zielflugstaffel 12. The Zielflugstaffel 12 continued to use the Vampire until 1990 as a target aircraft. Some Vampires received a black and orange paint scheme. A black and yellow scheme was hardly ever used. Additionally, Zielflugstaffel 12 operated the C-3605 aircraft as target tug, which remained in use until 1987. From 1990 to 1994 the Hawker Hunter replaced the Vampires as a target aircraft, carrying laser reflectors. The C-3606 was replaced as a tug in 1987 by the PC-9. In 1994 the F-5E Tiger took over the task of the Hawker Hunter at the Zielflugstaffel 12.

The crews of the Zielflugstaffel 12 are former militia pilots of the Fliegerstaffel 6, Fliegerstaffel 8 and Fliegerstaffel 19, which have reached the age limits on the combat aircraft squadrons. The main task is to present flying targets as air threats to various units of the army. The main customer is the Ground to Air Defense, GBA.

The PC-9 in its tug role is equipped with a winch for a towing target under the wing. The Fliegerstaffel 24 uses the same PC-9 with the "Vista 5" Ericsson pod for electronic warfare. The Fliegerstaffel 24 was integrated into the Zielflugstaffel 12 in 1994, but it differs so much in operational terms that it may be regarded as an independent squadron. Zielflugstaffel 12 uses also the 11 red /white F-5E’s that are used by the Patrouille Suisse with a winch on the centerline pylon for air-to-air gunnery training. The future of the Zielflugstaffel 12 is uncertain on the one hand because of the F-5E scheduled to be phased out by 2025. Due to the planned introduction of modern air defense systems under the designation BODLUV2020, it was decided earlier to discontinue the target flying operation with the PC-9 by the end of 2016, since such exercises with modern systems would no longer have been necessary. However, since the STINGER and the medium-sized air raid cannon system Oerlikon 35 mm will be replaced later than expected and the replacement of the Rapier is put on hold, the passing out of the PC-9 is being retarded. In 2016 the rumour was that 4 PC-9 should stay in use until 2025. Of these two machines (C-907 and C-908) were intended as target tugs and the other two (C-911 and C-912) as radar jammers.

== Incidents ==
Four Morane D-3801s of Staffel 12 collided with mountainous terrain on March 16, 1946, near Guttannen on their way to Interlaken.

== Aircraft ==
- Dewoitine D1+
- Dewoitine D9
- Comte AC1
- Dewoitine D.27
- Morane D-3800
- Morane D-3801
- Messerschmitt Bf 109
- C-3605
- De Havilland D.H. 100
- Hawker Hunter
- Pilatus PC-9
- Northrop F-5
