= Fliegerstaffel 17 =

Fliegerstaffel 17 17ème Escadrille Squadriglia d'aviazione 17
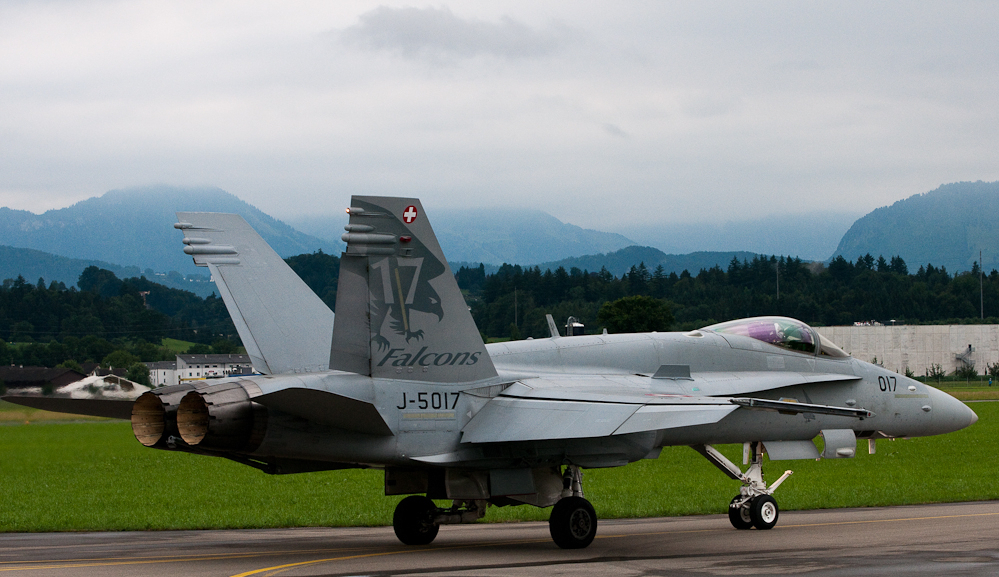
- F/A-18C J-5017 of the Fliegerstaffel 17 Falcons
- Active: 1925-today
- Country: Switzerland
- Branch: Swiss Air Force
- Role: Fighter squadron
- Garrison/HQ: Payerne Air Base

Fliegerstaffel 17 (No. 17 Squadron) "Falcons" of the Swiss Air Force is a Berufsfliegerkorps squadron of professional pilots flying McDonnell Douglas F/A-18. Together with Fliegerstaffel 6 it forms Fliegergeschwader 11. The home base of the squadron is Payerne Air Base. Fliegerstaffel 17 features a red falcon on a white ground with the black number 17 as its coat of arms.

== History ==
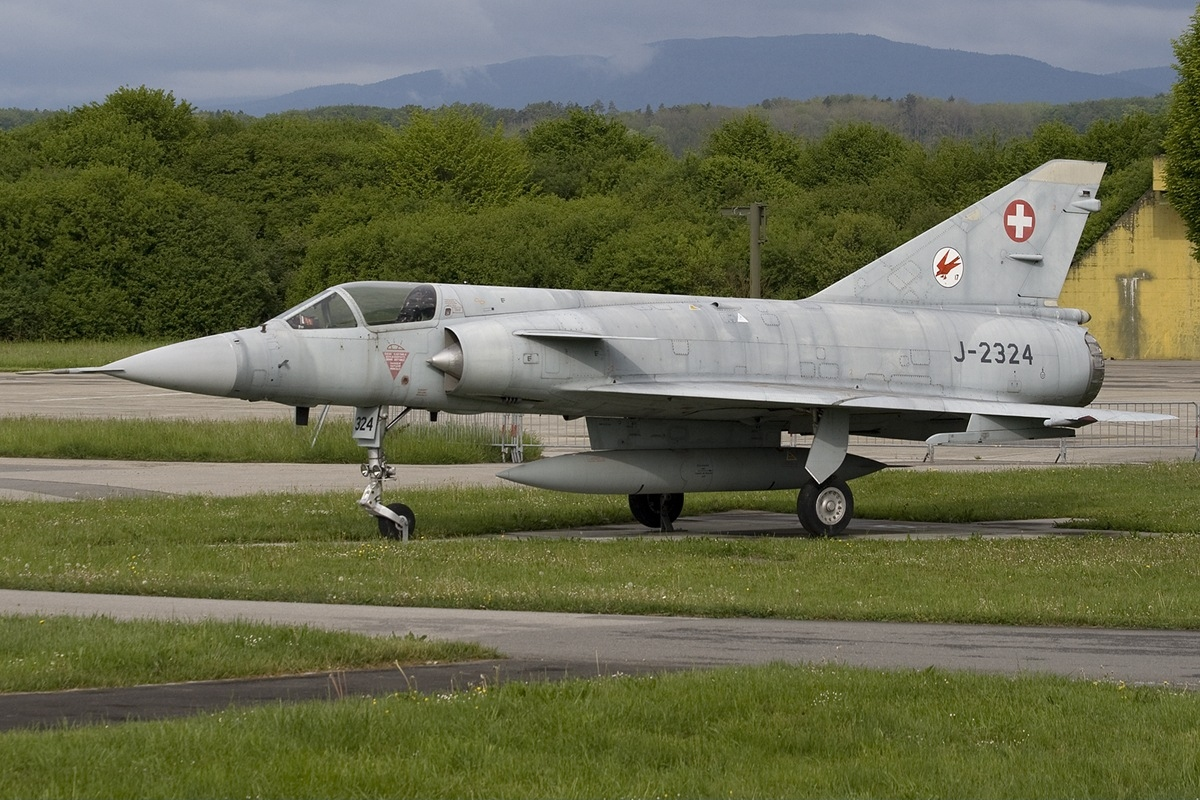
Mirage IIIS with a squadron badge of the Fliegerstaffel17 on the tail

From 1925 to 1939 the unit, which was founded as interception aviation company 17 (Jagd-Flieger-Kompanie 17), was equipped with eight Häfeli DH-5s and a Dewoitine D-27. From 1939 to 1942, flights were operated with C-35 and Fokker CV from Belinzona, Littau, Rümlang, Weinfelden, Hilfikon, Spreitenbach and other then airfields. In 1942 they were trained to fly the C-3603 at their new home, Buochs Air Base. From 1945 to 1947 its flight operations with C-3603 were carried out from Raron. In the post-war period, the interception company 17 was transferred into No. 3 squadron of the UeG (Überwachungsgeschwader) and used various aircraft types, among them the Morane D‐3800 from 1947 to 1955 and the C-3604 from 1947 to 1956.

In 1952, today's Fliegerstaffel 17 was founded as a unit of pilots only. The first jet aircraft operations of the Fliegerstaffel 17 were taken up from 1955 with De Havilland D.H. 112 Mk 4 Venom on Buochs Air Base and Militärflugplatz Emmen, which continued until 1967. In 1963, the "Falcon" was introduced as a new squadron emblem. From 1969 to 1975, flight operations were conducted with Mirage IIIS from Turtmann Air Base, followed by a period at Payerne Air Base from 1976 to 1997. After that it became the first squadron of the Swiss Air Force flying the F/A-18 Hornet. At the end of 2005, the Überwachunggeschwader was disbanded and its units were transferred to the similar Berufsfliegerkorps. In 2010, the F/A-18C with the tailnumber J-5017 received a permanent squadron painting. In normal flight operation the J-5017 is given priority to the pilots of Fliegerstaffel 17, but is also flown by other pilots. If the current F/A-18 Hornet Solo Display pilot is from the Fliegerstaffel 17, he will fly the J-5017, if available.

The co-founder of the F/A-18 Hornet solo display and head of flight safety Stéphane Rapaz is a pilot at Fliegerstaffel 17. From 2000 to 2002 was, the of today 's Divisional general, Claude Meier commander of the Fliegerstaffel 17.

On the 5 June 2024, the Fliegerstaffel 17 performed landing and take-off exercise on the Payerne A1 section of the motorway.

=== Accidents ===
- On 24 March 1977, two Mirage III (J-2003 and J-2310) collided during a formation flight breakup over Payerne airfield. All parties involved survived the collision, including the commander-in-chief of the Fliegerstaffel 17 and future Chief of the Armed Forces, Christophe Keckeis.
- On 29 August 2016, the F/ A-18C J-5022 hit the ground in the Susten Pass area shortly after take-off at Meiringen Air Base. Its pilot belonging to Fliegerstaffel 17 was killed. As an accident cause, a wrong altitude allocation of the Skyguide air traffic controller at the Tower Meiringen is assumed. The investigation is not yet completed.

== Aircraft ==
- Häfeli DH-5
- Dewoitine D.27
- Fokker C.V
- C-35
- C3603
- C3604
- Morane D-3803
- de Havilland D.H.112 Venom
- Mirage IIIS
- F/A-18
