= Fliegerstaffel 11 =

Swiss Air Force squadron

Fliegerstaffel 11 (Fightersquadron 11) (Tigers) of the Swiss Air Force is a Berufsfliegerkorps squadron equipped with F/A-18 combat jets and, together with Fliegerstaffel 8, is part of Fliegergeschwader 13. The home base of Fliegerstaffel 11 is Meiringen Air Base. Fliegerstaffel 11 is a full member of the NATO Tiger Association and carries a coat of arms depicting a Tiger head on a black background and the wordmark Staffel 11 below the tiger head as its crest.

== History ==
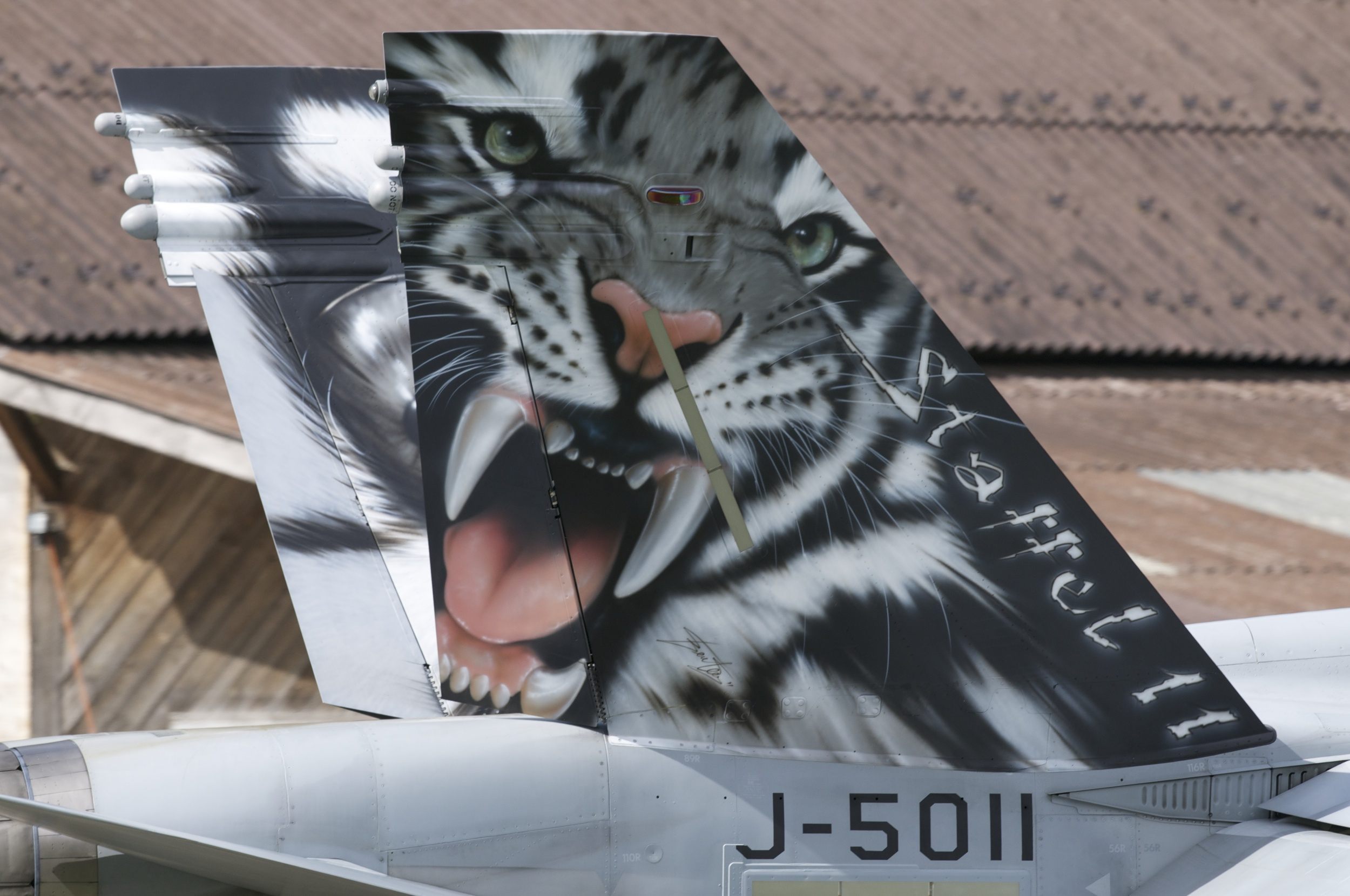
Vertical stabilizer of the J-5011 with tiger coating, 2012

The unit was founded in 1925 as Fliegerkompanie 11 and was equipped with Fokker CVs until 1938. In 1938, Fliegerkompanie 11, switched to the EKW C-35. In 1945 the Fliegerkompanie 11 was renamed to Fliegerstaffel 11. From 1946 to 1959 the Fliegerstaffel 11 used the De Havilland D.H. 100 Vampire from the Alpnach Air Base. From 1959 to 1975 the squadron flew the Hawker Hunter from the new home base Meiringen, afterwards from 1975 to 1979 Alpnach was again the home base. Afterwards, now at Dübendorf Air Base, the training was carried out on the F-5 Tiger and the Fliegerstaffel 11 used this aircraft type from 1979 to 1997. Under the command of Werner "Höffi" Hoffmann, the Fliegerstaffel 11 transferred from the F-5 Tiger to F/A-18 Hornet in 1999.

On Friday, 16 December 2005, the Fliegerstaffel 11 was transferred to the present homebase, Meiringen Air Base, under the commandant Peter «Pablo» Merz from the Dübendorf Air Base (who was not an airbase for wartime operations in the jet age). Peter Merz as a backseater and Michael «Elvis» Rainer as a pilot carried out the last take-off, of an F/A-18 from Dübendorf with the F/A-18D J-5235. The Fliegerstaffel 11 is the only F/A-18 squadron in the world to be operated from an Aircraft cavern in daily operation. Because Dübendorf was the homebase of the Fliegerstaffel 11 largest number of pilots in the Air Operations Center and the Air Defense & Directions Center in the Skyguide Building and the Berufsfliegerkorps at Dübendorf are from the Fliegerstaffel 11. The Commander of the Patrouille Suisse Nils «Jamie» Hämmerli, PC-7 Team Daniel "Stampa" Stämpfli and the co-founder of the F/A-18 Hornet Solo Display and former commander of the PC-7 Teams Werner «Höffi» Hoffmann are pilots from the Fliegerstaffel 11.

=== Tiger Association ===
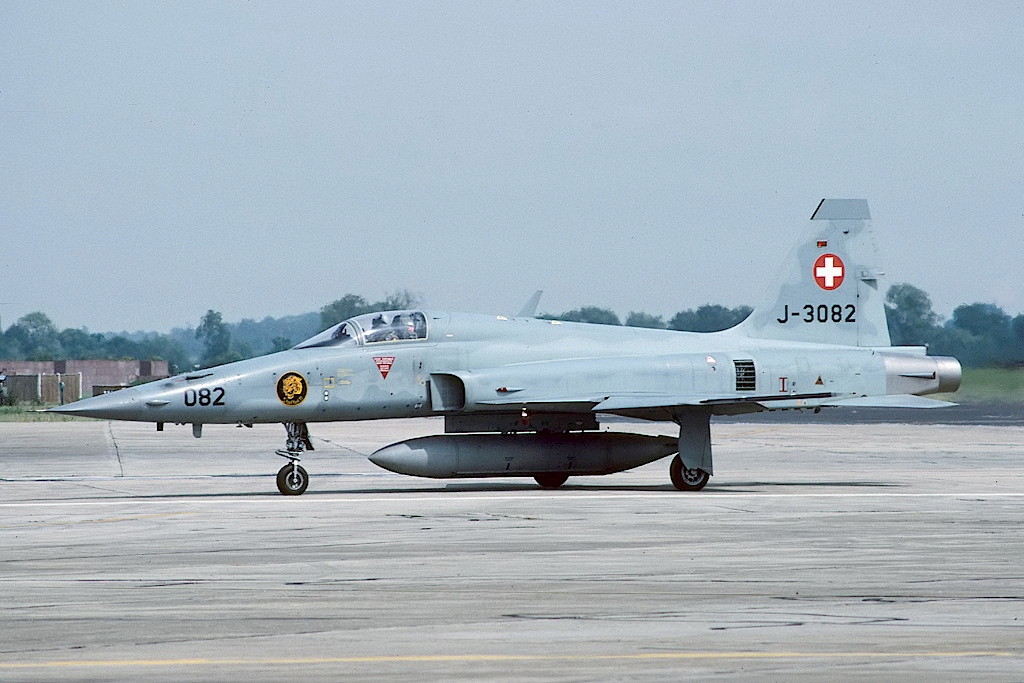
One of the three machines in England, which got a new Squadron badge at the Tiger Meet 1991 at RAF Fairford - a couple flew a show that year

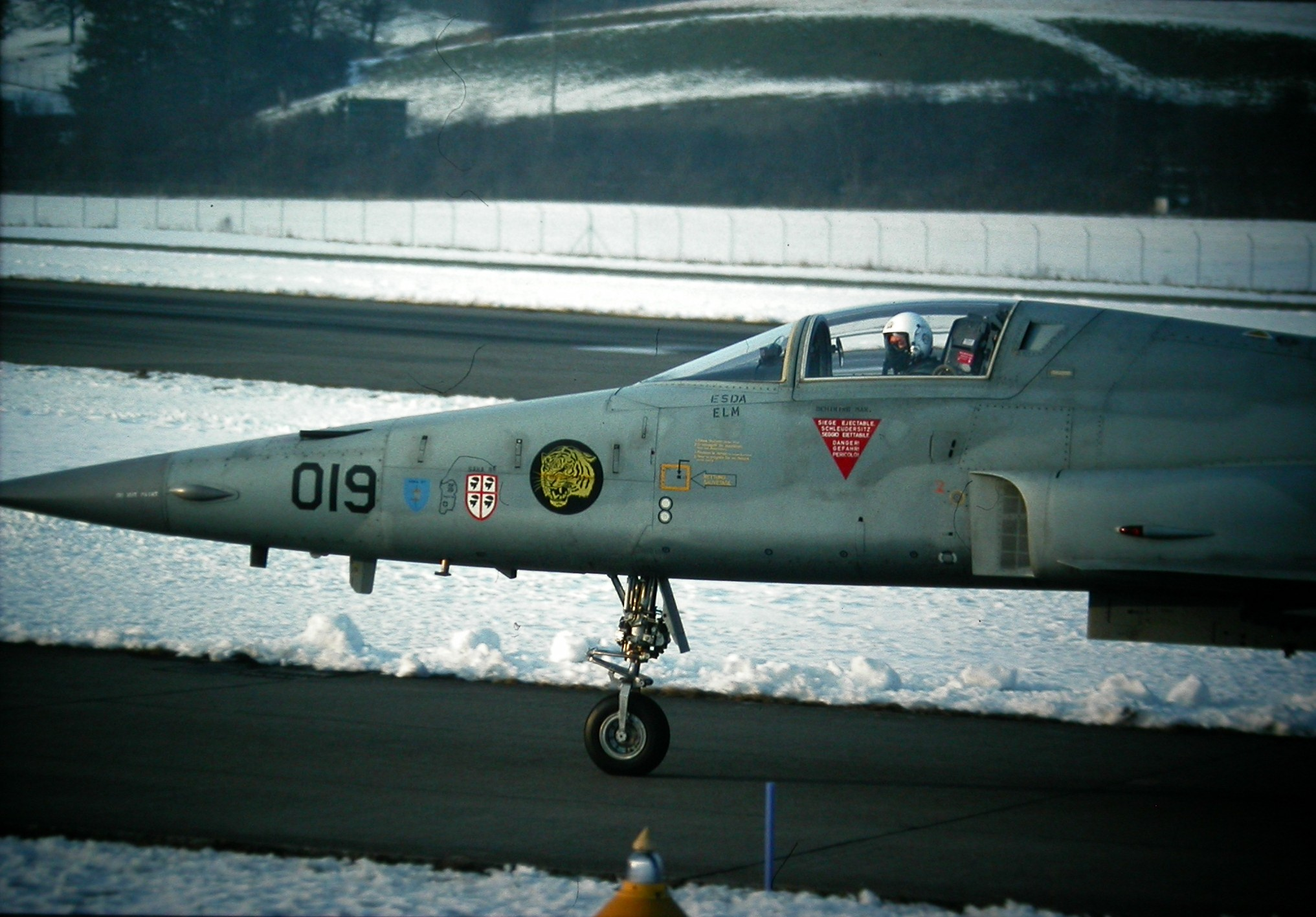
The usual squadron badge of the Fliegerstaffel 11 (without the writing “Staffel 11”) on an F-5.

Although Switzerland is not a NATO member, the Fliegerstaffel 11 is a member of the 'Tiger Association', which links all the squadrons with a tiger as a squadron emblem. The Fliegerstaffel 11was the first time as an observer on the NATO Tiger Meet 1981 at Bitburg. The pilots traveled with the Beechcraft Twin Bonanza A-711, this aircraft with the yellow bottom was adorned with tiger stripes, on the engines and a red shark mouth. As of 1991, Fliegerstaffel 11 was no longer just an observer at the Tiger Meet but as a full member with the F-5E. However, there was no special paint, only a new, color-changed squadron emblem on the front. In 1994 and 1996, the pilots from Fliegerstaffel 11were again only as observers with the Learjet 35 T-781 at the tigermeet. From 2002 on as active member with the F / A-18.

The Fliegerstaffel 11 won the award Silver Tiger Trophy in 1982 and 2008. From 24 to 27 March 1983 and from 17 to 21 October 1986, the Fliegerstaffel 11 was the host of the Mini Tiger Meets at Meiringen. From 11 to 14 March 2005 the Fliegerstaffel 11 was the organizer of the Snow Survival Exercise in Sion. Because of these Tigermeets usually one or more aircraft of “tigersquadrons” received a special "tiger" painting. In 2003 it was decided to do it as well with a F/A-18C for the Fliegerstaffel 11. The choice was the F / A-18C with the registration J-5011, the 11 for theFliegerstaffel 11. However, the machine received no major change for the first time, only the additional tank and the AIM-9 Sidewinder dummys on the wingtiprails got a tigerstyle paint. In 2004, the aircraft received a permanent color scheme. This machine is used for TigerMeeting events. In normal flight operation the J-5011 is given priority to the squadron commander of Fliegerstaffel 11, but is also flown by other pilots. If the current F/A-18 Hornet Solo Display pilot is from the Fliegerstaffel 11, he will fly the J-5011, if possible. Fliegerstaffel 11 was the first squadron of the Swiss Air Force which received an aircraft with a permanent special painting, and a few years passed until the Fliegerstaffel 17, Fliegerstaffel 18 and Fliegerstaffel 19 also got their own squadron aircraft.

=== Accidents ===
On 23 October, a two-seat F/A-18D crashed into the mountain Lopper near the Pilatus. The pilot Stefan "Stiwi" Jäger of the Fliegerstaffel 11 and the Aviation medical examiner Volker Lang of the Aeromedical Center (AMC) as passenger were killed. The machine was in the course of a patrol mission on the way to Lake Lucerne and simulated Air policing training. The aviation medical examiner flew, according to the Luftwaffe, to get an impression of the requirements in the cockpit of a fighter jet on such an air policing mission. As a result of the Aviation accidents and incidents investigation of the Military justice, a "misconception of the situation" has been determined by the pilot as the reason for the controlled flight into terrain. In the investigation report, the investigator of the military jury recommended, on the one hand, that passenger flights should be carried out on combat aircraft only in good weather, and on the other hand the examination of the training of the reversing maneuver, especially in bad weather situations and in low level flight. This could have consequences for the security management of the Swiss Air Force (as of June 2014).

== Aircraft ==
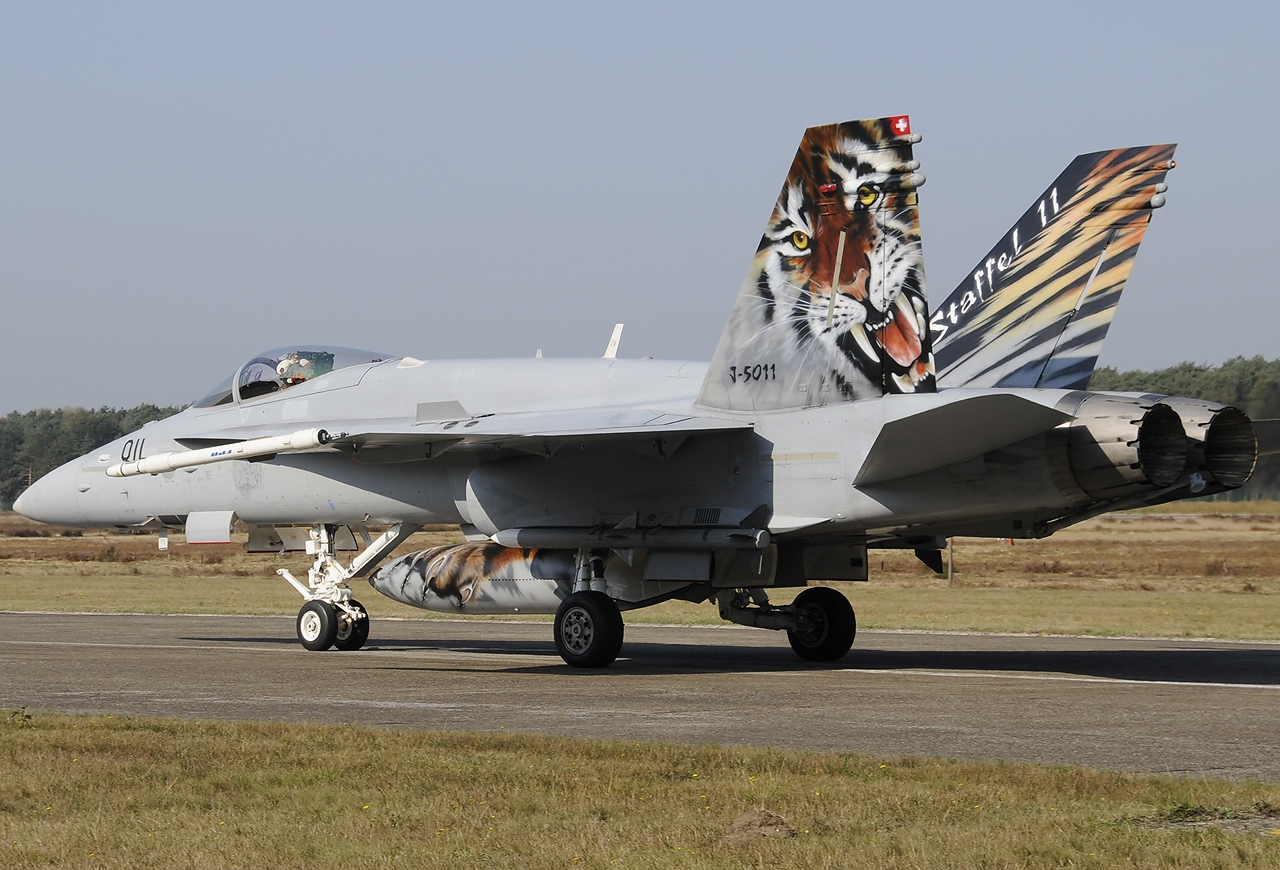
J-50’’’11’’, F/A-18C Hornet, of the Fliegerstaffel ‘’11’’, in 2009

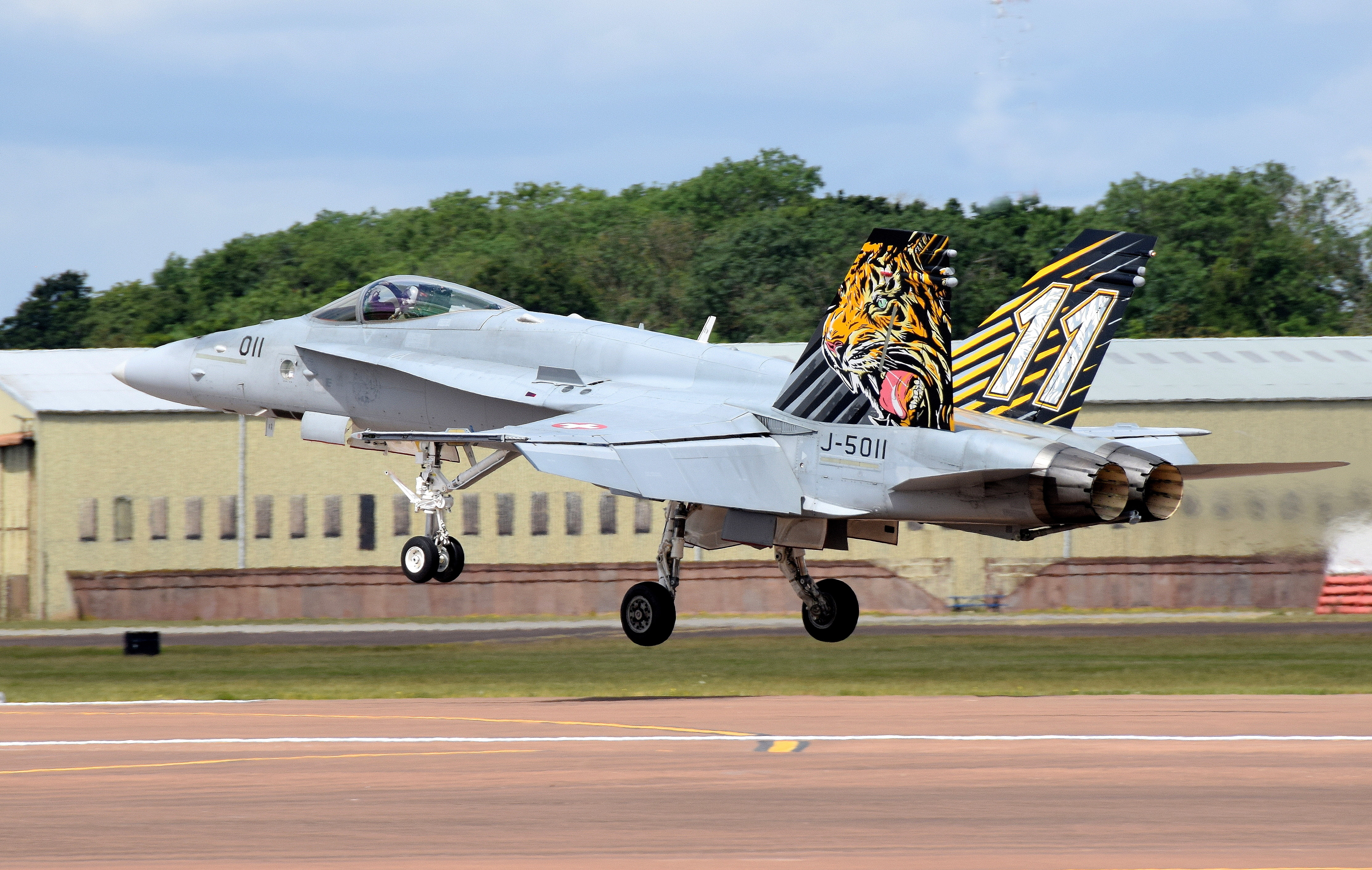
F/A-18C Hornet (J-5011) in 2019 tiger markings

- Fokker C.V
- EKW C-35
- De Havilland D.H. 100
- Hawker Hunter
- Northrop F-5
- McDonnell Douglas F/A-18

== Bibliography ==
- NATO Tigers – Fifty Years. NATO Tiger Association, 2011.
- Peter Bosshard, Donat Achermann: Menschen Maschinen Missionen: Geschichten vom Militärflugplatz Dübendorf 1914–2014. Schweizer Luftwaffe, FO-Fotorotar, Egg 2014, ISBN 978-3-033-04653-5.
