= Fliegerstaffel 6 =

Unit of Swiss Air Force

Fliegerstaffel 6 6ème Escadrille Squadriglia d'aviazione 6
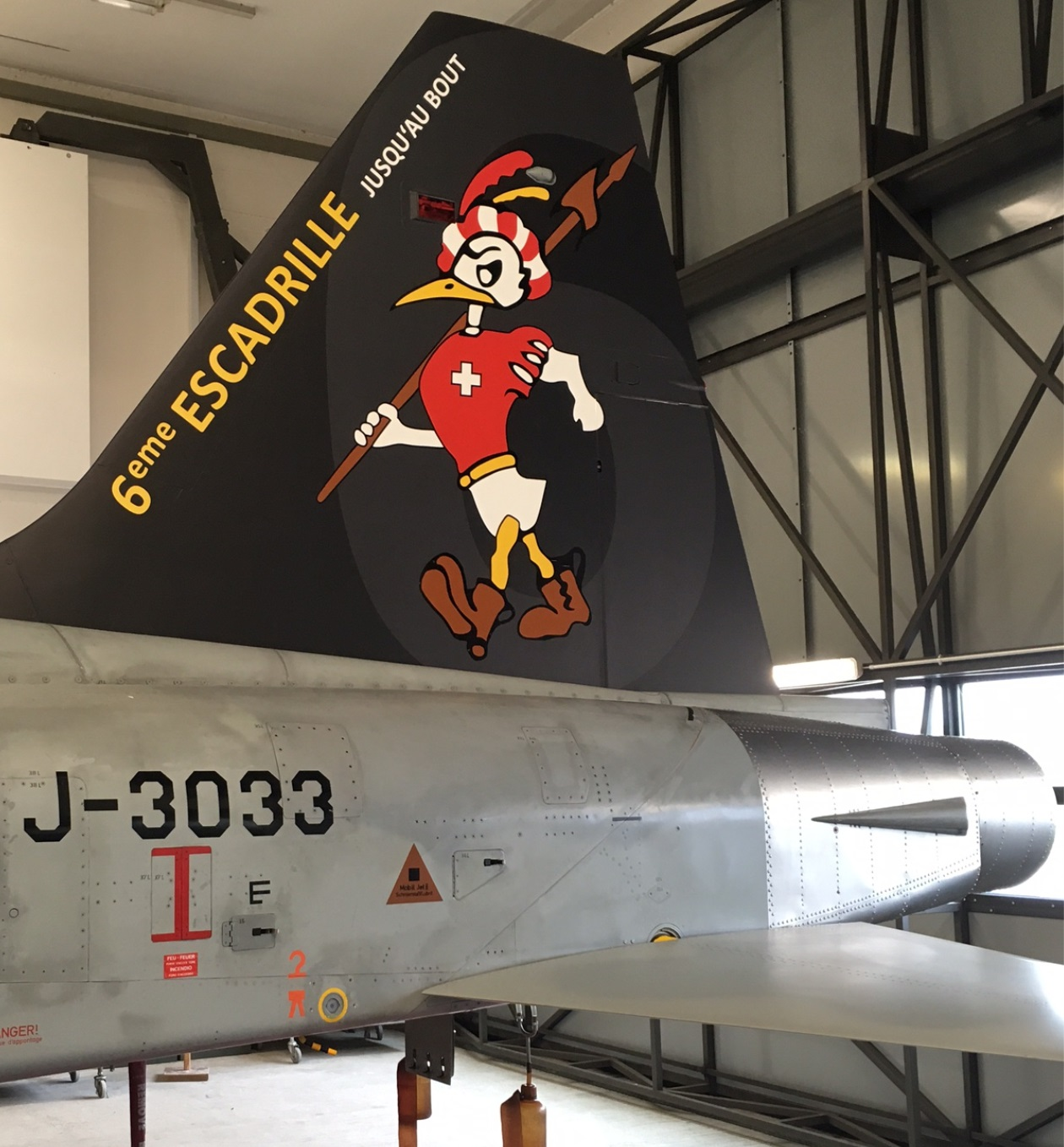
- Tail of F-5E J-3033 of Fliegerstaffel 6
- Active: 1925-2023
- Country: Switzerland
- Branch: Swiss Air Force
- Role: Fighter squadron

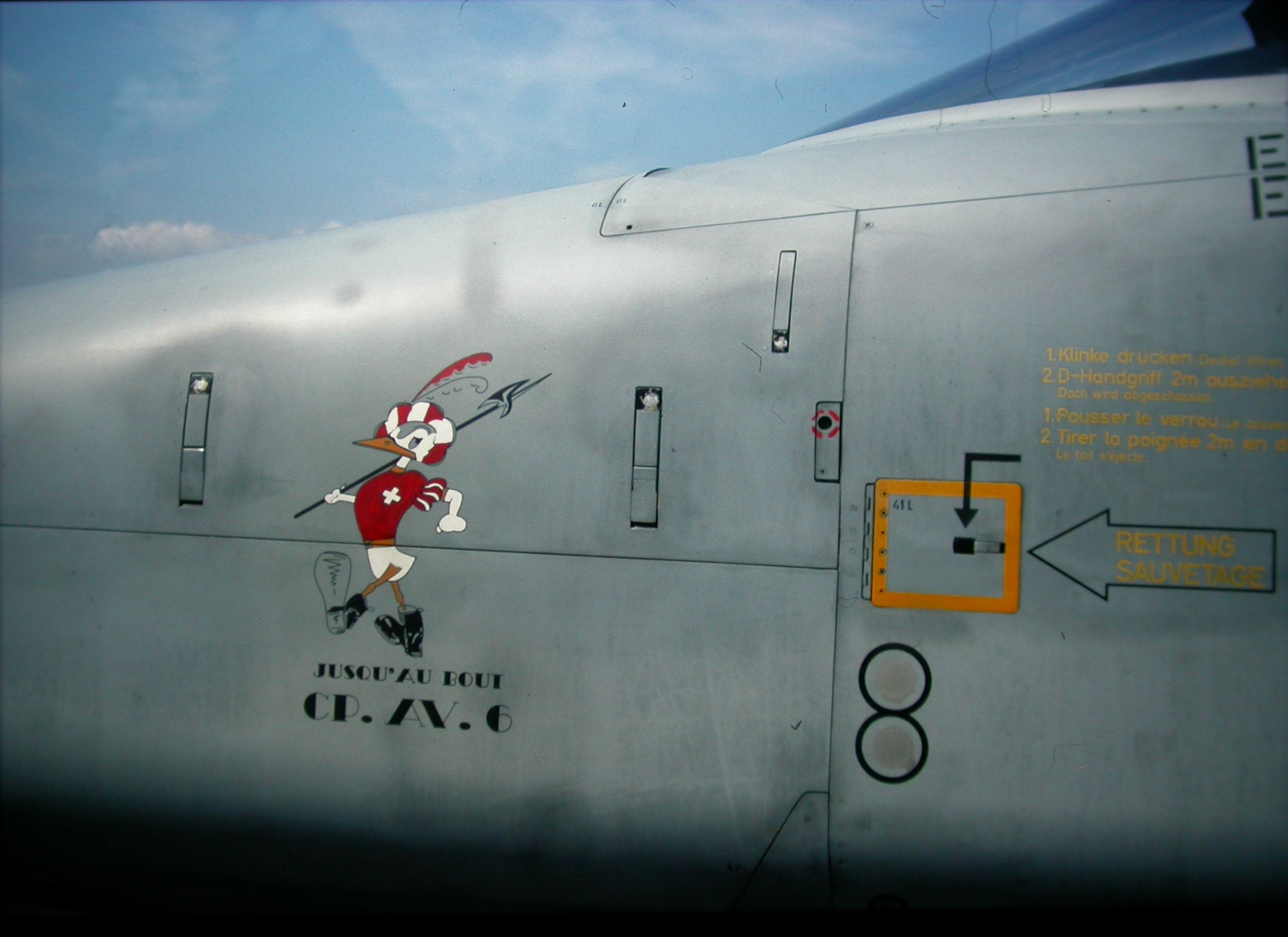
Emblem CP.AV.6 on a F-5E Tiger II

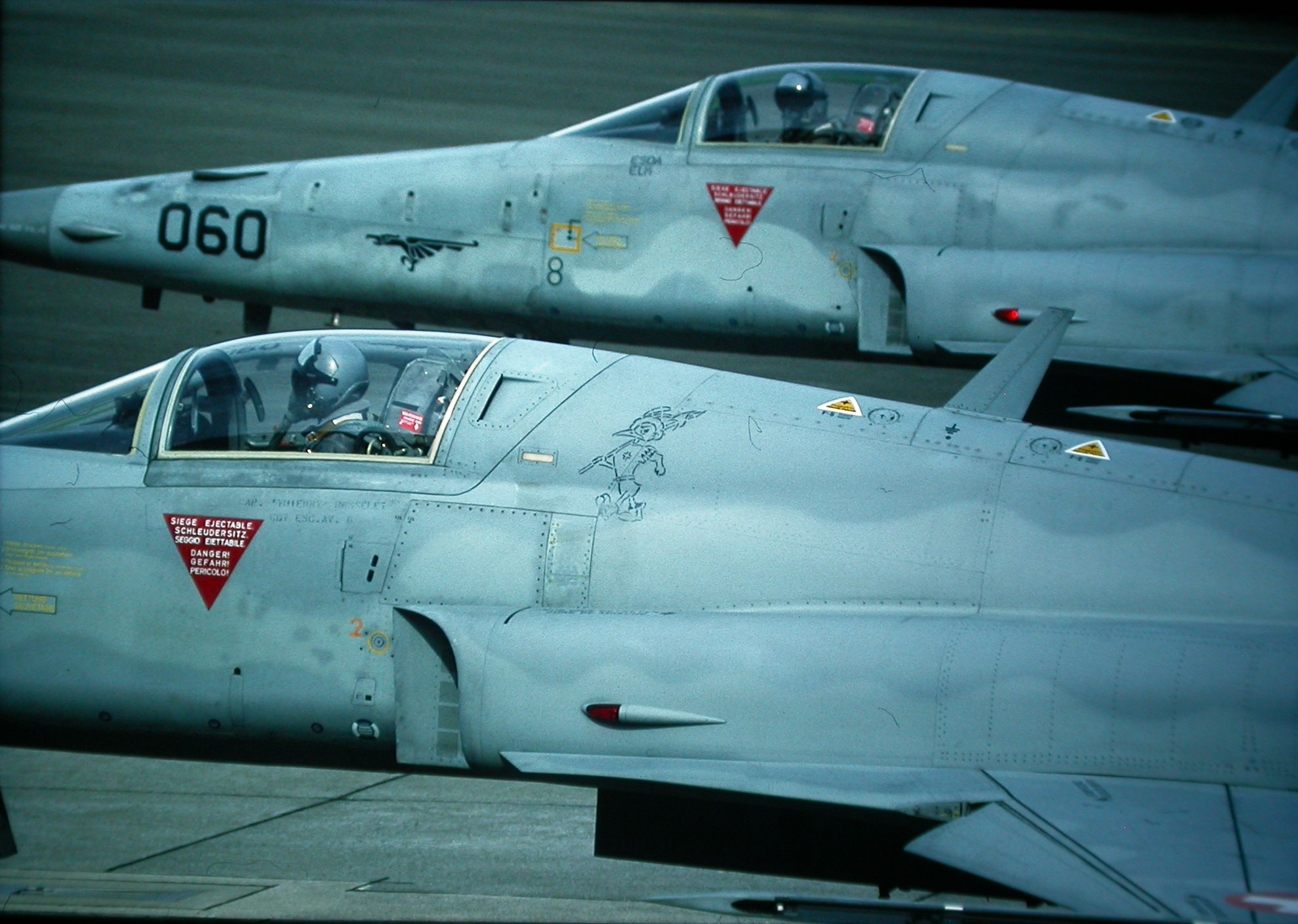
Low Visibility Emblem Fliegerstaffel 6 on the F-5E Tiger II J-3052, behind it Season 1 badge on J-3060.

The Fliegerstaffel 6 (Fightersquadron 6) of the Swiss Air Force is a militia squadron equipped with Northrop F-5E and is together with the Fliegerstaffel 18 part of the Fliegergeschwader 14. The home base of the squadron is Payerne Air Base. As coat of arms, the Fliegerstaffel 6 carried since 1940 a marching duck, with a proudly swollen breast carrying a halberd. The "Jusqu'au bout" motto means until the bitter end. Before this badge, it was first a six-pointed star with a witch on her flying broom. At the tail end of 2023 Fliegerstaffel 6 was disbanded and the remaining F5s have been integrated into the last remaining squadron (Fliegerstaffel 19) at Emmen Airbase.

== History ==
In 1925 was the founding of Fliegerstaffel 6 under the designation Fliegerkompanie 6, equipped with Dewoitine D1 +, Dewoitine D9 and the Comte AC-1. From 1939 the Fliegerstaffel 6 was in operation Dewoitine D.27. From 1939 to 1946, the Fliegerkompanie 6 used the Messerschmitt Bf 109 from the Air Base Zweisimmen. Leutnant Hans Thurnheer from the Fliegerstaffel 6 was the first Swiss combat pilots who shoot down an enemy: On May 10, 1940, he was involved in a firefight with a Heinkel He 111, who resisted following the order to land, and opened fire. After Lieutenant Thurnheer had shot the He 111, the latter left the Swiss airspace. Fliegerstaffel 6 was involved in air battles over the Jura in June 1940 and scored 2.5 confirmed killings (1.5 He 111 and one Bf 110).

In 1945, the squadron was renamed to Fliegerstaffel 6. After the Second World War, the Fliegerstaffel 6 received D-3800 and D-3801 Morane. These flew only for a short time at Fliegerstaffel 6. From 1951 on the Fliegerstaffel 6 flew with De Havilland D.H. 100 Vampire as one of the first front squadrons. The Vampires stayed at the Fliegerstaffel 6 until 1959. From 1960 to 1978, the Vampire was replaced by the successor, the De Havilland D.H. 112 Venom. In 1978 the Fliegerstaffel 6 was re-trained on the Hawker Hunter at Sion Airport.

In 1983 was the re-training on the F-5 Tiger and Payerne Air Base became the new home base of Fliegerstaffel 6. The Fliegerstaffel 6 is a militiasquadron, all pilots fulfill their military service obligation in the squadron and are otherwise active in different professions, which do not necessarily have to have a connection with the aviation. The pilots of the Fliegerstaffel 6 come from the French-speaking cantons of Switzerland. The Fliegerstaffel 6 has no aircraft specifically assigned to it and use the aircraft of the Tiger fleet like the other squadrons on availability. However, it is a F-5E Squadron / militia squadron of the Swiss Air Force, who has, with the F-5E J-3033, its own squadron aircraft with a permanent squadron painting (similar to the J-3073, J-3038, J-5011, J-5017 and J-5018 of the Fliegerstaffel 8, 11, 17 18 and 19).

The Fliegerstaffel 6 is also called "Ducks" and celebrated its 90th anniversary in 2015, and created for this birthday a special squadron badge. The air policing and the identification of foreign aircraft is nowadays a major task of the Fliegerstaffel 6. The future of the Fliegerstaffel 6 is, like for the other two F-5 squadrons, the Fliegerstaffel 19 and Fliegerstaffel 8 uncertain. It is planned to introduce a successor model for the F-5 and F /A-18 for the Swiss Air Force by 2025. It is not yet clear which squadrons will continue to exist with the new aircraft. With the procurement of modern, complex combat aircraft, it is foreseeable that they can’t be used effectively by militia pilots and only by professional military pilots.

== Aircraft ==
- Dewoitine D1+
- Dewoitine D9
- Comte AC1
- Dewoitine D.27
- Morane D-3800
- Morane D-3801
- Messerschmitt Bf 109.
- De Havilland D.H. 100
- de Havilland D.H.112 Venom
- Hawker Hunter
- Northrop F-5
