= Fliegerstaffel 19 =

Unit of Swiss Air Force

Fliegerstaffel 19 19ème Escadrille Squadriglia d'aviazione 19
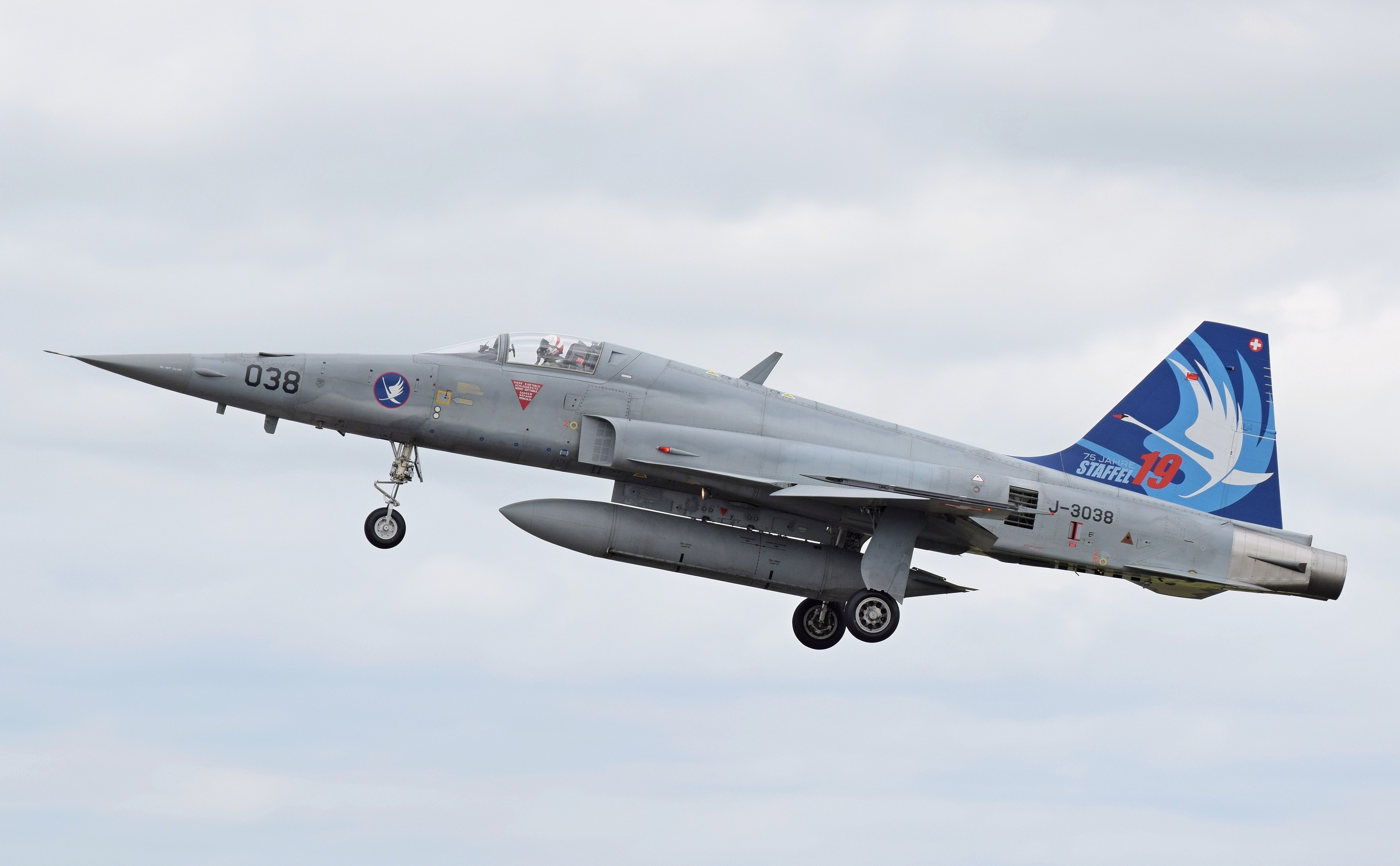
- F-5E J-3038 of Fliegerstaffel 19
- Active: 1938-today
- Country: Switzerland
- Branch: Swiss Air Force
- Role: Fighter squadron
- Garrison/HQ: Sion Airport

Fliegerstaffel 19 (No 19 squadron) of the Swiss Air Force is a militia squadron equipped with Northrop F-5E and forms together with Fliegerstaffel 18 Fliegergeschwader 14. The home base of squadron 19 is Sion Airport. The "Fliegerstaffel 19" carries as a coat of arms a stylized swan on a blue background.

== History ==
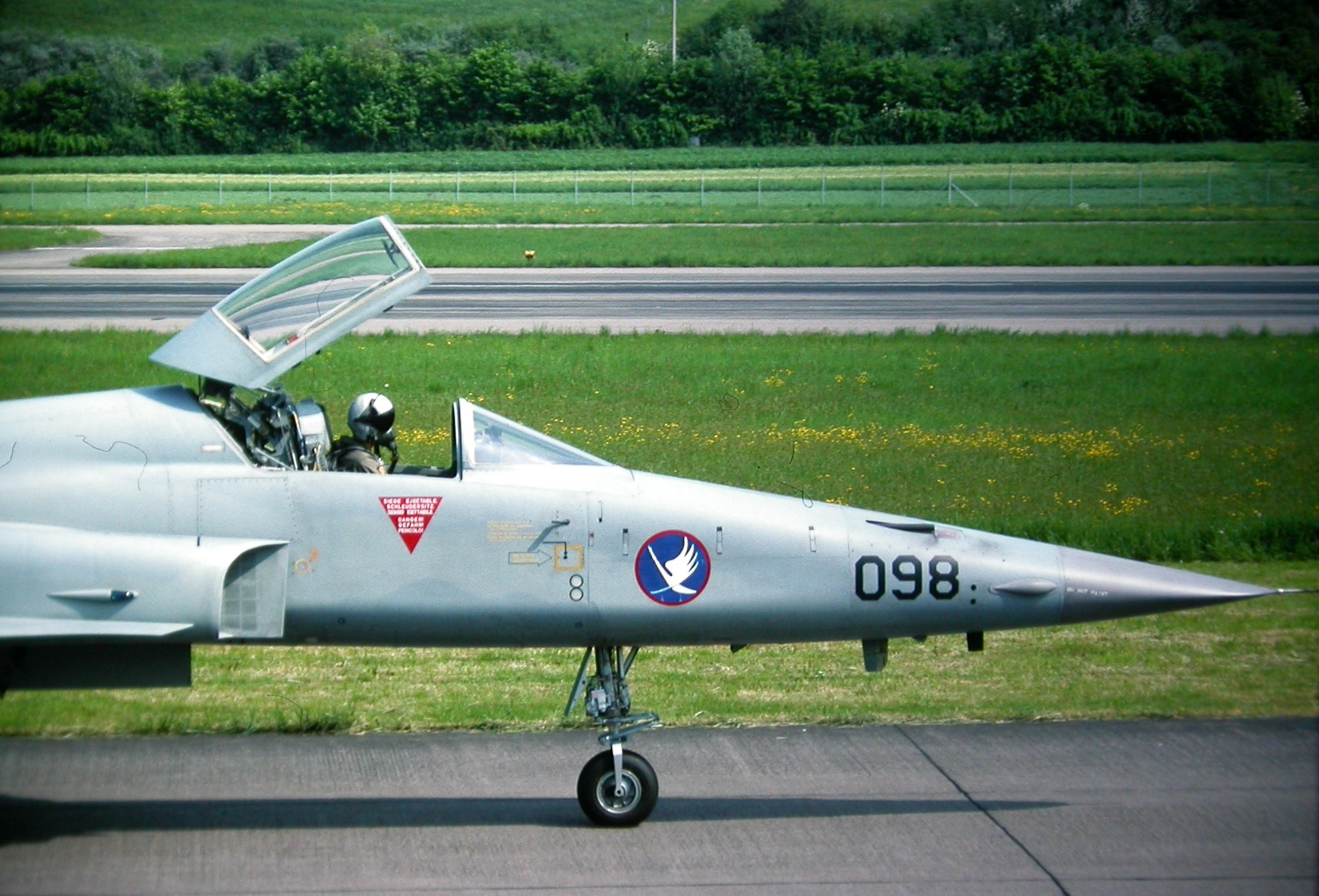
F-5E Tiger II of the Swiss Air Force with a Staffel 19 emblem.

In 1938, Fliegerkompanie 19 was founded; Its first aircraft was the Potez 25. In 1939, the Fliegerkompanie 19 received the Dewoitine D.27 aircraft from the Fliegerstaffel 21 and in 1940 the conversion to Morane D-3800 took place. The Fliegkompanie 19 was stationed in Meiringen, Dübendorf, Emmen, Thun, Kägiswil and Littau during the Second World War. At the outbreak of war, no compensation for the loss of earnings existed for militia personnel of the Forces of Switzerland and the extensive military services represented a financial problem for many members of the Swiss Military. Therefore, the Fliegerkompanie 19 issued the first soldier semi-postal stamp of the Second World War.

In 1945 the unit Fliegerstaffel 19 was formed out of the pilots of Fliegerkompanie 19. In 1947 the conversion to the P-51 Mustang and the Alpnach Air Base was expanded as a military base and became the home airport of the unit. From 1957 to 1973, the squadron operated the De Havilland D.H. 112 Venom. On September 16, 1970, for the first time Swiss Air Force combat aircraft used a Swiss motorway to land. Five pilots of the Fliegerstaffel 19 also took-off on the section of the motorway N1, which was designed for this purpose at Oensingen. In 1973 the Fliegerstaffel 19 changed to the Hawker Hunter. In 1980, the F-5 Tiger was re-trained. In 1994, Alpnach, the long-standing military base of the Fliegerstaffel 19, was closed for jet operations and the unit was moved to the military airfield Mollis. The last jet aircraft deployment with F-5E on the Mollis airfield took place in 1999. In 2000 Mollis became a helicopter base. Fliegerstaffel 19 moved to Buochs. In 2003, the Buochs Airport was downgraded to a "Sleeping Base" and the Fliegerstaffel 19 got Sion Airport as new homebase.

The Fliegerstaffel 19 has no aircraft of its own and the use of aircraft of the Tiger fleet is subject of availability. However, the unit was the first F-5E militia squadron of the Swiss Air Force, who received its own squadron aircraft with a permanent squadron painting. Since the F-5E J-3019 was no longer in the inventory of the Swiss Air Force at the time, the J-3038 was used as squadron aircraft for the "Swans". Today's tasks of the Fliegerstaffel 19 are the practice of air combat. This includes use against fourth generation combat aircraft (e.g., F/A-18 Hornet). The first priority, however, is the constant readiness for air police operations, which requires the control of the airspace and identification and interception procedures on foreign aircraft in Swiss airspace.

The future of the Fliegerstaffel 19 is uncertain, as it is for the other F-5 squadrons, which are with Fliegerstaffel 6 and Fliegerstaffel 8. The F-5 is expected to be phased out by 2025. With the procurement of modern, complex combat aircraft, it is foreseen that they can't be used effectively by militia pilots but only by professional military pilots.

== Aircraft ==
- Potez 25
- Dewoitine D.27
- Morane D-3800
- North American P-51 Mustang
- de Havilland D.H.112 Venom
- Hawker Hunter
- Northrop F-5
