= Federal Office of Civil Aviation =

Swiss civil aviation agency

- (in German) Bundesamt für Zivilluftfahrt (in French) Office fédéral de l'aviation civile (in Italian) Ufficio federale dell'aviazione civile (in Romansh) Uffizi federal d'aviatica civila

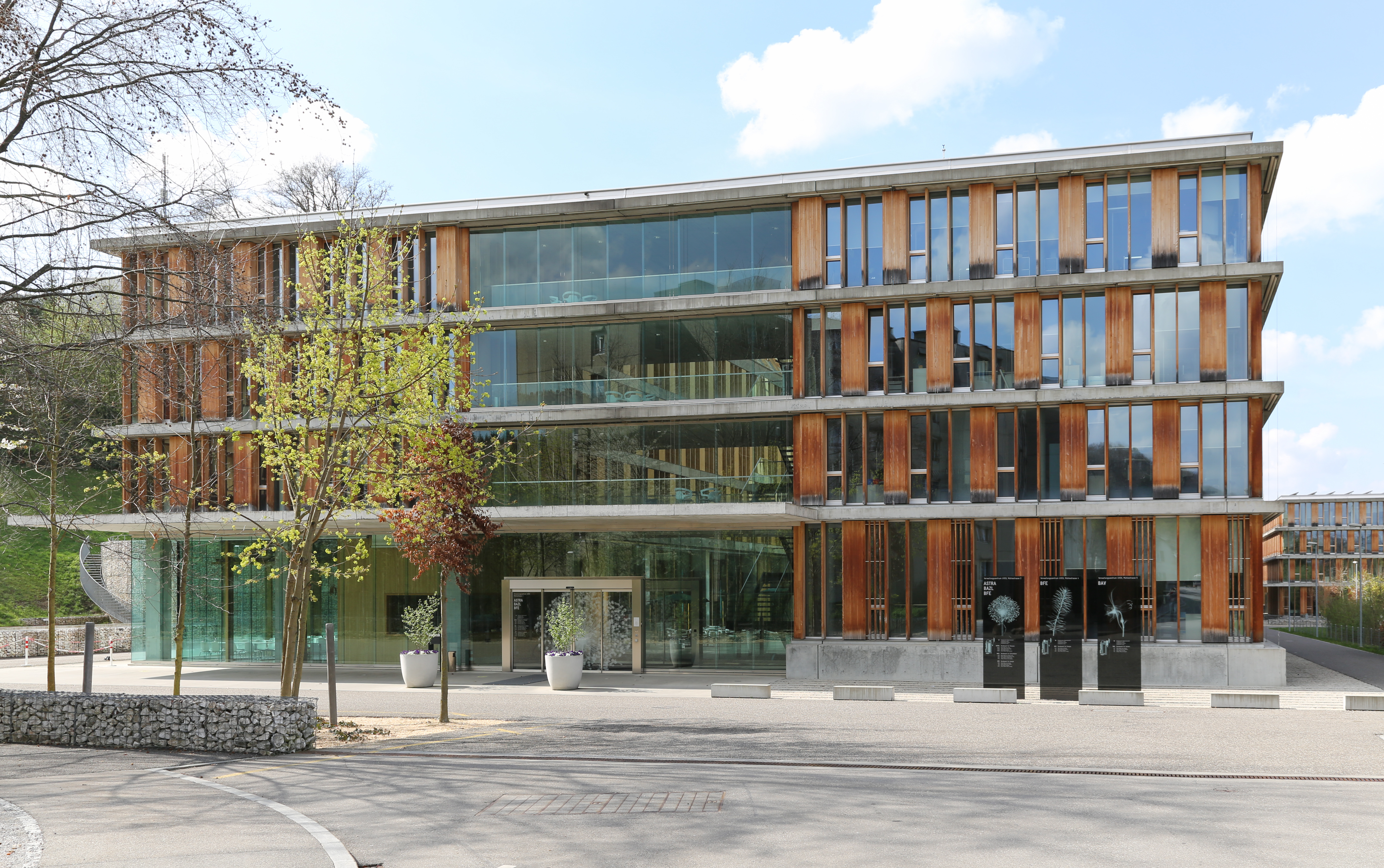
- The building of the Federal Office of Civil Aviation, the Federal Roads Office and the Federal Office of Energy (2014).

Agency overview
- Formed: 1920; 106 years ago (renamed in 1979)
- Jurisdiction: Federal administration of Switzerland
- Minister responsible: Albert Rösti, Federal Councillor
- Parent agency: Federal Department of Environment, Transport, Energy and Communications
- Website: www.bazl.admin.ch

The Federal Office of Civil Aviation (FOCA) (Note: German: Bundesamt für Zivilluftfahrt; French: Office fédéral de l'aviation civile; Italian: Ufficio federale dell'aviazione civile) is the Swiss civil aviation agency, a division of the Federal Department of Environment, Transport, Energy and Communications. Its head office is in Bern, and it has an office at Zurich Airport.

It is within the Federal Department of Environment, Transport, Energy and Communications responsible for the regulation and oversight of civil aviation. This includes personnel (air traffic controllers and pilots, among others), aircraft (including hot air balloons) and infrastructure (mainly airports).

In addition, FOCA supports the international contacts of Switzerland in the field of aviation, such as the numerous air services agreements with other states. The FOCA also issues permits for hazardous shipments by air, this concerns mainly chemical hazardous substances such as ammunition, as well as biological or radioactive cargo. These authorizations are communicated to the Swiss Air Force which then monitors the corresponding flight in Swiss airspace with the FLORAKO air surveillance system. FOCA is also the contact point for the embassies of other nations, if they want to use Swiss airspace with a State aircraft. The Air Force modified all-diplomatic clearance requests that are filed outside the opening times of the FOCA.

In 2004 FOCA had a budget of 75 million Swiss francs and had 194 employees. The headquarters of the FOCA is located together with the Federal Office of Transport, Federal Office of Energy, and the Federal Roads in the Federal Department of Environment, Transport, Energy and Communications building in the Bern suburb of Ittigen.

== Aircraft of FOCA ==
FOCA operates the federal government fleet of civil aircraft, based at Bern Airport.

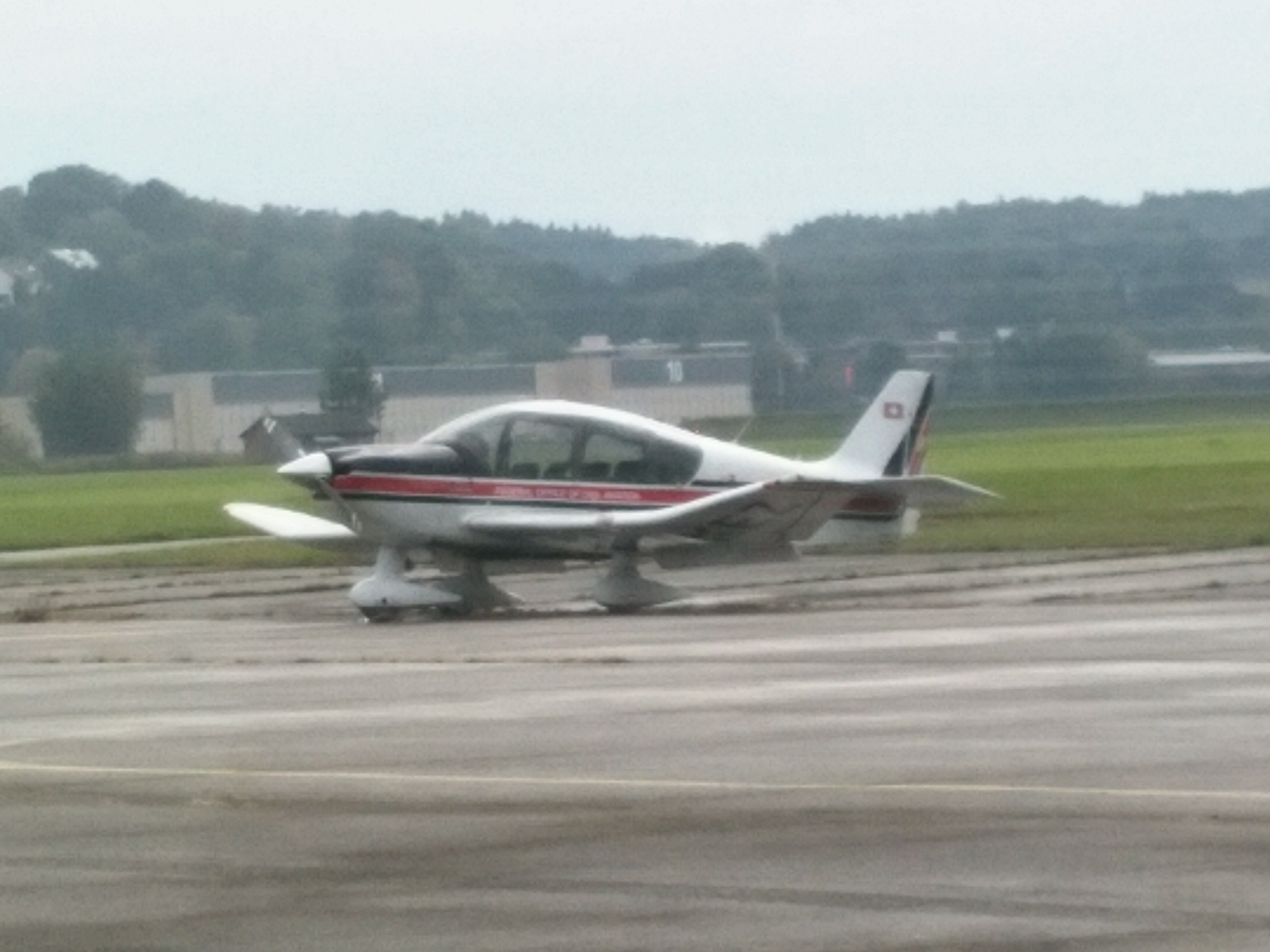
HB-KEZ Aircraft of FOCA

- 1 Beechcraft Baron 58
- 2 Robin DR 400 /500
- 1 Beechcraft Bonanza A36
- 1 Agusta A109E
- 1 Eurocopter AS 350B2
- 1 Agusta A119
- 1 Pilatus PC-12

In order to maintain independence in investigations relating to incidents in the aviation sector, the Air Accident Investigation Bureau is not part of FOCA. In November 2011 the Bureau of Aircraft Accidents Investigation (BFU) and the investigative body for trains and ships (UUS) were merged, forming the Swiss Accident Investigation Branch (SUST). FOCA operates the aircraft of SUST, based at Payerne Airport.

- 1 Agusta A109K
- 1 Agusta A109SP

=== Former Aircraft ===
- FOCA
  - HB-POP Piper PA-46 - 350P Malibu Mirage 2017 sold
  - HB-FAO Pilatus PC-6 from 1963 to 1966. This is the second prototype of the PC-6, which was damaged on 2 June 1966 and repaired by the Pilatus Aircraft and converted to PC-6/H2 was sold to the Swiss Agency for Development and Cooperation.
  - HB-XCN Sud-Aviation SA.318C Alouette II in service from 1968 until the crash on 28 September 1992 in Arth-Goldau.
  - HB-XDE Aérospatiale Alouette III in the service from 1970 until its crash on 13 October 1998 near the Blinnenhorn.
  - HB-XZM Aérospatiale Alouette III, Swiss Air Force helicopter (V-276), as HB-XZM between 1 June and 30 October 1993 at the FOCA during the full revision of HB- XDE.
  - HB-ZBL Aérospatiale Alouette III, former Helicopter of the Swiss Air Force (V-279), used between 1999 and 2005, afterwards used as a spare part dispenser.
  - HB-XQE Agusta A109 E, from 1998 to 2016 on duty, afterwards sold.
- SUST
  - HB-XWC Agusta A109 K, purchased from the REGA in 2004, and sold in 2013

=== Other civilian state aircraft in Switzerland ===
- HB-KMO Cirrus SR22
- HB-KMP Cirrus SR22
- HB-LZH Diamond DA42
- HB-EHJ Fieseler Fi 156 Zentralstelle für Historisches Armeematerial/ Center for Historical Armaments
- HB-1700 Schleicher ASK 21
- HB-ZSN Eurocopter AS 350
- HB-ZSO Eurocopter AS 350

== Full-time positions since 2001 ==
Raw data

"Federal Finance Administration FFA: State financial statements".
"Federal Finance Administration FFA: Data portal".

== See also ==
- Skyguide
