= Fliegerstaffel 8 =

Fliegerstaffel 8 8ème Escadrille Squadriglia d'aviazione 8
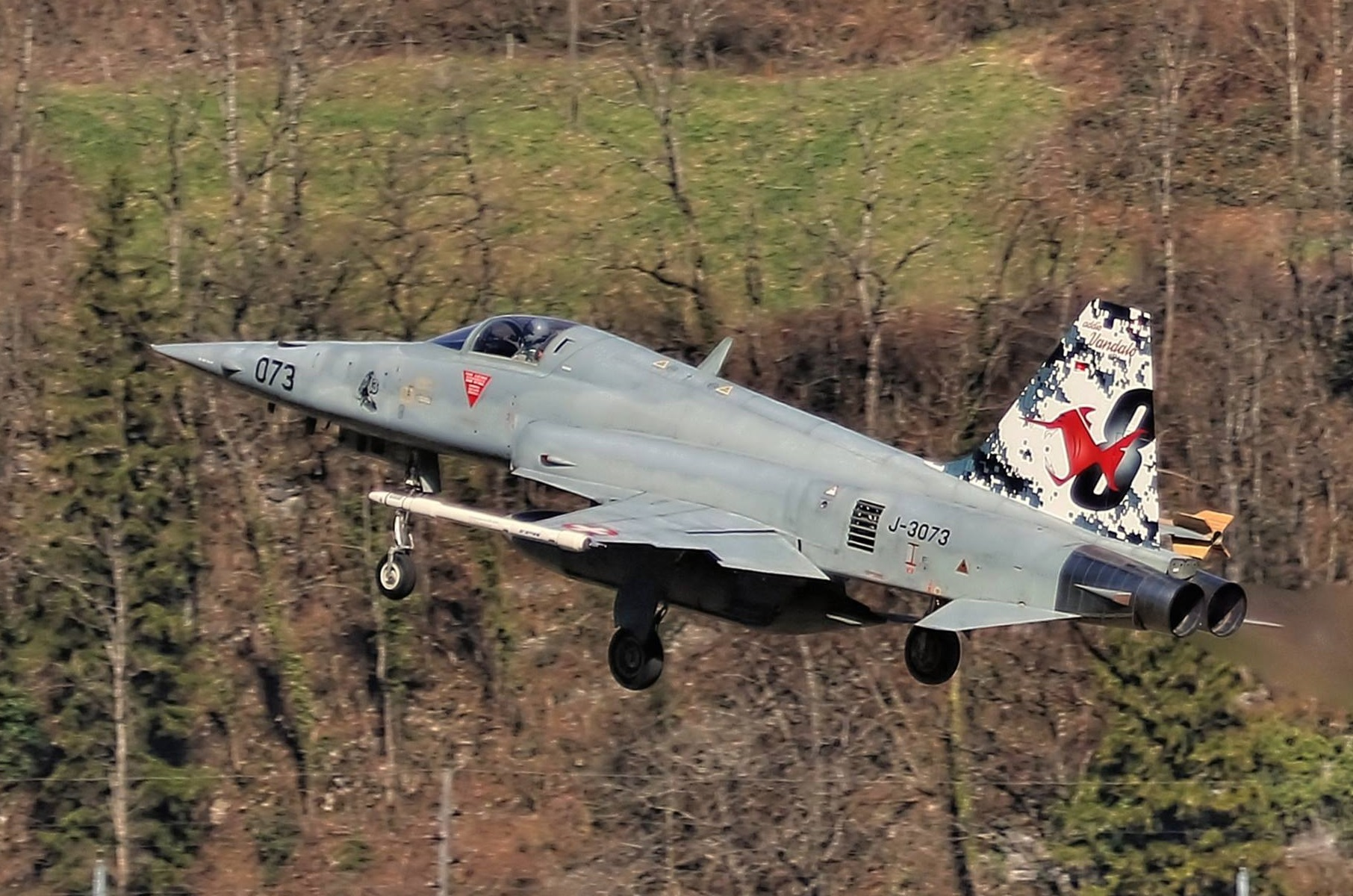
- F-5E J-3070 of Fliegerstaffel 8
- Active: 1925-today
- Country: Switzerland
- Branch: Swiss Air Force
- Role: Fighter squadron
- Garrison/HQ: Meiringen Air Base

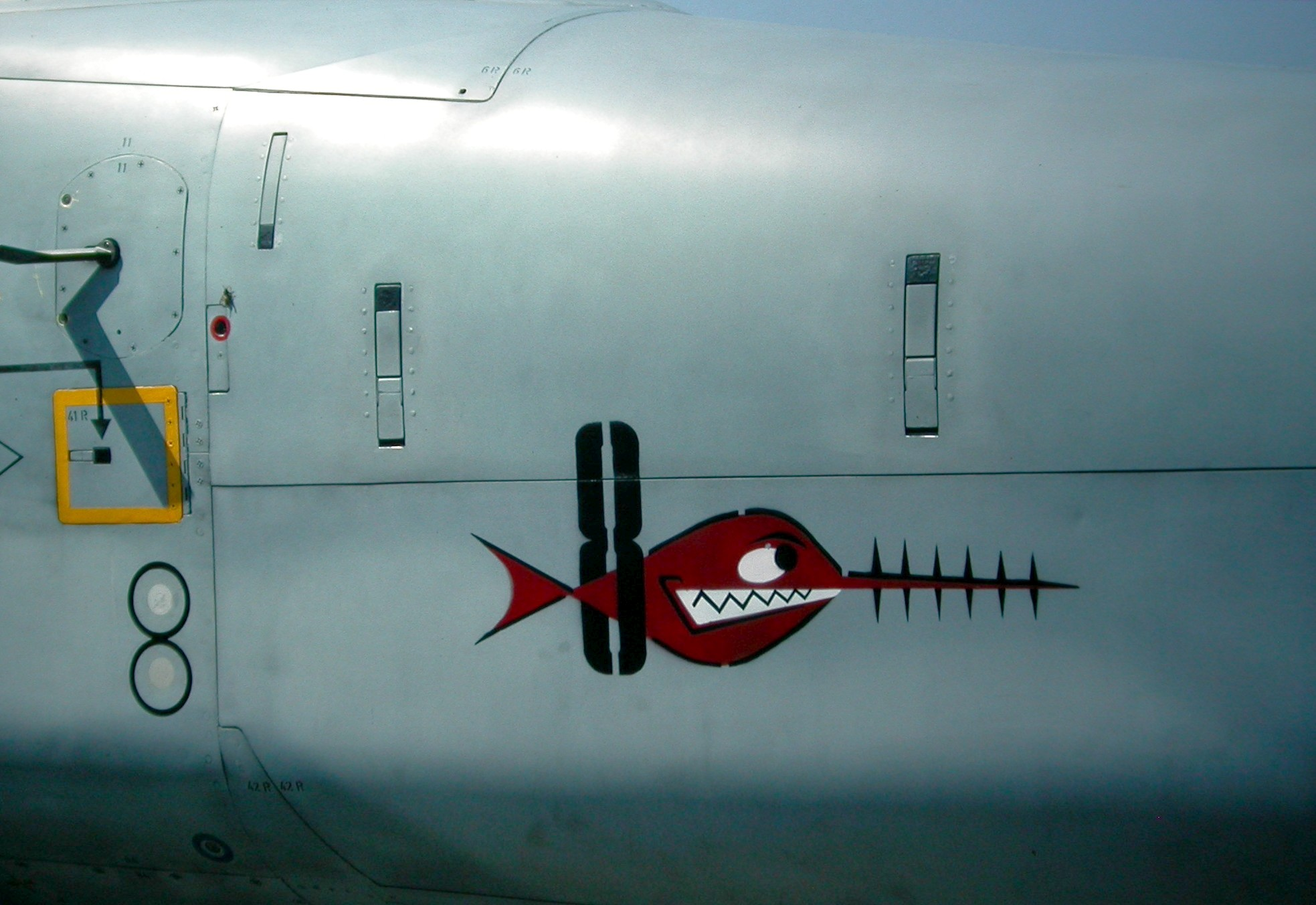
Fliegerstaffel 8 Badge on F-5E Tiger II J-3070

Fliegerstaffel 8 «Vandalos» is a Swiss Air Force militia squadron, equipped with Northrop F-5E and forms Fliegergeschwader 13 with Fliegerstaffel 11. The home base of the unit is Meiringen Air Base. As coat of arms, the Fliegerstaffel 8 carries as a red sawfish, floating through the lower opening of a black number 8 on a white ground. The sawfish is called Vandalo.

== History ==
In 1925, Fliegerkompanie 8 was founded. Their first aircraft were Häfeli DH-3 until 1933 and Häfeli DH-5 from 1926 to 1934. From 1934 to 1940, the unit used Fokker CV and the EKW C-35 for reconnaissance and air to ground missions. From 1940 to 1949 the Messerschmitt Bf 109 E was used. In 1945, Fliegerstaffel 8 was created out of the pilots within Fliegerkompanie 8. The squadron was equipped with De Havilland DH-100 Vampire from 1950 to 1959. In the fall of 1956, Fl St 8 completed a training course at Meiringen, flying their first missions out of Aircraft caverns. During the retraining phase on the Hawker Hunter in Emmen and the following services, Oblt Paul Habegger shot an 8-mm film named "Bambini Vandalo". The film documents the work of the pilots of a Hunter squadron in the sixties. From 1959 to 1975 the flight operation with Hawker Hunter took place from Meiringen Air Base, from 1976 until 1980 from Alpnach Air Base. Since 1980, the squadron has his home base at the Meiringen Air Base. During the planned dismantling of the Hunter fleet, two Tiger squadrons should be re-trained for ground combat in a second role. In addition to the professional pilots Fliegerstaffel 1, the militia Fliegerstaffel 8 was selected for this task but cancelled shortly later. In 1993, the first F-5E Tiger with the tailnumber J-3088 (now wearing the colors of the Patrouille Suisse) received the Fliegerstaffel 8 badge. Like all Swiss squadrons, however, the Fliegerstaffel 8 does not have any aircraft specifically assigned to it. However, as a militia squadron of the Swiss Air Force, it has, with the F-5E J-3073, an aircraft with a permanent squadron painting.

Air policing and identification of foreign aircraft became a major task of the Fliegerstaffel 8. The future of the Fliegerstaffel 8 is, like for the other two F-5 squadrons, the Fliegerstaffel 19 and Fliegerstaffel 6 uncertain. This is because the F-5 is expected to be phased out in 2018. It is planned to introduce a successor model for the F-5 and F /A-18 for the Swiss Air Force by 2025. It is not yet clear which squadrons will continue. With the procurement of modern, complex combat aircraft, it is foreseeable that they can't be used effectively by non-professional militia pilots.

== Aircraft ==
- Häfeli DH-3
- Häfeli DH-5
- Fokker C.V
- EKW C-35
- Messerschmitt Bf 109
- De Havilland D.H. 100
- Hawker Hunter
- Northrop F-5
