= Payerne Air Base =

Payerne Air Base Aérodrome de Payerne
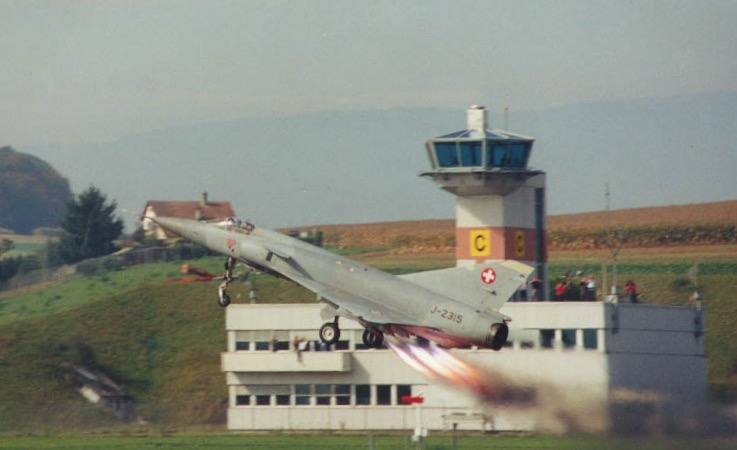
- A MirageIIIS taking off with JATO rockets in front of the tower at Payerne in 1996
- IATA: VIP; ICAO: LSMP

Summary
- Airport type: Military
- Operator: Swiss Air Force
- Serves: Payerne
- Occupants: Swiss Accident Investigation Board (formerly the Aircraft Accident Investigation Bureau)
- Elevation AMSL: 445 m (1,460 ft)
- Coordinates: 46°50′36″N 6°54′54″E

Map
- Location in Switzerland
- Sources: GCM,

Payerne Air Base (IATA: VIP, ICAO: LSMP) is a military airfield of the Swiss Air Force north of Payerne in Switzerland, located approximately halfway between Lausanne and Bern.

== History ==
In 2004 the International Air Show Air04 was held at Payerne.

On 8 July 2010, Payerne Air Base was the location from which the long-range experimental solar-powered aircraft Solar Impulse 1 achieved the world's first crewed 26-hour solar-powered flight. Payerne also became the home base for the successor Solar Impulse 2 (HB-SIB) aircraft, with the aircraft's first flight made from Payerne on 2 June 2014.

From 30 August 2014 to 7 September 2014 the International Airshow Air14 took place at Payerne AFB.

== Today ==
Payerne AB is the home of the F/A-18 Hornet squadrons Fliegerstaffel 17 Falcons and Fliegerstaffel 18 Panthers, the militia F-5E Tiger II squadron Fliegerstaffel 6 Ducks and of the transport squadron Lufttransportstaffel 1. Every aircraft type of the Swiss Air Force can be seen operating from Payerne.

It is home to the air investigation division of the Swiss Transportation Safety Investigation Board (STSB, formerly the Swiss Accident Investigation Board or SAIB). Previously this was the head office of the Aircraft Accident Investigation Bureau, before its 2011 merger into the SAIB.

Payerne operates also as alternate airport for Bern-Belp airport for foreign government flights. Located on Payerne AB is also the Military Aviation Museum, Clin d'Ailes. Air Traffic Control is provided by the military branch of Skyguide, Skyguide National. Payerne is responsible for the education of ground crews (e.g., aircraft mechanic, airport fire fighter) of the Swiss Air Force. Therefore, Payerne is also the main base of the F/A-18C Mock-up X-5098. The F/A-18 flight simulators are also located in Payerne.

The A1 motorway (Switzerland) is connected via a taxiway at the hangar 5 with the airfield and can, if necessary, be used as runway for take off - and landing. However, this possibility has never been exploited since the construction of the highway. The air base is, at both end of the runway, equipped with retractable arresting gear devices (used by the F/A-18 and in case of a problem by the F-5). Payerne AB is home of the Quick Reaction Alert / air policing activities of the Swiss Air Force.

Inaugurated in 2019 at Payerne Airport, the company Speedwings Business SA provides VIP handling services for Business Aviation flights for which there is a dedicated apron. Speedwings Business SA runs handling facilities including 6'600 sqm of heated hangars. Within 4 years after opening, more than 250 business jets operators already flew in, reaching Payerne Airport non stop with 400+ cities in 63 countries on 4 continents. The 2'800m long runway permits long haul fligths to be carried out from Payerne Airport. Flights to/from US West Coast, South America, Far East and Indian Ocean have already been performed

The Aviatic Museum Clin d'Ailes offers private flights with the Hawker Hunter trainer J-4203 HB-RVW and the Dassault Mirage IIIDS J-2012 HB-RDF from Payerne.

== See also ==
- Solar Impulse
- Swiss Transportation Safety Investigation Board (its Aviation Division is located at the Payerne Air Base)
- Military significance of motorways in Switzerland
