= Meiringen Air Base =

Swiss military airport

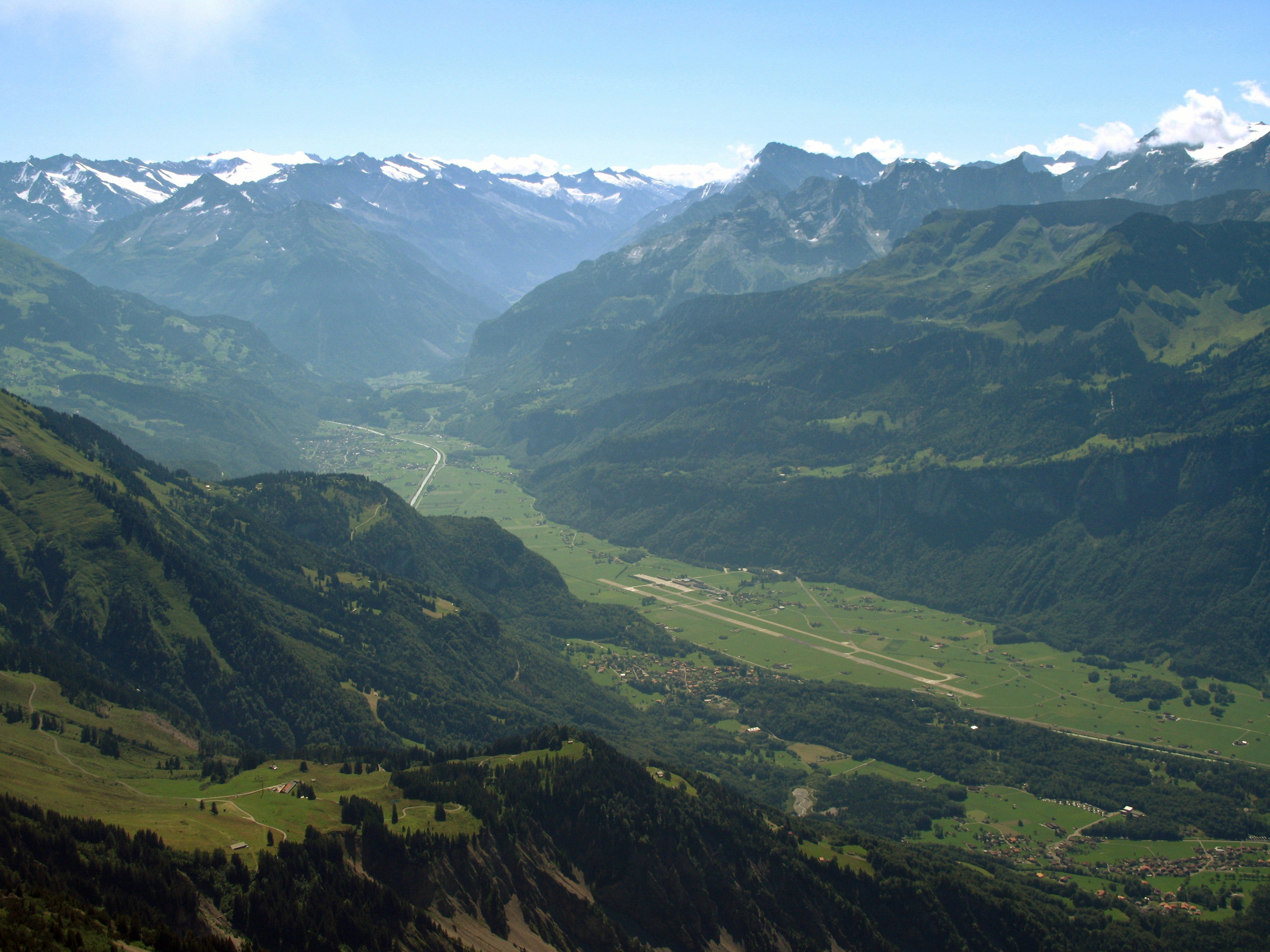
- Meiringen air base viewed from the Rothorn
- IATA: none; ICAO: LSMM

Summary
- Airport type: Military
- Serves: Meiringen
- Occupants: Swiss Air Force
- Elevation AMSL: 578 m / 1,896 ft
- Coordinates: 46°44′25″N 8°6′36″E

Map
- Location in Switzerland

Meiringen Air Base, also known as the Unterbach Military Airfield, is a Swiss military airbase located near the hamlet of Unterbach and the town of Meiringen, in the canton of Bern. It is one of three main airbases of the Swiss Air Force.

The airfield is situated in the steep-sided alpine valley of the Aar river, with its single runway parallel to the river. It is flanked to the north by the main road to Meiringen, the river, and the Brünig railway line. To the south, taxiways connect the airfield to aircraft caverns built within the valley side.

== History ==
Meiringen Air Base started operations on 1 December 1941. The base played an important role in the 1946 C-53 Skytrooper crash on the Gauli Glacier: the rescue operation was launched and coordinated by the Meiringen air base. The rescue of persons on a glacier with airplanes had never been done before. After World War II, an aircraft cavern was built in Meiringen. In the 1970 years the construction of another cavern tunnel was started for the A-7G Corsair II, but because the A-7G was not bought, this construction was completed as an ammunition storage cavern. With the introduction of the F/A-18 Hornet the aircraft cavern was rebuilt again and received another tunnel so the aircraft can go straight in and out at the same time. In the inside maneuvering without crane is now possible.

In 2004, militia Squadron 8 "Destructors", equipped with the F-5E Tiger, moved to Meiringen from Buochs Airport. In 2007, professional Fliegerstaffel 11 (Fighter Squadron 11) "Tigers", equipped with the F/A-18, moved from Dübendorf Air Base.

== Today ==
The airfield of Meiringen is still important for the Swiss Air Force. With the closure of Sion Air Base in 2016, it will be one of only three fighter bases, along with Payerne Air Base and Emmen Air Base. It is the home base of two fighter squadrons, militia Squadron 8 "Destructors", equipped with the Northrop F-5E Tiger, and Berufsfliegerkorps (professional) Fliegerstaffel 11, equipped with the F/A-18 Hornet.

Meiringen is the only Swiss airbase that uses an aircraft cavern in daily operations. The runway is equipped with retractable arresting gear devices (used by the F/A-18 and in emergencies by the F-5) at both ends.

For the region and the town of Meiringen, the operation of the aerodrome has both positive and negative effects; noise emissions by the military jets are a point of concern for the affected population, as well as for tourism businesses. The airfield is, however, with some 190 labor and 25 training places, an important economic factor for the region. The airfield has a small museum that is open on Wednesday afternoons from May to October; different pieces of equipment are exhibited as well as an Aérospatiale Alouette III and an F-5 Tiger.

In 2023, a private inn overlooking the air base was raided by the authorities on suspicions of harboring a Chinese intelligence operation.
