= Skyguide =

Swiss Air Navigation Services

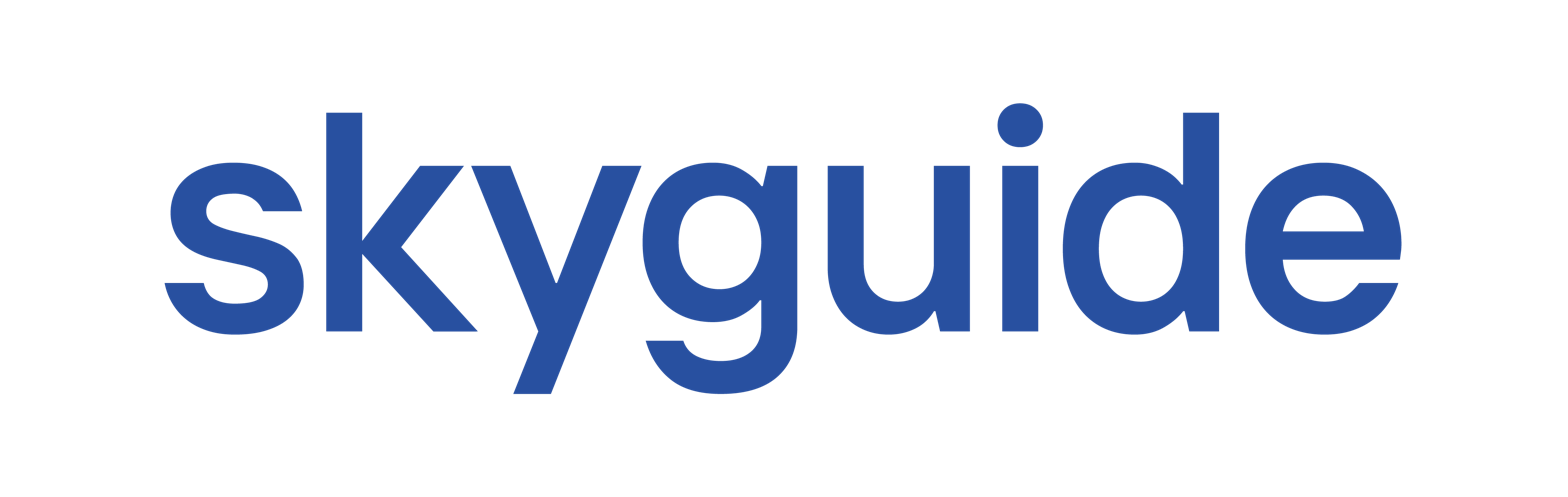
Skyguide Logo

Skyguide (Swiss Air Navigation Services Ltd.; stylised in all lower-case) is an air navigation service provider which manages and monitors Swiss airspace. The company, which was formerly known as Swisscontrol, changed its name to Skyguide in 2001. Skyguide is a joint-stock company under Swiss private law which is responsible, on behalf of the Swiss Confederation, for ensuring the safety of all Swiss airspace and of adjoining airspace areas in Germany, Austria, France and Italy that have been delegated to its control. For Swiss airspace, this duty extends to both civil and military air navigation services.

Skyguide is subject to the supervisory authority of the Swiss Federal Department of the Environment, Transport, Energy and Communications (DETEC). Its principal shareholder is the Swiss Confederation, which holds 99.91% of its share capital. The company employs some 1,500 people, around two-thirds of them in the provision of air navigation services, a quarter in technical services and the rest mainly in administration. Alex Bristol, the current CEO, assumed his duties on 1 July 2017. Skyguide is headquartered in Meyrin, near Geneva Airport.

== Skyguide in figures ==
Skyguide managed some 1,198,663 instrument flight rules (IFR) flights through its airspace in 2016 – an average of around 3,285 flights a day – and generated total annual operating revenue of over CHF 455 million. Switzerland's air navigation service provider currently employs some 1,500 personnel spread over 14 locations throughout the country. Two-thirds of them are in air navigation services, around a quarter are in technical functions, and most of the rest hold administrative positions.

== Military tasks ==
Skyguide's most important partners are the Swiss Air Force. Switzerland's air policing and defence are the responsibility of the Swiss Air Force, which, with its primary radars, can also detect flying objects not emitting a transponder signal. Skyguide is unusual, however, in that in addition to its civil air traffic management role, the company also provides Switzerland's military air navigation services.

Skyguide's military controllers have all completed their basic civil air traffic controller training. In addition, these controllers will also have had additional training for military airport operations or in tactical fighter control. Normally, they work as civilian employees alongside military personnel; but if required (e.g. for the annual World Economic Forum in Davos), they will perform duties within the military operation.

Skyguide manages Swiss airspace dynamically together with the Swiss Air Force according to current military or civil needs. In some cases, Skyguide's military controllers may also guide fighters in the so-called "cross-border areas" in France or Italy. So military airspace may also extend beyond national borders and be used by the air forces of the two countries concerned.

== Locations ==
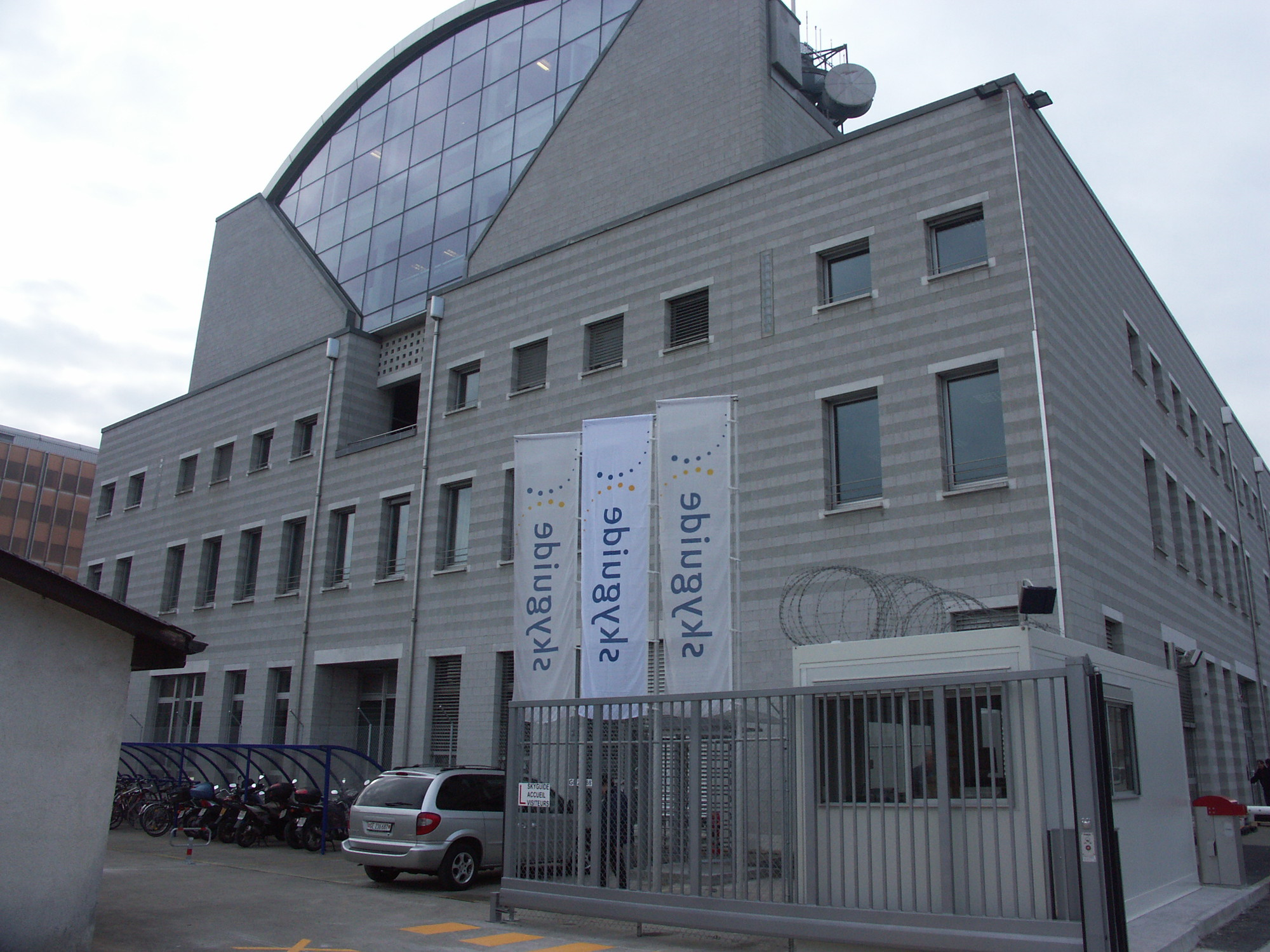
Skyguide HQ Geneva

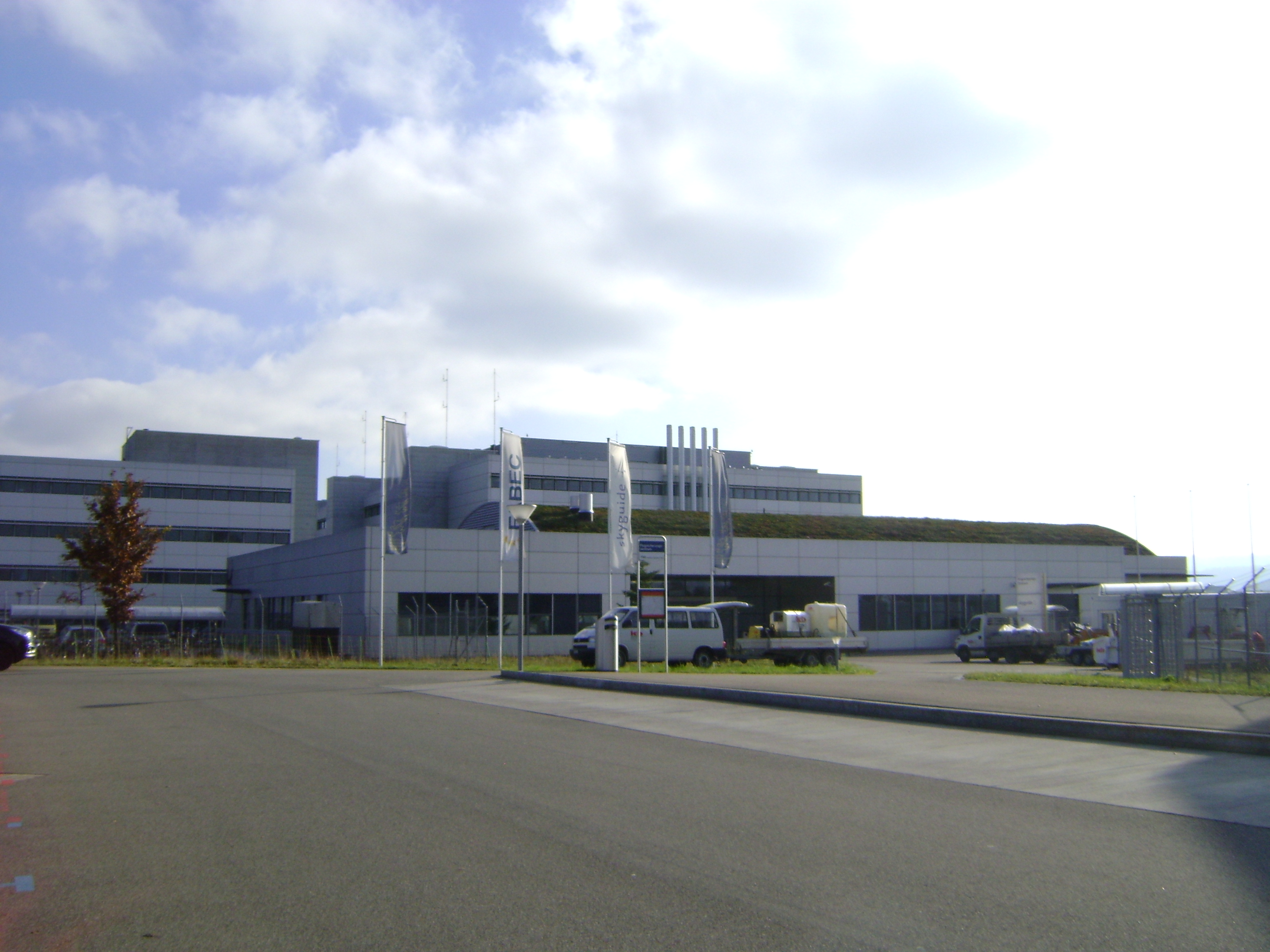
Skyguide Air Traffic Control Center &Air Force HQ at Wangen

Skyguide's main operating locations are its two operations centres, one next to Dübendorf Air Force Base in Wangen-Brüttisellen (near Zurich) and the other near Geneva Airport at Meyrin. The latter is also home to the company's administrative head office. The Wangen centre came into operation in February 2009. The centre is responsible for the airspace above German-speaking Switzerland, Liechtenstein, Western Austria and parts of Southern Germany. It is also home to the company's Aeronautical Information Services and to the Skyguide Training Center, which has two tower simulators and further facilities for the real-time training of air traffic controllers and other air navigation services personnel for both skyguide and foreign air navigation service providers. The premises also accommodate the peacetime operations centre and air surveillance center of the Swiss Air Force.

Skyguide's Geneva centre is responsible for Western Swiss airspace, the airspace above the French Alps and part of Italian airspace on the border with France.

Skyguide maintains further operations at Bern (Belp), Buochs, Grenchen, Lugano (Agno) and St. Gallen-Altenrhein regional airports and at numerous all-military or joint civil/military airfields. These include Alpnach, Dübendorf, Emmen, Locarno, Meiringen, Payerne and Sion. At Les Eplatures regional airport, the air traffic services have been delegated to the airport operator.

=== Radar stations ===
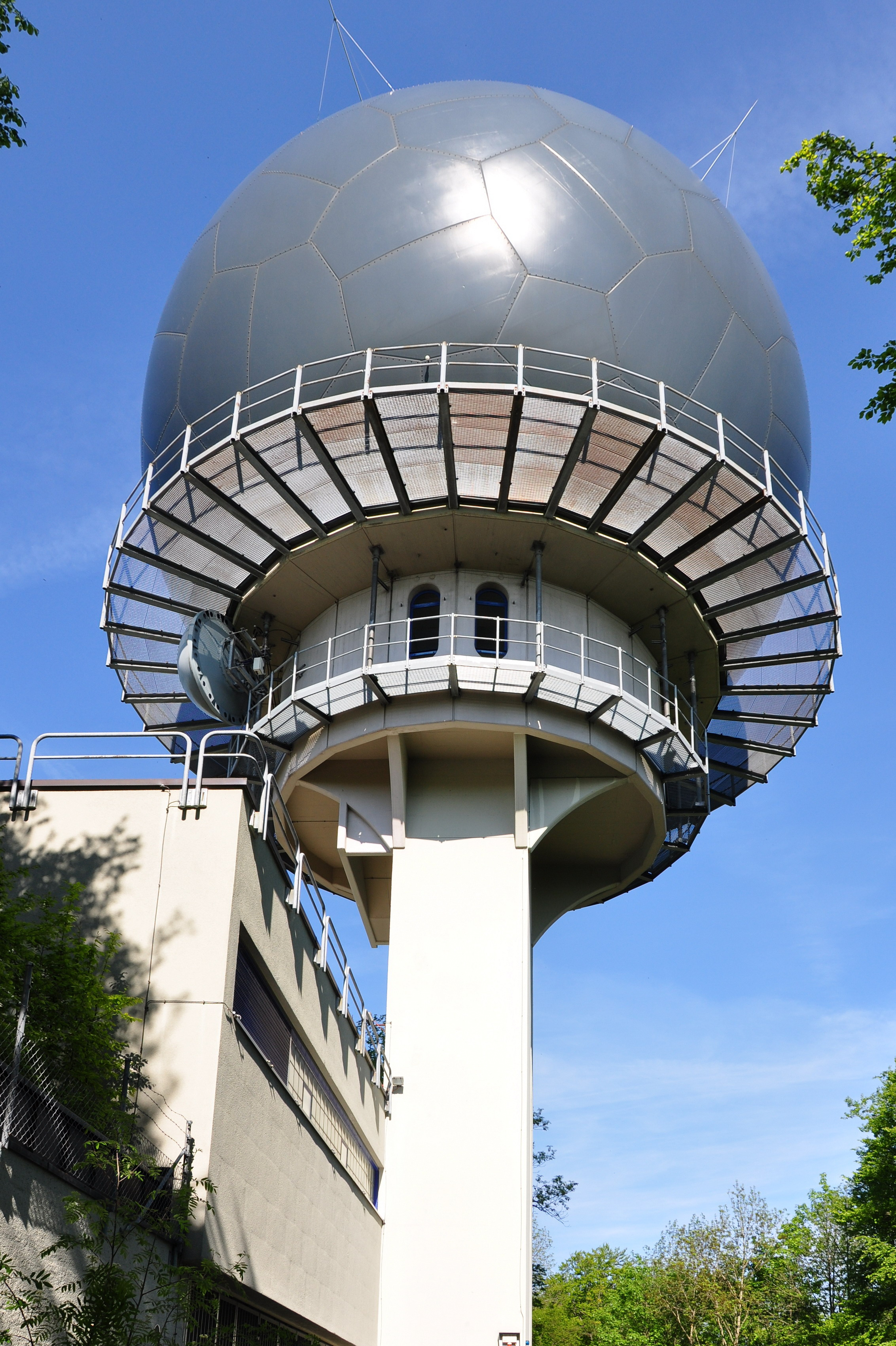
Radar on Lägern near Boppelsen

Skyguide uses nine radar stations for civil air traffic control:

- Two own wide-ranging secondary radar stations also referred to as «en route»- radar stations, with locations above the Zurich community Boppelsen on the Jura hillside Lägern and on the La Dôle
- Wide-ranging secondary radar dates from the Swiss Air Force FLORAKO radar ("TG") in Ticino on Mt. Scopi
- Two own combined primary and secondary radar, also referred to as «Approach» radar stations, at the airports of Geneva (in Cointrin) and Zurich (on the Klotener Holberg) for landing and take-off guidance.
- Four foreign radar stations to complete the national radar coverage in Switzerland and to provide air traffic to neighboring air traffic controllers with locations in Cirfontaine and Nevers (France), Gosheim (Germany) and Monte Lesima (Italy).

== Collaborations in Europe ==
Skyguide's partners are the International Civil Aviation Organization (ICAO), Eurocontrol (Europe's umbrella air navigation services organization) and the Civil Air Navigation Services Organisation (CANSO).

Europe's airspace is highly fragmented today. The Single European Sky (SES) project of the European Commission is intended to harmonize the continent's air traffic management systems and, in doing so, enhance the efficiency of the overall airspace structure. And one prerequisite for this – in addition to tailoring airways more closely to users' requirements rather than basing them on national borders – is the creation of a series of large integrated airspace blocks.

Skyguide is a member of Functional Airspace Block Europe Central (FABEC), which controls some 55% of all the air traffic handled in Europe, or around 5.3 million flights a year. The six FABEC member states – Belgium, France, Germany, Luxembourg, the Netherlands and Switzerland – signed the corresponding international agreement in December 2010, laying the legal foundation for the new airspace entity.

Skyguide's main contribution to the defragmentation of European airspace, however, is its concept to consolidate existing air navigation centres into a virtual entity (the "Virtual Centre").

== History ==
Skyguide traces its origins back to 1922, when, after the First World War had demonstrated the importance of telecommunications, Switzerland concluded an agreement with the Marconi company. Swiss subsidiary Marconi Radio AG was founded on 23 February of that year to develop wireless telegraphy. On 10 May 1928, the company name was changed to Radio Schweiz AG (RSAG) to emphasize its Swiss national character. And on 1 January 1931, the Swiss Confederation mandated Radio Schweiz to provide air navigation services in Switzerland.

Up until the end of the Second World War, Radio Schweiz was primarily engaged in meeting the telegraphic communications needs of the Swiss Confederation. Only on 21 December 1948, after concluding an agreement under which the Confederation and the country's airports would bear the costs of air navigation services, did Radio Schweiz start to monitor Swiss airspace.

On 1 January 1989, Radio Schweiz's air navigation activities were restructured and brought into the new Swisscontrol company, whose headquarters were in Bern. Swisscontrol was converted into a public limited company in 1996, and its headquarters were transferred from Bern to Geneva.

At the beginning of 2001, military air navigation services, which had been provided separately until then, were also placed under the responsibility of Swisscontrol, which was renamed Skyguide in the process. Skyguide thus became the first air navigation service provider in Europe to control the whole of its country's airspace.

On 21 September 2005, Skyguide became one of Europe's first air navigation service providers to be certificated companywide to the ISO 9001:2000 norm. In achieving this, Skyguide also met the requirement for Single European Sky (SES) certification.

On 15 March 2006, Skyguide was adjudged to have not met the requirements for operating a single control centre for Switzerland's upper airspace. The project concerned did, however, allow the management of Geneva's upper airspace to be gradually made 'stripless' from 2005 onwards. Skyguide has since been pursuing the strategy of merging its two en-route centres into one virtual entity (the Virtual Centre).

On 20 December 2006, the Swiss Federal Office of Civil Aviation (FOCA) awarded Skyguide its certification for the Single European Sky (SES).

At the beginning of 2010, six states (including Switzerland) signed an international agreement legally establishing Functional Airspace Block Europe Central (FABEC) as part of Europe's endeavours to create a Single European Sky.

On 29 August 2016, an F/A-18C of the Fliegerstaffel 17 crashed in the Susten Pass in central Switzerland during a training mission. The pilot was found dead. As a cause, an incorrect altitude instruction of the Skyguide Controller in Tower Meiringen is assumed.

=== 2002 Überlingen mid-air collision ===
On 1 July 2002, a Tupolev Tu-154 of BAL Bashkirian Airlines of the Republic of Bashkortostan in Russia and a Boeing 757 of DHL Express collided in Überlingen near the German-Swiss border at an altitude of 12,000 metres in Skyguide-controlled Southern German airspace. 71 people died. Four Skyguide employees were subsequently sentenced by a court. On 24 February 2004, Peter Nielsen, the air traffic controller who had been on duty at the time, was stabbed to death by Vitaly Kaloyev, who had lost his wife and two children in the accident.

== See also ==
- Swiss air defense
- Federal Office of Civil Aviation
