= Emmen Air Base =

Emmen Air Base Militärflugplatz Emmen
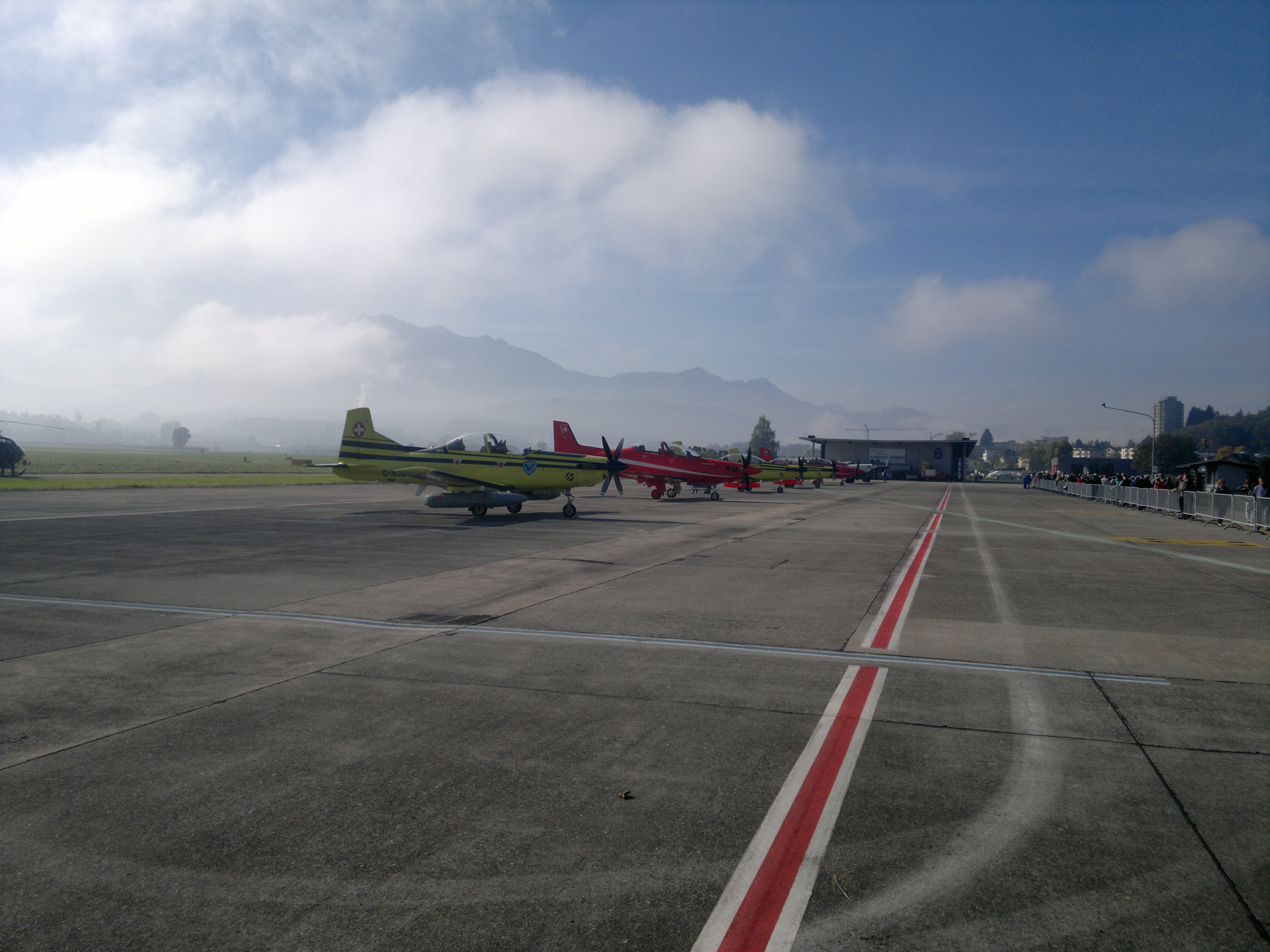
- Pilatus PC-9 and PC-21 Emmen AFB
- IATA: EML; ICAO: LSME

Summary
- Airport type: Military
- Owner: Swiss Air Force
- Serves: Emmen
- Occupants: Swiss Air Force, armasuisse, Skyguide, RUAG
- Elevation AMSL: 1,401 ft / 427 m
- Coordinates: 47°05′32″N 8°18′16″E

Map
- Location in Switzerland

Runways
Direction	Length		Surface
Direction	ft	m	Surface
04/22		3,000

Militärflugplatz Emmen (Emmen Military Air Base) (IATA: EML, ICAO: LSME) is a military airfield of the Swiss Air Force north of Emmen, Switzerland, located northwest of Lucerne.

== History ==
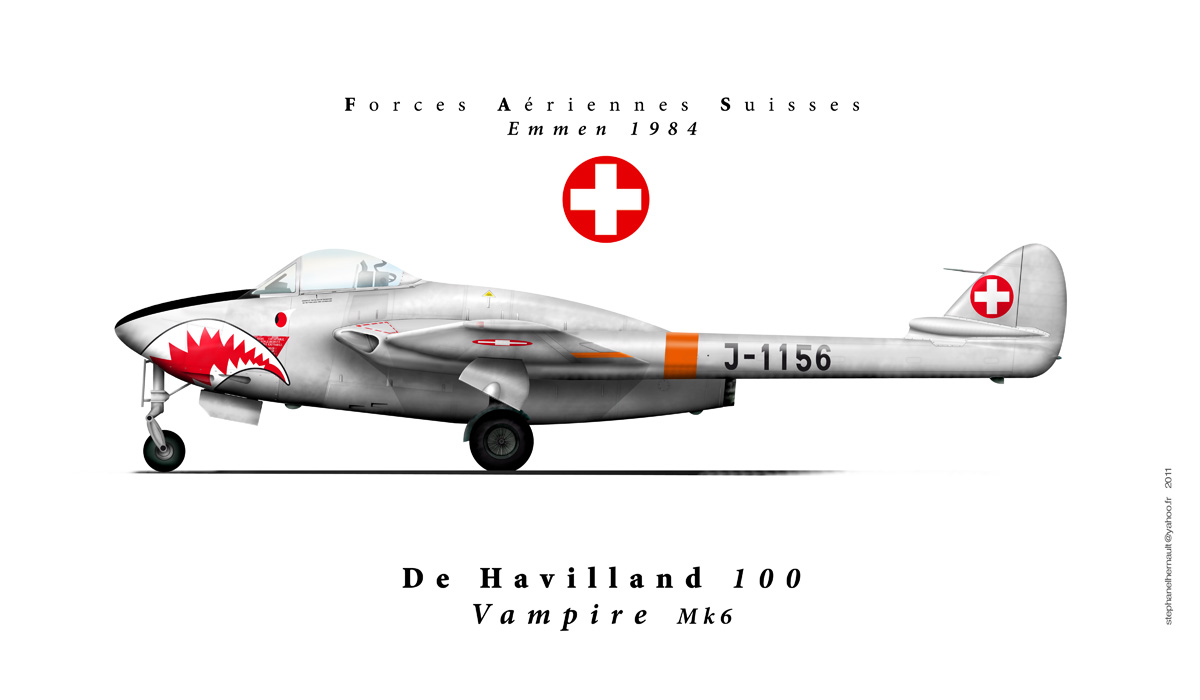
Vampire, 1984

After several previous projects in the 1920s by the federal government and the city of Lucerne, the Municipal Assembly of Emmen decided in 1938 to make a contribution of CHF 200,000 for the construction of the airfield. After the construction of the airfield, the first landing took place on 7 July 1939. In 1940, a 600-metre-long (2,000 ft) hard surface and a 600 m-long (2,000 ft) cross runway was created. This was extended in 1942 to a concrete runway at 700 m (2,300 ft), in 1946 to 1,100 m (3,600 ft), and in 1957 to 2,500 m (8,200 ft).

The first jet fighter was built by F+W Emmen (today RUAG Aerospace) and took off from Militärflugplatz Emmen; the N-20.2 Arbalète is today exhibited in the Swiss Museum of Transport. After the project EFW N-20 was canceled, the in Emmen built N-20:10 Aiguillon prototype was denied to make a first flight; perform only a few taxi on the runway of Emmen were made. The N 20:10 Aiguillon is today exhibited in the Flieger-Flab-Museum. All types of aircraft of the Swiss Air Force have been at Militärflugplatz Emmen since its existence. de Havilland Vampire, de Havilland Venom, Aérospatiale Alouette II, Aérospatiale Alouette III, Hawker Hunter, Dassault Mirage IIIS, Dassault MirageIIIRS.

== Today ==
The airfield of Emmen is used primarily by the military and is operated by the Swiss Air Force as a training and alternate airfield for jet and propeller aircraft as well as the ADS95 RUAG Ranger UAV. This means that no jet aircraft squadron is stationed in Emmen, but the airfield is still used as a training and alternate air base. The air base is, at both ends of the runway, equipped with retractable arresting gear devices (used by the F/A-18C Hornet and in case of a problem by the F-5E Tiger). Next to the aerodrome serves the following military uses:

- Location of the aerobatic team Patrouille Suisse
- Flight training for Swiss Air Force fighter pilots with the Pilatus PC-21
- Location of transport squadrons and also with charterflights for the Kosovo Force (KFOR) troops of Swisscoy
- Training and courses with reconnaissance drones
- Training center for simulators with Eurocopter AS332 Super Puma, Eurocopter EC 635 and Pilatus PC-21. Factory flights RUAG Aviation on behalf of the Swiss Air Force
- Test and trial flights Armasuisse

In addition to the military use of the airfield, limited civil use is possible on a small scale. The RUAG Aviation manages a total quota of 1,000 flight movements per year for civilian use. RUAG itself use Emmen for test flights and for the transport of rocket payload fairings with rented Antonov An-124 transport aircraft. It is the home base of the three Armasuisse aircraft: the Pilatus PC-12 HB-FOG, Pilatus PC-6 HB-FCF and the Diamond DA42 R-711. In the summer flight break find exceptionally organized by the private sector, civil major events take place. Air traffic control is performed by the military branch of Skyguide Skyguide National.

In June 2026 the Air Base hosted US Vice President JD Vance as he arrived and departed on board Air Force 2 for peace talks to end the 2026 Iran War at the nearby Bürgenstock Resort.

== See also ==
- List of aerospace flight test centres
