= Dewoitine D.27 =

Parasol monoplane fighter aircraft

D.27
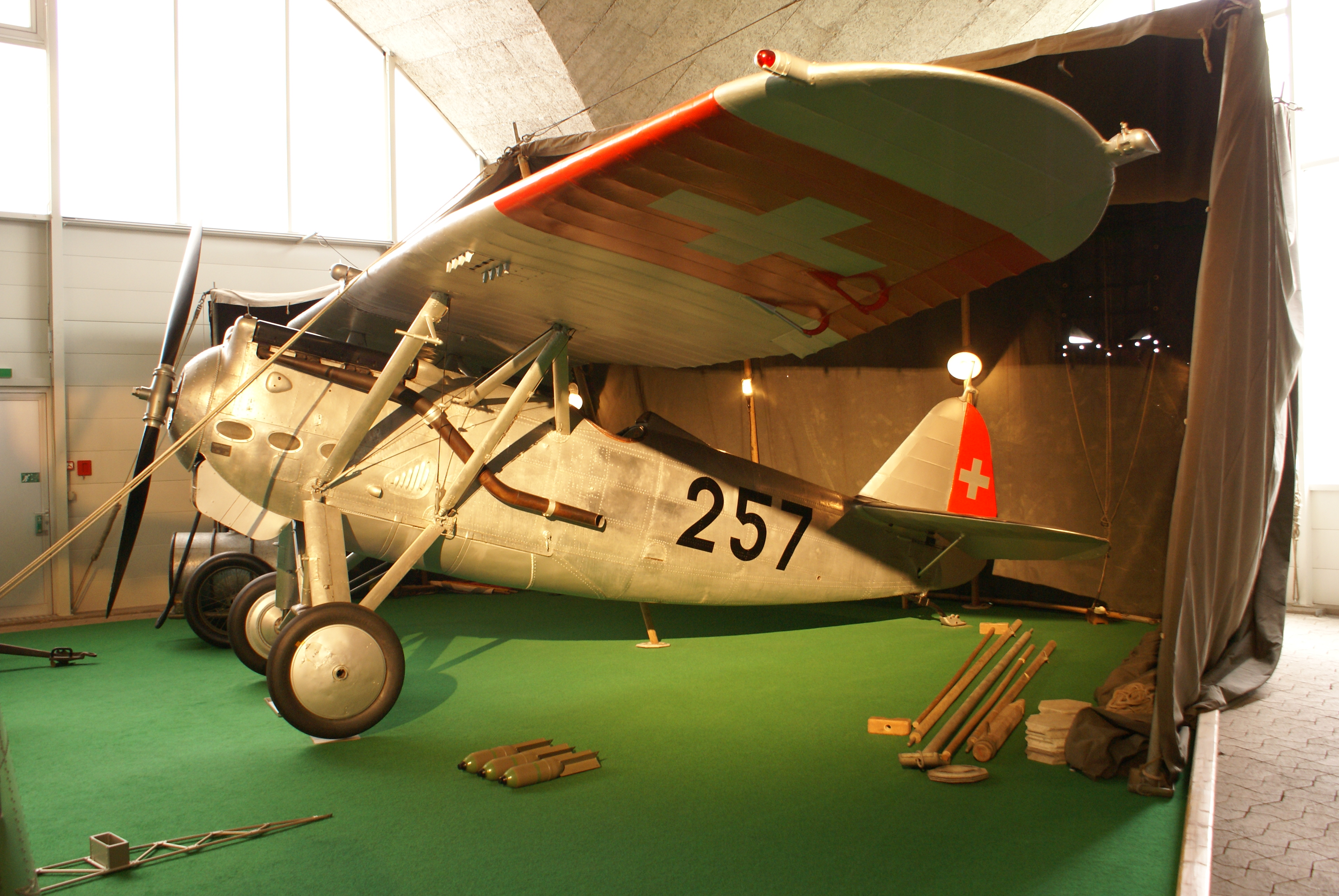

General information
- Type: Fighter
- Manufacturer: Dewoitine
- Primary user: Swiss Air Force

History
- Introduction date: 1931
- First flight: 1928

The Dewoitine D.27 was a parasol monoplane fighter aircraft designed by Émile Dewoitine in 1928.

== Design and development ==
After the end of World War I, the slump in demand for aircraft forced Dewoitine to close his company and move to Switzerland in 1927.

He produced the D.27 the following year, 66 of which were produced for the Swiss Air Force from 1931. It was also license-built in Yugoslavia by Zmaj aircraft and in Romania.

== Operational history ==
Seven strengthened versions, designated the D.53, served experimentally with the French Escadrille 7C1, flying from the aircraft carrier Béarn.

== Variants ==
- D.271 : One aircraft used for testing a Hispano-Suiza 12Hb engine.
- D.273 : One aircraft used for testing a Bristol Jupiter engine with supercharger.
- D.531 : One aircraft used for testing a Hispano-Suiza engine.
- D.532 : A single aircraft used for testing a Rolls-Royce Kestrel inline engine.
- D.535 : One aircraft fitted with an HS 12Xbis engine.
- D.534 : Used for parachute trials.

== Operators ==
France

- Aviation Navale

Romania

- Royal Romanian Air Force

Spain

- Spanish Republican Air Force

Switzerland

- Swiss Air Force

Yugoslavia

- Royal Yugoslav Air Force

== Specifications (D.27) ==
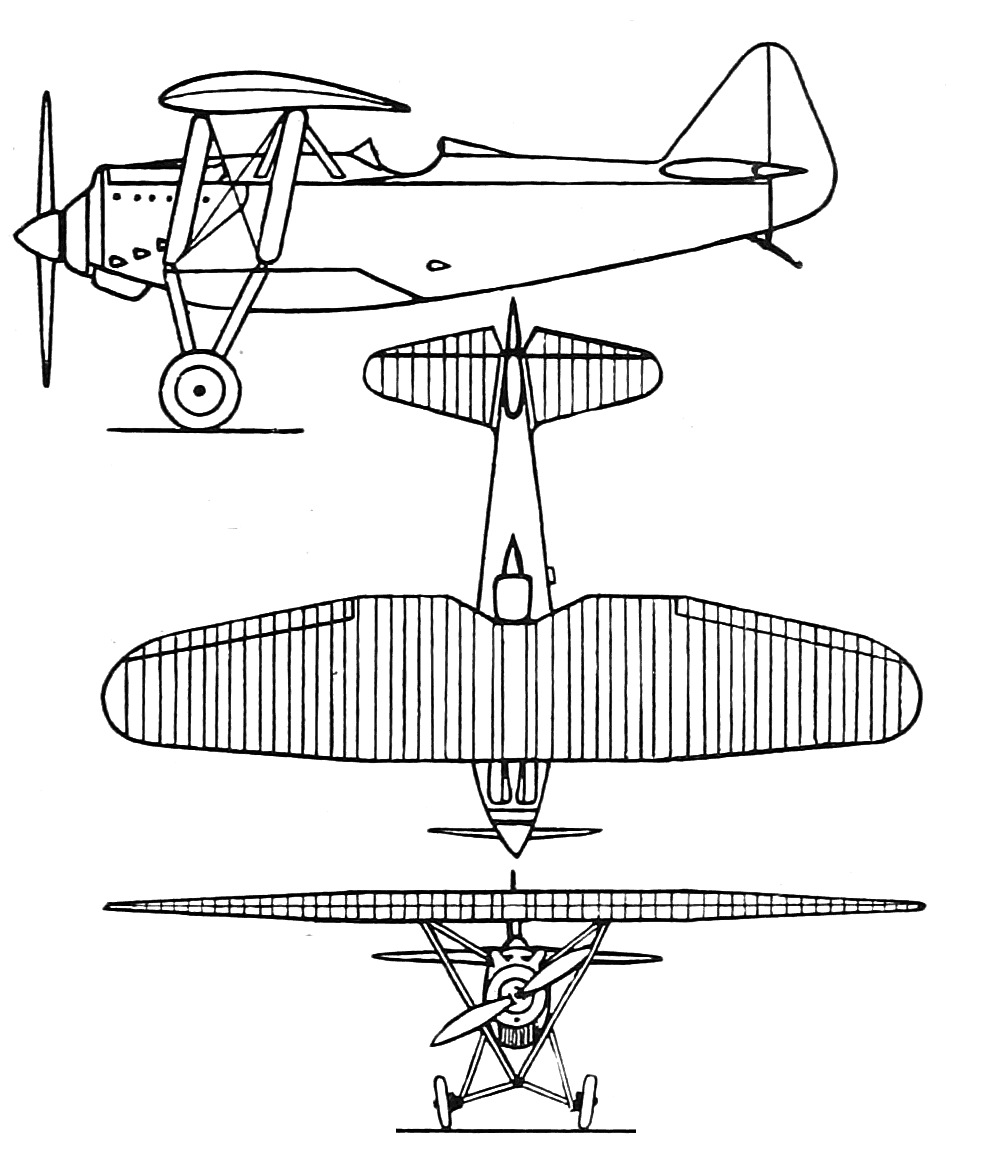
Dewoitine D.27 3-view drawing from Aero Digest July,1930

D.27 6-view. Yugoslav version with metal tail vs. French version. In the middle are the prototype propeller, wooden propeller and metal propeller.

Data from Encyclopedia of Military Aircraft

General characteristics

- Crew: one
- Length: 6.5 m (21 ft 4 in)
- Wingspan: 9.8 m (32 ft 2 in)
- Height: 2.79 m (9 ft 2 in)
- Empty weight: 1,038 kg (2,288 lb)
- Gross weight: 1,382 kg (3,047 lb)
- Max takeoff weight: 1,414 kg (3,117 lb)
- Powerplant: 1 × Hispano-Suiza 12Mc V-12 liquid-cooled piston engine, 373 kW (500 hp)

Performance

- Maximum speed: 312 km/h (194 mph, 168 kn)
- Range: 600 km (370 mi, 320 nmi)
- Service ceiling: 9,200 m (30,200 ft)
- Rate of climb: 10 m/s (2,000 ft/min)

Armament

- Guns: 2 × fixed forward-firing 7.5 mm (.295 in) Darne machine guns

== See also ==
Related lists

- List of Interwar military aircraft
- List of military aircraft of France
- List of aircraft of the Spanish Republican Air Force
- List of fighter aircraft

== Bibliography ==
- Andersson, Lennart (January 1998). "Courrier des Lecteurs" [Readers' Letters]. Avions: Toute l'aéronautique et son histoire (in French) (58): 3. ISSN 1243-8650.
- Bruner, Georges (1977). "Fighters a la Francaise, Part One". Air Enthusiast (3): 85–95. ISSN 0143-5450.
- "Courrier Lecteurs" [Readers's Letters]. Avions: Toute l'aéronautique et son histoire (in French) (53): 2. August 1997. ISSN 1243-8650.
- Cortet, Pierre (August 1997). "Les premièrs chasseurs de Emile Dewoitine (6ème partie)". Avions: Toute l'aéronautique et son histoire (in French) (53): 34–40. ISSN 1243-8650.
- Cortet, Pierre (September 1997). "Les premièrs chasseurs de Emile Dewoitine (7ème partie et fin)". Avions: Toute l'aéronautique et son histoire (in French) (54): 24–32. ISSN 1243-8650.
- Cortet, Pierre (April 1998). "Courrier des Lecteurs" [Readers' Letters]. Avions: Toute l'aéronautique et son histoire (in French) (61): 14. ISSN 1243-8650.
- Janić, Čedomir; O. Petrović (2011). Short History of Aviation in Serbia. Beograd: Aerokomunikacije. ISBN 978-86-913973-2-6.
- Soulard, Stéphane (January 1998). "Courrier des Lecteurs" [Readers' Letters]. Avions: Toute l'aéronautique et son histoire (in French) (58): 2–3. ISSN 1243-8650.
- Soulard, Stéphane (July 1998). "Courrier des Lecteurs" [Readers' Letters]. Avions: Toute l'aéronautique et son histoire (in French) (64): 5. ISSN 1243-8650.
