= Lufttransport Staffel 3 =

Lufttransport Staffel 3 Escadrille Transport Aérien 3
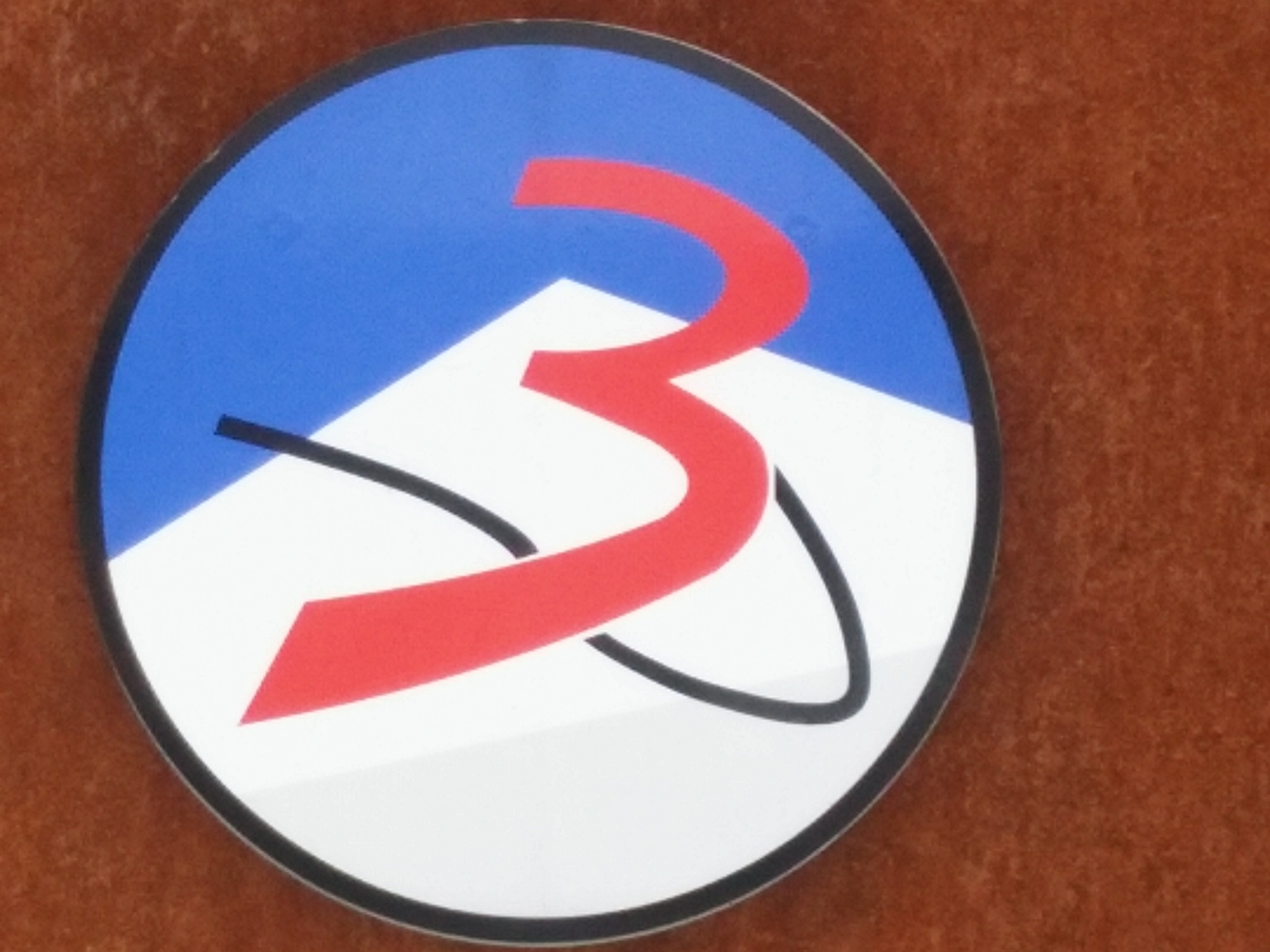
- squadron emblem Lufttransport Staffel 3
- Active: 1965 - today
- Country: Switzerland
- Branch: Swiss Air Force
- Role: transport squadron
- Garrison/HQ: Dübendorf Air Base

Lufttransport Staffel 3 is a transport squadron of the Swiss Air Force . The unit is part of the Berufsfliegerkorps and is part of the Airtransportsquadron 3 together with the Lufttransport Staffel 4, Which on its part belongs to Flugplatzkommando 2 at Alpnach Air Base. The home base of the Lufttransport Staffel 3 is Dübendorf Air Base. The squadron carries as coat of arms a red number 3 whose lower end transitions into a black line and finally forms the contour of a helicopter in flight, in front of a white mountain, blue sky and gray ground. A former Lufttransport Staffel 3 badge was round with a blue background down with two white mountain peaks to be seen, also with white circle who indicated radius of the rotor and the radius of the tailrotor. A white line formed the number 3 with the rotor and the bow of the red helicopter hull.

== History ==
Lufttransport Staffel 3 was founded in 1965. Until 1973 the unit used the Piper Super Cub. From 1968 to 1992 were Alouette II used, the Alouette lll from 1974 to 2010. Nowadays theLufttransport Staffel 3 operates the helicopter types Super Puma and EC635. The Super Pumas came to the Lufttransport Staffel 3 in 2001, the EC635 followed in 2010. Their main tasks are air transport in favor of the troops of the army. Other tasks are Search and Rescue. If necessary, the Lufttransport Staffel 3 also supports the civilian authorities (e.g., in police operations, in the fight against forest fires or in the case of evacuations due to avalanches) and monitoring the border on surveillance flights.

== Aircraft ==
- Piper PA-18 Super Cub
- Alouette II
- Alouette III
- AS332M1 Super Puma
- AS532UL Cougar
- Eurocopter EC635
