= Lufttransport Staffel 4 =

Lufttransport Staffel 4 Escadrille Transport Aérien 4
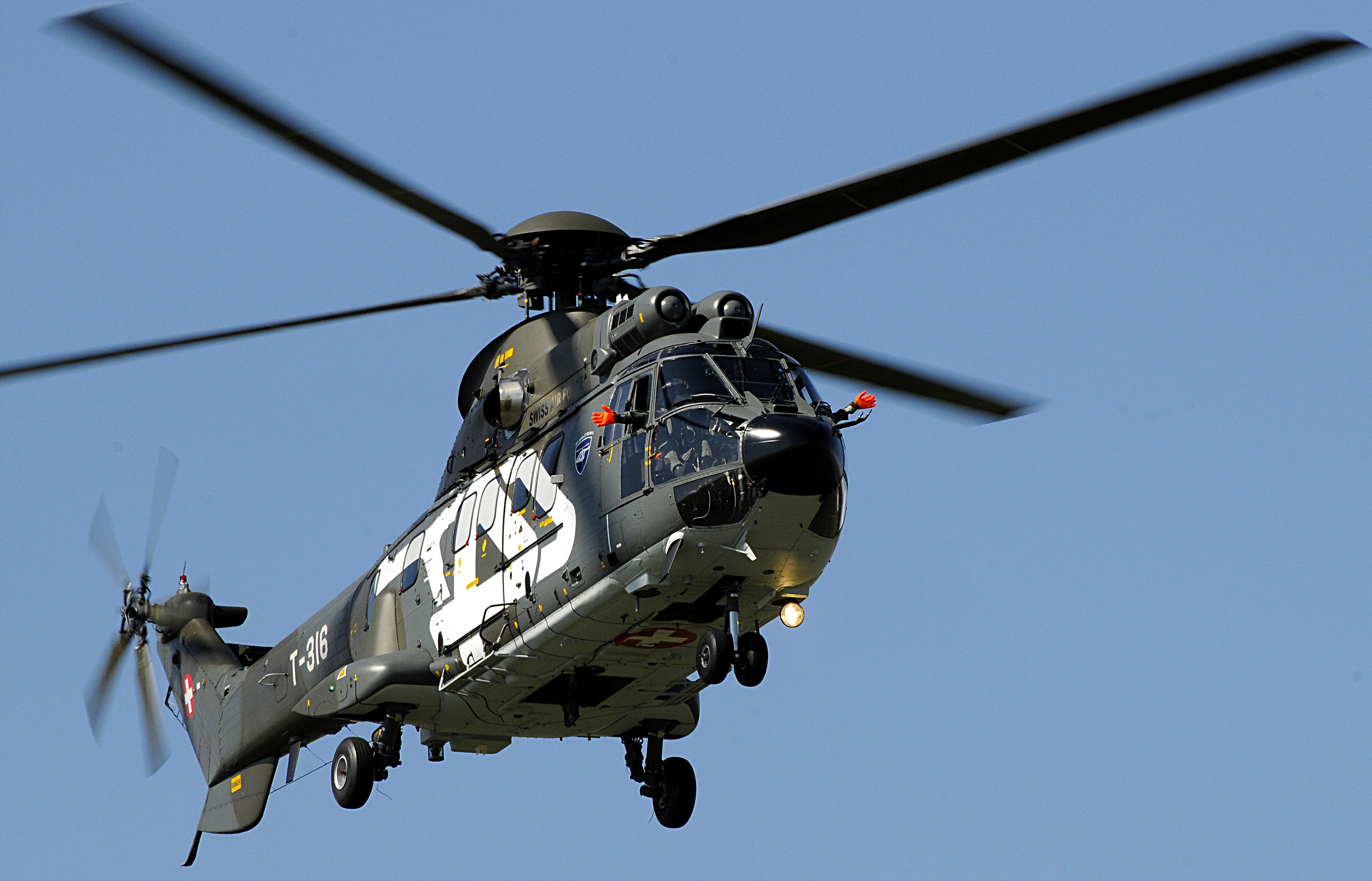
- Aerospatiale AS-332M1 Super Puma with squadron emblem Lufttransport Staffel 4
- Active: 1964 - today
- Country: Switzerland
- Branch: Swiss Air Force
- Role: transport squadron
- Garrison/HQ: Dübendorf Air Base

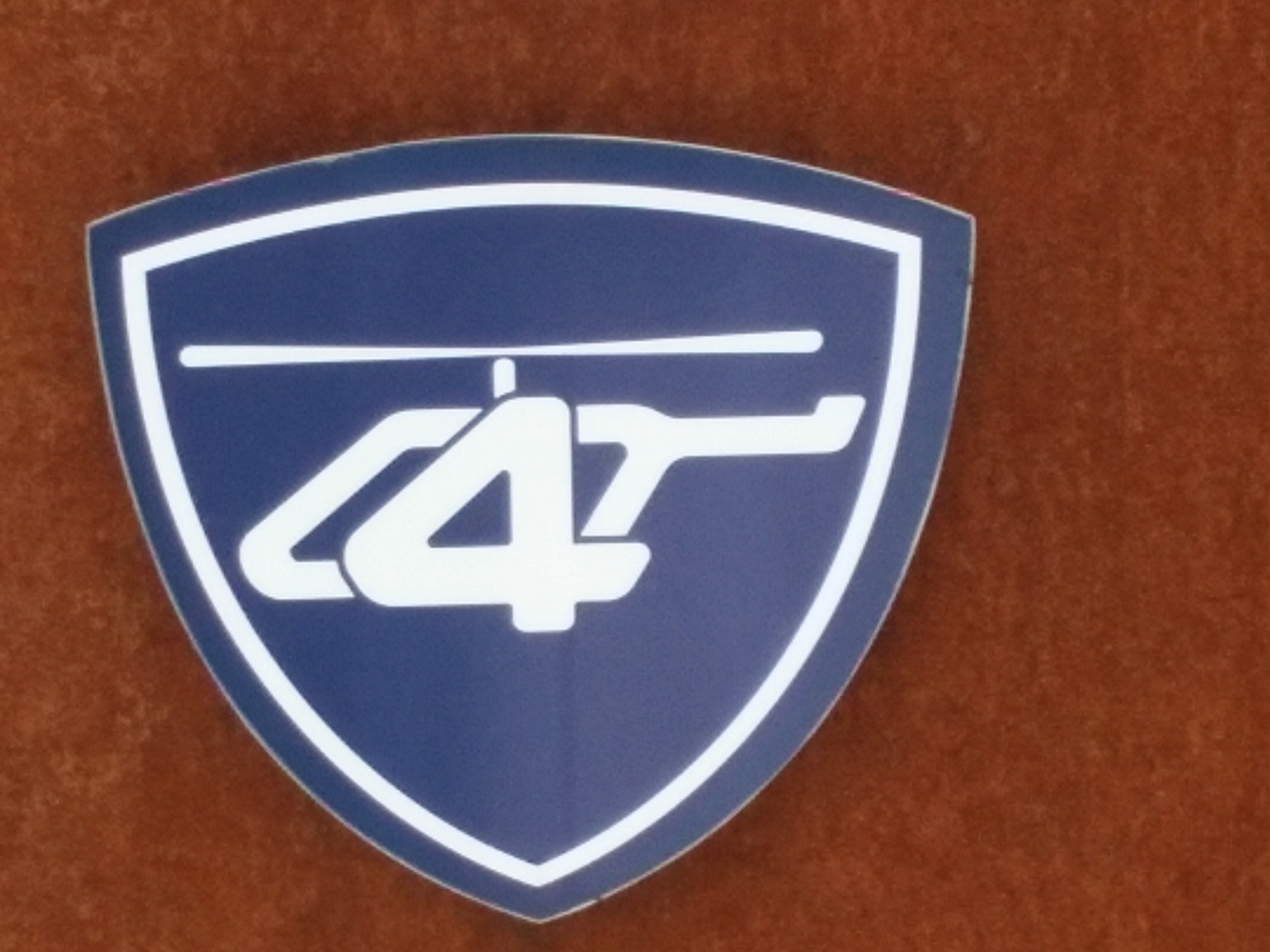
Emblem of the LT St4

Lufttransport Staffel 4 (Lt St 4 or Lt 4) is a transport squadron of the Swiss Air Force. The squadron forms part of the Berufsfliegerkorps but hosts also militia pilots. Together with Lufttransport Staffel 3 it is subordinated to Lufttransportgeschwader 3, Which for its part belongs to the airfield command 2 at the Alpnach Air Base. The home base of the Lufttransport Staffel 4 is Dübendorf Air Base. The Lufttransport Staffel 4 carries a white numeral 4 as coat of arms, stylized to form the trunk of a helicopter against a blue background.

== History ==
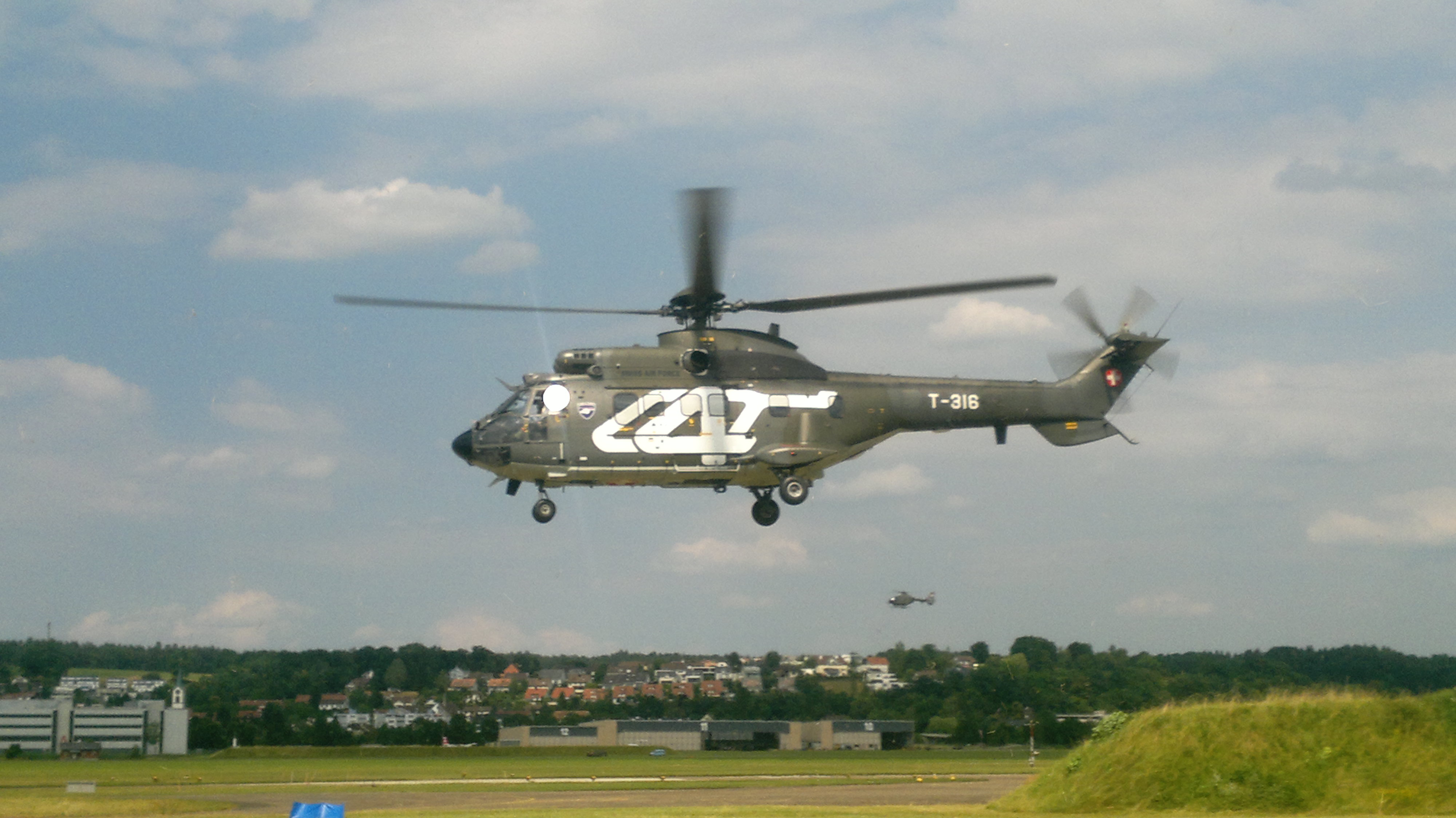
Super Puma with LT4 logo

The Lufttransport Staffel 4 was founded in 1964. Until 1973 the Lufttransport Staffel 4 also used the Piper Super Cub. From 1968 to 1992 the Lufttransport Staffel 4 used Alouette II, and Alouette III from 1974 to 2010. After the retirement of the Alouettes, a transition followed to the helicopter types Super Puma, Cougar and EC635. The main task of the squadron is transport as well as Search and rescue operations. Lufttransport Staffel 4 can be called up by civilian authorities (eg, police operations, firefighting or in the case of evacuations due to natural disaster) The squadron also flies surveillance flights for the Grenzwachtkorps. In the 2014, the Lufttransport Staffel 4 was celebrating its 50th anniversary and a Super Puma was fitted with a white Lufttransport Staffel 4 logo. This helicopter was part of the flying display at the Air14, where among others it was flown in formation with the specially painted F/A-18 J-5014, celebrating the 100th anniversary of the Swiss Air Force. On September 28, 2016, the Cougar T-338 crashed near the Gotthard Hospice; two militia pilots of the Lufttransport Staffel 4 were killed and the loadmaster seriously injured.

== Aircraft ==
- Piper PA-18 Super Cub
- Alouette II
- Alouette III
- AS332M1 Super Puma
- AS532UL Cougar
- Eurocopter EC635
