= Agualeguas National Airport =

Agualeguas National Airport Aeropuerto Nacional de Agualeguas Estación Aérea Militar #10 "Teniente Coronel P.A. Praxedis López Ramos"
- IATA: none; ICAO: MMAL; LID: AGL

Summary
- Airport type: Military
- Owner/Operator: SEDENA
- Serves: Agualeguas
- Location: Agualeguas Municipality
- Elevation AMSL: 676 ft / 206 m
- Coordinates: 26°20′02″N 099°32′34″W
- Website: www.sedena.gob/bases-aereas

Map
- Location of the airport in Nuevo Leon AGL (Mexico)

Runways
Direction	Length		Surface
Direction	ft	m	Surface
02/20	9,350	2,850	Asphalt
- SEDENA

Agualeguas National Airport (ICAO: MMAL, AFAC: AGL) is an airport located 2 miles to north-northwest from Agualeguas, Nuevo León, Mexico. It currently operates as the 10th Air Force Station.

== History and facilities ==
It was inaugurated in March 1990 by then-President Carlos Salinas de Gortari, and on November 26 of that same year it welcomed the Mexican Air Force Boeing 757 "TP-01" and "Air Force One", carrying then-President George Bush, to sign the free trade agreement between Mexico and the United States.

It has a 2,850-meter-long and 30-meter-wide runway with turn ramps at both ends, two taxiways, a 27,600-square-meter aviation apron, hangars, and a control tower. On December 1, 2020, it was closed to civil aviation to become the 10th Air Force Station "Lieutenant Colonel Praxedis López Ramos."
