= Dübendorf Air Base =

Military airfield in Switzerland

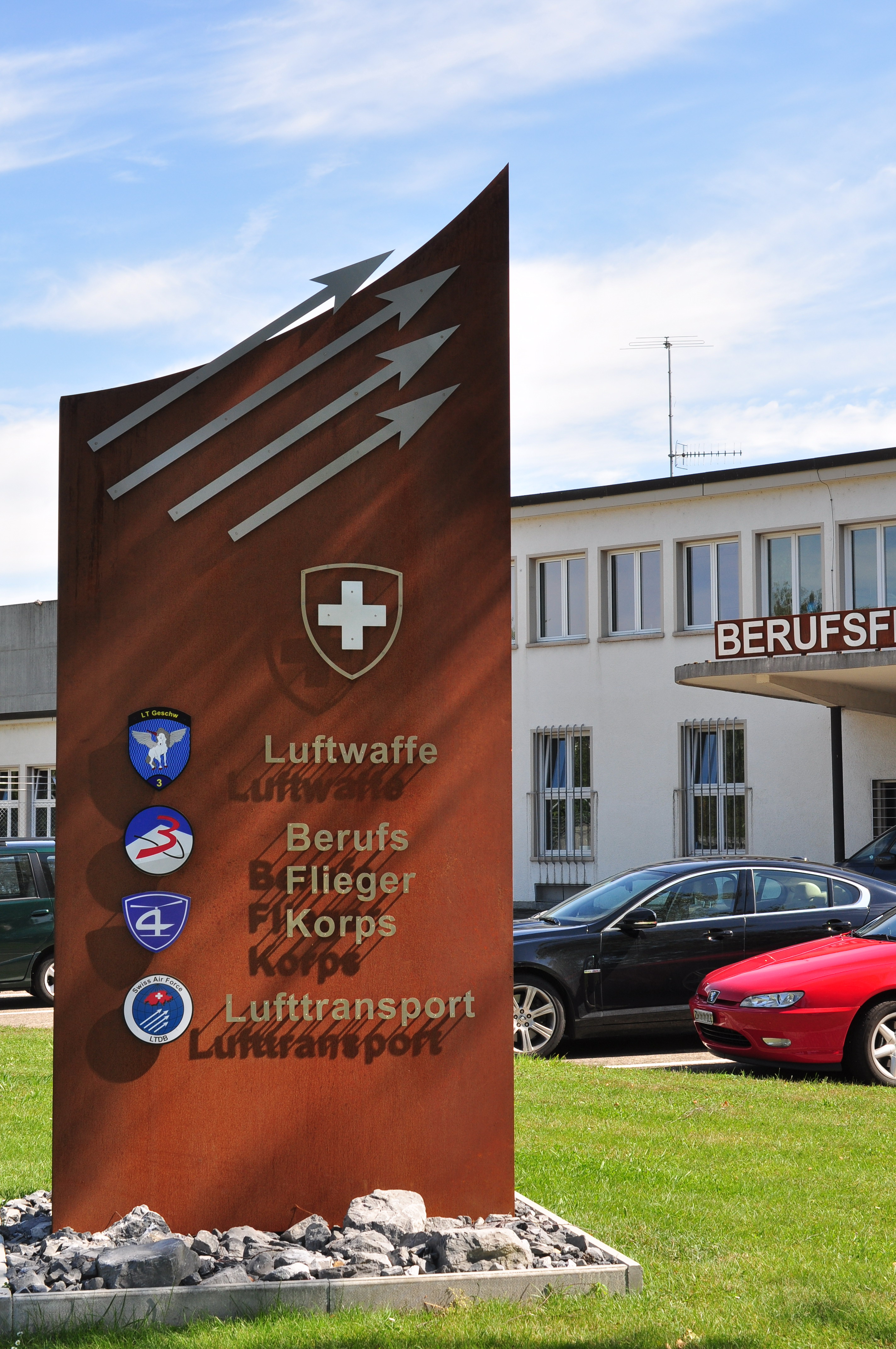

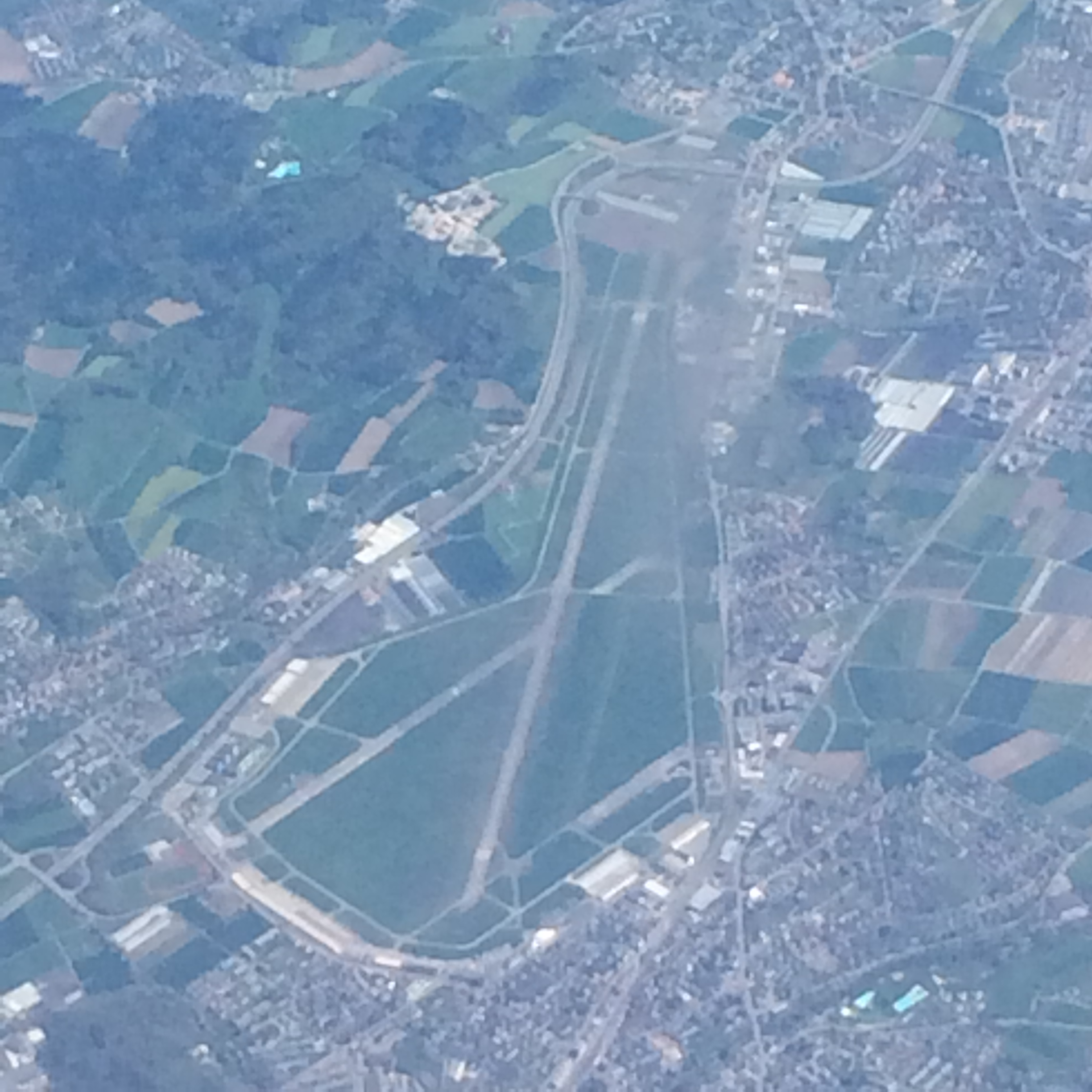
- Aerial view of the Dübendorf Air Base
- IATA: none; ICAO: LSMD

Summary
- Airport type: Military
- Owner: Swiss Air Force
- Serves: Dübendorf
- Occupants: Swiss Air Force, JuAir, Rega (air rescue), Skyguide, Solar Impulse, Motorfluggruppe Zürich
- Elevation AMSL: 448 m / 1,470 ft
- Coordinates: 47°23′55″N 8°38′53″E

Map
- Location in Switzerland

Runways
Direction	Length		Surface
Direction	ft	m	Surface
11/29	7,726	2,355	Asphalt
11R/29L	2,133	650	Grass

Dübendorf Air Base (German: Militärflugplatz Dübendorf) (ICAO: LSMD) was a military airfield of the Swiss Air Force northeast of Dübendorf in Switzerland, located east of Zürich. It includes the Flieger-Flab-Museum.

== History ==
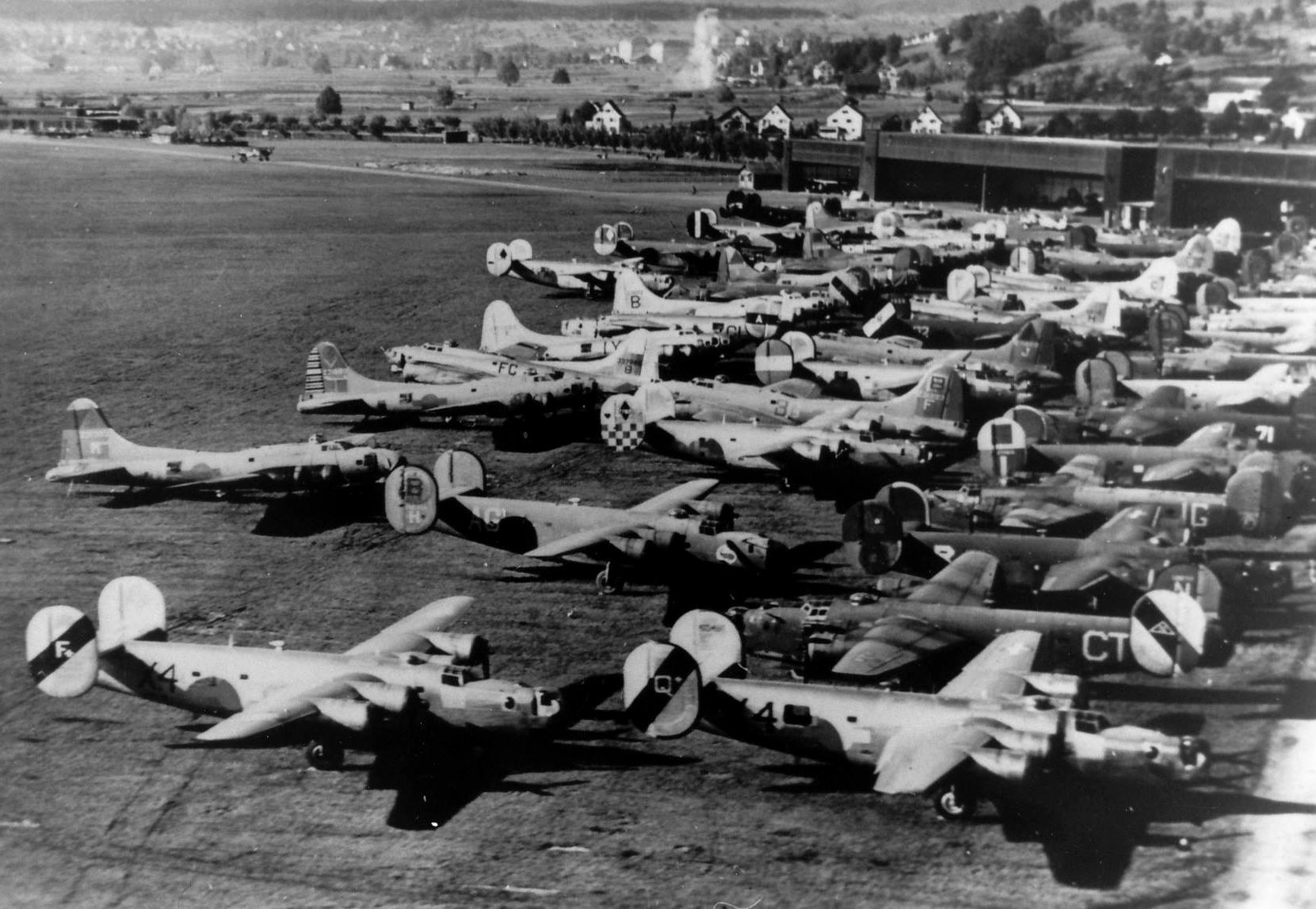
USAAF B-17 and B-24 bombers interned at Dübendorf during the Second World War

The search for a suitable site for an airfield started in 1909. On 1 August 1910 improvement of the swamp started and on 22 October 1910 the first airshow was held on the Airfield Dübendorf. Since 1914, Dübendorf has been used as an air base by the Swiss Air Force. From 1919 on Dübendorf was also an airport for civil airlines, first for the predecessor of Swissair, the Ad Astra Aero, and from 1932 on for Swissair.

During World War II there was virtually no civil flying activity. Any foreign military aircraft that was interned by Switzerland was held at Dübendorf, including about 120 United States Army Air Forces (USAAF) B-17 Flying Fortress and B-24 Liberator bombers, together with one Luftwaffe Me 262 jet fighter. From 1943, Switzerland shot down USAAF and Royal Air Force aircraft, mainly bombers, overflying Switzerland during the war: six aircraft by Swiss Air Force fighters and nine by anti-aircraft cannons; 36 American and British airmen were killed. Repaired by USAAF technicians, on 7 September 1945, around 60 U.S. aircraft took off from Dübendorf to return to their bases, where they were scrapped. The backbone of the Swiss Air Force during this time consisted of Bf 109E and Morane-Saulnier M.S.406.

In 1948, civil aviation moved to the newly opened Zurich Airport and Dübendorf became a purely military airfield. Dübendorf had been considered for expansion as Switzerland's primary international airport, but the Federal government reportedly preferred the development of a new Zurich airport for dedicated civil use for technical reasons including the difficulties inherent in a shared military and civil facility.

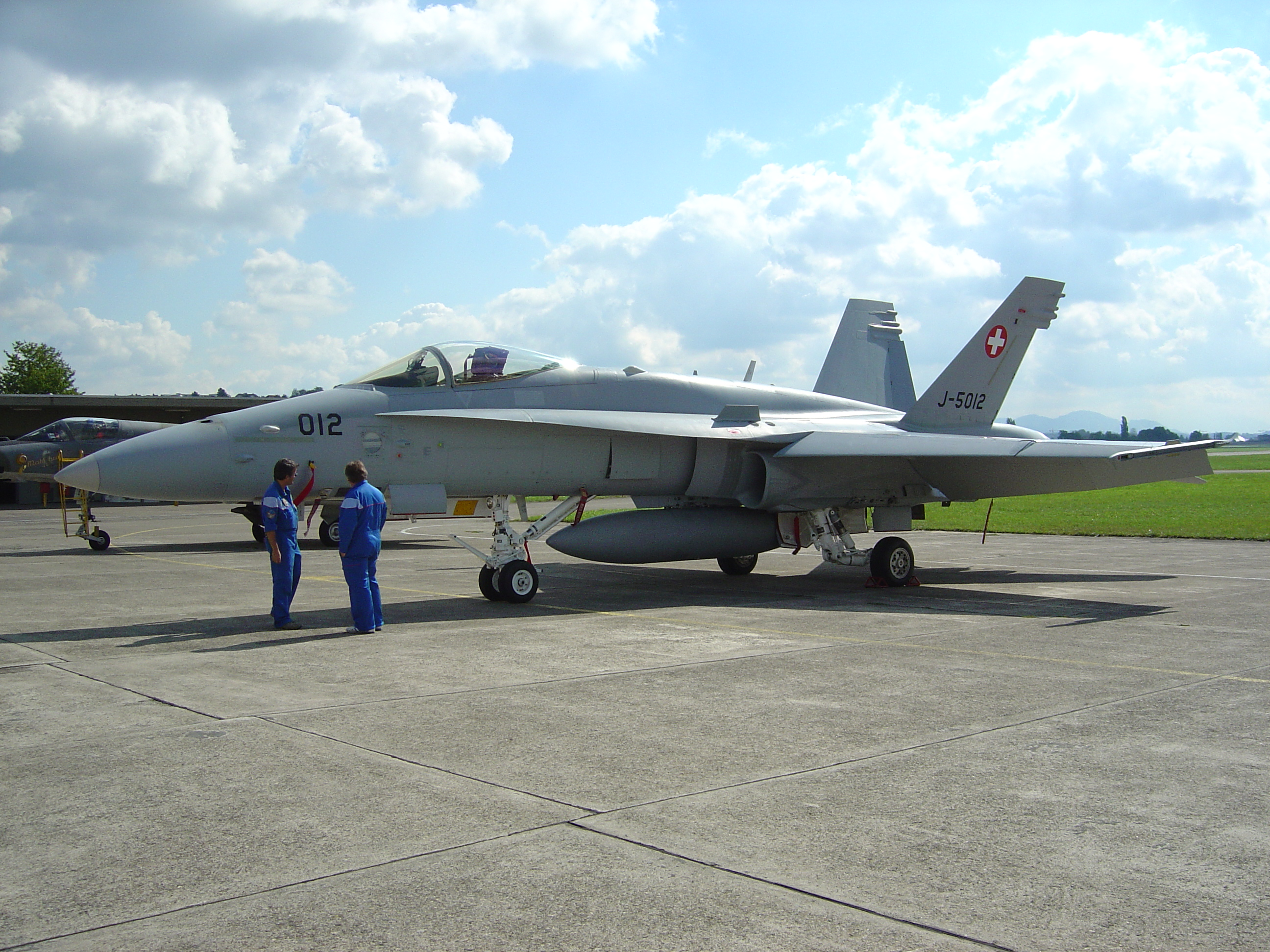
F/A-18 «Hornet» at Dübendorf in 2003

During the Cold War, Dübendorf was the home of Aérospatiale Alouette II and Alouette III helicopters and jets such as the de Havilland Vampire, de Havilland Venom, Hawker Hunter, Dassault Mirage III and Northrop F-5 Tiger II while it was not a war base. Dübendorf was the home base for the Patrouille Suisse aerobatic team until they moved to Emmen Air Base. With the move of Fliegerstaffel 11 (Fighter Squadron 11) Tigers with the F/A-18C Hornet to Meiringen AB in 2005 the history of fighter aircraft in Dübendorf ended. The air base was equipped with retractable arresting gear devices at both ends of the runway, which were used by the F/A-18. This was removed after 2005.

On 26 June 2009, the long-range experimental solar-powered aircraft Solar Impulse 1 was first presented to the public at Dübendorf Air Base. Following taxi testing, a short-hop test flight was made on 3 December 2009, piloted by Markus Scherdel. In August 2013, after setting several records including a cross-U.S. flight, the aircraft returned to Dübendorf to be placed in storage. Solar Impulse also caused the second landing of the largest aircraft to land at the airport, when a Boeing 747-400F belonging to Cargolux brought Solar Impulse back. A Swissair Jumbo had once landed empty at Dübendorf.

On 22 September 2015, the Airbus A310 Zero-G reduced gravity aircraft flew from Dübendorf Air Base, in the first operational flight of a Zero-G Airbus outside France. The first public parabolic flight took place on 22 October 2016.

== Today ==
Today Dübendorf AB is the home of Lufttransport Staffel 3 and Lufttransport Staffel 4 (Air Transport Squadron 3 and 4) with Eurocopter EC635, Eurocopter AS332 Super Puma, Eurocopter AS532 Cougar, De Havilland Canada Twin Otter, Beechcraft 1900 and Beechcraft Super King Air. Dübendorf is, together with Locarno AB, the home base of the PC-7 Team and the Super Puma/Cougar Display Team. Other Swiss military aircraft such as the Pilatus PC-6 Turbo-Porter and Pilatus PC-9 are often seen in Dübendorf, less often the Dassault Falcon 900, Cessna Citation Excel or the Armasuisse Diamond DA42 and Pilatus PC-12. Under supervision of the Swiss Air Force, Dübendorf is also used by friendly nations in the context of exercises or joint missions (e.g. Austrian C-130 or German CH-53). Dübendorf acts also as parking space for private business jets and government jets during the WEF at Davos.

Also located at Dübendorf AFB is:

- The Swiss Air Force Command (AOC)
- Air Defense & Direction Center (the peacetime air defense C3 air operations center)
- Skyguide National (military air traffic control)
- Skyguide (civil air traffic control for Switzerland (except western part of Switzerland, which is monitored by skyguide Geneva) and southern Germany)
- Berufsfliegerkorps

== Other users ==
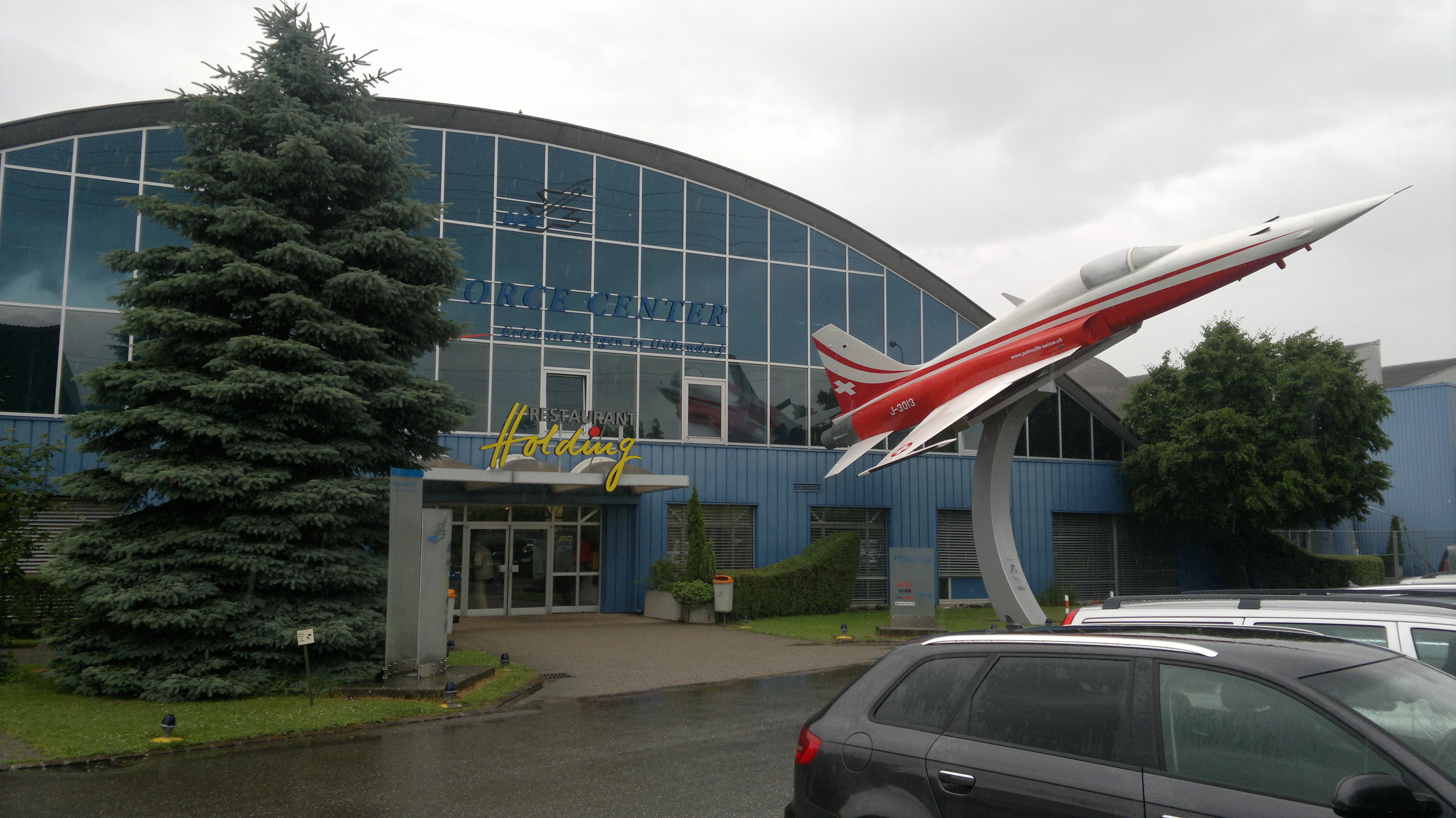
The Flieger-Flab-Museum

- Skyguide (see above)
- Police Helicopter Unit
- JuAir Operating 3 historical Ju 52
- Base 1 of the Rega (air rescue)
- Solar Impulse 1 (HB-SIA) was built, tested and is now stored at Dübendorf Air Base.
- Touring Club Suisse Anti skid driving ranch.
- Flieger-Flab-Museum

== Future ==
Current plans are that from 2016 on, only the Swiss Air Force will use helicopters at Dübendorf and that the Rega and the Kantons Polizei will have to move their helicopters to the opposite side of the airfield (next to the military helicopter hangars). The government has allowed a mixed civil/military use of Dübendorf AB and the joint use of aircraft maintenance companies such Jet Aviation is hoped to ensure the continued existence of the fixed wing aircraft operating in Dübendorf.

Since the capacity of Zurich Airport will (according to the Monitoring Report published by FOCA) hit a limit wall, Dübendorf Air Base has been proposed as a future relief airport, comparable to Linate Airport.

Otherwise the use of the Dübendorf Air Base has been proposed as "the 4th runway of Zurich Airport".

As far as the Dübendorf Airfield seems to be one of the oldest worldwide still existing, it is proposed to be evaluated as UNESCO World Heritage.

One part of the property will be used to build a so-called Innovationspark (factory, office rooms and apartments for start up enterprises). The further development of the airfield area was judged to be inadmissible by the administrative court of the canton of Zürich in July 2020 and the cantonal design plan “Innovation Park Zurich” was repealed. The Zurich government council referred the judgment to the federal court.

== Books ==
- Fliegermuseum Dübendorf, VFMF, Dübendorf 1989 (ISBN none).
- Ernst Frei: Erlebter Aktivdienst 1939–1945. Novalis, [Schaffhausen] 2010, ISBN 978-3-907160-54-1.
- Max Hügli: Fliegermuseum – BAMF, Dübendorf 1981 (ISBN none).
- Uno Zer Zero Aero Publications 2013, ISBN 978-3-9524239-05
- Menschen Maschinen Missionen Geschichten vom Militärflugplatz Dübendorf 1914–2014, published by Schweizer Luftwaffe 12014 ISBN 978-3-033-04653-5

== See also ==
- Swiss Innovation Park
