= CITIC Offshore Helicopter =

- Native name: 中信海洋直升机股份有限公司
- Company type: Public
- Traded as: SZSE: 000099
- Industry: Helicopter services
- Owner: CITIC
- Website: www.cohc.citic

CITIC Offshore Helicopter Co., Ltd. is a China-based company that engages in offshore helicopter oil, general aviation transportation and aviation maintenance services. It is a part of CITIC Group.

CITIC Offshore Helicopter operates its businesses primarily in Shenzhen and Zhanjiang (Guangdong Province), Shanghai, Tianjin, Beijing, China.

As of 2008, CITIC Offshore Helicopter conducted 22,834 flights, logged 19,271.4 flight hours, transported 210,198 passengers and approximately 2.36 million kilograms of cargo.

== Fleet ==
CITIC OH operates:

- 8 Eurocopter EC 155B1
- 9 EC 225LP
- 10 AS 332L2 Mark 2
- 2 AS 365B2
- 2 EC135
- Dassault Falcon 2000 EX and 7X
- H410 - operated for China Maritime Safety Administration
- Z11
- A109E
- A109S - operated for China Maritime Safety Administration
- Ka-32A
- 1 Sikorsky S-92
