= General Coordination of the Presidential Air Transport Unit =

The General Coordination of the Presidential Air Transport Unit is the main Mexican Presidential transport unit. Mexico's President uses mainly a Boeing 757-225 ordered by President Miguel de la Madrid built in 1987 exclusively for this purpose. The plane's official callsign when the president is inboard is TP-01, which stands for Transporte Presidencial 1 (Presidential Transport 1). President Felipe Calderón ordered a new Boeing 787-8 at a cost of 218 million dollars, which has been delivered on February 2, 2016 to substitute the aging 757, and was recently sold to the Government of Tajikistan. When flying into airports with short runways, he uses either a Boeing 737-33A (TP-02) or a Boeing 737-322 (TP-03). For short trips he uses a Super Puma VIP edition called TPH-01 which stands for Transporte Presidencial Helicoptero 1 (Helicopter Presidential Transport 1). Before the 737s and the 757, two Boeing 727-100 were used as presidential transport. The current presidential fleet as of 2008 is as follows:

Aircraft	Registration	Code Name
Boeing 757-225	XC-UJM	TP-01
Boeing 737-33A	XC-UJB	TP-02
Boeing 737-322	XC-LJG	TP-03
Gulfstream III	XC-UJN	TP-06
Gulfstream III	XC-UJO	TP-07
Learjet 35A	XC-IPP	TP-104
Rockwell Turbocommander 695A	XC-UTA	TP-216
Super Puma AS332	XC-UHV	TPH-01
Super Puma AS332	XC-UHU	TPH-02
Super Puma AS332	XC-UHO	TPH-03
Super Puma AS332	XC-UHM	TPH-05
Super Puma AS332	XC-UHP	TPH-06
Puma SA330	XC-UHC	TPH-08
Puma SA330	XC-UHA	TPH-09
