= Berufsfliegerkorps =

Berufsfliegerkorps (BFK) professional flying corps corps of the aviateurs professionnels corpo degli aviatori di professione
- Active: 2005-today
- Country: Switzerland
- Branch: Swiss Air Force
- Role: professional military pilot's unit
- Garrison/HQ: Dübendorf Air Base

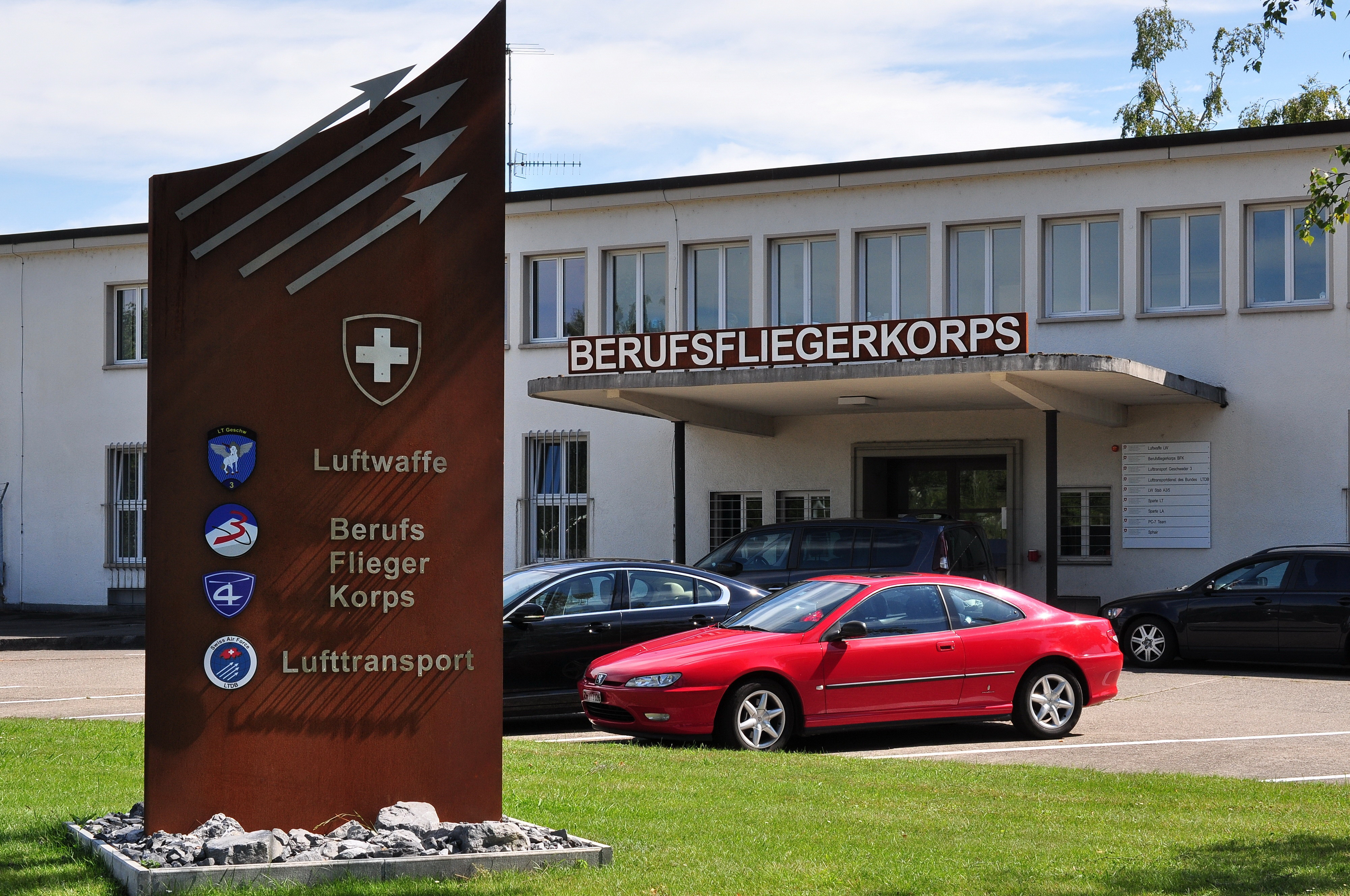
HQ of the Berufsfliegerkorps at Dübendorf AFB

The Berufsfliegerkorps (BFK) (English: professional flying corps, French: corps of the aviateurs professionnels, Italian: corpo degli aviatori di professione) are the professional pilots of the Swiss Air Force.

== History ==
In the early 20th century, Swiss military pilots were usually militia soldiers. During the Second World War there was a need for a permanent, professional association to maintain Swiss neutrality. On 4 April 1941, the Federal Council decided to create the Überwachungsgeschwader ("Surveillance Squadron").

The Überwachungsgeschwader was disbanded at the end of 2005 and its personnel transferred to the Berufsfliegerkorps. The command of the BFK is on the Dübendorf Air Base, at which today no combat aircraft are stationed.

The display teams Patrouille Suisse, Hornet Solodisplay, Superpuma Display and PC-7 Team are recruited from members of the corps belonging to various squadrons.
