= Eurocopter AS332 Super Puma =

Medium-lift helicopter series by Aerospatiale, later Airbus Helicopters

AS332 Super Puma H215
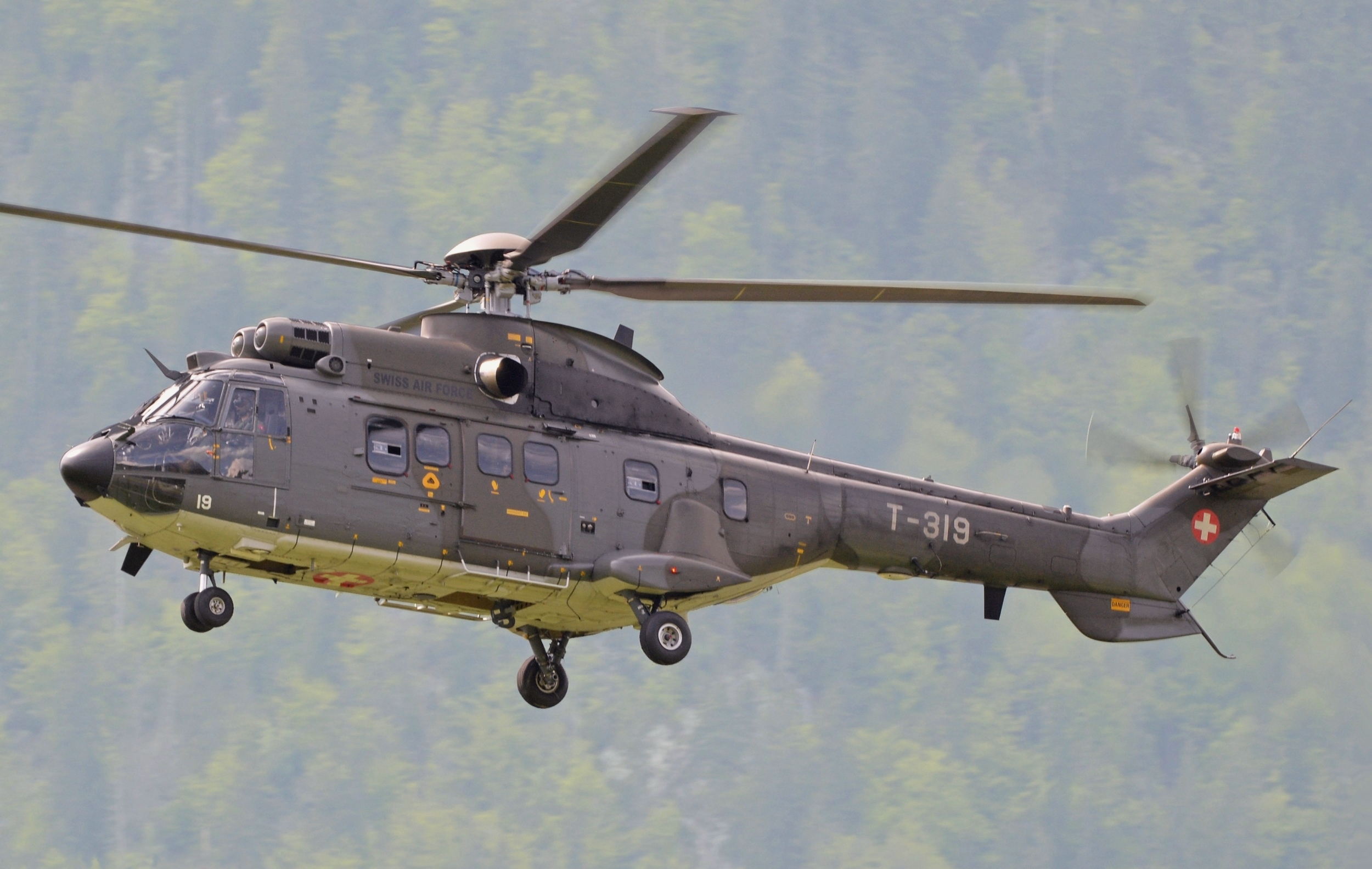
- AS332M1 Super Puma of the Swiss Air Force

General information
- Type: Medium utility helicopter
- National origin: France
- Manufacturer: Aérospatiale; Eurocopter; Airbus Helicopters
- Status: In service
- Primary users: French Air and Space Force CHC Helicopter; Babcock Mission Critical Services Offshore; Hellenic Air Force; Spanish Air and Space Force
- Number built: 1,000 (Sep 2019)

History
- Manufactured: 1978–present
- First flight: 13 September 1978
- Developed from: Aérospatiale SA 330 Puma
- Variant: Eurocopter AS532 Cougar
- Developed into: Eurocopter EC225 Super Puma; KAI KUH-1 Surion

The Airbus Helicopters H215 (formerly Eurocopter AS332 Super Puma) is a four-bladed, twin-engined, medium-sized, utility helicopter developed and initially produced by French aerospace company Aérospatiale. It has been subsequently manufactured by the successor companies Eurocopter and Airbus Helicopters. The Super Puma is a re-engined and larger version of the original Aérospatiale SA 330 Puma. The military version is the Airbus Helicopters H215M, previously known as the Eurocopter AS532 Cougar.

The Super Puma was developed during the 1970s, based on the successful SA 330 Puma. While retaining a similar layout, the fuselage was redesigned to increase its damage tolerance and crashworthiness, and composite materials were more extensively used. A pair of more powerful Turbomeca Makila turboshaft engines was used, the nose was more streamlined, and there were other changes. Two alternative fuselage lengths, a shortened and stretched form, were developed from the onset. On 5 September 1977, the SA 331 preproduction prototype performed its maiden flight; the first true Super Puma made its first flight roughly one year later.

By 1980, the Super Puma had succeeded the SA 330 Puma as Aérospatiale's principal utility helicopter. The Super Puma quickly proved itself to be a commercial success for both military and civilian customers. The French Army was a keen early customer, using the type in its then-new rapid-response task force, and routinely dispatching Super Pumas to support France's overseas engagements in Africa and the Middle East. From 1990, Super Pumas in military service were marketed under the AS532 Cougar name.

In the civilian sector, it has been heavily used to support offshore oil rigs and aerial firefighting. A next-generation successor to the AS 332 was introduced in 2004, the further-enlarged Eurocopter EC225 Super Puma for civilian use and EC225M for militaries.

== Development ==
=== Origins ===
During 1974, Aérospatiale commenced development of a new medium transport helicopter based on its successful SA 330 Puma. The project's existence was publicly announced at the 1975 Paris Air Show. While the new design retained a similar general layout to the preceding AS 330, it was powered by a pair of Turbomeca Makila turboshaft engines, which had recently been developed and were more powerful than the preceding Turbomeca Turmo. The rotorcraft's four-bladed main rotor was redesigned to make use of composite materials. The design team paid substantial attention to increasing the new model's damage resistance; a more robust fuselage structure and a new crashworthy undercarriage were adopted, the rotor blades are able to withstand some battle damage, and various other key mechanical systems were modified.

External features that distinguish the new helicopter from the SA 330 include a ventral fin underneath the tail boom and a more streamlined nose. From the project's onset, it had been planned for the new rotorcraft to be available in two fuselage lengths: a short-fuselage version with similar capacity to the SA 330 while providing superior performance under "hot and high" conditions, and a stretched version which allowed more internal cargo or passengers to be carried in circumstances where overall weight was deemed to be less critical.

On 5 September 1977, a preproduction prototype, the SA 331, modified from a SA 330 airframe by the addition of Makila engines and a new gearbox, performed its maiden flight. The first prototype of the full Super Puma made its first flight on 13 September 1978, and was quickly followed by a further five prototypes. Flight testing found that the AS 332 Super Puma had a higher cruise speed and more range than the SA 330 Puma, in part due to the Makila engine providing greater power output, and also a 17% reduction in fuel consumption. The Super Puma was also far more stable in flight, and was less reliant on automated corrective systems. The development of military and civilian variants was carried out in parallel, including at the certification stage. During 1981, the first civil Super Puma was delivered.

=== Production and improvements ===
By 1980, the AS 332 Super Puma had replaced the preceding SA 330 Puma as Aérospatiale's principal utility helicopter. It quickly proved to be highly popular amongst its customers; between July 1981 and April 1987, on average, three helicopters per month were being built for operators from both the military and civilian sectors. The success of the AS 332 Super Puma led to the pursuit of additional development programs that produced further advanced models. These included the introduction of features including lengthened rotor blades, more powerful engines and gearboxes, increases in takeoff weight, and modernised avionics. Overseas manufacturing was established; Indonesian Aerospace (IPTN) produced both the SA 330 and AS 332 under license from Aerospatiale; IPTN-build rotorcraft were produced for both domestic and some overseas customers.

A wide variety of specialised Super Puma variants followed the basic utility transport model into operation, including dedicated search-and-rescue (SAR) and antisubmarine warfare (ASW) versions. Since 1990, military-orientated Super Pumas have been marketed under the AS532 Cougar name. As a fallback option to the NHIndustries NH90 programme, a Mark III Super Puma was considered for development at one stage. By 2005, various models of Super Puma had been operated by numerous customers across 38 nations for a wide variety of purposes. 565 Super Pumas (including military-orientated Cougars) had been delivered or were on order at this time.

During February 2012, Eurocopter announced that it was offering a lower-cost basic Super Puma configuration that would be more competitive with rivals such as the Russian-built Mil Mi-17. Starlite Aviation became the launch customer for this new variant, designated AS 332 C1e. In November 2015, Airbus Helicopters announced that manufacturing activity of the AS 332 Super Puma, which was redesignated H215, would be transferred to a new purpose-built final-assembly facility in Brasov, Romania to cut production time and cost by simplifying production to a single baseline configuration that would then be customised to meet the needs of civilian and military customers.

== Design ==
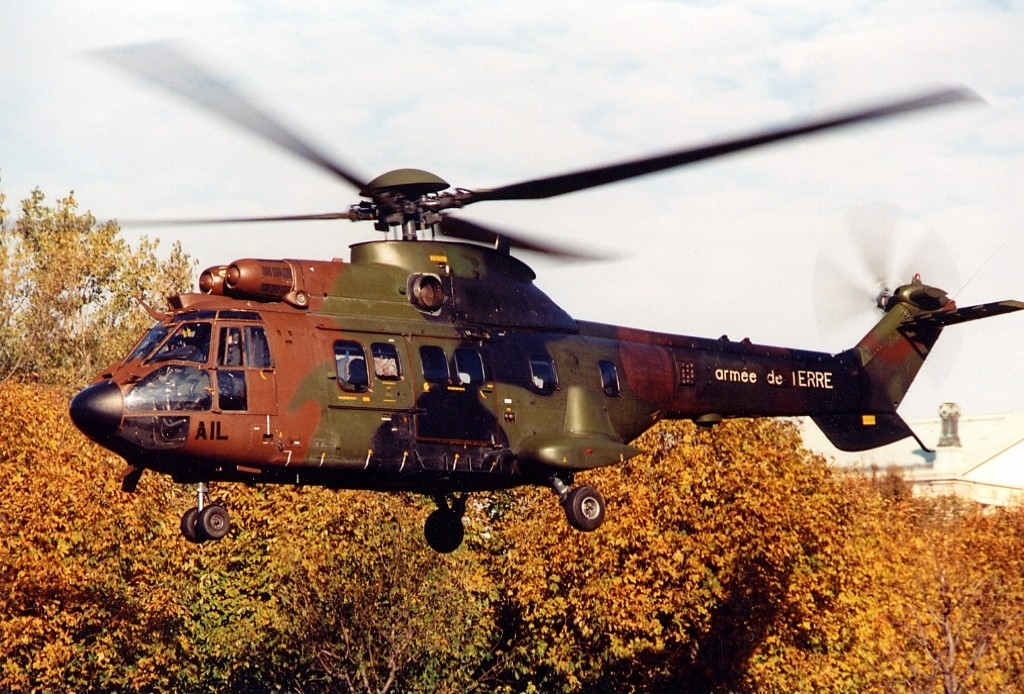
A French Army AS332 Super Puma, 1999

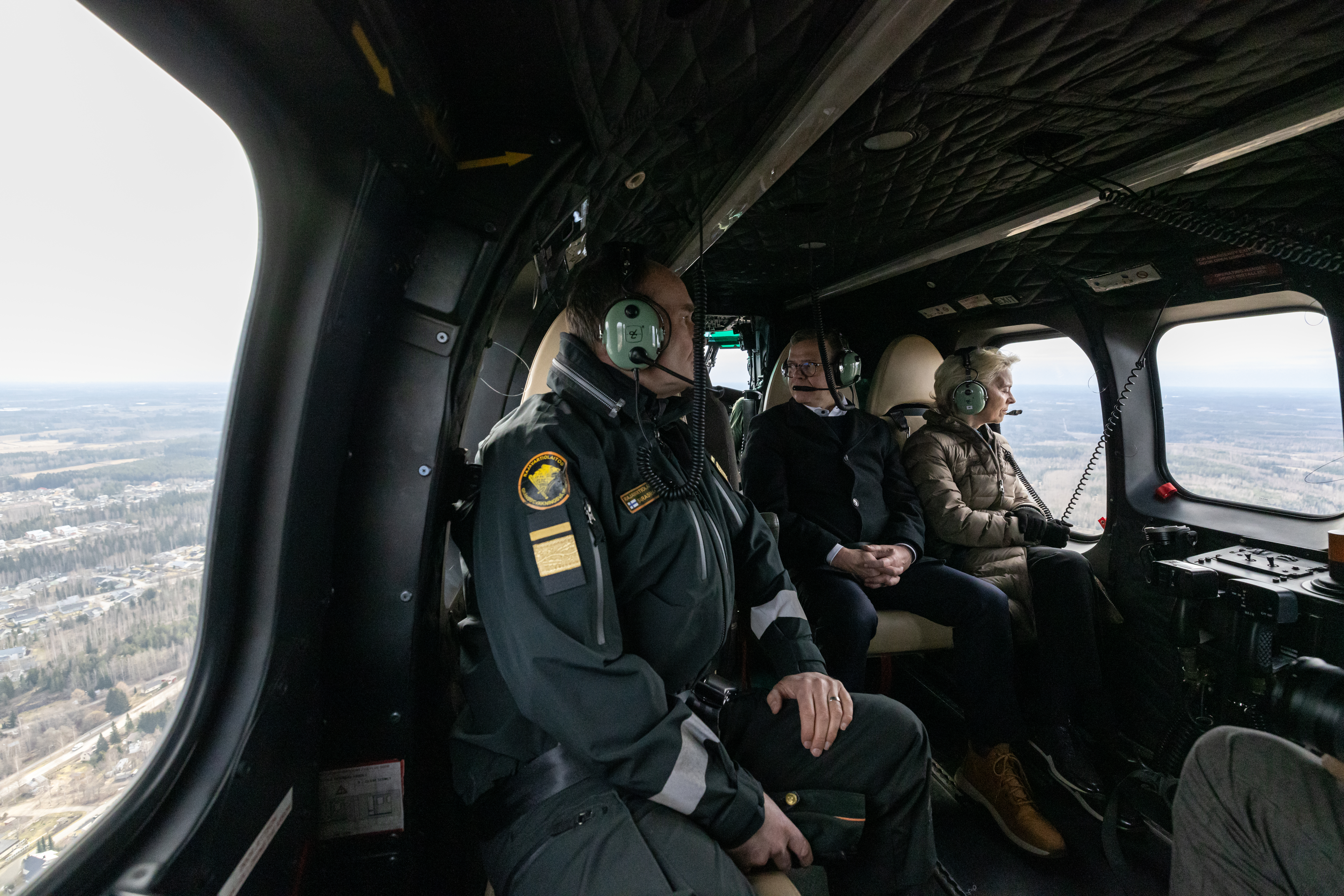
Interior of a Finnish Border Guard H215, 2024

The Eurocopter AS332 Super Puma is a medium-sized utility helicopter, powered by a pair of Turbomeca Makila 1A1 turboshaft engines, which drive the rotorcraft's four-bladed main rotor and five-bladed tail rotor along with a pair of independent hydraulic systems and a pair of electrical alternators. Fuel is housed across six internal fuel tanks, while additional auxiliary and external tanks can be equipped for extended flight endurance. For safety, the fuel tanks use a crashworthy plumbing design and fire-detection and suppression systems are installed in the engine bay. The monocoque tail boom is fitted with tail rotor strike protection; the forward portion of the boom also accommodates a luggage compartment. The retractable tricycle landing gear has been designed to provide high energy-absorption qualities.

The main cabin of the Super Puma, which is accessed via a pair of sliding plug doors, features a reconfigurable floor arrangement that enables various passenger seating or cargo configurations to be adopted, which includes specialised configurations for medical operators. According to Airbus Helicopters, in addition to the two pilots, the short-fuselage AS332 can accommodate up to 15 passengers, while the stretched-fuselage AS332 increases this to 20 passengers in a comfortable configuration. Soundproof upholstery is installed, as is separately-adjustable heating and ventilation systems. In addition to the doors, 12 windows line the sides of main cabin area, these are jettisonable to become emergency exits if required. The lower fuselage can also be fitted with flotation gear to give the rotorcraft additional buoyancy. A hatch is set into the cabin floor which facilitates access to the cargo sling pole, in addition to individual stowage space for airborne equipment.

The flight control system of the Super Puma uses four dual-body servo units for pitch control of the cyclic, collective, and tail rotor. A duplex digital autopilot is also incorporated. The cockpit is equipped with dual flight controls. Principle instrumentation consists of four multifunction liquid crystal displays along with two display and autopilot control panels; for redundancy, a single integrated standby instrument system and vehicle monitoring system are also fitted. According to Airbus Helicopters, the avionics installed on later variants has ensured a high level of operational safety. Third-party firms have offered various upgrades for the Super Puma, including integrated flight management systems, global positioning systems receivers, a digital map display, flight data recorders, a collision warning system, night-vision goggles-compatibility, and multiple radios.

A marine variant of the Super Puma has been manufactured for anti-submarine and anti-surface warfare. In this configuration the Super Puma is modified with additional corrosion protection, a folding tail rotor boom, a deck-landing guidance system, sonar equipment, and the nose-mounted Omera search radar. For the anti-surface role, as of 1987 it could be armed with a pair of Exocet anti-ship missiles.

== Operational history ==
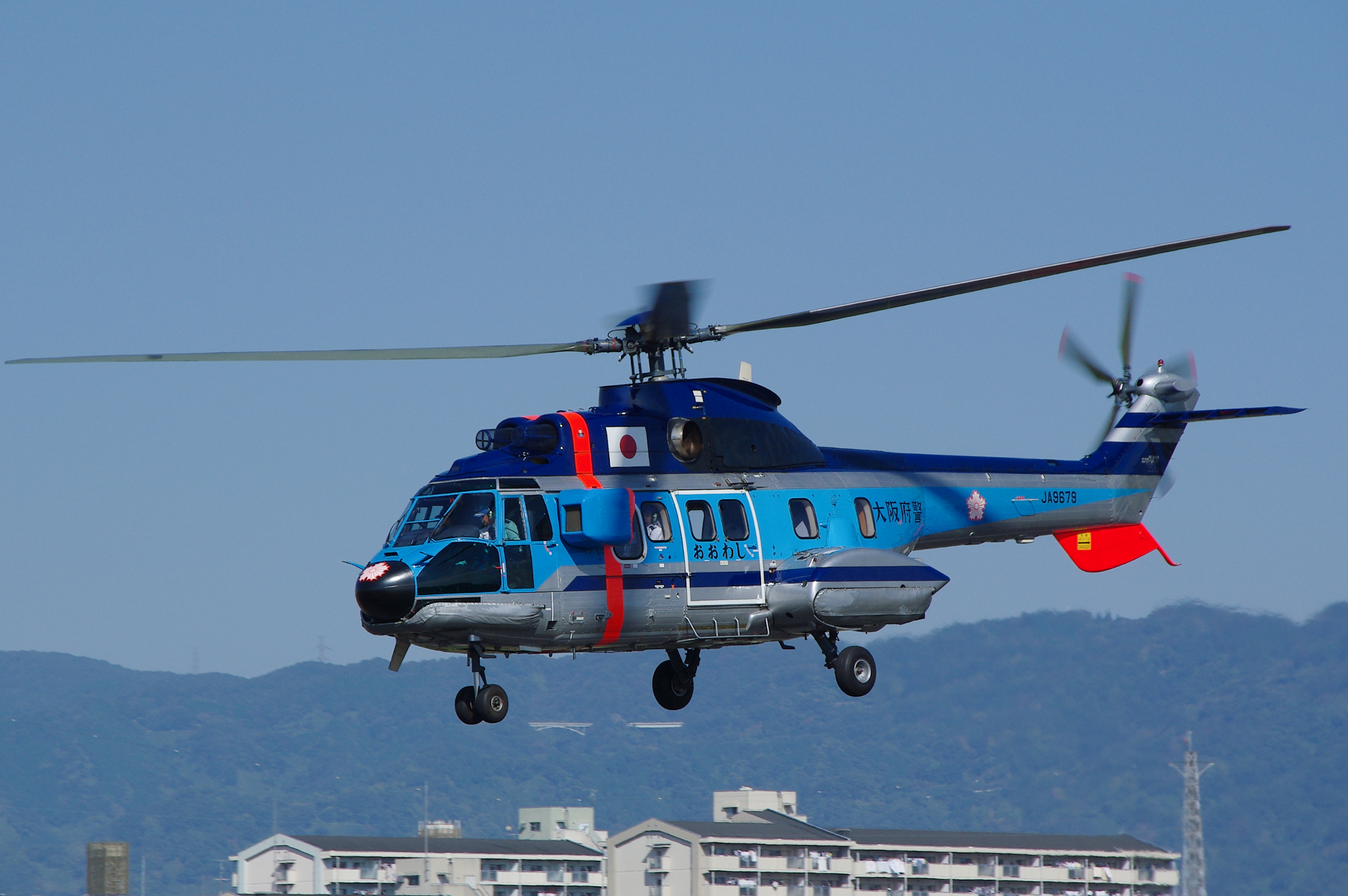
An AS332 Super Puma of the Osaka Prefectural Police, 2009

In August 1983, the French government created a new rapid-response task force, the Force d'Action Rapide, to support France's allies and to contribute to France's overseas engagements in Africa and the Middle East; up to 30 Super Pumas were assigned to it. In June 1994, France staged a military intervention in the ongoing Rwandan genocide, dispatching a military task force to neighboring Zaire; Super Pumas provided the bulk of the task force's rotary-lift capability, transporting French troops and equipment during their advance into Rwanda.

During the 1980s, the French Army were interested in mounting an airborne battlefield surveillance radar upon the Super Puma. The first prototype Orchidée was assembled at Aérospatiale's Marignane factory and began testing in late 1988; the French Army intended to procure 20 aircraft to equip two squadrons. Orchidée was described as having a pulse-Doppler radar mounted on the fuselage's underside, capable of 360° scanning to detect low-flying helicopters and ground vehicles at ranges of up to 150 km; gathered data were to be relayed in real time to mobile ground stations by a single-channel data link for processing and analysis before being transmitted to battlefield commanders. The system was said to be capable of all-weather operation, and would counteract hostile electronic countermeasures. However, development was aborted in mid-1990 during post-Cold War defence spending reductions.

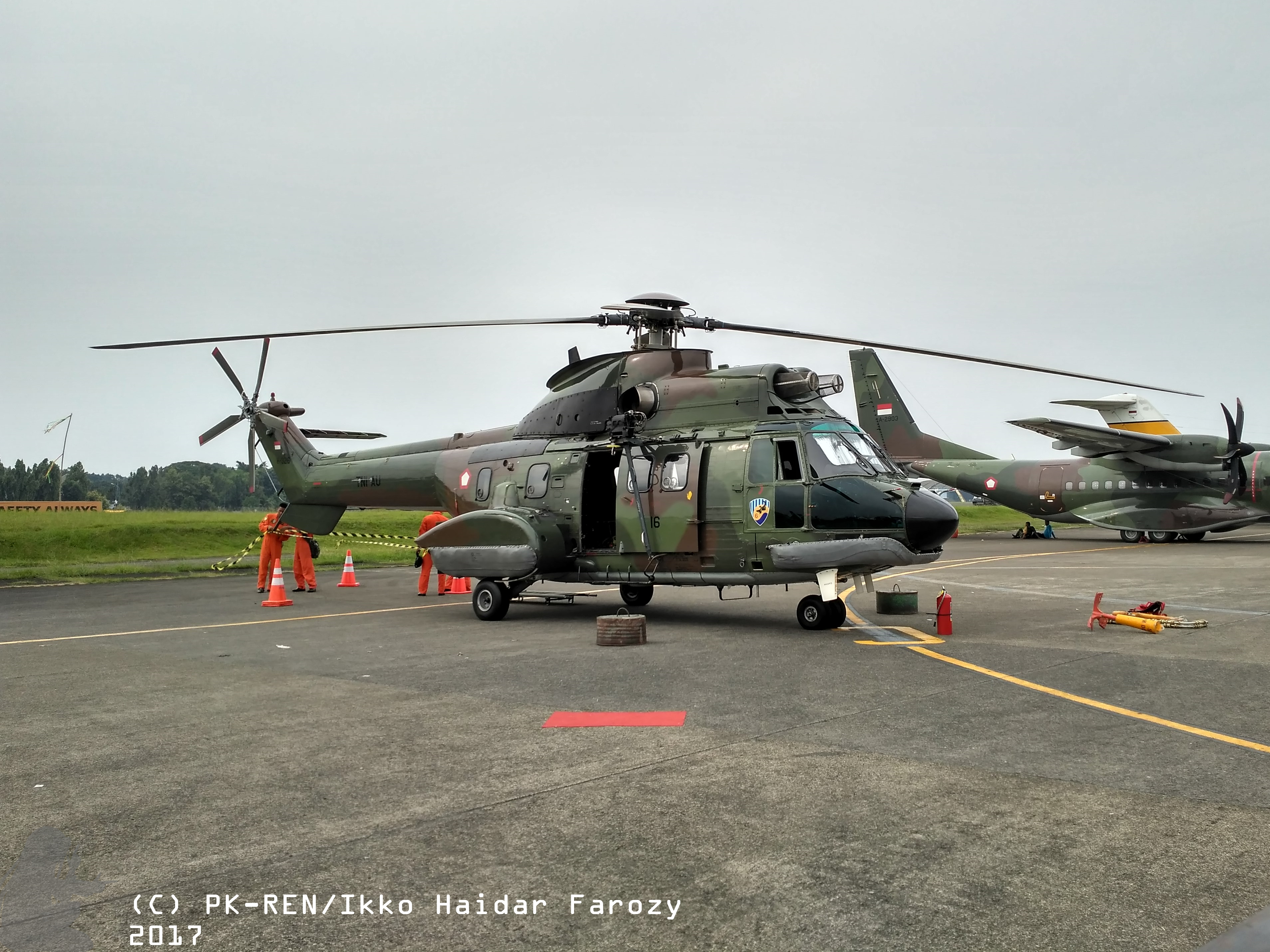
An Indonesian Super Puma in 2017

Indonesia has been a key customer for the Super Puma; state-owned aircraft manufacturer PT Dirgantara Indonesia (PT DI) secured a license to produce the type. While the company was initially involved in the assembly and finishing of Super Pumas delivered from Europe, PT DI has expanded the range of its manufacturing involvement in the type over time, while also expanding its collaboration with Eurocopter. In 1989, the Indonesian Air Force placed an order for 16 Super Pumas as a replacement for its ageing Sikorsky S-58T fleet, but amid continued funding shortfalls, only seven units had been delivered by 2008, the operations of which were reportedly hampered by a lack of spare parts. The Indonesian government had also ordered 16 Super Pumas for purposes such as VIP transport, seven of which had been delivered by 2008. These helicopters were manufactured locally by PT DI.

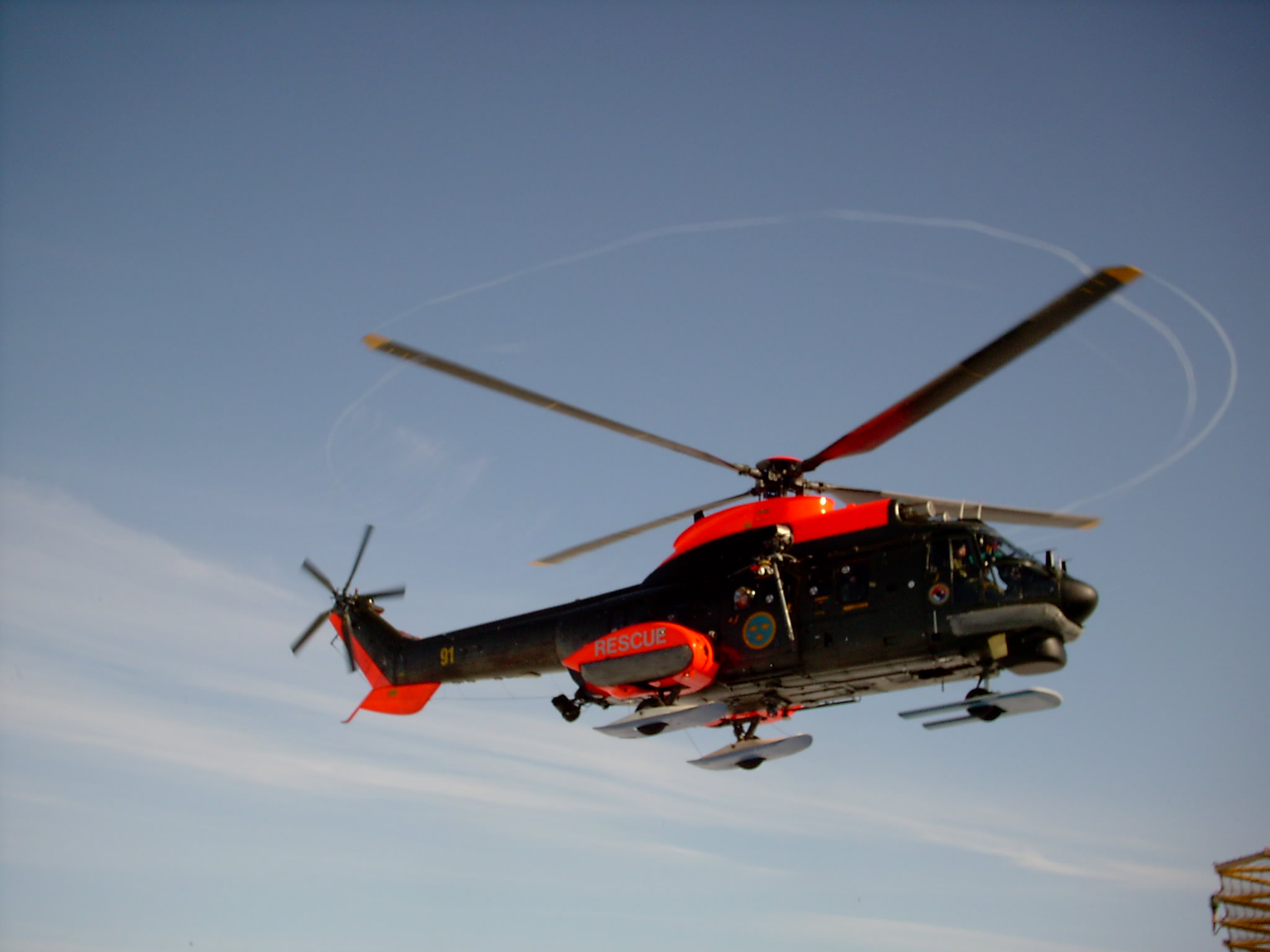
A Swedish AS332, 2004

A key export customer was Switzerland, which had originally purchased fifteen AS 332M1 Super Pumas, locally designated TH89, for the Swiss Air Force. These were subsequently joined by 11 AS 532UL Cougars, designated TH98, while the TH06 programme was launched in 2006 to retrofit the earlier Super Puma fleet with new avionics that equalled or exceeded the capabilities of the newer Cougar fleet by RUAG. The Swiss Air Force has typically deployed the type for intelligence, surveillance, target acquisition, and reconnaissance and search-and-rescue (SAR) missions. Swiss Super Pumas have occasionally been deployed outside the country, usually to provide humanitarian aid, such as a deployment to Greece for aerial firefighting in August 2021.

During 1988, Sweden arranged to procure a fleet of 12 Super Pumas; they were primarily operated domestically, although some were deployed overseas occasionally, such as to provide medical evacuation services to coalition forces engaged in the war in Afghanistan. In October 2015, the Swedish Air Force retired its last Super Puma, replacing it with newer rotorcraft such as the NHIndustries NH90 and Sikorsky UH-60M Black Hawk. Six of the retired Super Pumas were sold and refurbished for further service with other operators.

During 1990, Nigeria made a deal with Aerospatiale to exchange several of their Pumas for larger Super Pumas. In November 2009, an additional five used Super Pumas were acquired from France for peacekeeping and surveillance operations in the Niger Delta. In 2015, it was reported that a number of weaponised Super Pumas had been procured by the Nigerian Air Force for anti-insurgency operations against Boko Haram. During 2000, a pair of Nigerian Super Pumas were deployed to in Cross River State to improve area surveillance and increase available firepower in response to insecurity in the vicinity of the Bakassi axis.

In late 1990s, the Hellenic Air Force issued a request to acquire more modern and capable SAR helicopters, to replace its ageing fleet of Agusta Bell AB-205 SAR helicopters, which were in use since 1975. The need for an all-weather, day and night, long range SAR helicopter for operations throughout the Athens FIR came up after the Imia/Kardak incident of 1996, and the growing tension between Greece and Turkey over territorial water disputes on the Aegean Sea. The Greek government signed a deal with Eurocopter for the purchase of an initial four AS-332 C1 Super Pumas in 1998. HAF acquired two more Super Pumas for air support operations of the Athens 2004 Olympic Games, and six more followed from 2007 to 2011 for the new CSAR role of the 384 SAR/CSAR Sq. All HAF Super Pumas are of the C1 version, which includes features such as a four-axis auto pilot, a NADIR type1000 navigation and mission management computer, FLIR turrets, an RBR1500B search radar, an engine anti-icing system, hydraulic and electrical hoists, a SPECTROLAB SX-16 searchlight, engine exhaust-gas deflectors, a Bertin loudspeaker, and six-stretcher interior configuration for MEDEVAC missions.

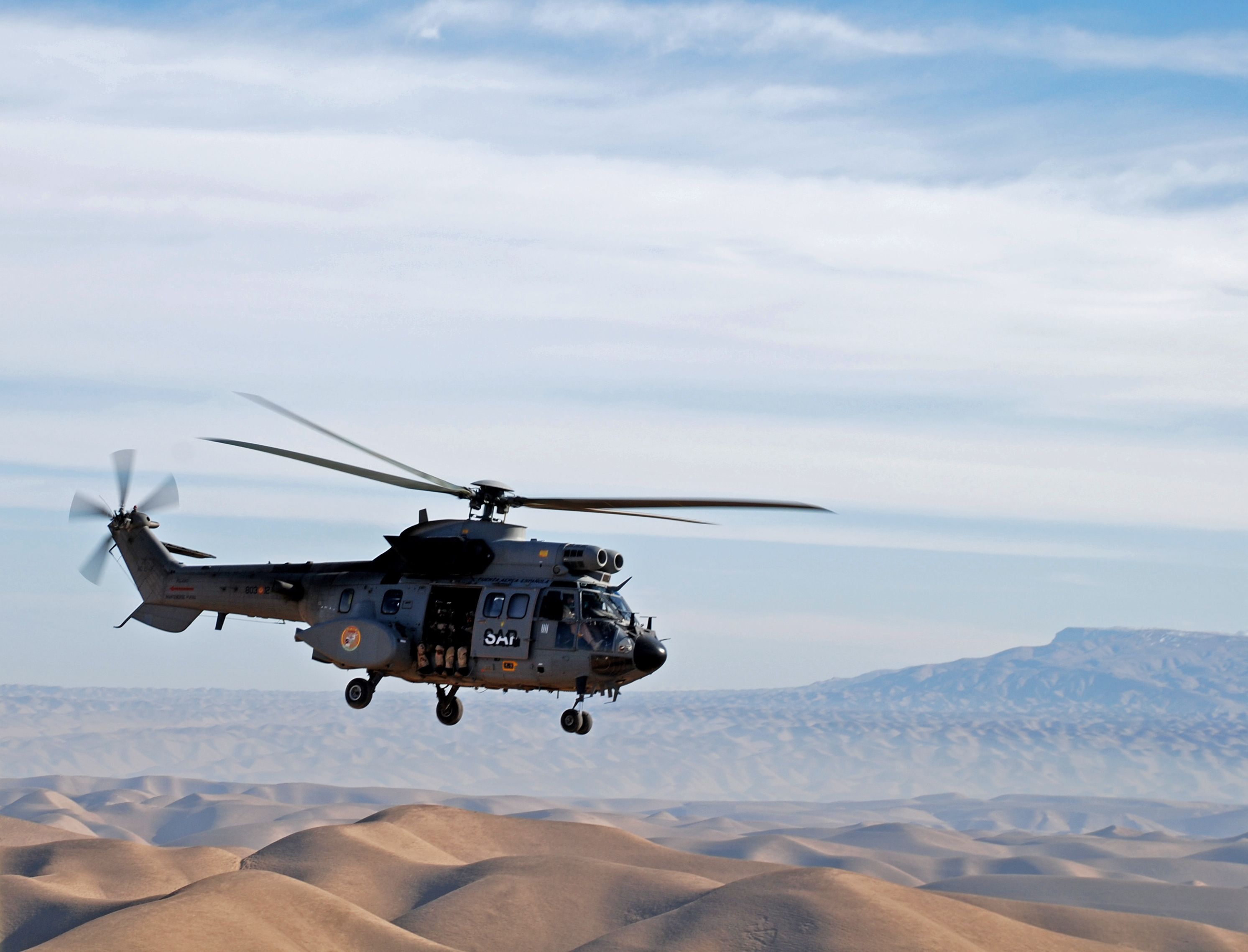
AS332 of the Spanish Air Force conducting a medevac over Herat Province, Afghanistan, 2008

The Spanish Air Force operated Super Pumas for various purposes. The fleet participated in the war in Afghanistan between 2005 and 2011, at one point being the sole rotorcraft providing combat SAR and MEDEVAC cover in Afghanistan's western regions, the last of these were withdrawn in November 2013. The type has also been used domestically for firefighting. During the 2010s, Spain decided to replace its Super Puma with the newer NH90, the first of which was delivered in 2020.

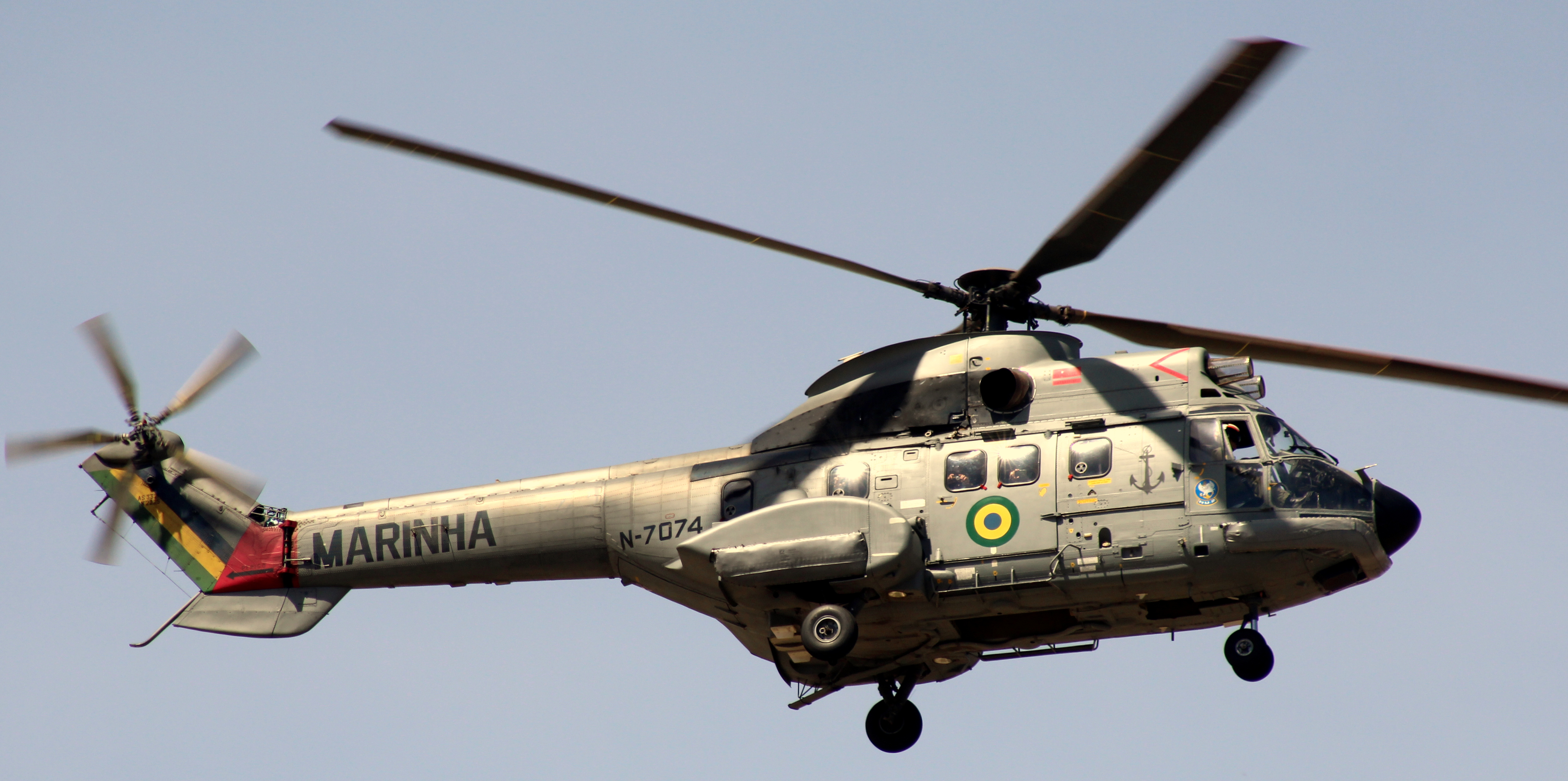
A Brazilian Navy Super Puma

VH-34 is the Brazilian Air Force's designation for the helicopter used to transport the President of Brazil. A pair of modified Super Pumas, configured to carry up to 15 passengers and three crew members, were used as the main presidential helicopters. The VH-34 model was progressively supplemented and later replaced by the VH-36, the later EC725. Several French presidents, including François Mitterrand, have used military Super Pumas for official transport during diplomatic missions. During 2008, British Prime Minister Gordon Brown was flown in a Super Puma during a tour of Iraq.

The Super Puma has reportedly proven to be well-suited to offshore operations for the North Sea oil industry, where the type has been used to ferry personnel and equipment to and from oil platforms. One of the biggest civilian operators of the Super Puma is Bristow Helicopters, which had a fleet of at least 30 Super Pumas in 2005; CHC Helicopters is another large civil operator, having possessed a fleet of 56 Super Pumas in 2014. During the 1990s, Iran procured at least seven Indonesian-built Super Pumas for civil offshore oil exploration missions. Super Pumas are also operated by Petrobras, the largest energy company in Brazil, to support its long-distance oil rigs. The largest civilian helicopter operator in China, CITIC Offshore Helicopter, operates a sizeable Super Puma fleet. At least 19 Super Pumas were operated by Germany's Federal Police service as of 2018.

The Finnish Border Guard has operated numerous AS332 L1 Super Pumas equipped for maritime reconnaissance and SAR operations throughout the country. To better suit the challenging prevailing conditions, they are typically fitted with forward-looking infrared, a four-axis autopilot, and de-icing apparatus. During the late 2010s, older members of Finland's Super Puma fleet were transported to Romania to be modernised and equipped to the newer H215 standard.

In 2014, Airbus Helicopters, the manufacturer of the type, stated that the Super Puma/Cougar family had delivered 890 to customers across 56 nations. By 2015, 187 Super Pumas had reportedly been ordered by military customers; amongst others, the orders included 29 for Argentina, 30 for Spain, 33 for Indonesia, 22 for Singapore and 12 for Greece.

In November 2017, Romania announced its intention to buy up to 16 helicopters, and planned to make a 30% down payment towards the first four aircraft that year.

== Variants ==
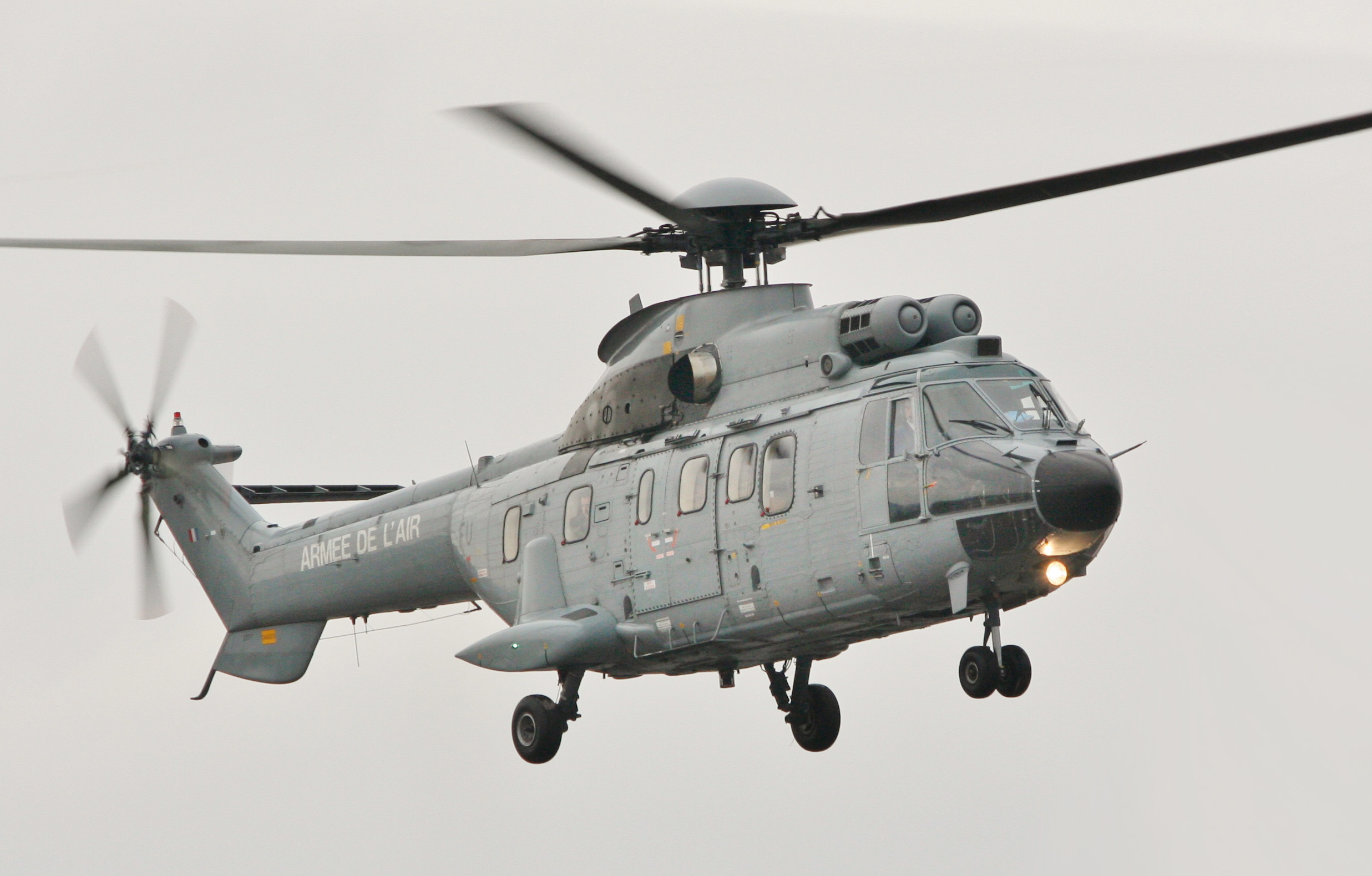
Eurocopter AS332 Super Puma (Defense Minister of France)

- SA 331 – Initial prototype, based on SA 330 airframe, first flew on 5 September 1977
- AS 332A – Commercial preproduction version
- AS 332B – Military version
- AS 332B1 – First military version
- AS 332C – Production civilian version
- AS 332C1 – SAR version, equipped with a search radar and six stretchers
- AS 332F – Military antisubmarine and antiship version
- AS 332F1 – Naval version
- AS 332L – Civilian version with more powerful engines, a lengthened fuselage, a larger cabin space, and a larger fuel tank
- AS 332L1 – Stretched civilian version, with a long fuselage and an airline interior
- AS 332L2 Super Puma Mk 2 – Civilian transport version, fitted with Spheriflex rotor head and EFIS
- AS 332M – Military version of the AS 332L
- AS 332M1 – Stretched military version
- NAS 332 – Licensed version built by IPTN, now Indonesian Aerospace PT DI
- UH-14 – Brazilian Navy designation of the AS 332F.
- CH-34 – Brazilian Air Force designation of the AS 332M.
- VH-34 – Brazilian Air Force designation of the VIP-configured AS 332M1.
- H.9 – (Thai: ฮ.๙) Royal Thai Armed Forces designation for the AS 332L2.

== Operators ==
=== Civilian ===
Civilian operators
Country	Airlines
Azerbaijan	Azerbaijan Airlines
Brazil	Petrobras
Canada	CHC Helicopter; Horizon Helicopters
China	CITIC Offshore Helicopter
Germany	German Federal Police
Greece	Hellenic Fire Service - Operates two AS332L.1s.
Hong Kong	Government Flying Service
Iceland	Icelandic Coast Guard
Japan	Coast Guard; Tokyo Fire Department
Norway	Lufttransport
Serbia	Serbian Police
Ukraine	State Emergency Service of Ukraine
United Kingdom	Bond Offshore Helicopters; Bristow Helicopters; CHC Scotia
United States	Los Angeles County Sheriff's Department; Precision Helicopters
Vietnam	Southern Vietnam Helicopter Company

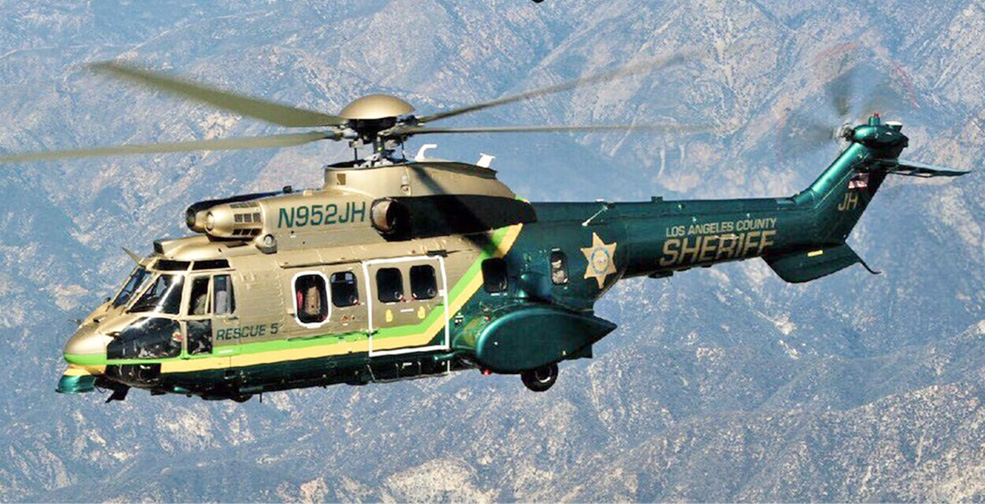
An L.A. County Sheriff's Department Super Puma flying a SAR mission

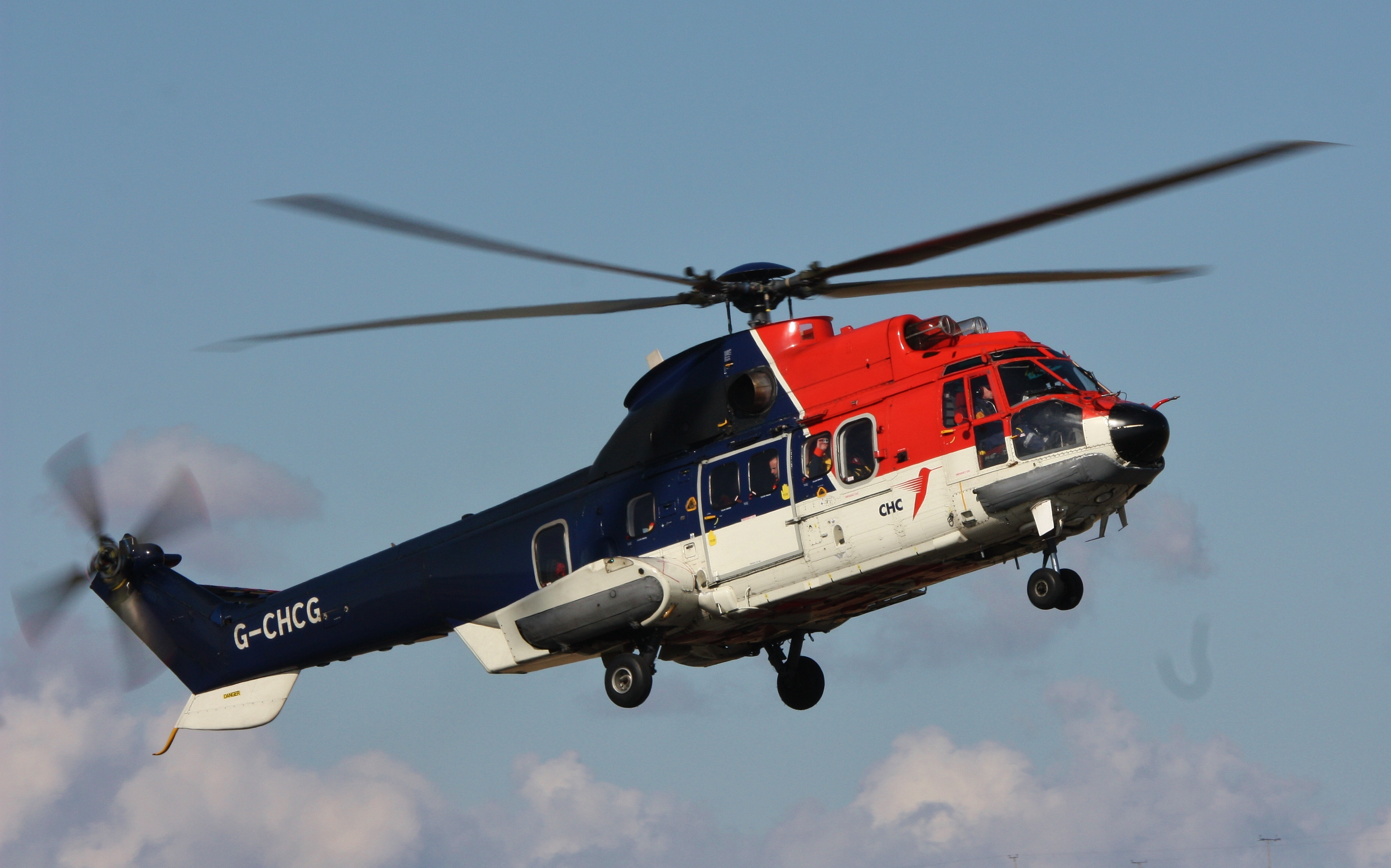
A CHC AS332L2 Super Puma

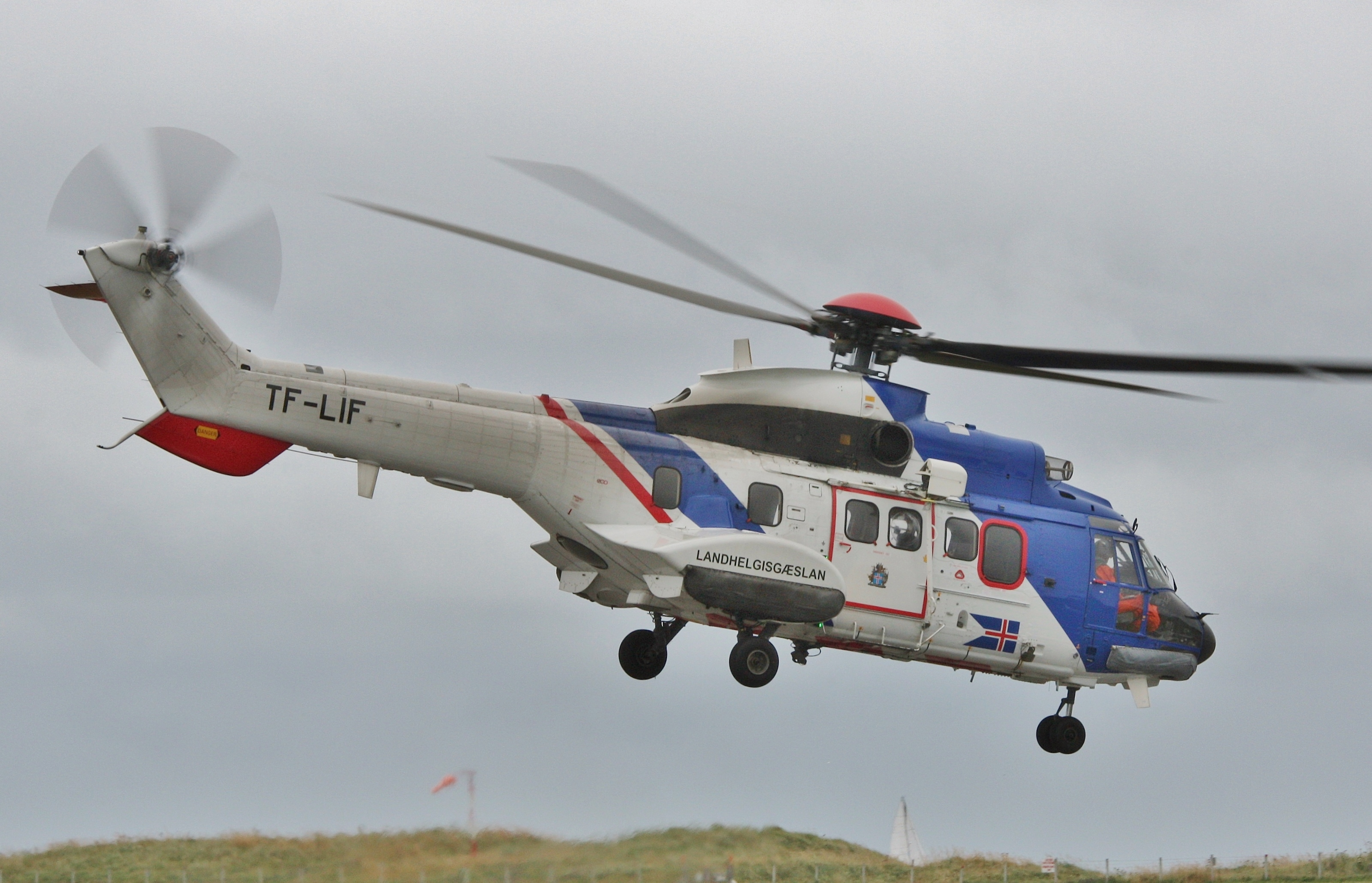
AS 332, named Líf, of the Icelandic Coast Guard

=== Military ===
Military operators
Country	Airlines
Albania	Albanian air force
Argentina	Argentine Army Aviation
Bolivia	Bolivian Air Force
Brazil	Brazilian Army Aviation
Chile	Chilean Navy
Ecuador	Ecuadorian Army
Finland	Finnish Border Guard
France	French Air and Space Force
Gabon	Gabonese Air Force
Georgia	Ministry of Defense
Greece	Hellenic Air Force
Indonesia	Indonesian Air Force
Jordan	Royal Jordanian Air Force
Kuwait	Kuwait Air Force
Lebanon	Lebanese Air Force
Mali	Mali Air Force
Morocco	Royal Moroccan Gendarmerie
Nigeria	Nigerian Air Force
Oman	Royal Air Force of Oman
Saudi Arabia	Royal Saudi Navy
South Korea	Republic of Korea Air Force
Spain	Spanish Air and Space Force
Switzerland	Swiss Air Force
United Arab Emirates	United Arab Emirates Air Force
Ukraine	National Guard of Ukraine
Uzbekistan	Uzbekistan Air Force
Venezuela	Venezuelan Air Force

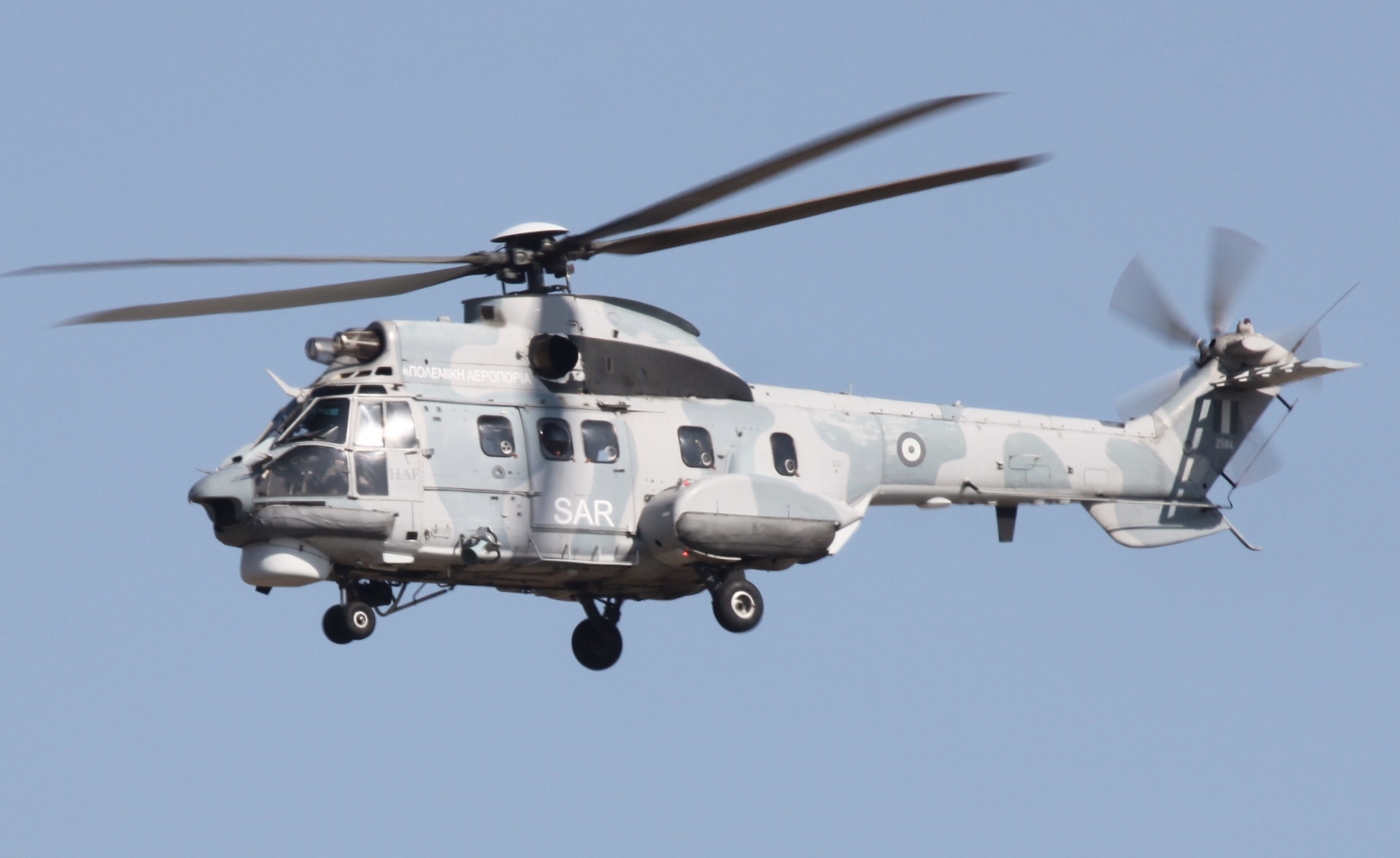
AS 332 of the Hellenic Air Force

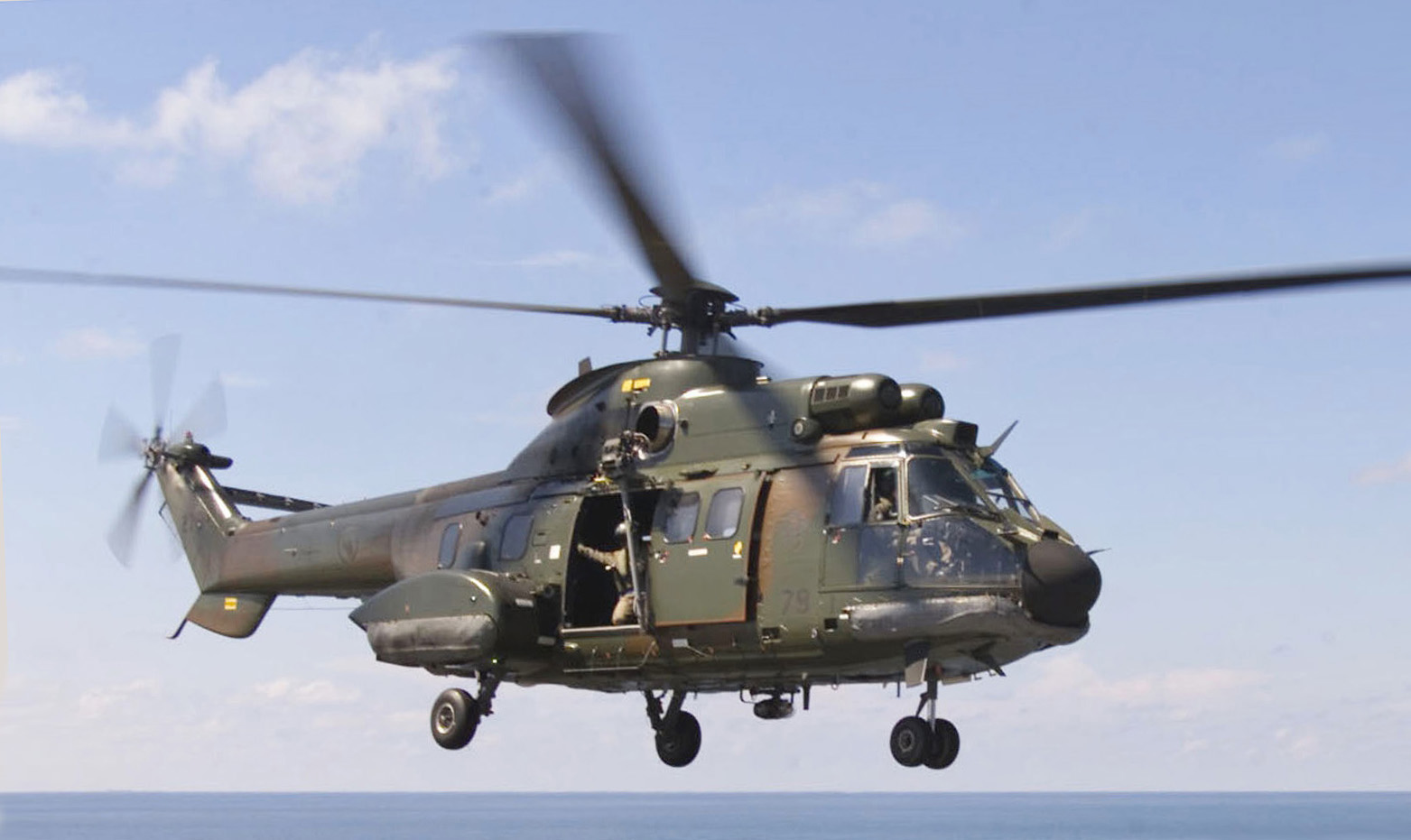
A Singapore Air Force Super Puma approaching USS Inchon

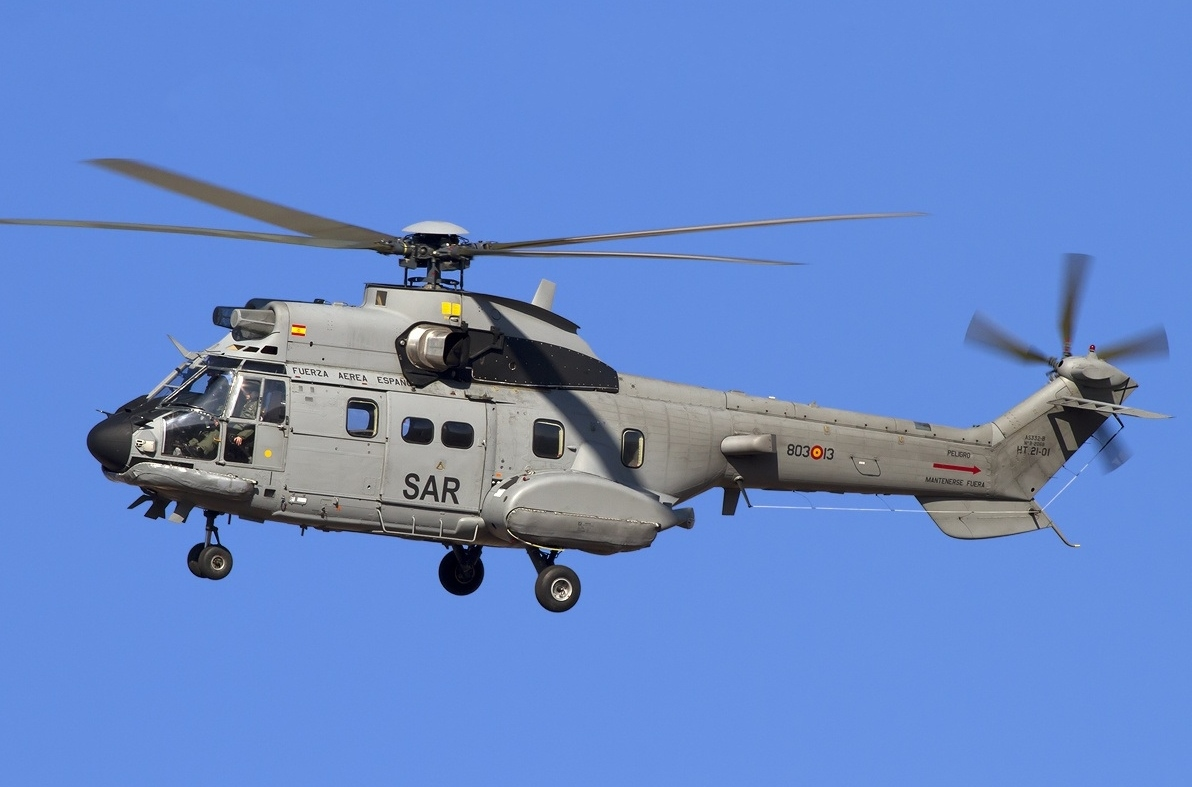
AS 332 of the Spanish Air Force

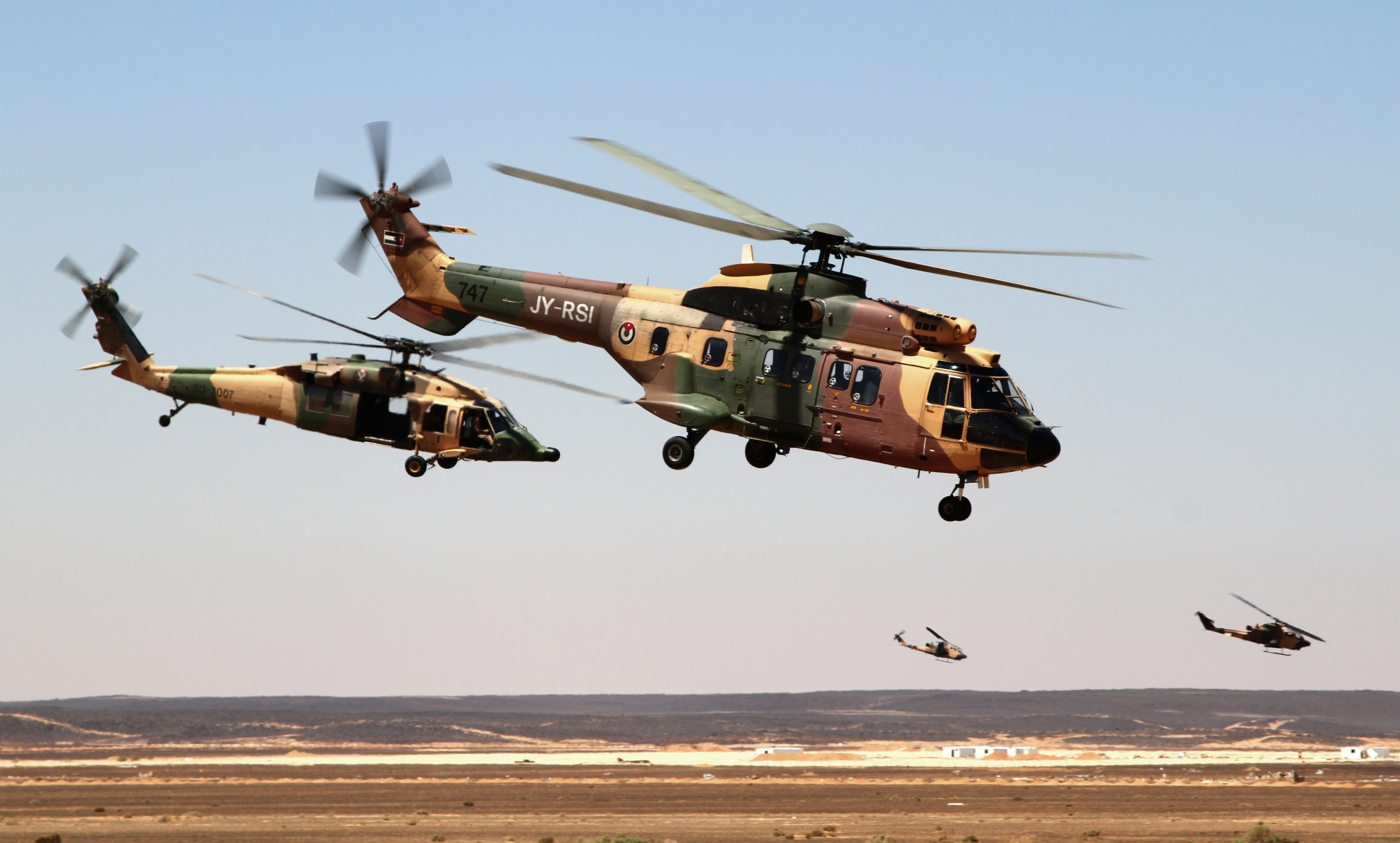
Royal Jordanian Air Force Super Puma

==== Former operators ====
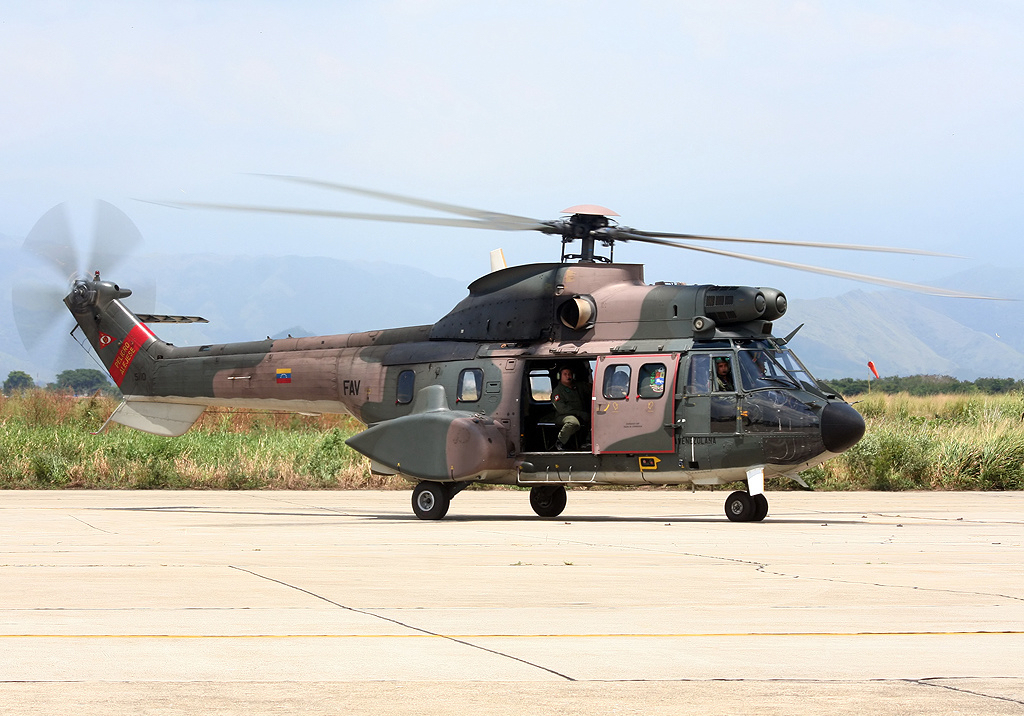
AS 332B1 Super Puma of Venezuela Air Force

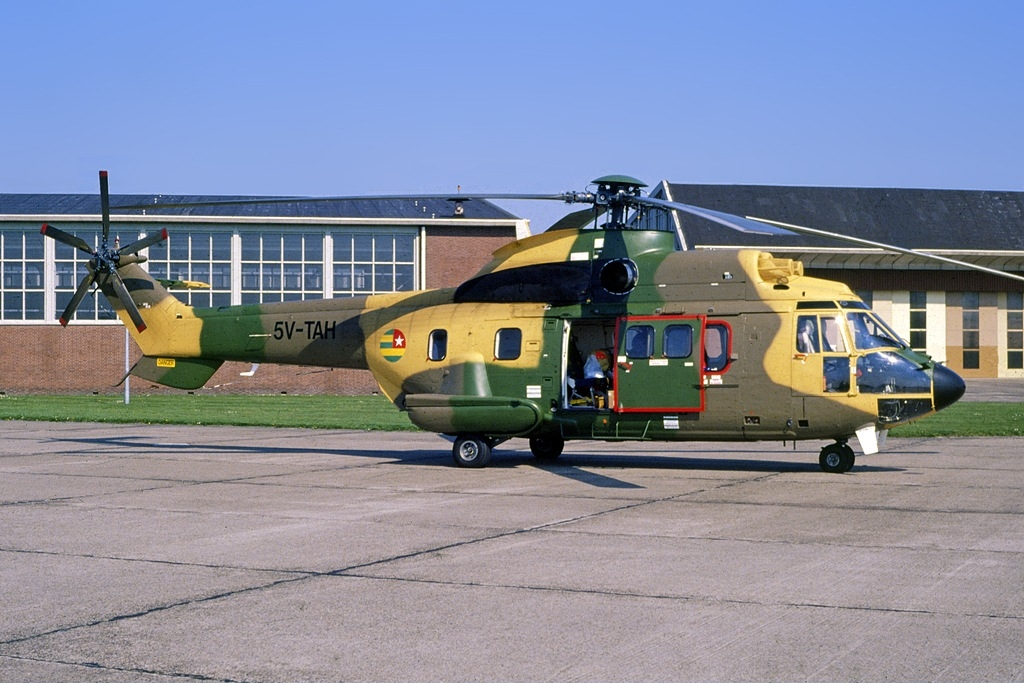
A Togolese Super Puma in 1990

Former operators
Country	Airlines
Brazil	Brazilian Air Force Brazilian Naval Aviation
Cameroon	Cameroon Air Force
China	People's Liberation Army Ground Force
Democratic Republic of the Congo	Congolese Democratic Air Force
Indonesia	Indonesian Navy
Japan	Japan Ground Self-Defense Force
Sweden	Swedish Air Force
Thailand	Royal Thai Air Force
Singapore	Republic of Singapore Air Force
Togo	Togolese Air Force
United Kingdom	Royal Air Force

== Notable accidents and incidents ==
- 16 July 1988 – an AS332 L operated by Helikopter Service AS ditched in the North Sea due to heavy vibrations caused by the loss of a metal strip from one of the main rotor blades. All passengers and crew survived.
- 14 March 1992 – G-TIGH lost control and crashed into the North Sea near East Shetland Basin; 11 of the 17 passengers and crew died.
- 19 January 1995 – G-TIGK, operating Bristow Helicopters Flight 56C, ditched in the North Sea, after being hit by an abnormally large lightning strike; there were no fatalities, but the aircraft was written off.
- 18 January 1996 – LN-OBP, an AS332 L1 operated by Helikopter Service AS, ditched in the North Sea some 200 km south-west of Egersund. All passengers and crew survived and the helicopter was still floating 3 days later.
- 18 March 1996 – LN-OMC, an AS332 operated by Airlift from Svalbard Airport crashed at Wijdefjorden. There were no fatalities
- 8 September 1997 – LN-OPG, an AS332 L1 operated by Helikopter Service AS, suffered a catastrophic main gearbox failure and crashed en route from Brønnøysund to the Norne oil field, killing all 12 aboard. Eurocopter accepted some but not all of the AAIB/N recommendations.
- 11 August 2000 - Kaskasapakte, Sweden. A Swedish Air Force AS332M1 (10404 / H94) crashed into the mountainside during initial approach to perform hoisting operations during a mountain rescue mission. All 3 crewmembers were killed. The cause of the accident was not fully determined, but difficult visual conditions is believed to have caused the crew to lose judgement of distance to the mountain side.
- 18 November 2003 - Rörö, Sweden. A Swedish Air Force AS332M1 (10409 / H99) crashed into the sea during a night-time hoist exercise near Rörö in Gothenburg's archipelago. The task was to conduct a number of hoist cycles to the rescue ship Märta Collin. On approach the aircraft suddenly hit the water at high velocity, killing six crew members. Only one crew member, a conscript rescue swimmer, survived with minor injuries. The cause of the accident was not fully determined, but was believed to have been the result of incorrect flight attitude awareness in bad weather.
- 21 November 2006 – A Eurocopter AS332 L2 SAR helicopter ditched in the North Sea. The aircraft was equipped with two automatic inflatable life rafts, but both failed to inflate. The Dutch Safety Board afterwards issued a warning.
- 1 April 2009 – A Bond Offshore Helicopters AS332L2 with 16 people on board crashed into the North Sea 13 miles (21 km) off Crimond on the Aberdeenshire coast; there were no survivors. The AAIB's initial report found that the crash was caused by a "catastrophic failure" in the aircraft's main rotor gearbox epicyclic module.
- 11 November 2011 – XC-UHP AS332-L Super Puma of Mexico's General Coordination of the Presidential Air Transport Unit crashed in the Amecameca region south of Mexico City. Mexico's Secretary of the Interior Francisco Blake Mora died in this accident along with seven other crew and passengers.
- 21 March 2013 – During a readiness exercise, a German Federal Police (Bundespolizei) Eurocopter EC155 collided with a Super Puma on the ground while landing in whiteout conditions next to the Olympic Stadium in Berlin, Germany, destroying both aircraft, killing one of the pilots, and injuring numerous bystanders. The whiteout was caused by snow on the ground being stirred up by the helicopter downdraft.
- 23 August 2013 – A Super Puma L2 helicopter G-WNSB experienced a (so far unexplained) loss of air speed on a low approach and ditched into the North Sea 2 miles (3.2 km) west of Sumburgh Airport around 18:20 BST. The aircraft experienced a hard impact and overturned shortly after hitting the water. However, its armed flotation system deployed and the aircraft stayed afloat. Four passengers were killed, while both crew and a further 12 passengers were rescued, most with injuries. To date, the AAIB stated it was not caused by mechanical failure. A court has ordered the CV/FDR be released to the UK CAA for analysis on behalf of the Crown Office.
- 28 September 2016 - Saint Gothard Pass region, Switzerland, A Swiss Air Force Super Puma struck a landline 50 metres (160 ft) after taking off, both pilots were killed and the loadmaster sustained undisclosed injuries but survived. The helicopter was a total loss as it burned out completely. After a lengthy investigation the pilots were found to not have been at fault.
- 19 March 2022 – During an attempted rescue in Azusa, California, a Los Angeles County Sheriff's Department Eurocopter AS332L1, N950SG struck a tree and rolled onto its left side. The helicopter was destroyed. Four people on board were seriously injured, and two were left with minor injuries as a result. The determined probable cause of the collision according to the NTSB were the pilot's failure to maintain clearance from a tree after encountering brownout conditions and a loss of visual reference during the approach to land.
- 20 September 2026 - An Airbus AS332 L1 Super Puma helicopter (N332N) crashed while conducting a water drop on the Dome Fire, after collecting water from Ostrander Lake. Both pilots were killed.

== Specifications (AS332 L1) ==

Data from Jane's All The World's Aircraft 1993–94

General characteristics

- Crew: 2
- Capacity: 24 passengers plus attendant / 4,490 kg (9,899 lb)
- Length: 16.79 m (55 ft 1 in) fuselage

18.7 m (61 ft) rotor turning

- Height: 4.97 m (16 ft 4 in)
- Empty weight: 4,660 kg (10,274 lb)
- Max takeoff weight: 9,150 kg (20,172 lb)
- Powerplant: 2 × Turbomeca Makila 1A2 turboshaft, 1,376 kW (1,845 hp) each
- Main rotor diameter: 16.2 m (53 ft 2 in)
- Main rotor area: 206.12 m^{2} (2,218.7 sq ft)
- Blade section: root: NACA 13112; tip: NACA 13106

Performance

- Cruise speed: 277 km/h (172 mph, 150 kn) max,

247 km/h (153 mph; 133 kn) econ.

- Never exceed speed: 327 km/h (203 mph, 177 kn)
- Range: 851 km (529 mi, 460 nmi)
- Service ceiling: 5,180 m (17,000 ft)
- Rate of climb: 7.4 m/s (1,460 ft/min)

== Family tree ==
  - SA330 Puma – (France)
    - Atlas Oryx – (South Africa)
      - Denel Rooivalk – (South Africa)
    - IAR 330 – (Romania)
    - IPTN NAS 330J (Indonesia)
    - Westland Puma HC.1 (United Kingdom)
  - Eurocopter AS332 Super Puma – (France) (H215 Super Puma)
    - Eurocopter AS532 Cougar – (France) (H215M Caracal)
    - KAI KUH-1 Surion – (South Korea)
  - Eurocopter EC725 – (France) (H225M Caracal)
    - Eurocopter EC225 Super Puma – (France) (EC225 Super Puma Mk2)

== See also ==
Related development

- Aérospatiale Puma
- IAR 330
- Eurocopter AS 532
- Eurocopter EC225
- KAI Surion

Aircraft of comparable role, configuration, and era

- Sikorsky S-92
- Mil Mi-38
- Mil Mi-17

Related lists

- List of rotorcraft
