= Swiss military aircraft serials =

Identification for Swiss military aircraft

In Switzerland, to identify individual aircraft, all military aircraft are allocated and display a serial number.

== History ==
A squadron of aeroplanes standing in a row on the airfield Dübendorf.

=== Pre Air Force Years to 1915 ===
From 1900 to 1915 the Swiss Military had artillery observation balloons. The balloons were usually referred to by a name, for example Vagabond, Bise, Föhn, etc. The numbering of the balloon corps was autonomous and had nothing to do with the numbers of Fliegerabteilung (Air Force). The Balloons had the serials from 1 to 20.

The Swiss Air Force was founded in 1914. The first Aircraft started with the serials 21, 22, 23, .. In 1915 the Balloons get the prefix "K". Some requisitioned Aircraft don't get any serial number.

=== 1915 to 1936 ===
The serial numbers were all without a prefix and reached from 21 to 873.

== 1936 to today ==
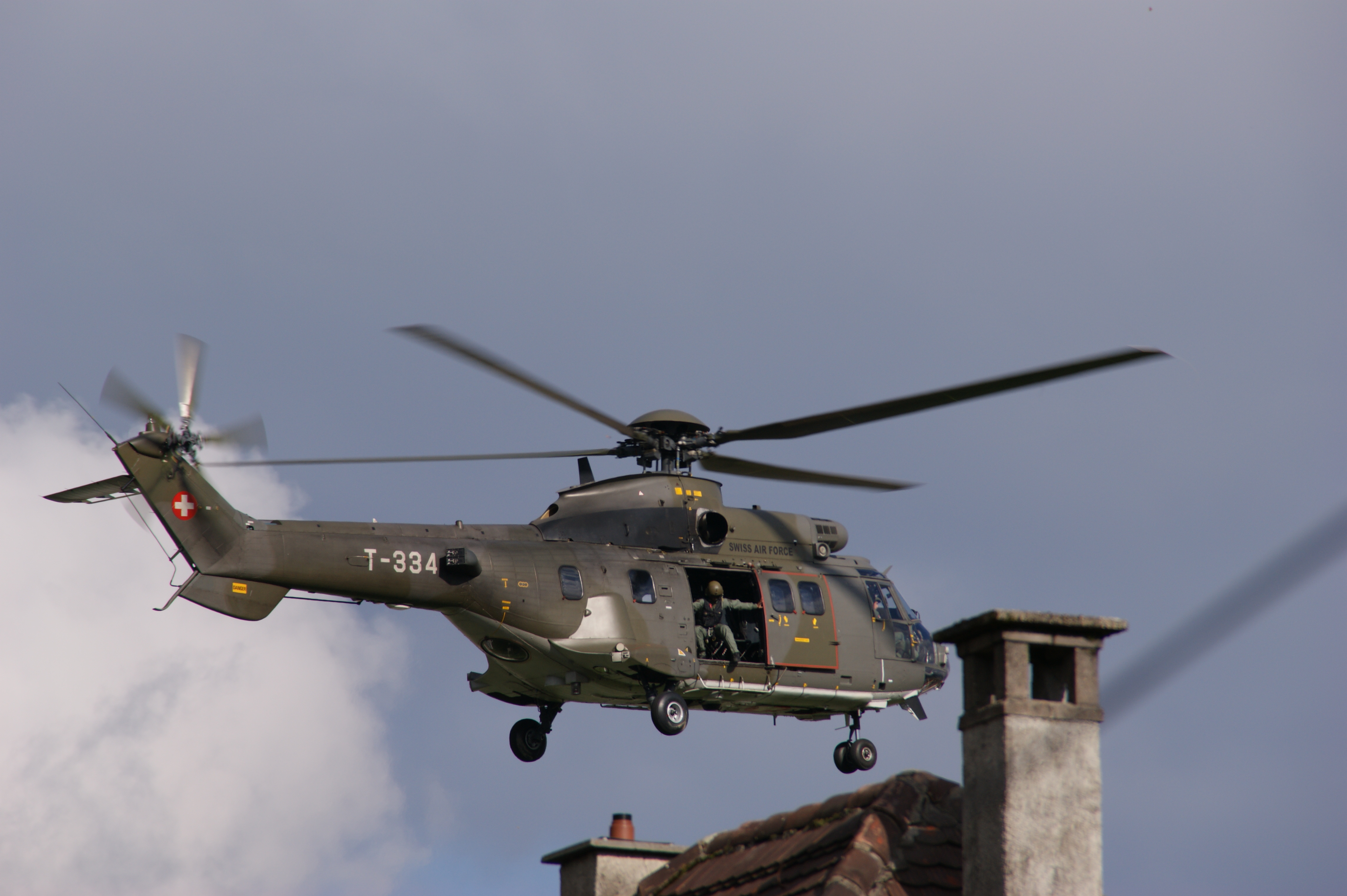
Cougar AS532 T 334 Swiss Air Force Rescue Exercise

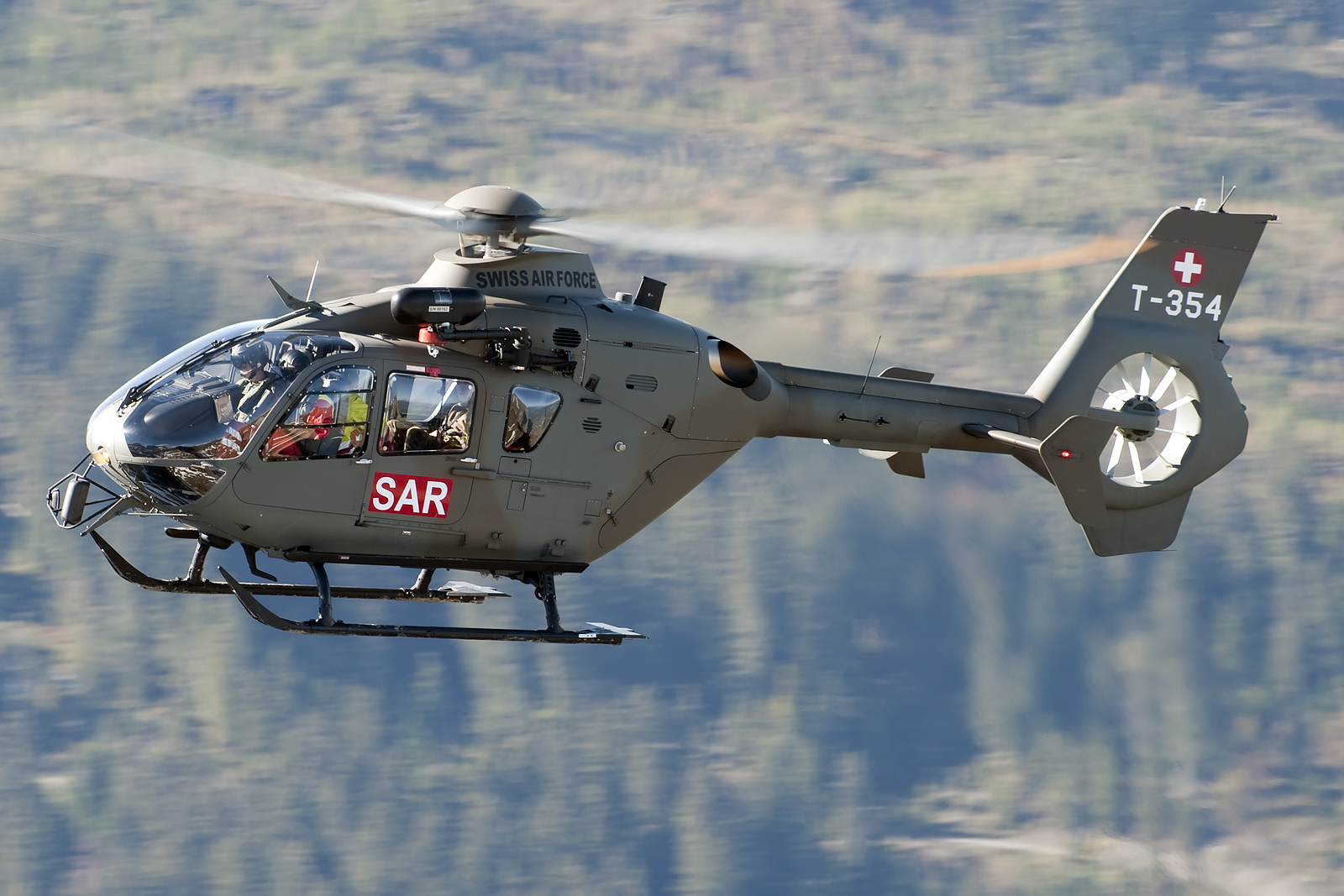
T-354 Swiss Air Force Eurocopter EC635

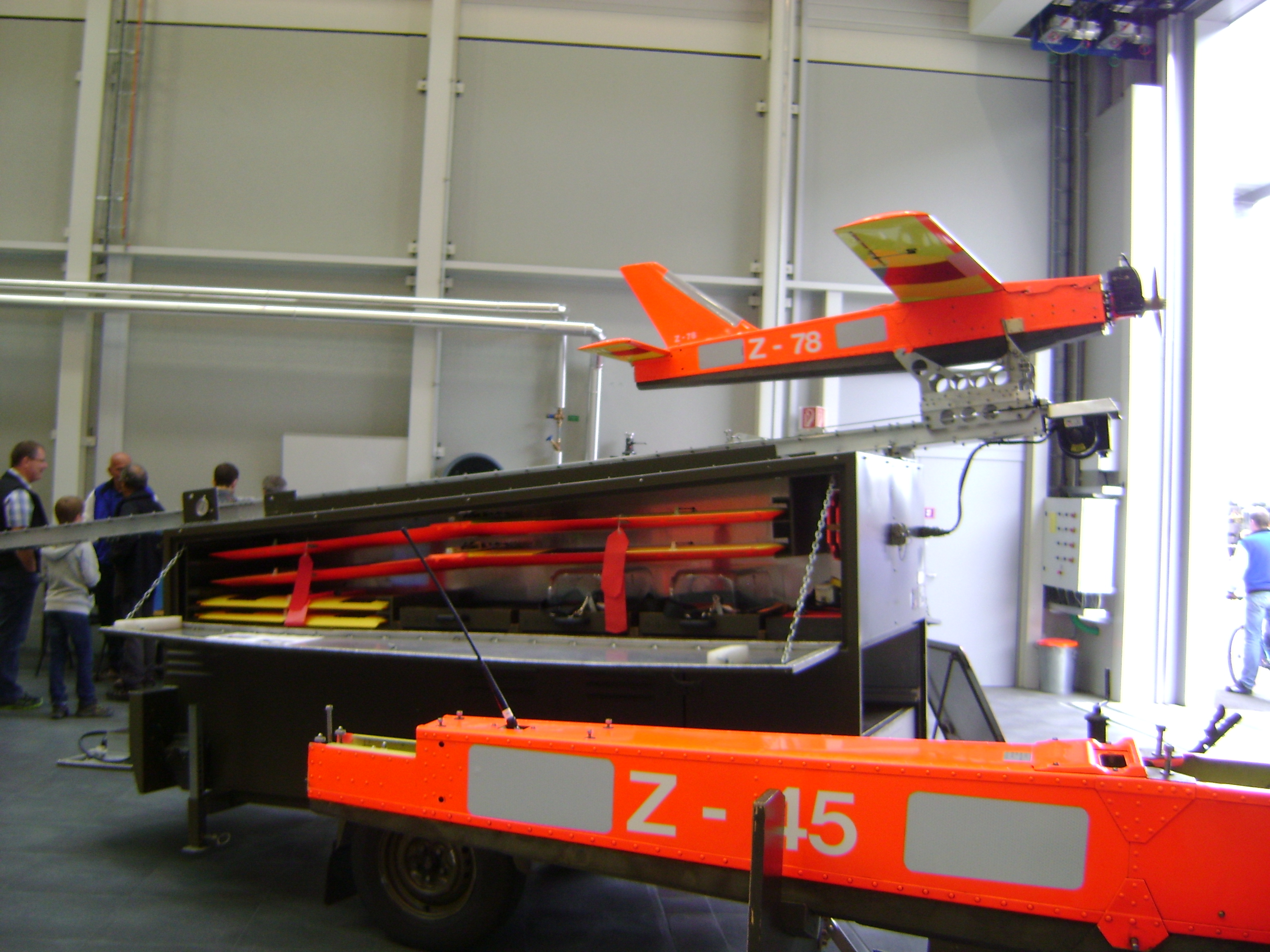
KZD-85 Z-'78 & Z-45

=== Aircraft serial numbering ===
The Swiss Air Force military aircraft are identified by a role prefix and number, the prefix or code identifies the role and the serial numbers the type or variant, the system was introduced in 1936.

Letter code

The letter or letters give the role of the aircraft.

Guide to aircraft role identification
Code letter	Role	Example
A	Ausbildung = Trainer	Pilatus PC-21: A-101
B	Bomber	De Havilland D.H.98 Mosquito: B-5
C	Communication	Pilatus PC-9: C-403
D	Drohne = Drone	ADS-95: D-108
J	Jäger = Fighter	F/A-18C: J-5001
KAB	Kampfbeobachtung = "Battlefield observation"	Hiller UH-12: KAB-101
R	Reconnaissance	Diamond DA42: R-711
T	Transport	Dassault Falcon 900: T-785
U	Umschulung = "Advanced trainer"	BAe Hawk: U-1251
V	Verbindung = Liaison	Pilatus PC-6: V-622
Z	Zieldrohne = Target drone	Farner/RUAG KZD-85: Z-30

This is followed by a number having from two to four digits.

Four-digit numbers

The first digit identifies the aircraft type. The next three are for the sub-type and the individual aircraft, with the first and sometimes second for the subtype; and the third and sometimes fourth for the individual aircraft, In the following examples, "x" identifies the individual aircraft:

- Mirage IIIBS = J-200x
- Mirage IIIDS = J-201x
- Mirage IIIRS = R-21xx
- Mirage IIIC = J-22xx
- Mirage IIIS = J-23xx
- F-5E = J-30xx (serials previously used for the FFA P-16)
- F-5F = J-32xx

Three-digit numbers

Most aircraft have three numbers. These follow a broadly similar pattern to the four-digit numbers, although there are exceptions.

Transport aircraft have a first digit of 3 for helicopters and 7 for fixed wing aircraft.

Two-digit numbers

Target drones have only two numbers.

== Using of civil serial by Military Aviation ==
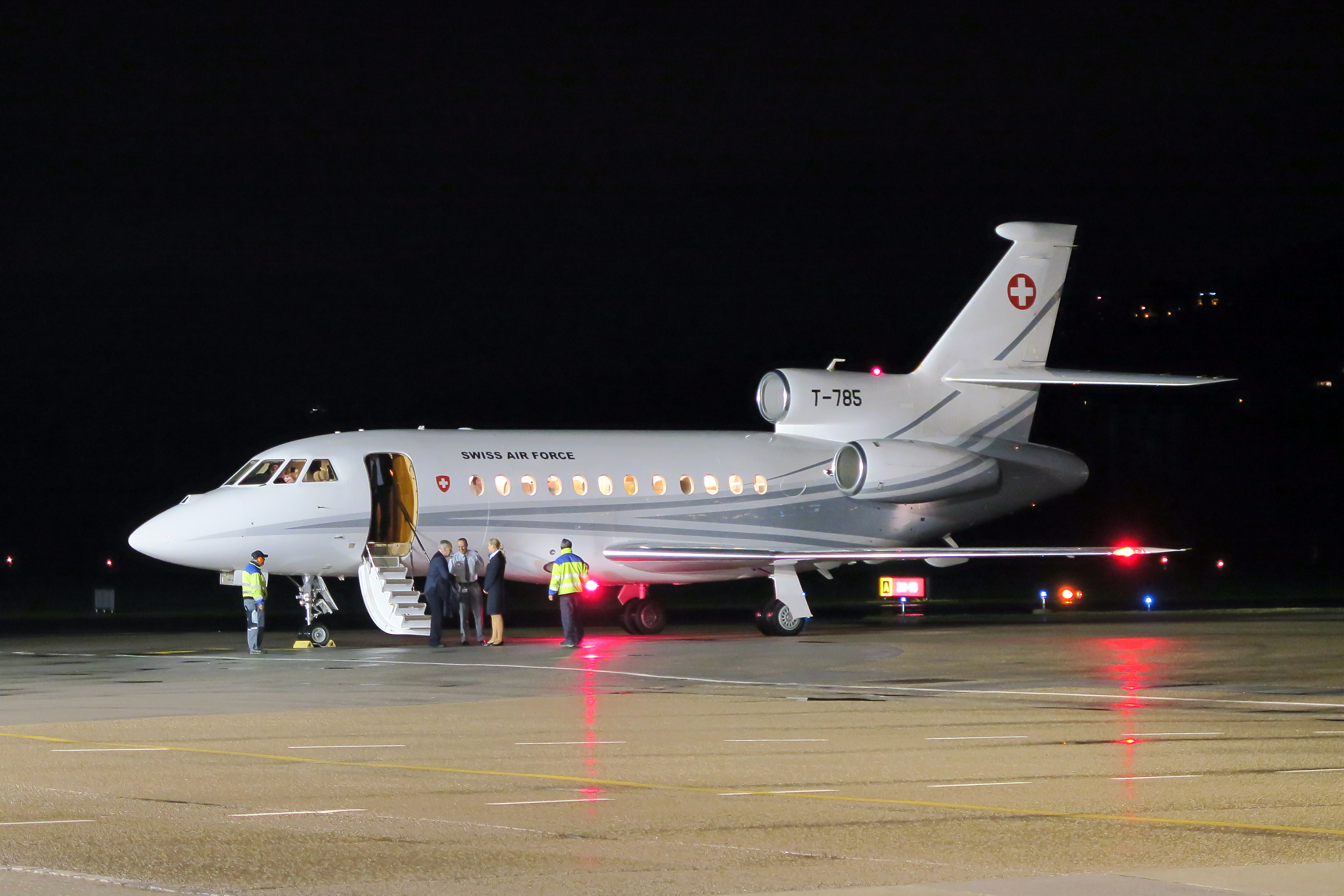
T-785 VIP aircraft

Until 2005 it was possible that the Swiss Air Force used for its VIP aircraft a military aircraft serial T-XXX or a civil serial HB-XXX. Since 2005 all Swiss Air Force VIP aircraft have only military aircraft serials. For e.g. Cessna 560XL former HB-VAA now T-784.

=== Armasuisse ===
Armasuisse belongs, like the Air Force, to the Defense Department. Armasuisse operates three aircraft, two of which have civil aircraft serials (Pilatus PC-6 HB-FCF and Pilatus PC-12 HB-FOG) and one which has a military aircraft serial (Diamond DA42 R-711).

== See also ==
- List of aircraft of the Swiss Air Force
- United Kingdom military aircraft serials
- Portuguese military aircraft serials
- Belgian aircraft registration and serials
