= List of aircraft of the Swiss Air Force =

Since its formation, the Swiss Air Force has used a number of different aircraft.

== Detailed list of current inventory ==
=== Fixed-wing aircraft ===
Model	Variant	Image	Origin	Type	Quantity acquired	In service since	Quantity in 2025	Notes
Combat aircraft
F/A-18 Hornet	F/A-18C		United States Switzerland	Multirole combat aircraft	26	1997	25	Acquired with the Armament Programme 1992. 26 ordered, 1 aircraft assembled in the US, 25 in Switzerland. 1 lost in a crash in 2016.
F-5 Tiger	F-5E Tiger II		United States Switzerland	Light fighter	98	1978	15	Acquisitions: 66 ordered in 1975; 32 ordered in 1981; A part of the fleet was made under licence in Switzerland. Among the 18 operational, 6 are in use with the Patrouille Suisse as of 2025. 60 Sold to the USA: 44 in 2008 to the US Navy; 16 sold in 2020, first delivery in 2024 (E variant); 11 were lost in crashes.
Transport aircraft
Pilatus PC-6 Porter	PC-6M		Switzerland	STOL, single-engine, turboprop, transport aircraft	18	1967	14	12 manufactured in 1966; 6 manufactured in 1975
Bombardier Challenger 600 series	Challenger 604		Canada	VIP transport aircraft, or MEDEVAC	2	2019	2	Aircraft operated by the Federal Air Transport Service. The aircraft were purchased second hand from the REGA.
VIP transport aircraft
Dassault Falcon 900	900EX		France	VIP transport aircraft	1	2013	1	Aircraft operated by the Federal Air Transport Service.
Bombardier Global Express	Global 7500		Canada	VIP transport aircraft	1	2024	1	Aircraft operated by the Federal Air Transport Service. Successor of the Cessna Citation Excel 560XL, ordered in August 2023.
Trainer aircraft
Pilatus PC-7	PC-7 WE		Switzerland	Basic trainer	40	1982	27	40 purchased and entered service in the 1980s. 9 aircraft used by the PC-7 Team since 1989. Modernisations: 28 to the NCPC-7 standard in 2011; 27 being modernised as of 2024 by RUAG to the standard PC-7 WE
Pilatus PC-21	—		Switzerland	Advanced training aircraft, and Lead-in fighter trainer	8	2008	7	Orders: 6 with the Armament programme 2006; 2 with the Armament Programme 2010; Mid-life update contract in 2020 and done by 2024. The A-105 was damaged in 2023.
F-5 Tiger	F-5F Tiger II		United States Switzerland	Conversion training aircraft	12	1978	4	Acquisitions: 6 ordered in 1975; 6 ordered in 1981; A part of the fleet was made under licence in Switzerland. Resale: 6 sold in 2020 (F variant)
F/A-18 Hornet	F/A-18D		United States Switzerland	Conversion training aircraft	8	1997	5	Acquired with the Armament Programme 1992. 8 ordered, 1 aircraft assembled in the US, 7 in Switzerland. 3 lost in crashes: 1 in March 1998; 1 in October 2013; 1 in October 2015
Special role aircraft
Beechcraft Super King Air	Model 350C Super King Air		United States	Cartography / mapping aircraft (transport aircraft as secondary role)	1	1993	1	Operated by the air force, for Swisstopo.
De Havilland Canada DHC-6 Twin Otter	DHC-6-300		Canada	Cartography / mapping aircraft (transport aircraft as secondary role)	1	1976	1	Operated by the air force, for Swisstopo. New sensor since 2017, the ADS100.
Armasuisse test aircraft
Diamond DA42	DA42 Centaur OPA		Germany United States	Test aircraft	1	2012	1	Aircraft operated by Armasuisse. Optionally piloted aircraft developed by Aurora Flight Sciences (US company), usable as ISR aircraft. Used for flight trials in profit of the ADS 15 UAV.
Pilatus PC-6 Porter	—		Switzerland	Test aircraft (transport aircraft as secondary role)	1	1967	1	Aircraft operated by Armasuisse. Used for transmission trials, for flight data registration.
Pilatus PC-12	PC-12M		Switzerland	Test aircraft (transport aircraft as secondary role)	1	2001	1	Aircraft operated by Armasuisse. Test aircraft for the FLORAKO system.

=== Rotary-wing aircraft ===
Model	Variant	Image	Origin	Type	Quantity acquired	In service since	Quantity in 2025	Notes
Eurocopter AS332 Super Puma Swiss designation: TH 89/06	AS 332M1		France	Transport / utility helicopter	15	1987	13	Acquisitions: 3 in 1986; 12 with the Armament Programme 1989; MLU by RUAG with the Armament Programme 2006, entered service between 2012 and 2014.
Eurocopter AS332 Super Puma Swiss designation: TH 89/06	AS 332M1 Super Puma FLIR Forward looking infrared	T-311 with FLIR T-314 with FLIR T-321 with FLIR T-323 with FLIR	France	SAR helicopter Search and rescue	0	2013	1	MLU by RUAG with the Armament Programme 2006, entered service in 2013.
Eurocopter AS532 Cougar Swiss designation: TH 98/18	AS532UL Cougar Mk1		France Switzerland	Transport / utility helicopter	12	2002	8	Ordered with the Armament Programme 1998. 2 made by Eurocopter, 10 assembled by RUAG. Losses: 1 in 2011; 1 in 2016; MLU by RUAG with the Armament Programme 2018, all 9 delivered by 2022.
Eurocopter AS532 Cougar Swiss designation: TH 98/18	AS532UL Cougar Mk1		France Switzerland	VIP Transport helicopter	12	2002	1	Ordered with the Armament Programme 1998. 2 made by Eurocopter, 10 assembled by RUAG. Losses: 1 in 2011; 1 in 2016; MLU by RUAG with the Armament Programme 2018, all 9 delivered by 2022.
Eurocopter EC635 Swiss designation: TH 05	EC635 P2+		Germany Switzerland	Transport / utility / trainer / SAR	20	2008	17	Purchased with the Armamament Programme 2005. 2 of the 18 made in Germany, 16 assembled by RUAG. A helicopter was lost in 2024.
Eurocopter EC635 Swiss designation: TH 05	EC635 P2+		Germany	VIP Transport helicopter	20	2008	2	Purchased with the Armamament Programme 2005. It is operated by the Federal Air Transport Service. (Registration T-351 / T-352)

== Future aircraft ==
Model	Variant	Image	Origin	Type	Quantity acquired	In service since	Quantity in 2025	Notes
Combat aircraft
Lockheed Martin F-35 Lightning II	F-35A Block 4 (TR-3 - technological refresh 3)		United States Italy Switzerland	Command vehicle	36	2027 (with the batch 18)	0	Selected in June 2021 as part of the Air 2030 Programme. The contract was signed in September 2022. Planned production: 4 to 8 by LM in the USA; 24 to 28 by Leonardo in Italy; 4 by RUAG in Switzerland; The order is part of batch 18.
UAV (unmanned aerial vehicles)
Elbit Hermes 900	ADS 15		Israel Switzerland	Fixed-wing UAV, ISR Unmanned aerial vehicle, intelligence, surveillance and reconnaissance	6	2026	3	Successor of the ADS 95. Order to Elbit and RUAG as part of the Armament Programme 2015. First two delivered in 2023 for trial. Order of the last four confirmed in September 2025.

== Planned investments ==
Programme	Models	Image	Origin	Type	Quantity planned	In service since	Notes
Replacement of the AS532 Cougar and the AS332 Super Puma	AW139		Italy Switzerland	Medium transport helicopter	—	2028–2035	To be ordered with an Armament Program from 2028 to 2035.
Replacement of the AS532 Cougar and the AS332 Super Puma	AW149		Italy	Medium transport helicopter	—	2028–2035	To be ordered with an Armament Program from 2028 to 2035.
Replacement of the AS532 Cougar and the AS332 Super Puma	H175		France Germany	Medium transport helicopter	—	2028–2035	To be ordered with an Armament Program from 2028 to 2035.
Replacement of the AS532 Cougar and the AS332 Super Puma	H225M		France	Medium transport helicopter	—	2028–2035	To be ordered with an Armament Program from 2028 to 2035.
Replacement of the AS532 Cougar and the AS332 Super Puma	NH90		France Germany Italy Netherlands	Medium transport helicopter	—	2028–2035	To be ordered with an Armament Program from 2028 to 2035.

== Retired aircraft ==
=== Fixed-wing aircraft ===
Model	Variant	Origin	Type	Role	Entered service in (year)	Retired in (year)	Quantity	Notes
Combat aircraft
Dassault Mirage III	IIIS	France Switzerland (licence)	Second generation jet fighter	Lightweight interceptor	1964	1999	36	
Hawker Hunter	Mk 58	United Kingdom	First generation jet fighter	Fighter	1963	1994	100	
Hawker Hunter	Mk 58A	United Kingdom	First generation jet fighter	Fighter-bomber	1972	1994	52	Second-hand purchased from the UK.: 30; 22
de Havilland Venom	D.H.112 Mk 1	United Kingdom Switzerland (licence)	First generation jet fighter	Fighter-bomber / night fighter	1953	1984	126	
de Havilland Venom	D.H.112 Mk 4	United Kingdom Switzerland (licence)	First generation jet fighter	Fighter-bomber / night fighter	1956	1984	100	
P-51 Mustang	P-51D	United States	Fighter aircraft	Interceptor / fighter-bomber	1948	1957	113	
de Havilland Vampire	D.H.110 Vampire Mk. 6	United Kingdom	First generation jet fighter	Fighter / fighter-bomber / night fighter	1949	1990	75	Orders: 75 in 1948
de Havilland Vampire	D.H.110 Vampire Mk. 6	United Kingdom Switzerland (licence)	First generation jet fighter	Fighter / fighter-bomber / night fighter	1951	1990	100	100 ordered in 1950, 3 assembled from spare parts in 1960
Messerschmitt Bf 109	Bf 109 D-1	Germany	Low-wing monoplane	Fighter (training as secondary role)	1939	1949	10	
Messerschmitt Bf 109	Bf 109 E-1 / E-3a	Germany	Low-wing monoplane	Fighter	1939	1948	80	Orders: 30 E-1 in 1939; 50 E-1 and E-3a
Messerschmitt Bf 109	Bf 109 E-3a	Germany Switzerland (licence)	Low-wing monoplane	Fighter	1944	1948	9	1 made from spare parts, 8 made under licence in Switzerland
Messerschmitt Bf 109	Bf 109 G-6	Germany	Low-wing monoplane	Fighter	1944	1948	14	12 in 1944, 1 in 1945, 1 in 1946
Morane-Saulnier M.S.406	MS.406H	France Switzerland (licence)	Low-wing monoplane	Fighter	1939	1956	322	
Potez 25		France	Biplane	Light bomber	1938	1944	2	
Dewoitine D.27	D.27 lll-R	Switzerland	Monoplane fighter	Interceptor	1932	1944	15	
Dewoitine D.27	D.27 lll	France Switzerland (licence)	Monoplane fighter	Interceptor	1931	1944	65	
Hanriot HD.1	—	France	Biplane	Fighter and combat trainer	1921	1930	16	Bought second-hand from Italy
Nieuport 28	C-1 Baby	France	Biplane	Fighter and combat trainer	1918	1930	15	
Reconnaissance
Dassault Mirage III	IIIRS	France Switzerland (licence)	Second generation jet fighter	Aerial reconnaissance	1968	2003	18	
Beechcraft Twin Bonanza	E 50	United States	Twin-engine, low-wing monoplane	Liaison aircraft	1957	1989	3	
de Havilland Venom	D.H.112 Mk 1R	United Kingdom Switzerland (licence)	First generation jet fighter	Aerial reconnaissance	1956	1984	24	
P-51D Mustang	F-6D and F-6K	United States	Fighter aircraft	Aerial reconnaissance	1948	1957	15	
Piper Super Cub		United States	observation		1948	1975	6	
EKW C-36		Switzerland	reconnaissance		1942	1987	160	
Fieseler Fi 156		Germany	observation		1940	1963	5	
Messerschmitt Bf 108		Germany	communications		1938	1959	18	
EKW C-35		Switzerland	reconnaissance		1937	1954	160	
Fokker C.V		Netherlands	reconnaissance		1927	1954	64	
Potez 25		France	Biplane	Observation / reconnaissance	1927	1940	17	
Häfeli DH-5		Switzerland	reconnaissance		1922	1940	80	
Häfeli DH-3		Switzerland	reconnaissance		1917	1939	109	
Häfeli DH-1		Switzerland	reconnaissance		1916	1919	6	
Dornier Do 27		Germany	communications			2005	3	
Military transport
Junkers Ju 52	Ju 52/3m g4e	Germany	Transport aircraft	Military transport	1939	1981	3	
Beechcraft Model 18	C18S	United States	Transport	Military transport	1952	1967	1	
Beechcraft Model 18	C-45F Expeditor	United States	Transport	Military transport	1948	1969	2	
Siebel Si 204	—	Germany	Transport	Military transport	1945	1955	1	
Messerschmitt M 18	M 18C	Germany	Transport	Military transport	1929	1954	2	
Messerschmitt M 18	M 18D	Germany	Transport	Military transport	1935	1954	1	
VIP Transport
Pilatus PC-24	—	Switzerland	Business jet	VIP	2019	2022	1	Purchased new, sold to JoyVida International.
Cessna Citation Excel	560XL	United States	Business jet	VIP	2013	2025	1	
Dassault Falcon 900	900EX	France	Business jet	VIP	2013	2025	1	Second-hand from Monaco.
Beechcraft 1900	1900D	United States	Business jet	VIP	2007	2020	1	Replaced by two CL604.
Dassault Falcon 50	—	France	Business jet	VIP	1996	2013	1	Second-hand. Replaced by the Falcon 900EX.
Learjet 35	Learjet 35A	United States	Business jet	VIP	1988	2006	2	
Trainer aircraft
BAE Hawk	Hawk 66	United Kingdom Switzerland (assembly)	Jet aircraft	Advanced training	1990	2002	20	Ordered in 1987. 18 sold to Finland in 2007.
Dassault Mirage III	IIIDS	France	Second generation jet fighter	Conversion trainer	1983	2003	2	Replacing 2 IIIBS lost by Switzerland.
Hawker Hunter	Mk 68	United Kingdom Switzerland (licence)	Jet aircraft	Conversion trainer	1976	1994	8	Based on Mk58A purchased second-hand from the UK. Transformed by Eidgenössisches Flugzeugwerk to twin-seat trainer.
Dassault Mirage III	IIIBS	France Switzerland (licence)	Second generation jet fighter	Conversion trainer (interceptor)	1964	2003	4	The 2 were lost in training
de Havilland Vampire	D.H.115 Mk 11	United Kingdom	Jet aircraft	Conversion trainer	1953	1990	3	
de Havilland Vampire	D.H.115 Mk 55	United Kingdom	Jet aircraft	Conversion trainer	1956	1990	36	Orders: 7 in 1955; 20 in 1957; 9 in 1958
Pilatus P-3	P-3/03	Switzerland	Low-wing monoplane	Basic trainer	1957	1992	12	
Pilatus P-3	P-3/05	Switzerland	Low-wing monoplane	Basic trainer	1959	1992	60	
P-51D Mustang	TP-51D	United States	Fighter aircraft	Conversion trainer	1948	1957	2	
Pilatus P-2	P-2/06	Switzerland	Low-wing monoplane	Advanced training	1949	1981	26	26 made between 1948 and 1950
Pilatus P-2	P-2/05	Switzerland	Low-wing monoplane	Advanced training	1947	1981	26	26 made between 1946 and 1948
North American T-6 Texan	AT-16 Harvard IIB	Canada	Low-wing monoplane	IFR training aircraft	1948	1968	40	
Nardi FN.315	—	Italy	Low-wing monoplane	Combat trainer	1944	1948	2	First crashed immediately.
Bücker Bü 133		Germany	Biplane	Combat trainer	1937	1968	52	
Bücker Bü 131		Germany	Biplane	Combat trainer	1936	1971	94	
Dewoitine D.26		France Switzerland (licence)	High-wing monoplane	Combat trainer	1931	1948	11	
Morane-Saulnier MS.229	ET2	France	High-wing monoplane	Combat trainer	1931	1941	2	
Nieuport 28		France	Biplane	Combat trainer	1917	1921	5	
Special role aircraft
Pilatus PC-9	PC-9/F	Switzerland	Low-wing turpoprop	Target tug trainer	1988	2022	12	4 remained in service until 2010
Dassault Mirage III	Mirage IIIC	France	Second generation jet fighter	Evaluation aircraft / test aircraft	1962	1978	1	Used for evaluation, then for testing by F+W Emmen
de Havilland Vampire	D.H.113 NF Mk 10	United Kingdom	First generation jet fighter	Test aircraft / night fighter	1958	1961	1	Radar fighter testing
de Havilland Vampire	D.H.100 Mk 1	United Kingdom	First generation jet fighter	Test aircraft / target tug trainer	1946	1961	4	
Focke-Wulf Fw 44	Fw-44F Stieglitz	Germany	Biplane	Test aircraft / glider towing	1945	1953	1	
de Havilland Mosquito		United Kingdom	Low-wing, twin-engine aircraft multi-role fighter	Test aircraft	1944	1954	2	
Dewoitine D.27	—	France	Monoplane fighter	Test aircraft / development	1928	1936	1	
UAVs
RUAG Ranger ADS-95	—	Switzerland	Fixed wing drone	ISR	2001	2019	28	
F+W ADS-90	—	Switzerland	Fixed wing drone	Surveillance	1990	1998	6	
Farner KZD-85	—	Switzerland	Fixed wing drone	Target drone	1985	2022	70	
Beechcraft MQM-61 Cardinal	KDB-1	United States	Fixed wing drone	Target drone	1962	1965	10	

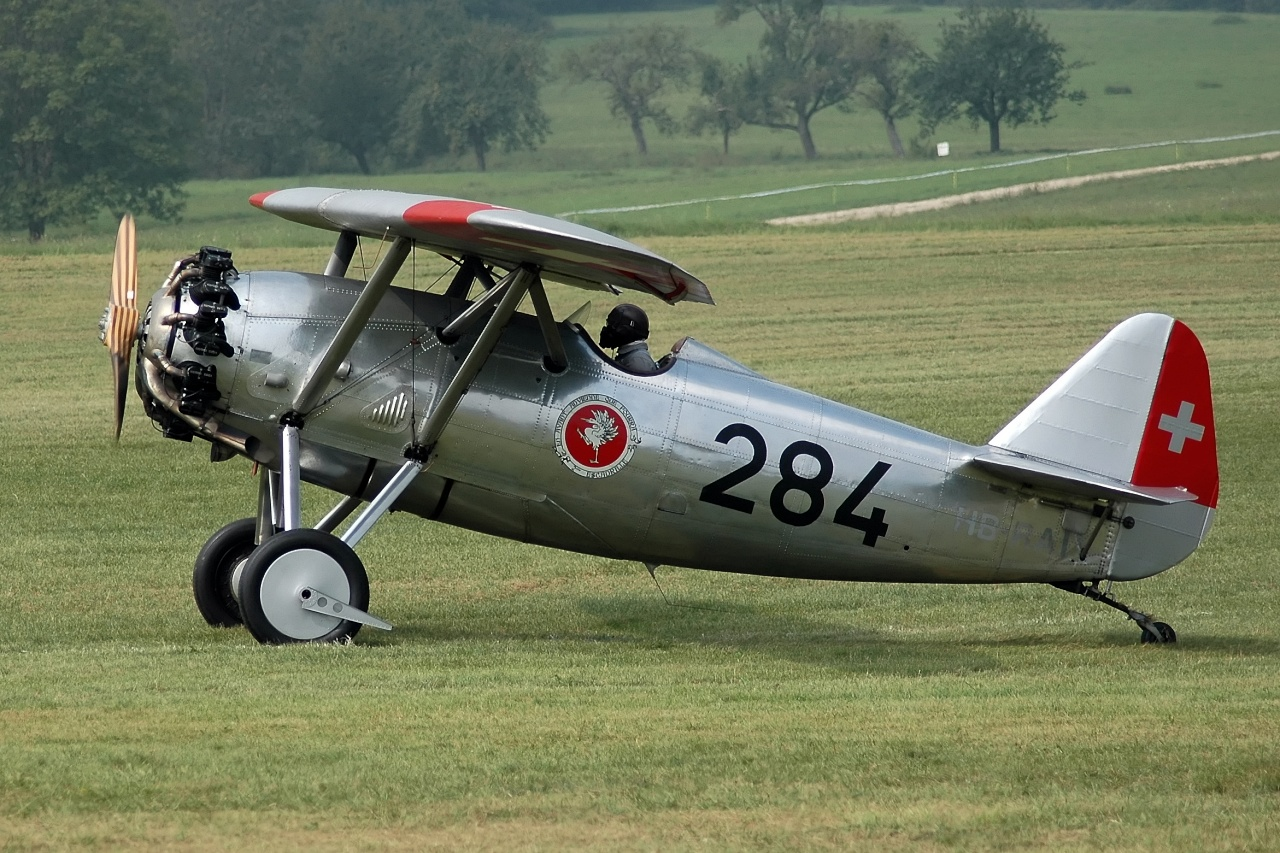
Dewoitine D.27 (restored)

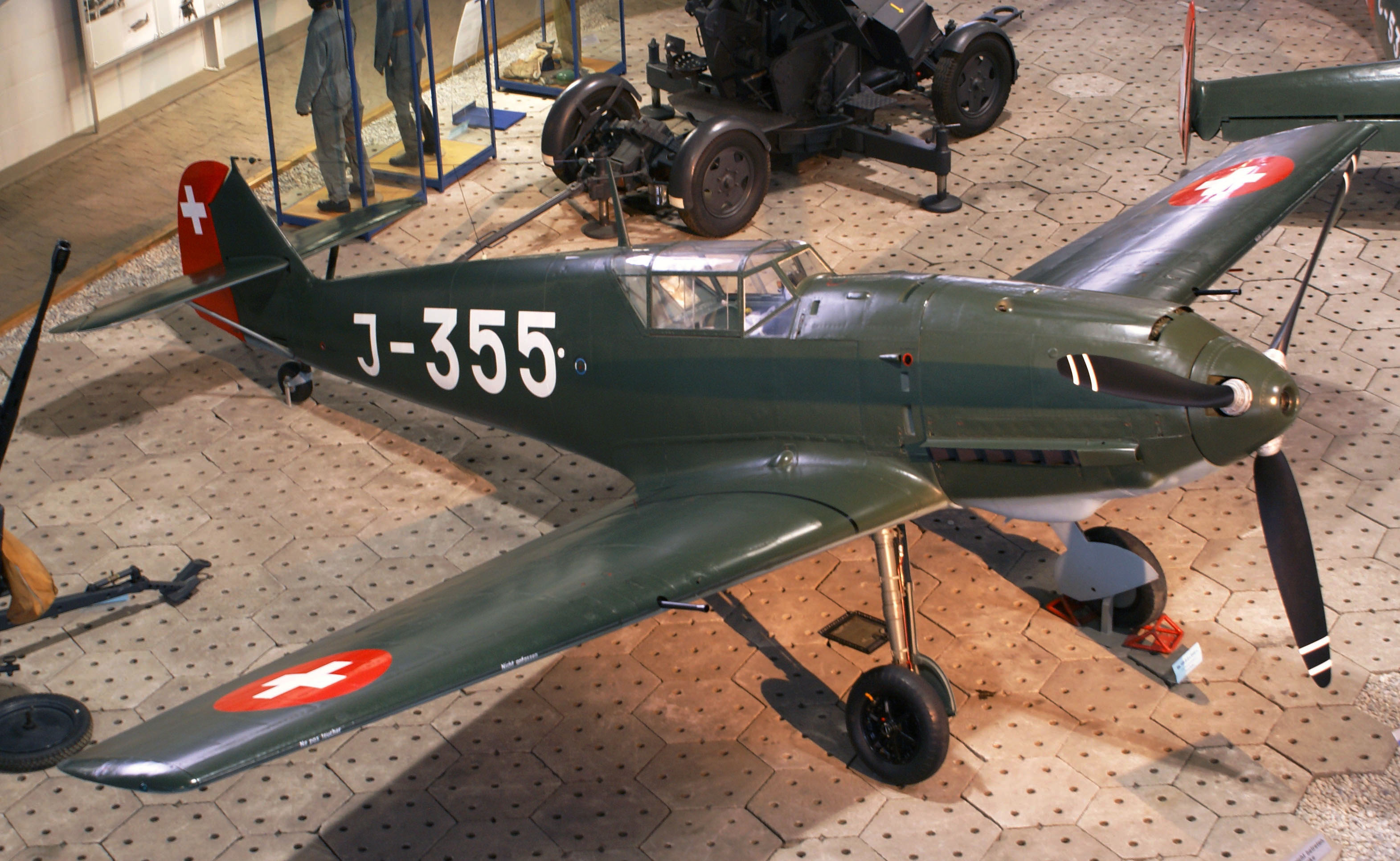
Messerschmitt 109

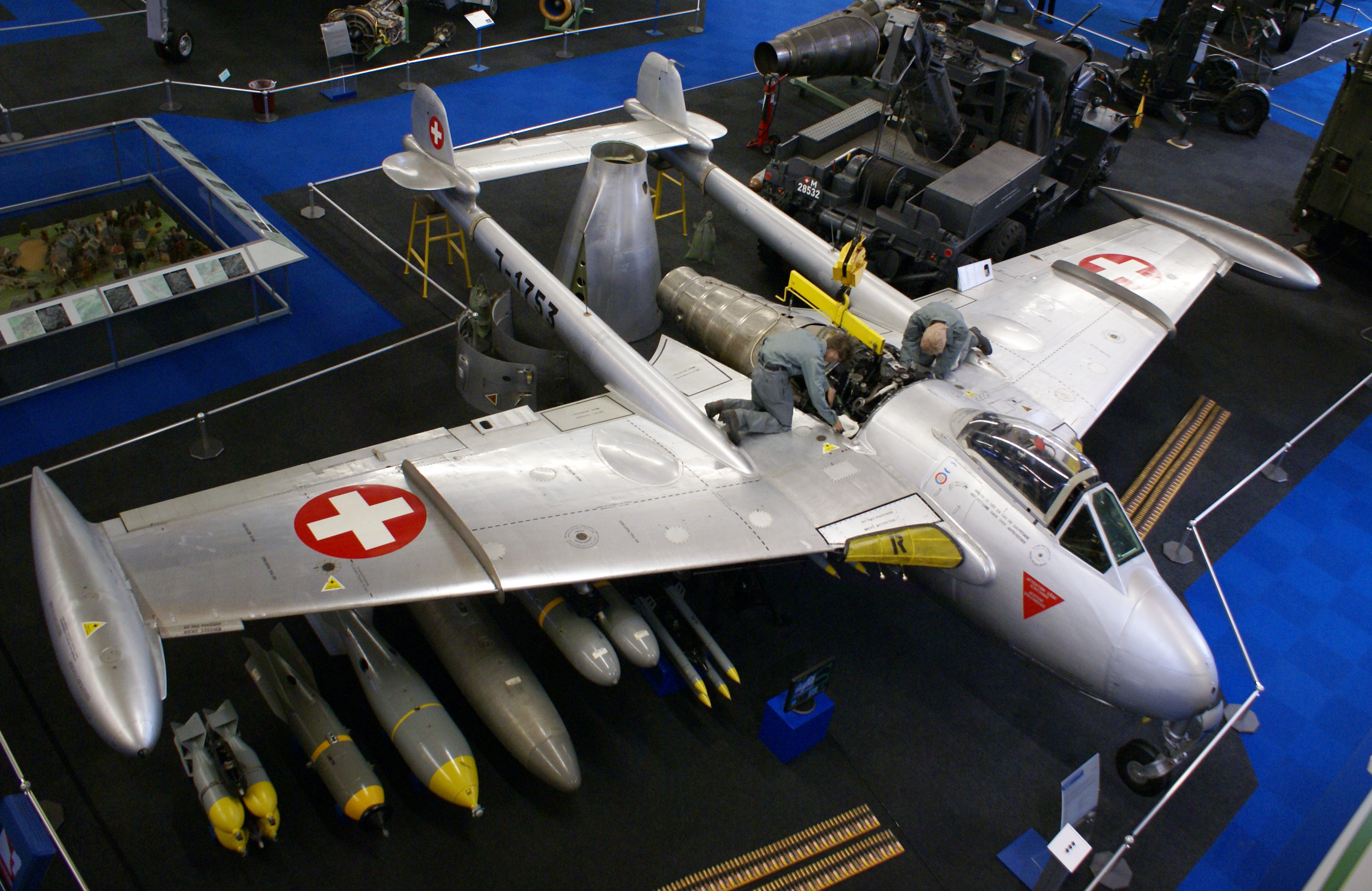
de Havilland Venom fighter

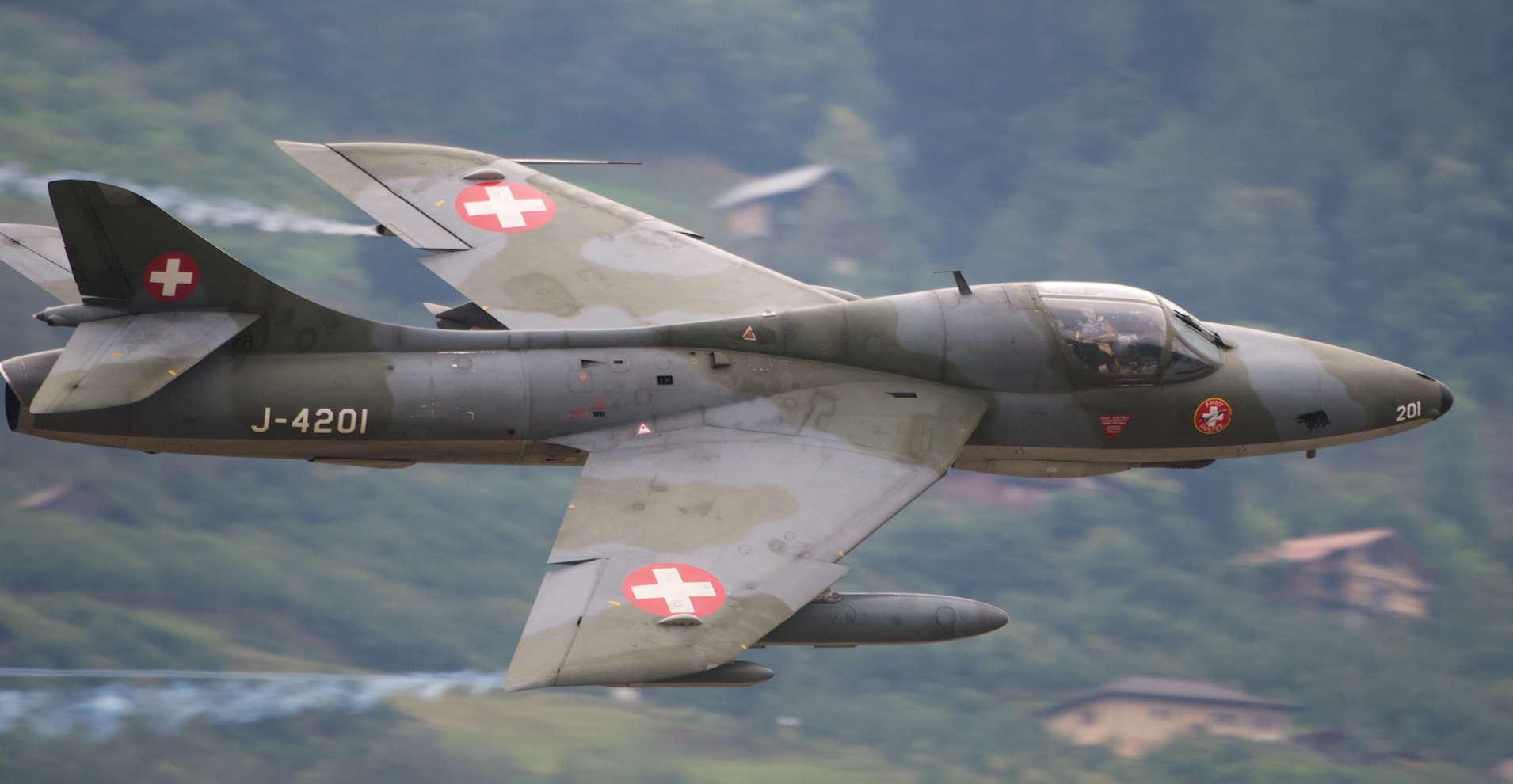
Hawker Hunter fighter

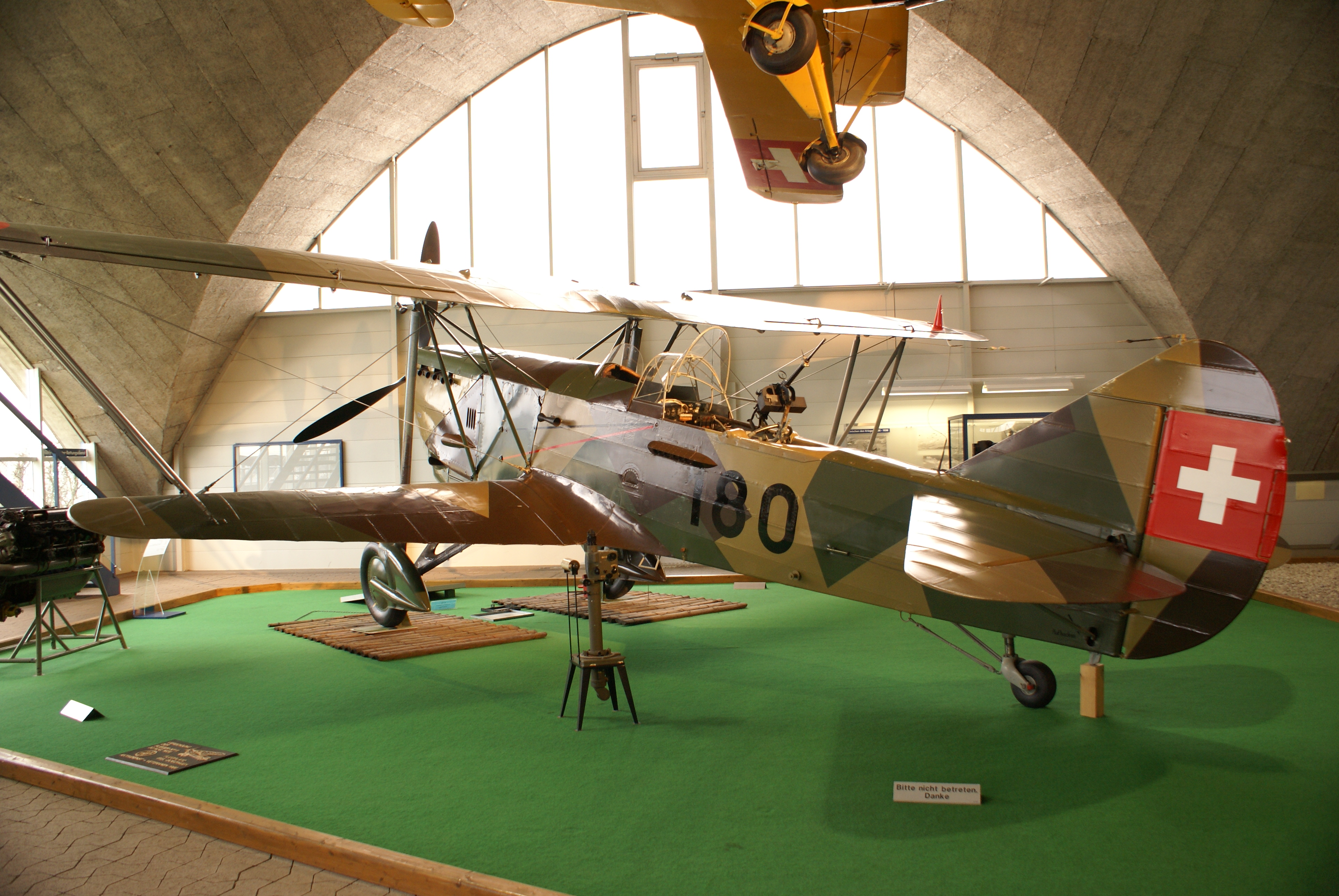
EKW C-35 multipurpose biplane

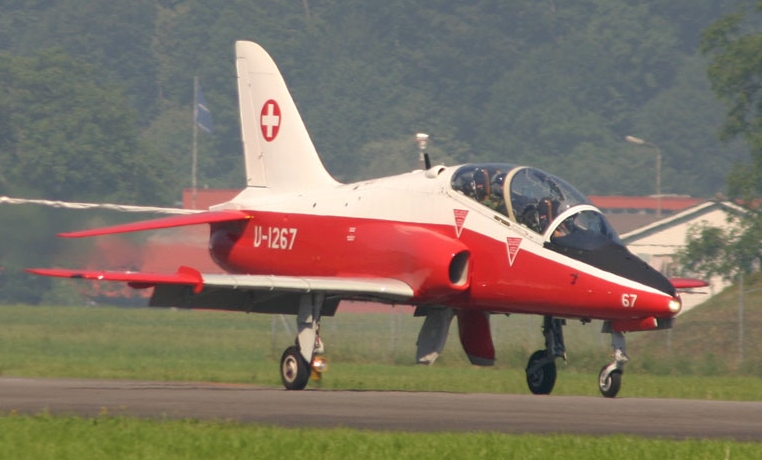
BAE Hawk trainer

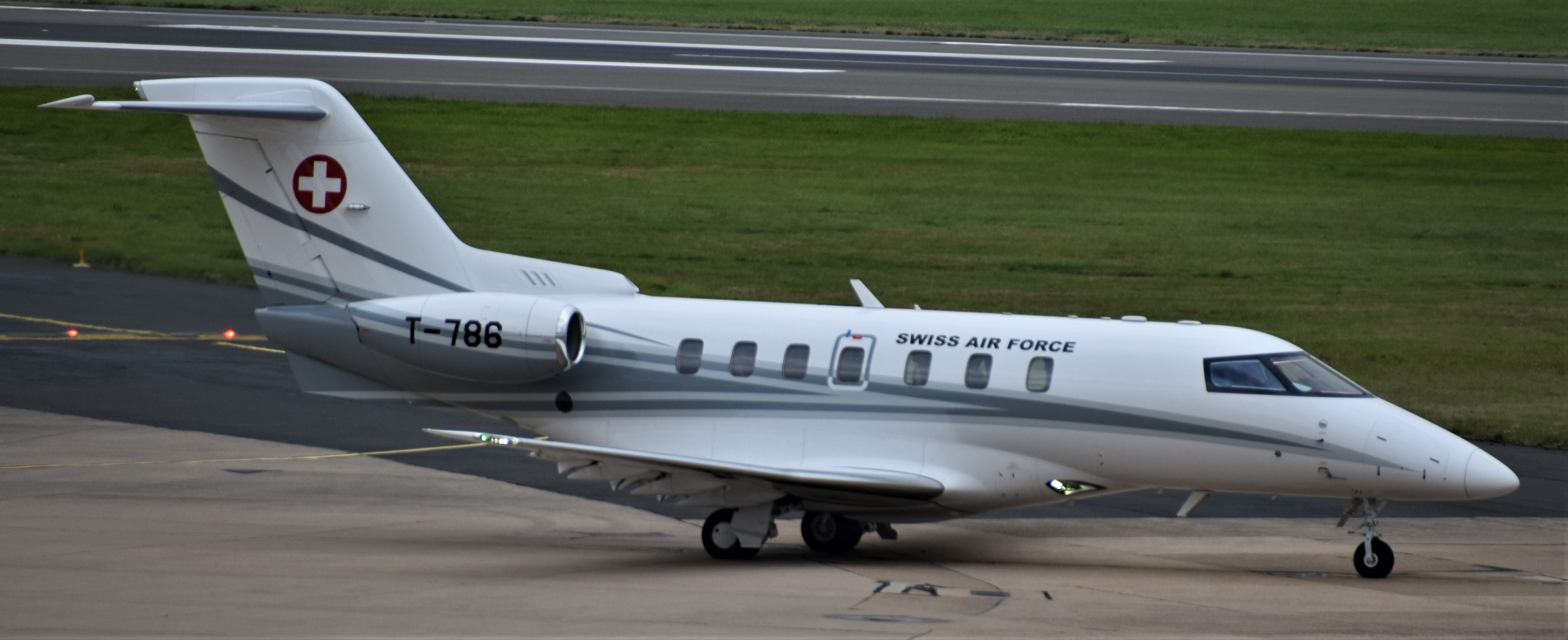
Pilatus PC-24

=== Rotary-wing aircraft ===
Model	Variant	Origin	Type	Role	Entered service in (year)	Retired in (year)	Quantity	Notes
Helicopters
Hiller UH-12	UH-12B	United States	Helicopter	Observation	1952	1962	3	
Sud-Ouest Djinn	—	France	Helicopter	Light utility	1958	1964	4	
Aérospatiale Alouette II	—	France	Helicopter	Utility / SAR	1959	2012	30	10 purchased in 1958; 20 purchased in 1964
Aérospatiale Alouette III	—	France Switzerland	Helicopter	Utility / liaison	1964	2010	84	Replaced by the Eurocopter EC635.: 9 ordered in 1964, made by Sud Aviation; 15 purchased in 1966; 60 ordered in 1972, made under licence by Flugzeugwerke Emmen; 14 lost in accidents.
AS365 Dauphin	SA 365 N1	France	Helicopter	VIP	1984	2009	1	Aircraft purchased to the standard SA365 N.

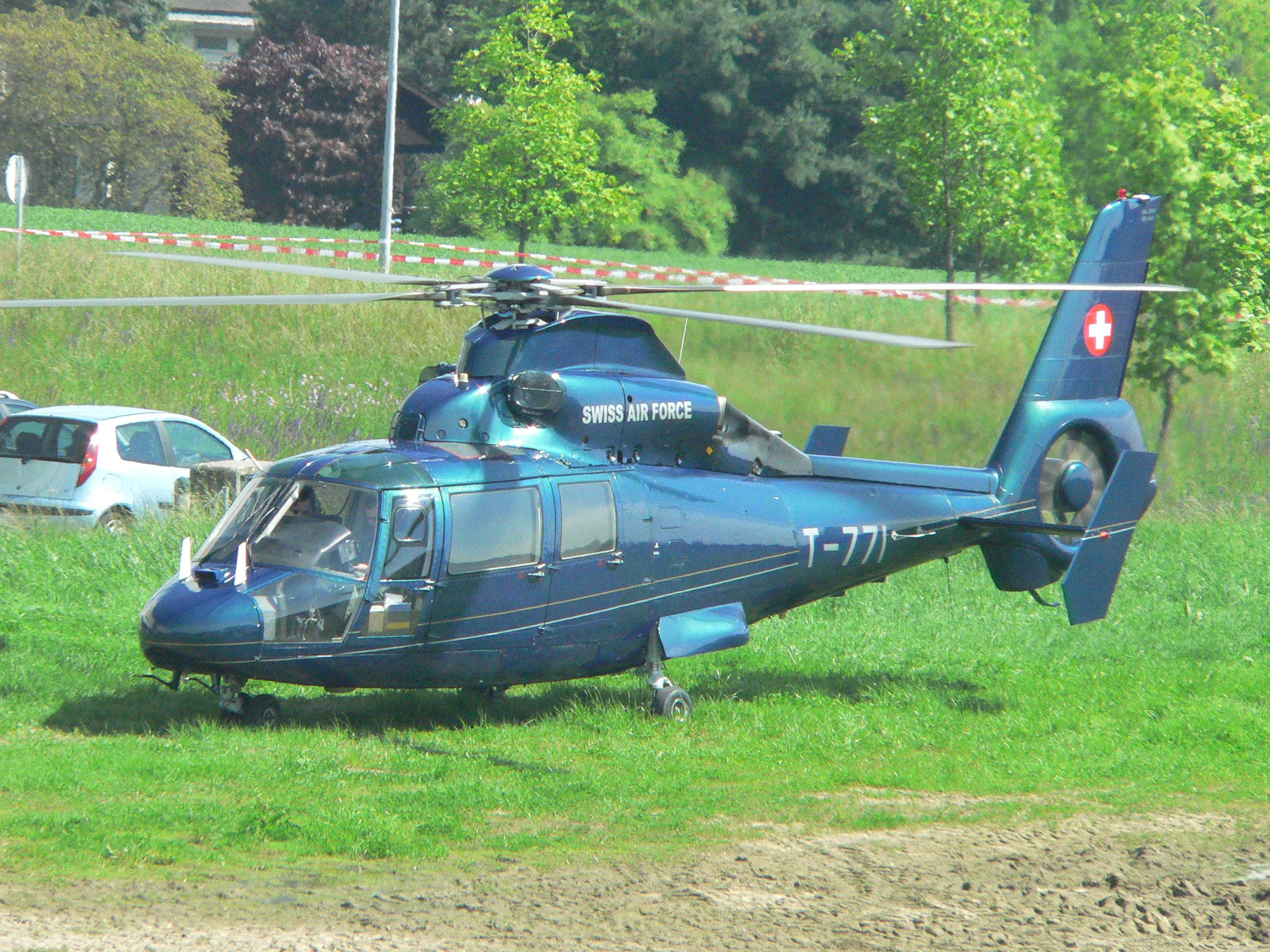
AS365 Dauphin in VIP configuration

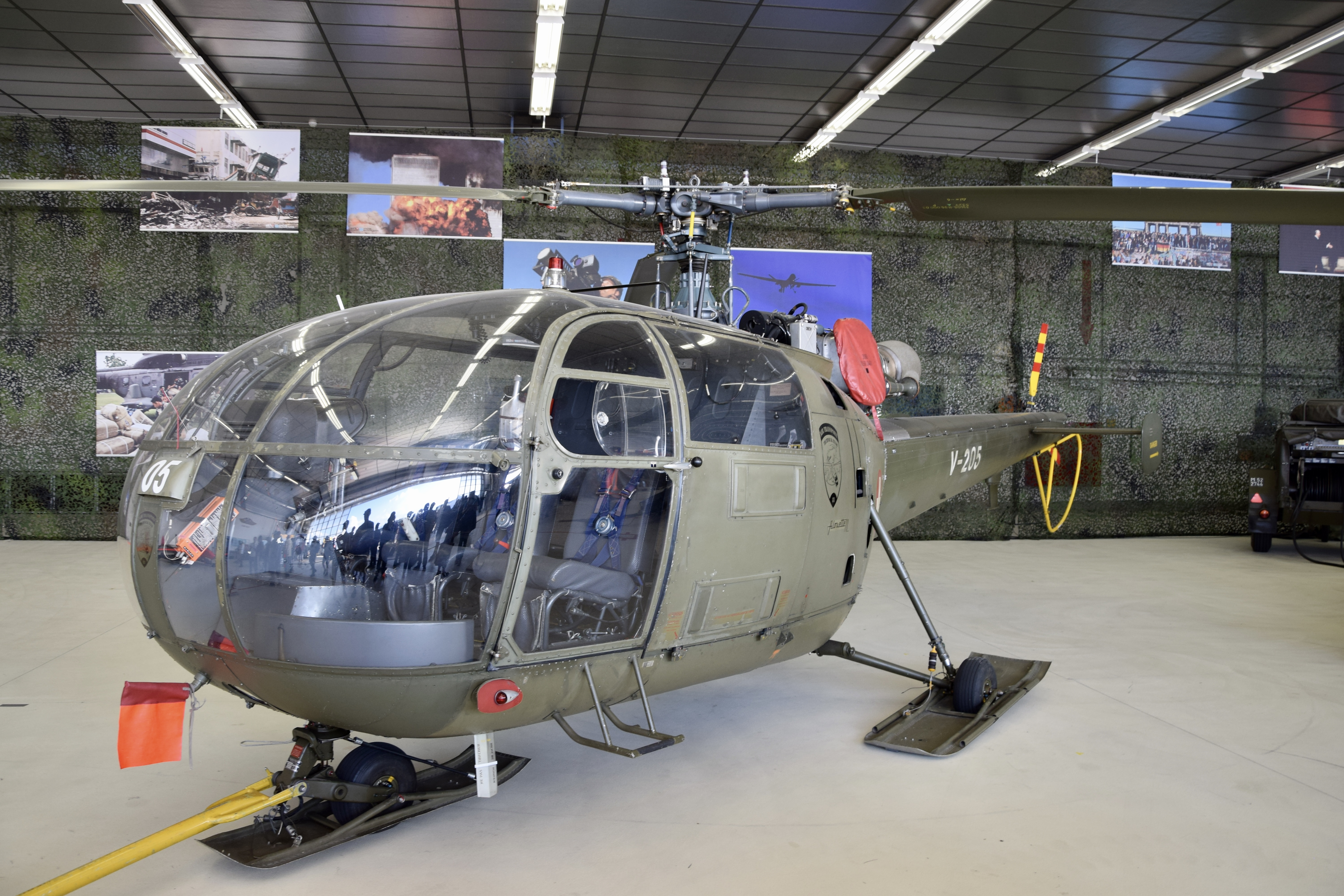
Alouette III

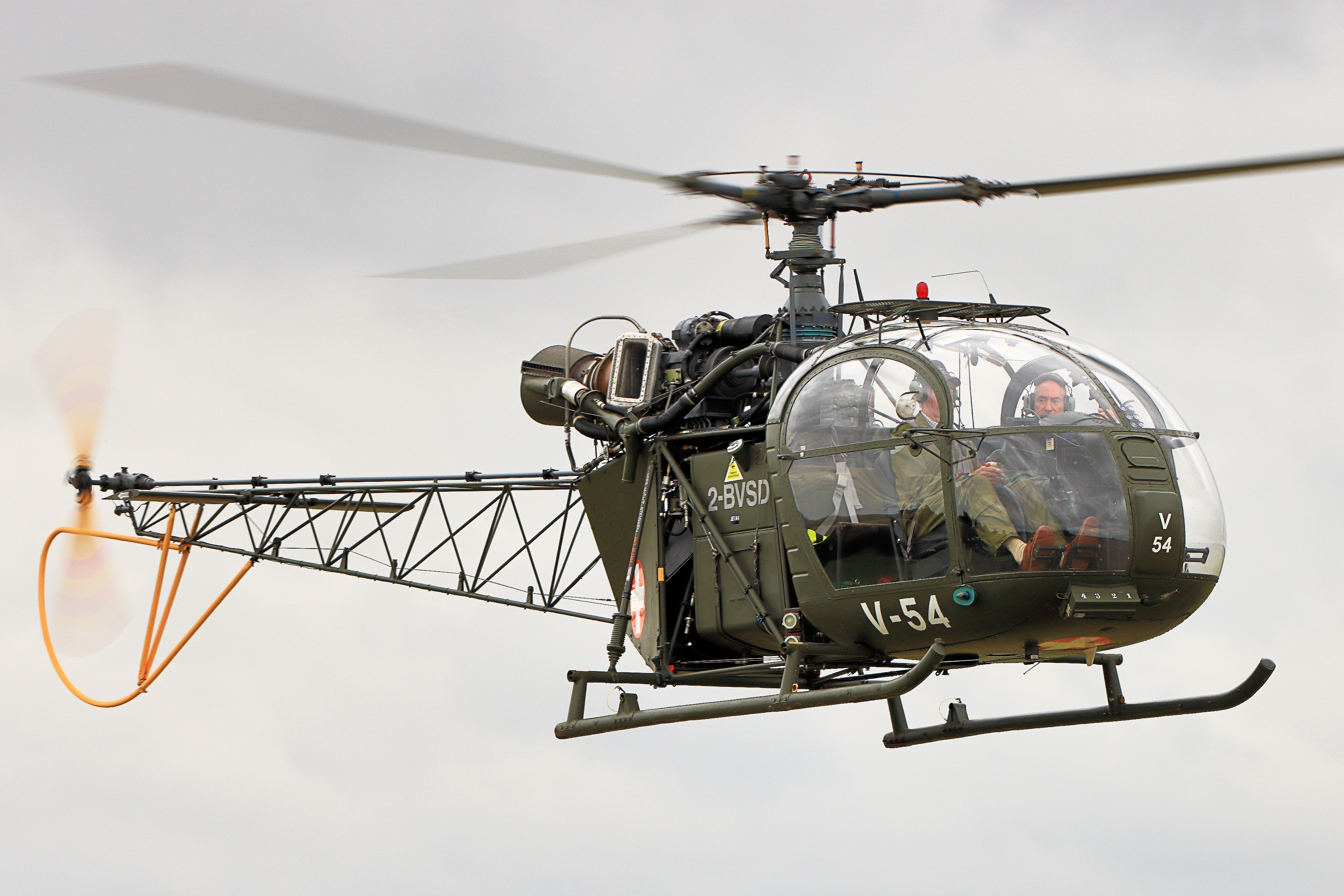
Alouette II

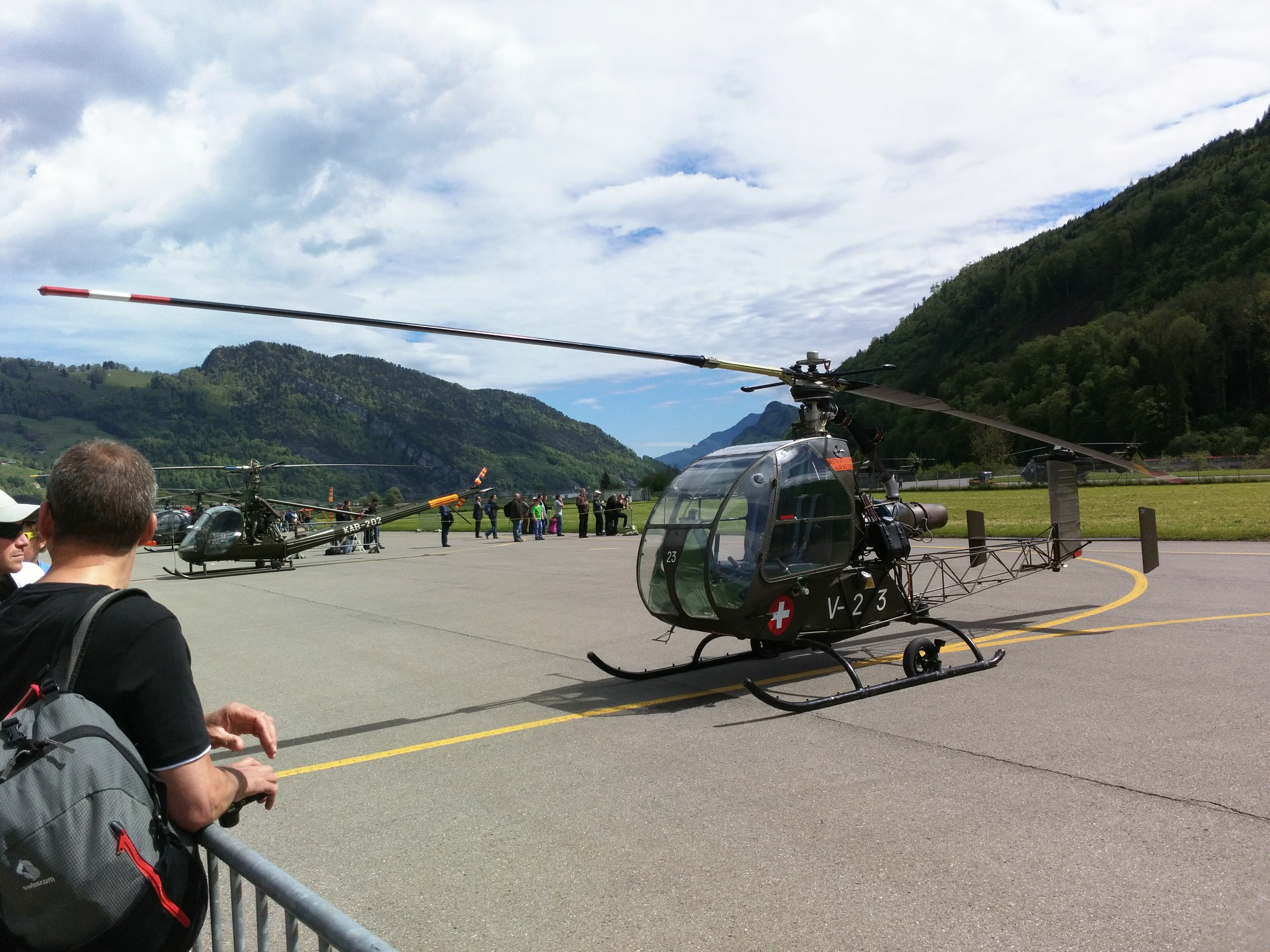
Sud-Ouest Djinn
