= List of aerospace flight test centres =

Flight test centres around the world all have similar missions: to conduct flight research and testing of new aircraft concepts and prototypes. Notable centres are listed below (by year of foundation):

== Government establishments ==
- U.K. Aeroplane and Armament Experimental Establishment, based at Boscombe Down, England (founded 1917)
- U.S. Navy Air Warfare Test Center, based at Naval Air Station Patuxent River, Maryland, United States (founded 1918, as the Navy's Flight Test Group based at Naval Air Station Anacostia)
- Swedish Armed Forces Flight Test and Evaluation Center (FMV:PROV is a part of FMV), based at Linköping, Sweden (founded 1933)
- Italian Air Force Flight Test Center (Reparto Sperimentale di Volo), based at Pratica di Mare (founded 1935)
- Russian State Flight Research and Test Center, based at Zhukovsky, Russia (founded 1941)
- I.N.T.A. Spanish Aerospace Research and Test Center, based at Torrejón de Ardoz, Community of Madrid, Spain (founded 1942)
- CLAEX Spanish Air Force Experimentation Center, based at Torrejón de Ardoz, Spain (founded 1992)
- U.S. Air Force Test Center, based at Edwards Air Force Base, California, United States (founded 1942, as the new location of 477th Air Base Headquarters and Test Squadron)
- Flight Test Center (CEV) of the French Ministry of Armed Forces (CEV is a part of Directorate General of Armaments ), based at 217 Air Base in Brétigny-sur-Orge, France (founded 1945)
- NASA Flight Research Center, based at Edwards Air Force Base, California, United States (founded 1946, as the Muroc Flight Test Unit)
- NRC Flight Research Laboratory, based at Ottawa and Montreal, Canada (founded 1951, as the National Aeronautical Establishment - NAE)
- Brazilian Air Force Flight Testing and Research Institute (part of CTA), São José dos Campos, Brazil (founded 1953)
- Japan Air Self-Defense Force Flight Test Center, based at Gifu Air Field, Japan (founded 1955)
- DLR German Aerospace Research and Test Center, based at Braunschweig, Germany (founded 1956)
- WTD 61 German Armed Forces Flight Test Center, based at Manching, Germany (founded 1957 as Testing Center for Military Aerial Equipment at Oberpfaffenhofen)
- Indian Air Force Test Pilot School, Bangalore, India (founded 1957)
- U.S. Army Aviation Technical Test Center, currently based at Redstone Arsenal, Huntsville, Alabama, United States (founded 1957, as the U.S. Army Aviation Test Board based at Fort Rucker)
- China Flight Test Establishment, based at Xi'an, China (founded 1959)
- Swiss Air Force Flight Test Center (aviation branch of the Swiss Federal Office for Defence Procurement), based at Emmen Air Base, Emmen, Switzerland (founded 1964)
- Aerospace Engineering Test Establishment, based at Cold Lake, Alberta, and Ottawa, Ontario, Canada (founded 1967, as the Royal Canadian Air Force Flight Test and Evaluation Squadron No. 448)
- Israeli Air Force Flight Test Center (Manat), based at Tel Nof Airbase, Rehovot (founded 1978)
- JAXA Flight Research Center, based at Chofu Aerodrome, Nagoya Airfield and Taiki Aerospace Research Field

== Corporate establishments ==
- CASA Flight Test Center, based at the Getafe Air Base, Spain (founded 1924)
- SAAB Flight Test Center, based at Linköping, Sweden (founded 1932)
- BAE Systems Flight Test Center, based at Warton Aerodrome, England (founded 1947)
- Airbus Defence and Space Flight Test Center, based at Manching, Germany (founded 1962, as the Messerschmitt Company Flight Test Center)
- Sikorsky Development Flight Center, based at West Palm Beach, Florida, United States (founded 1977)
- TCOM Corporation production and flight test site (including the historic Weeksville Dirigible Hangar) for development of lighter-than-air technologies and testing airships, located at the former Naval Air Station Weeksville in Elizabeth City, North Carolina, United States (founded 1986)
- Bombardier Aerospace Flight Test Center (BFTC), based at the Dwight D. Eisenhower National Airport, Wichita, Kansas, United States (founded 1991, as reconstruction of the acquired in 1990 Learjet facility)
- Embraer Flight Test Center, based at Embraer Unidade aerodrome, Gavião Peixoto, Brazil (founded 2001)
- Bell Flight Research Center, based at Arlington, Texas, United States
- IAI Flight Test Center, based at Ben Gurion Airport, Israel

== See also ==
- List of test pilot schools
