= Air Development and Test Wing (JASDF) =

- 飛行開発実験団
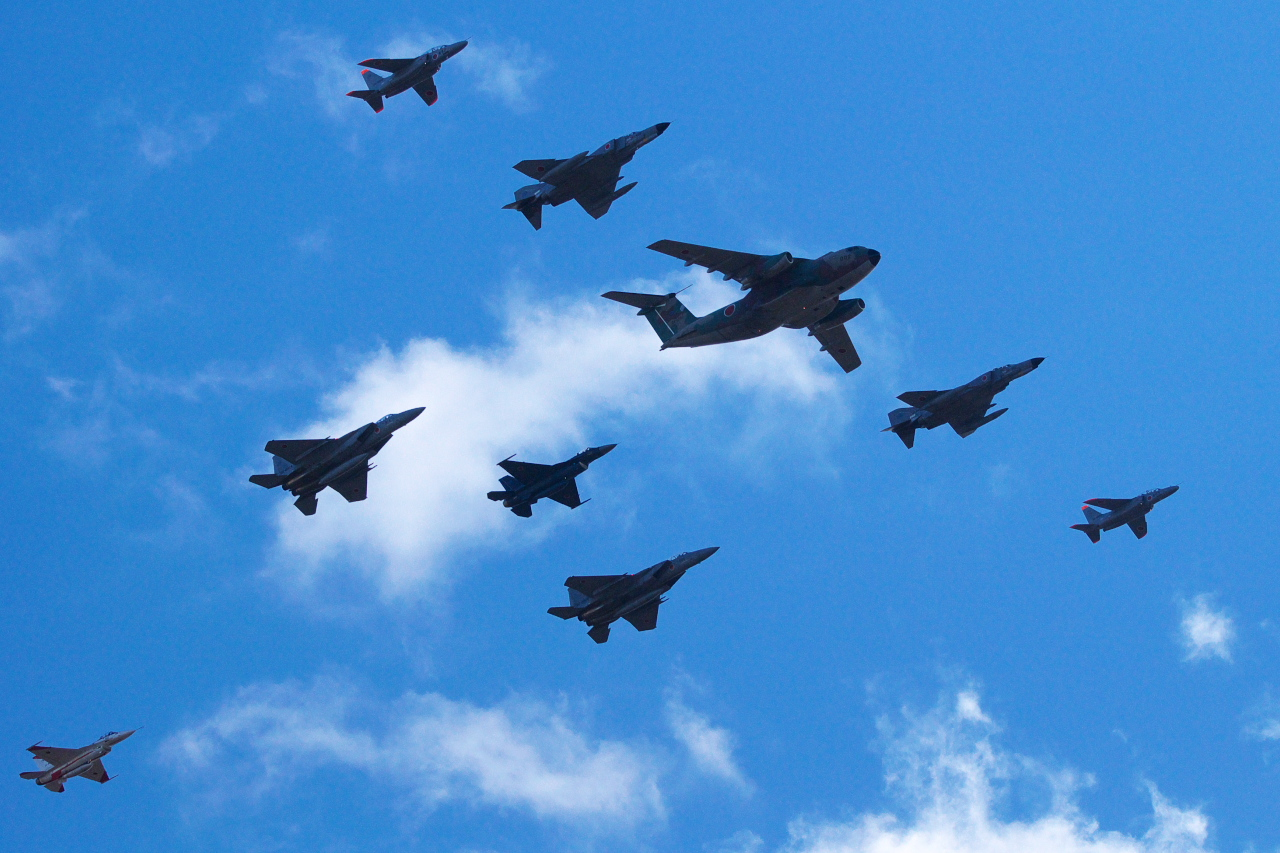
- ADTW aircraft in flight (2008)
- Active: December 1, 1955
- Country: Japan
- Branch: Japan Air Self-Defense Force
- Garrison/HQ: Gifu Air Field

The 飛行開発実験団 (Air Development and Test Wing, hikoukaihatsujikkendan) is the sole unit of the Air Development and Test Command of the Japan Air Self-Defense Force based at Gifu Air Field in Gifu Prefecture, Japan.

== Aircraft operated ==
- Kawasaki C-1FTB
- Kawasaki C-2
- Kawasaki T-4
- Fuji T-7
- McDonnell Douglas F-4EJ Kai Phantom II (1971–2021)
- Mitsubishi F-2
- Mitsubishi F-15J
- Mitsubishi X-2 Shinshin

== See also ==
- List of aerospace flight test centres
