= No. 448 Squadron RCAF =

448 Test Squadron
- Active: 20 June 1967 - 1 September 1971
- Disbanded: 1971
- Country: Canada
- Branch: Royal Canadian Air Force / Canadian Forces
- Role: aircraft test and evaluation
- Mottos: Latin: In agendo praestantie, lit. 'Excel at assigned tasks'

No. 448 Squadron RCAF was a test and evaluation squadron of the Royal Canadian Air Force (RCAF).

== History ==
From the formation of the Air Board, air service flight testing and research was based at the Ottawa Air Station, and conducted from Rockcliffe and Shirley's Bay. By 1930, a Test Flight was established at Rockcliffe. The Test Flight was expanded into the RCAF Test and Development Establishment in November 1940 to meet the demands of the Second World War; it was renamed to the Experimental and Proving Establishment in 1946. Additional units included the Winter Experimental Establishment at Edmonton, and the RCAF (National Research Council) Unit at Arnprior.

In 1951, all air force experimental units were amalgamated into the Central Experimental and Proving Establishment (CEPE). In 1957, CEPE headquarters moved from Rockcliffe to RCAF Station Uplands; jet aircraft testing required a longer runway. In 1954, CEPE's Air Armament Evaluation Detachment (AAED) was created at Cold Lake. In turn, AAED became 448 Test Squadron in 1967. In 1970, 448 Squadron, CEPE and the Royal Canadian Navy's 10 Experimental Squadron (1952) merged to create the Aerospace Engineering Test Establishment (AETE); 10 Squadron RCN disbanded on 1 July 1970. 448 Squadron was formally redesignated as Aerospace Engineering Test Establishment, Cold Lake in 1971.

== Aircraft tested ==
- Sikorsky H-34A
- Canadair/Lockheed CT-33 Silver Star
- de Havilland Canada DHC-1 Chipmunk (CT-120)
- Douglas CC-129 Dakota (DC-3)
- Avro CF-100 Canuck
- Canadair CF-104 Starfighter
- Canadair CF-5
- Sikorsky CH-124 Sea King

== See also ==
- List of aerospace flight test centres
