= Lufttransportdienst des Bundes =

Lufttransportdienst des Bundes (LTDB) Service de transport aérien de la Conféderation, (STAC) Federal Air Transport Service
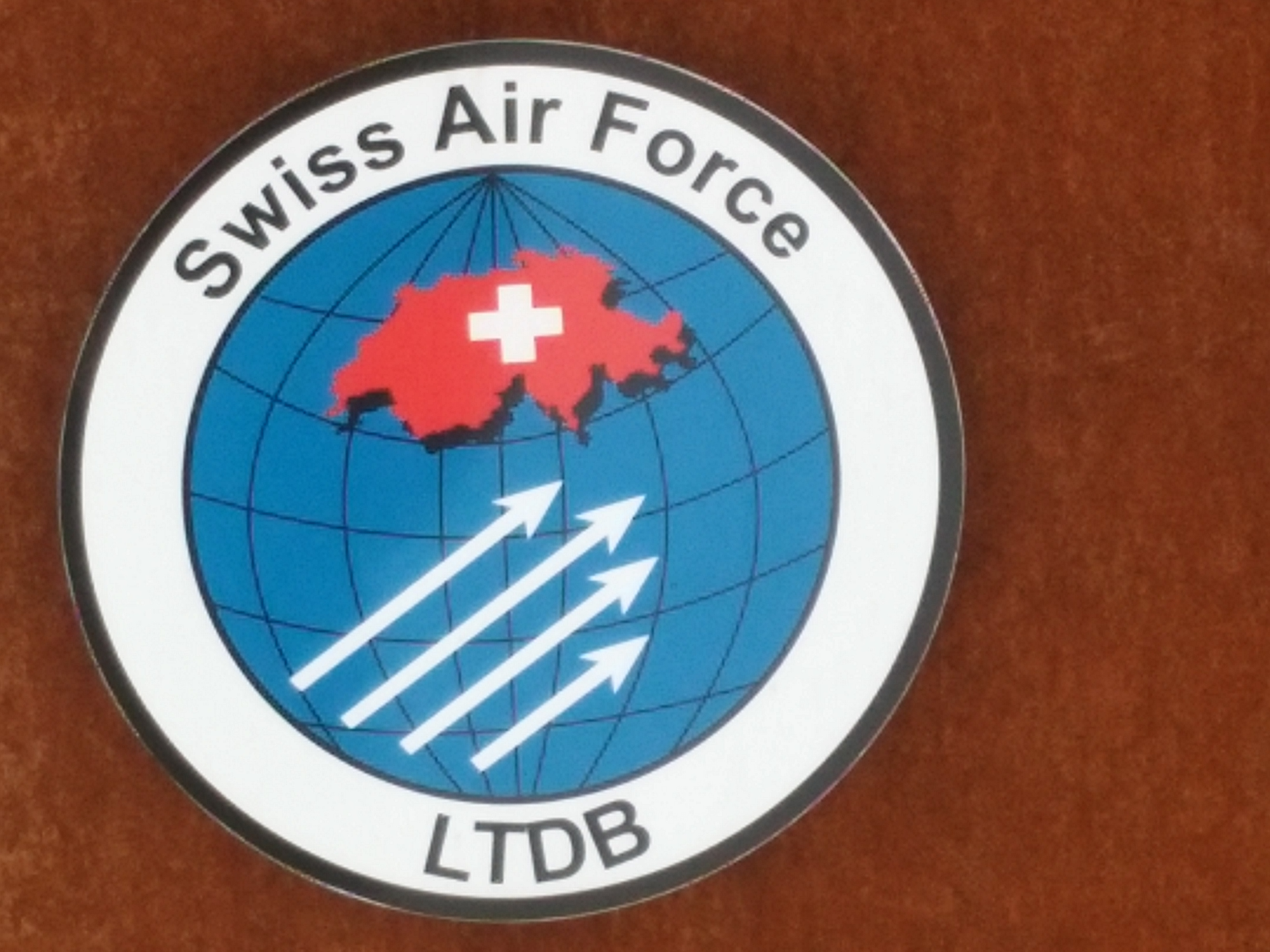
- Emblem LTDB
- Active: 1938-today
- Country: Switzerland
- Branch: Swiss Air Force
- Role: VIP Transport
- Garrison/HQ: Bern Airport

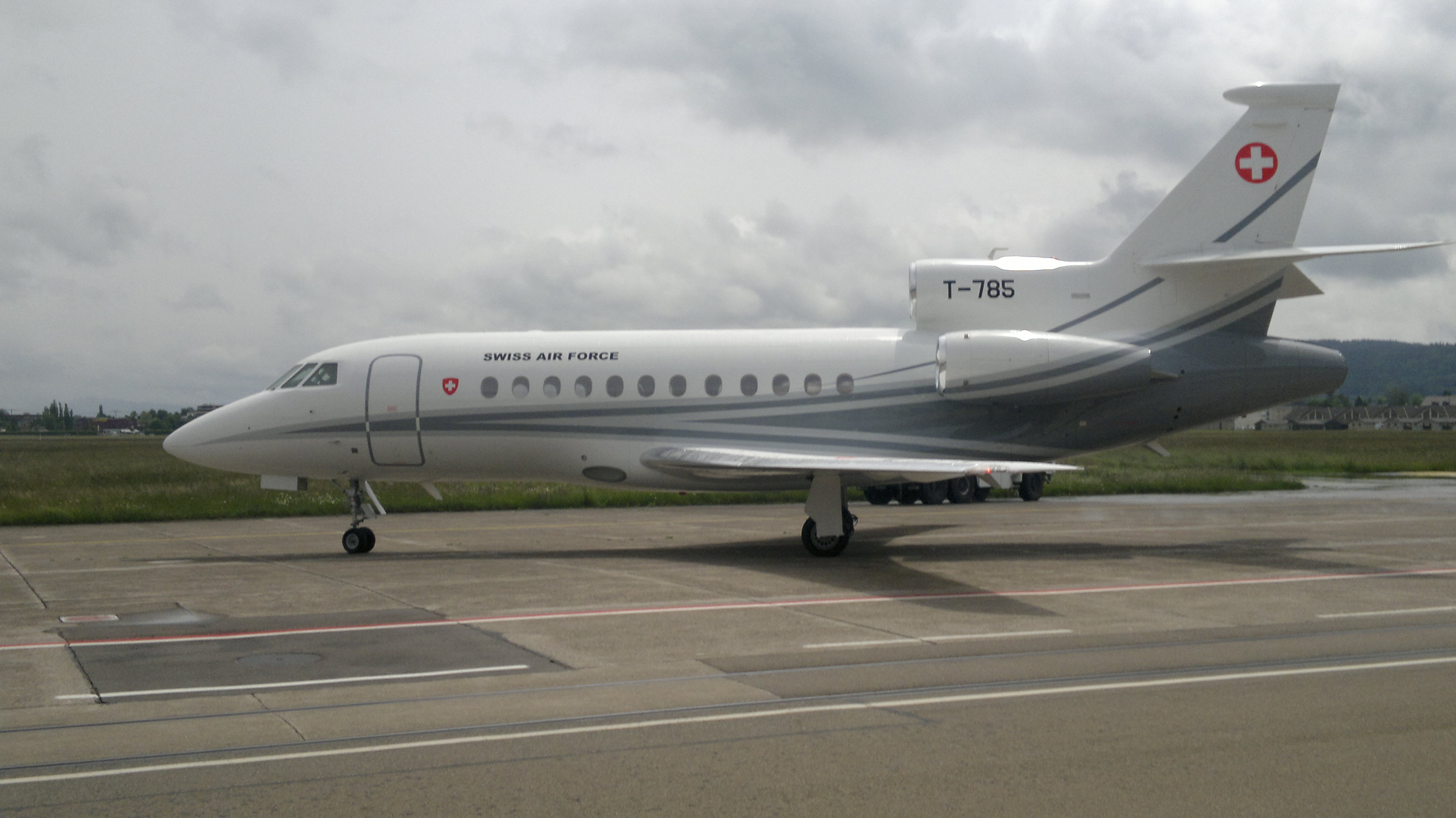
"Bundesratsjet" Dassault Falcon 900

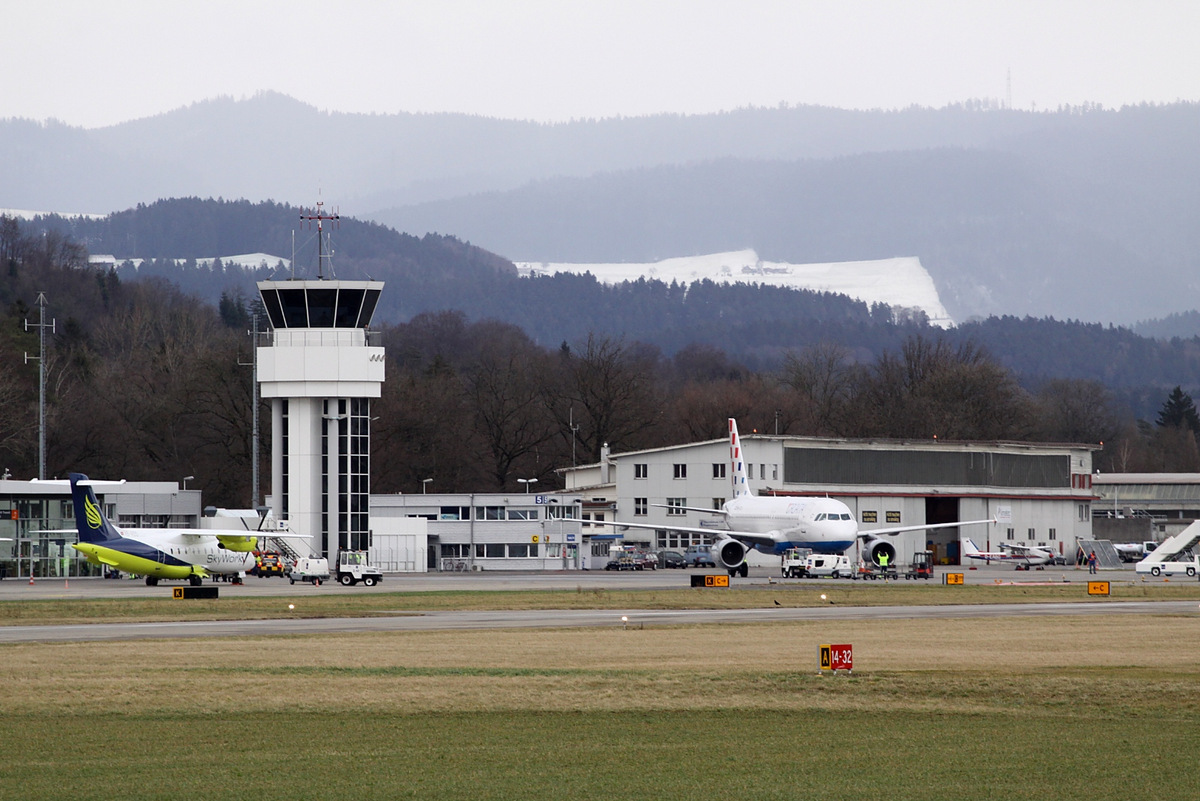
Flugplatz Belp

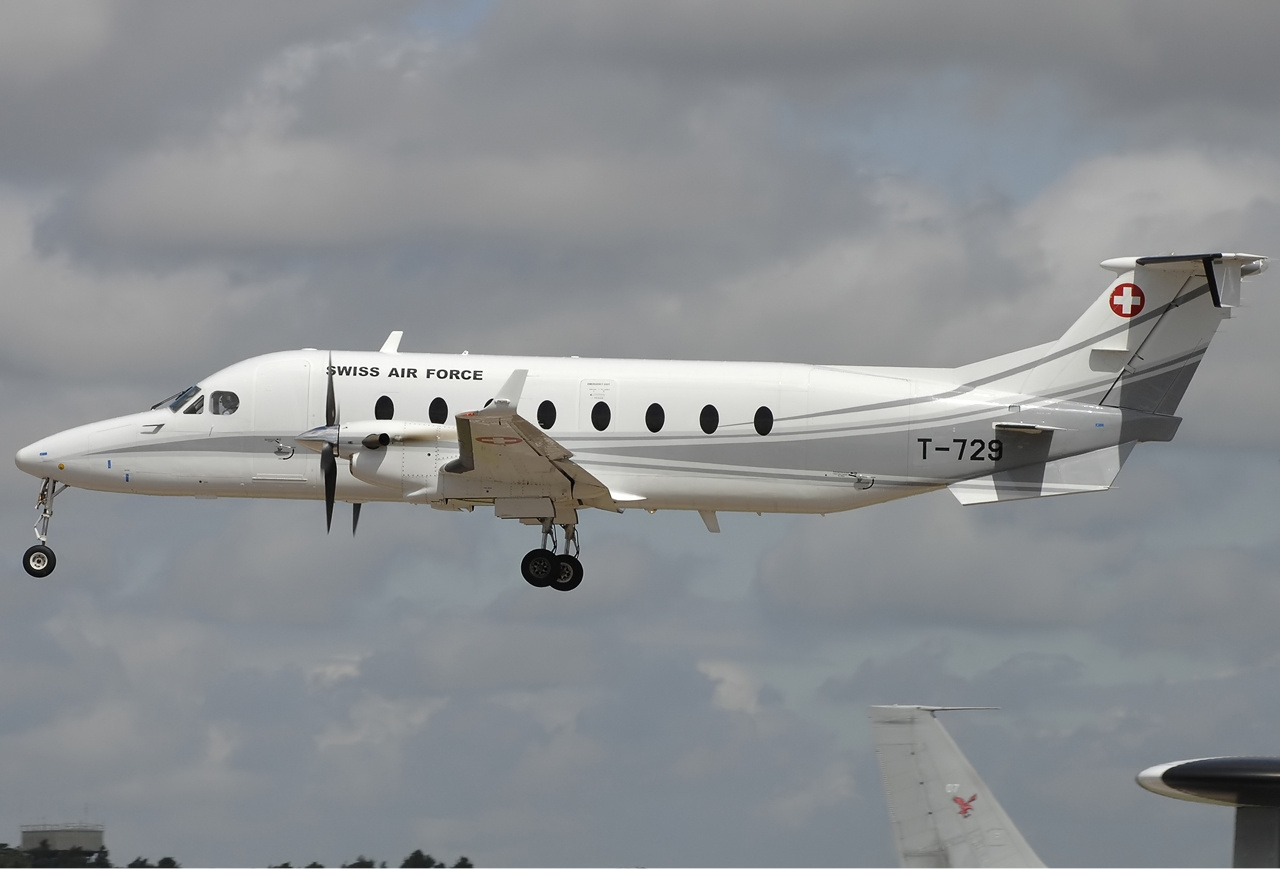
Beech 1900D T-729

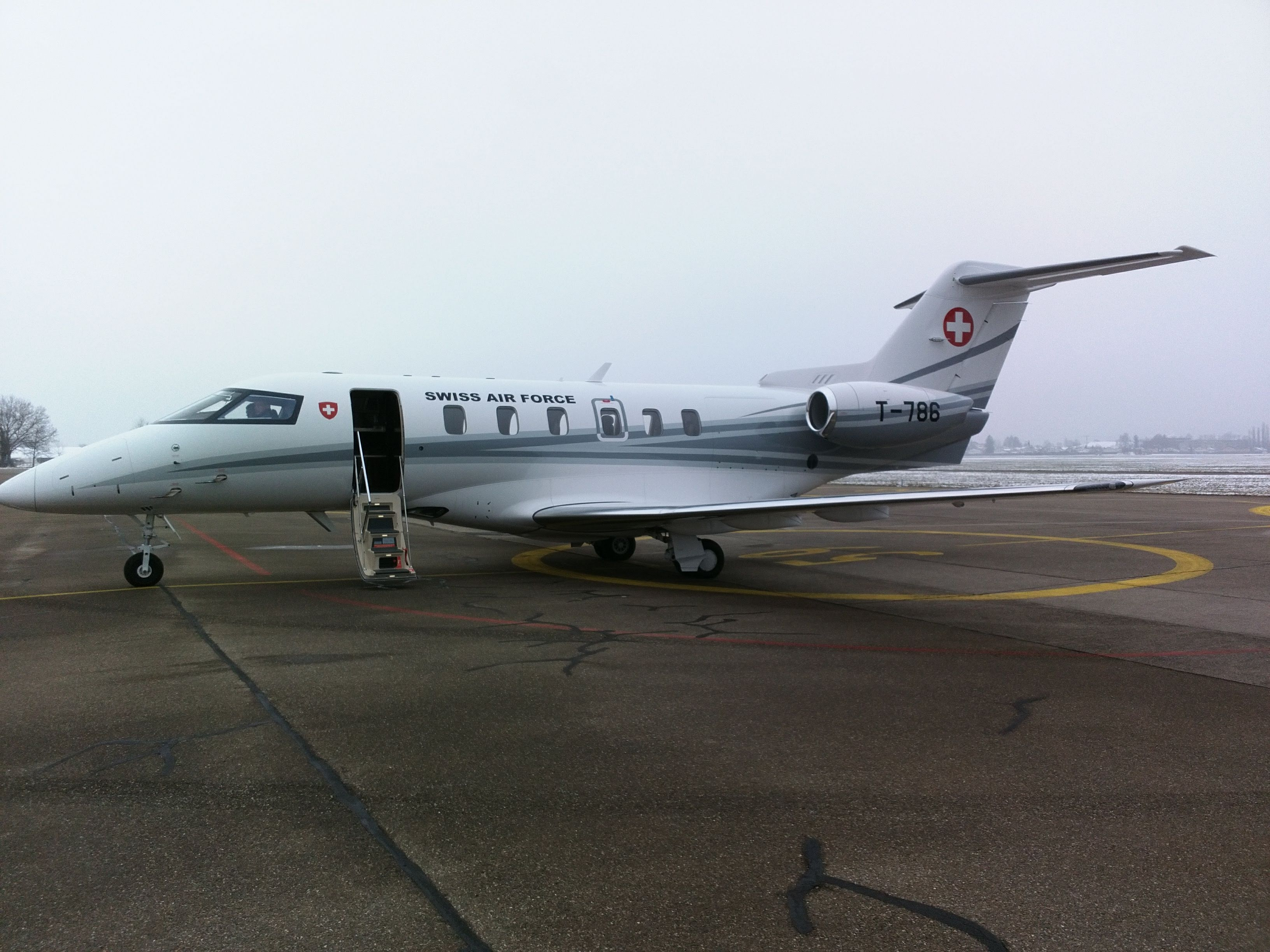
PC-24 T-786

The Lufttransportdienst des Bundes (LTDB) (English: Federal Air Transport Service, French:Service de transport aérien de la Conféderation, (STAC)), operates the aircraft and helicopters of the Swiss government. The LTDB is located at Bern Airport. Since 2005, the LTDB has been part of the Swiss Air Force. Prior to that, she was assigned to the Federal Office of Civil Aviation.

== History ==
With the appointment of Messerschmitt Bf 109 fighter aircraft in 1938, the Swiss Air Force also ordered 15 Messerschmitt Bf 108B aircraft for pilot training. With their four-seat cabin, the Me-108 received the secondary task of transporting military commanders between airfields. After the war diplomatic guests were also transported.

By the middle of the 1950s, the remaining Bf 108s had accumulated fatigue damage that required the Swiss Air Force to procure three Beechcraft Twin Bonanza E-50 as a replacement. These aircraft were also used to transport federal officials, and served for 30 years. Until the introduction of the Eurocopter AS332 Super Puma, three Junkers Ju 52, which were procured in 1939, also took on official transport tasks. In 1987 the Swiss Air Force bought two Learjet 35A from Rega. One of these aircraft remained in the service of the Swiss Air Force until 2006.

By combining with the fleet of the Federal Office of Civil Aviation, which was responsible for state flights, the Swiss Air Force took over all official transport duties on 1 January 2005, and the formerly civilian operated Eurocopter AS365 Dauphins, for example, received military tail numbers.

== Fleet ==
The fleet of the LTDB includes two jet aircraft, three turboprop aircraft and two helicopters. The former are mainly used for the VIP transport, in particular by members of the Federal Council, which is why they are often called Bundesratsjets. However, the LTDB fleet is also used for other purposes, for example for deportation flights or to support international peacekeeping missions.

The jets are the Dassault Falcon 900EX (T-785) and Cessna Citation Excel (T-784), which can accommodate up to six passengers each, and a Pilatus PC-24 (T-786). The aircraft were put into service in September 2002, May 2013 and in December 2018 respectively. It was intended to replace the Beech 1900 with the two former Rega CL 604s (T-751 & T-752), and former HB-JRB & HB-JRC (T-786), in April 2019.

The two turboprops DHC-6 Twin Otter (T-741) and Beechcraft Super King Air (T-721) are usually not used for VIP flights, but for transporting other passengers as well as well as for Swisstopo. The Beechcraft 1900 (T-729) is used for the same tasks apart from the Swisstopo. If necessary, the Swiss Air Force/Federal Air Transport Service can also use the Pilatus PC-12 HB-FOG of Armasuisse for transport tasks. The Armasuisse DA-42 OPA (R-711) can be used as liaison aircraft.

The two Eurocopter EC 135s (T-351 and T-352) are used as helicopters.

The Swiss Air Force also serves the aircraft of the Federal Office for Civil Aviation at Belp Airport, which has its home airport there. These are the following aircraft and helicopters:

- HB-GPC Beechcraft Baron 58
- HB-KEY Robin DR400 /500
- HB-KEZ Robin DR400 /500
- HB-KIA Beechcraft Bonanza A36
- HB-POP Piper PA-46 350P Malibu Mirage
- HB-XQE AgustaWestland AW109E
- HB-XVA Eurocopter AS350 ÉcureuilB2
- HB-ZKO AgustaWestland AW119 Koala
- HB-FWA Pilatus PC-12
