= Gifu Air Field =

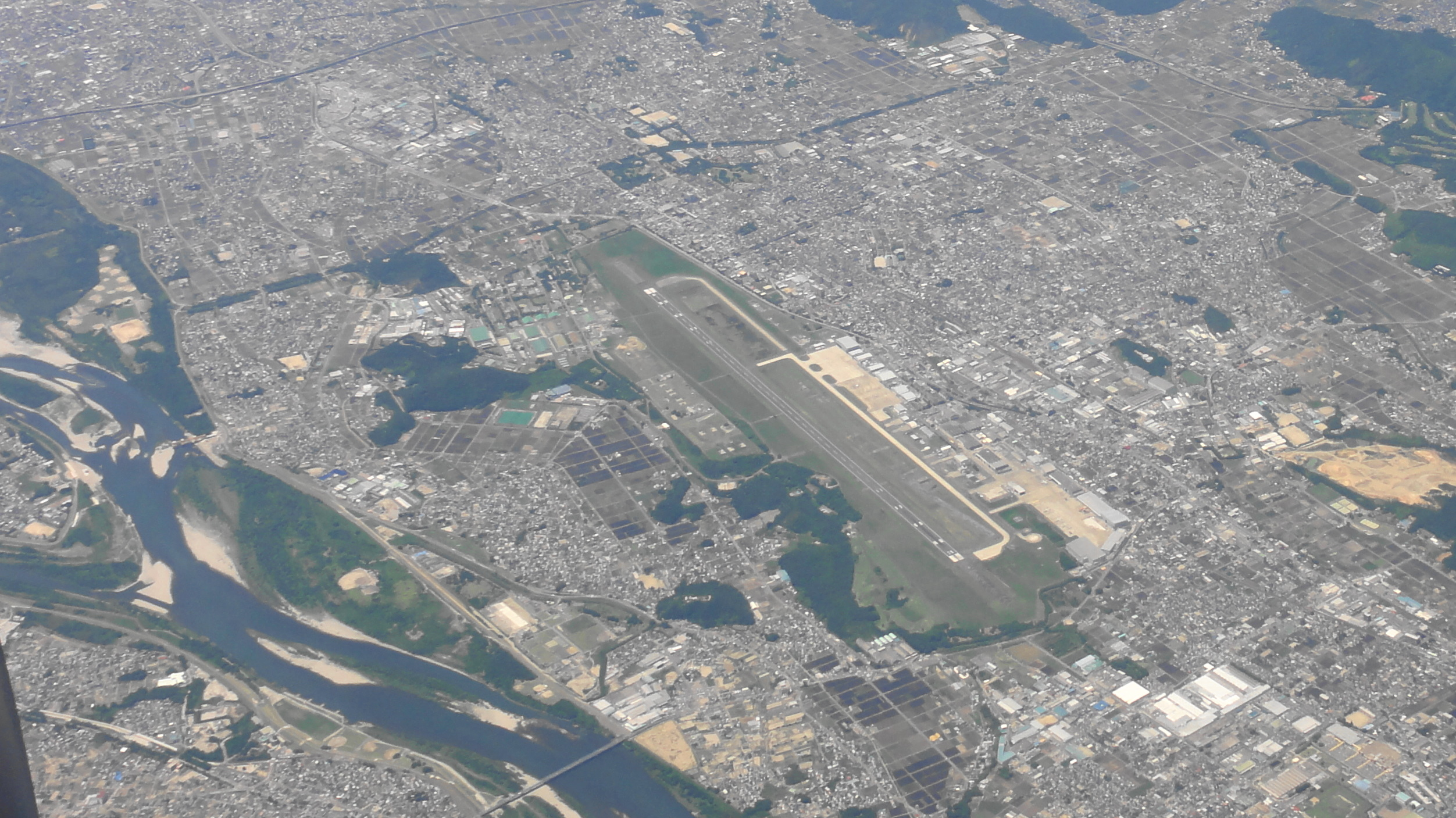
- IATA: none; ICAO: RJNG

Summary
- Airport type: Military air base
- Operator: Japan Air Self-Defense Force
- Location: Gifu, Japan
- Elevation AMSL: 128 ft (39 m)
- Coordinates: 35°23′40″N 136°52′10″E

Map
- Location in Japan

Runways
Direction	Length		Surface
Direction	m	ft	Surface
10/28	2,700	8,858	Asphalt
- Source: Japanese AIP at AIS Japan

Gifu Air Field (岐阜飛行場, Gifu Hikōjō) (ICAO: RJNG) is a military air base of the Japan Air Self-Defense Force Gifu Airbase (岐阜基地, Gifu Kichi). It is located in Kakamigahara City, 7.0 NM (13.0 km; 8.1 mi) east of Gifu in the Gifu Prefecture, Japan. It is home to the Kakamigahara Air and Space Museum.

== Units ==
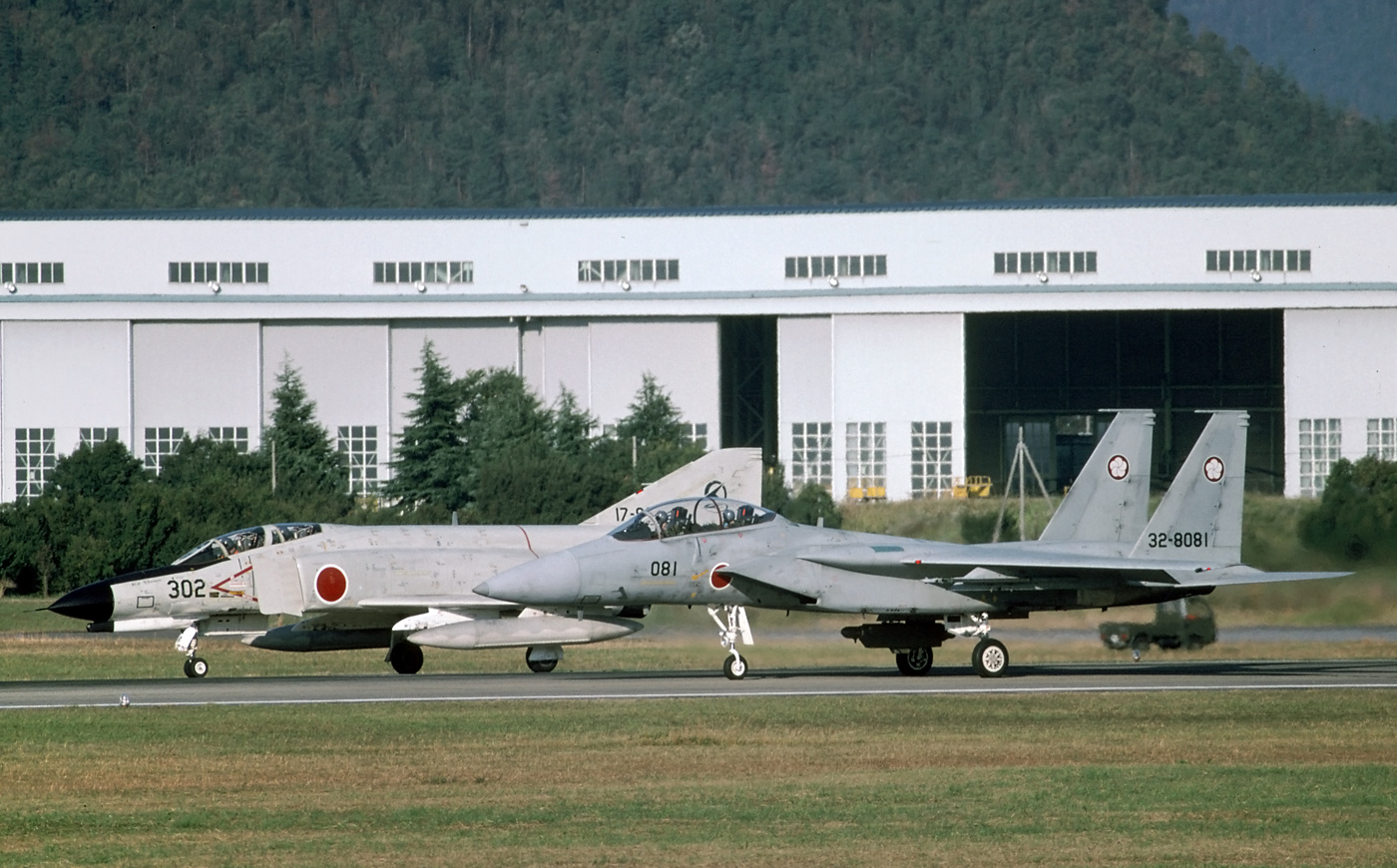
A Mitsubishi F-4EJ Kai Phantom of the Air Development and Test Wing and a Mitsubishi F-15J of the 305th Tactical Fighter Squadron at Gifu Air Field.

- Air Defense Command
  - Central Air Defense Force
    - 4th Air Defence Missile Group
      - 13th Fire Unit
      - 15th Fire Unit
- Air Development and Test Command
  - Air Development and Test Wing
- Air Material Command
  - 2nd Air Depot

== Operated aircraft ==
  - Mitsubishi F-2
  - Mitsubishi XF-2
  - McDonnell Douglas (Mitsubishi) F-15J/DJ Eagle
  - Kawasaki C-1
  - Kawasaki XC-2
  - Kawasaki T-4
  - Fuji T-7
