= KZD-85 =

Type of aircraft

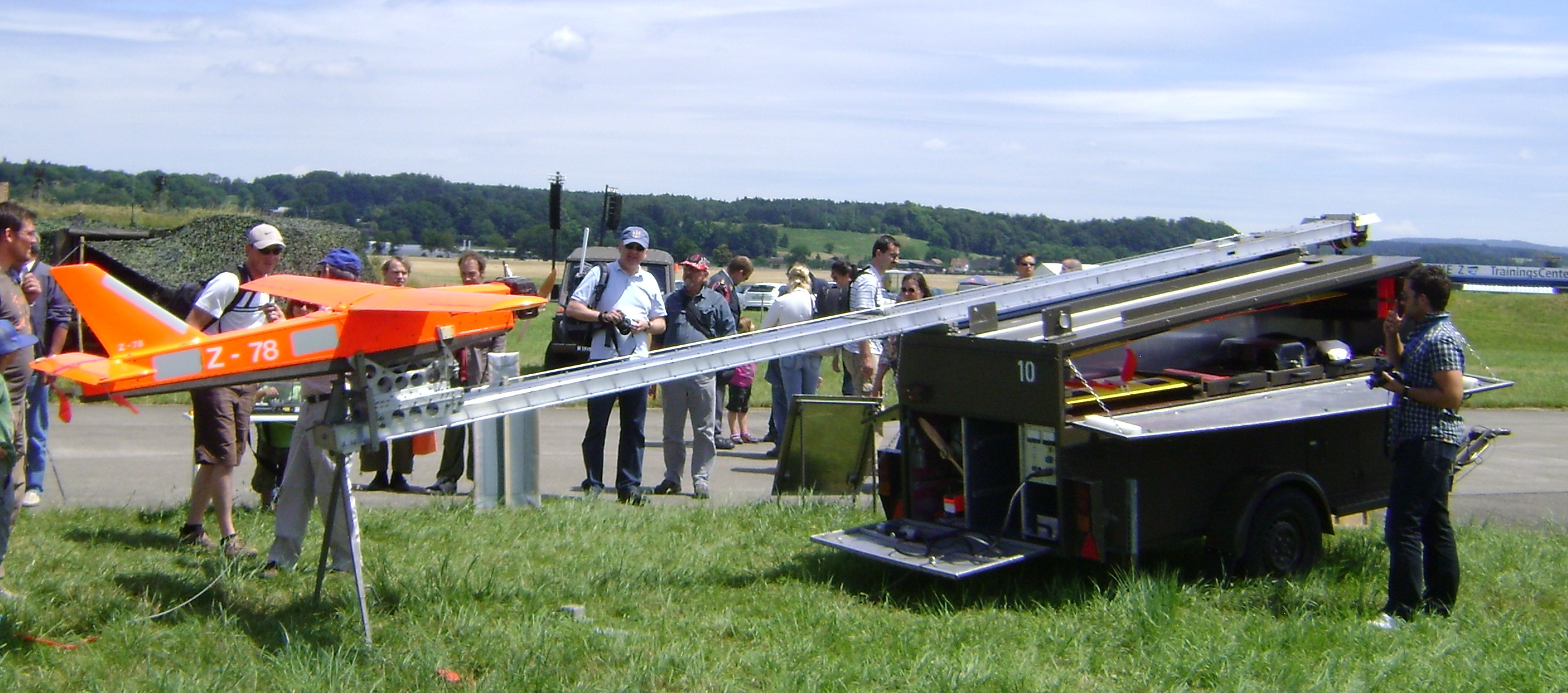
KZD-85 and catapult vehicle on display at Dübendorf Air Base

Starting the KZD-85

Landing KZD-85

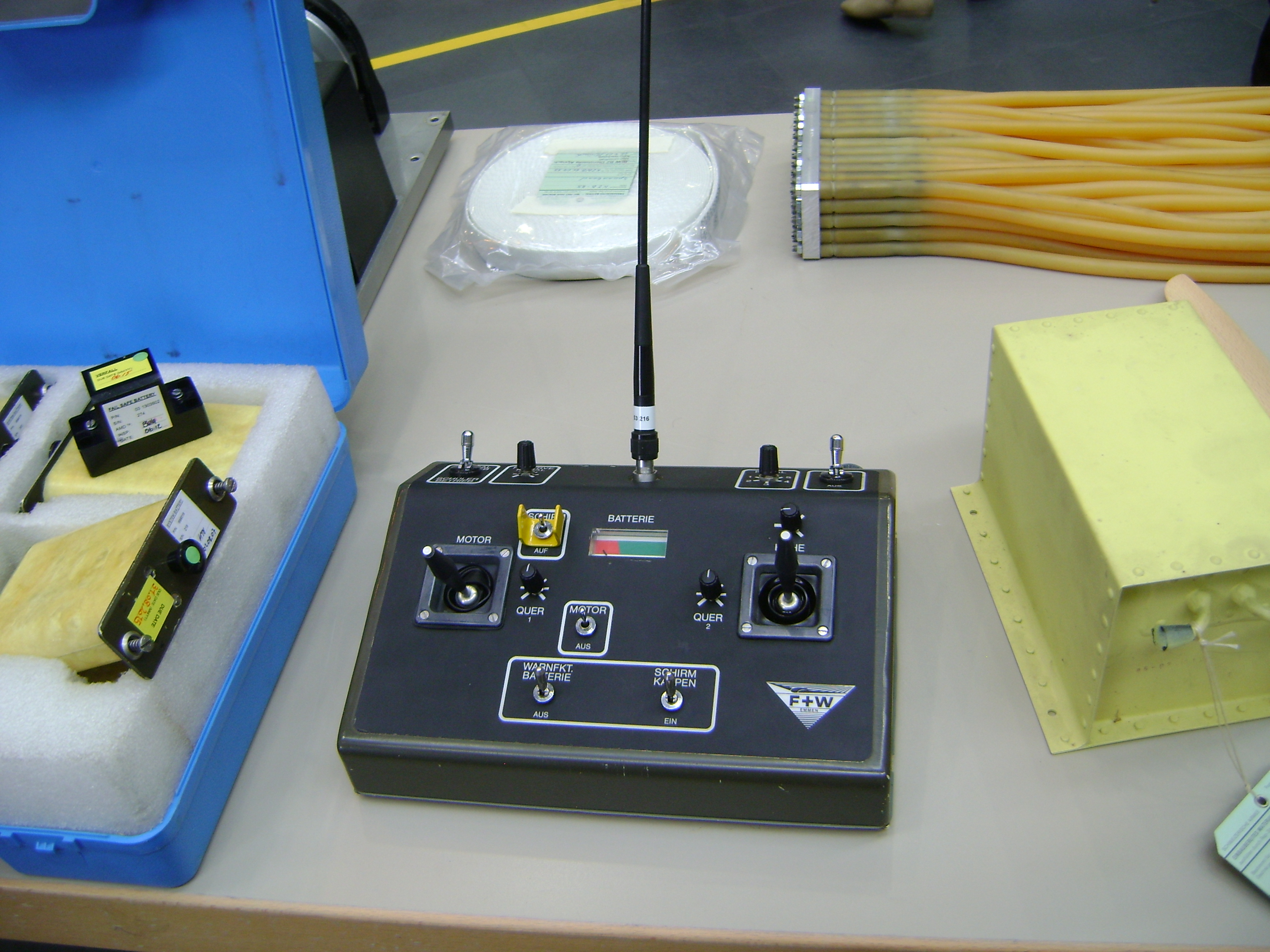
Radio control for the KZD-85

KZD-85 is a UAV system that was designed by Farner AG Grenchen. The aerospace enterprise RUAG Aviation is now responsible for it. KZD-85 stands for the German words “Klein Ziel Drohne” (small target drone).

== Operation ==
The KZD-85 uses a compact launcher and a parachute-based landing system that enables the UAV to land nearly anywhere. Gliding landings on grass or snow are also possible. It is used as a training target (for aiming, but not shooting) for the Oerlikon 35 mm twin cannon, the FIM-92 Stinger, and the Rapier missile. There are no sensors built in; "hits" are determined by the surface reflection of the laser from the target device.

== Operators ==
The KZD-85 system was used by the Swiss Air Force from 1985 to 2022.

- Switzerland

== Technical data ==
- Type: Target UAV
- Range: up to 2.5 km (1.6 mi)
