= RUAG Ranger =

Swiss-Israeli military surveillance drone

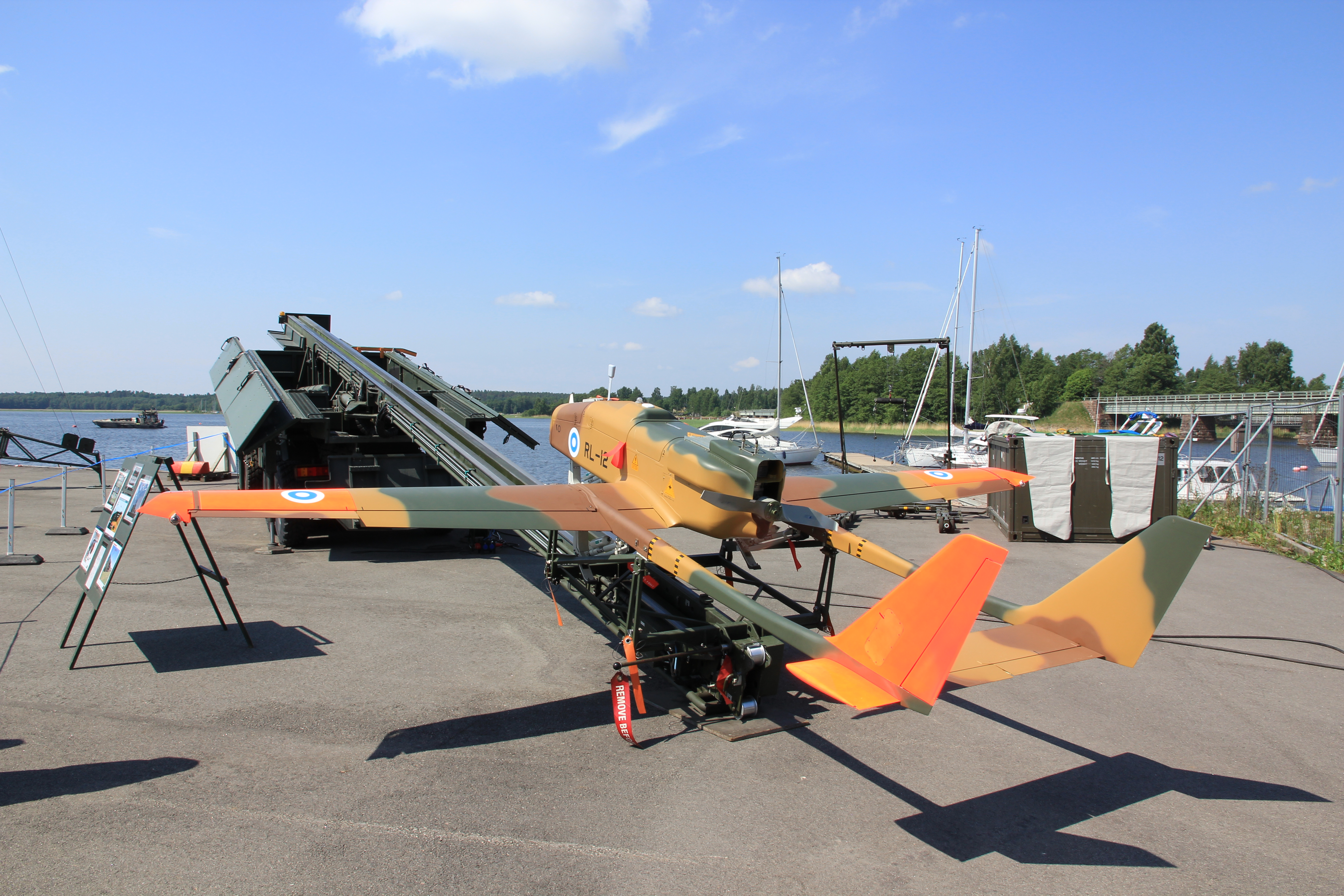
Finnish army Ranger UAV and catapult vehicle on display in Ekenäs

RANGER is a tactical UAV system (TUAV) built as a Swiss-Israeli joint venture between Swiss aerospace enterprise RUAG Aviation and Israeli aerospace company Israel Aerospace Industries. Its design and some of its technology is based on the Scout UAV system by Israel Aerospace Industries.

The RANGER UAV uses a compact hydraulic launcher for takeoff. Due to a modular payload, the system can be adapted to a wide range of civilian and military missions. A skid-based landing system enables the UAV to land nearly anywhere, on grass or on concrete runways, on snow or ice. According to the manufacturer, RANGER is the only tactical UAV system worldwide certified to fly in civilian airspace as well as over populated areas. The prototype is now at the Flieger-Flab-Museum in Dübendorf.

== Operators ==
The consortium delivered the first Ranger system to the Swiss Air Force in June 1999 upon successful completion of military exercise conducted by the Swiss Armed Forces.

The RANGER system is in service with the Swiss Air Force under the designation ADS-95. From 1988 to 1999, an earlier variant called ADS-90 was in use. The Air Force's RANGERs are also used by Swiss police for reconnaissance, search and rescue missions. The current 15 ADS-95 will be replaced until 2019 by six Elbit Hermes 900. The last flight of a Swiss Air Force ADS-95 (D-124) was on 27 November 2017.

The RANGER is also in service with the Finnish Defence Forces (FDF).

== Former operators ==
Switzerland (28)
The drone were ordered with the Armament Programme 1995 for a budget of CHF 350 million, and they enetered service in 1999. Four systems were supplied, each equipped with:
- 7 UAV
- 2 catapults (electro-hydraulic)
- 2 mobile ground control stations, one of which has an automatic landing system
- 2 mobile data receiving stations
- 1 logistics setIt used to be operated by the Swiss Air Force 7th Unmanned Aerial Vehicle Squadron (German: Drohnen Staffel 7), at Emmen Air Base.

Finland (12)
12 drones were operated by the Finnish Army.

== Technical data ==
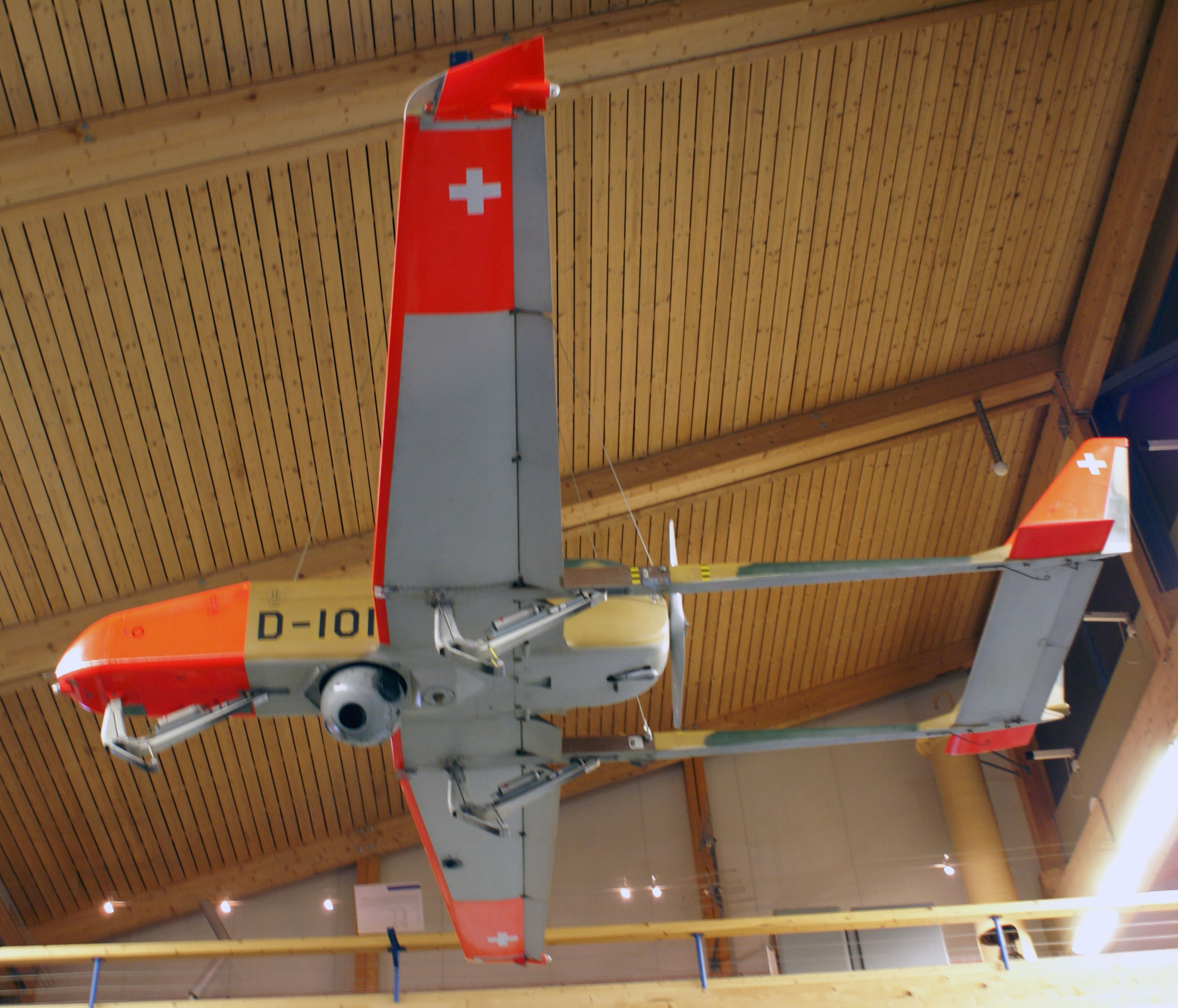
The ADS-90 prototype.

Swiss confederation data:

- Type: Tactical reconnaissance UAV
- Dimension
  - Length: 4.61 m (15.1 ft)
  - Height: 1.13 m (3.7 ft)
  - Wingspan: 5.71 m (18.7 ft)
- Weight
  - Maximum take-off weight: 285 kg (628 lb)
  - Payload: 45 kg (99 lb)
- Propulsion
  - Engine type: 2 cylinder 2 stroke
  - performance: 31.5 kW (42.8 PS)
- Flight performance
  - Max speed: 220 km/h (140 mph)
  - Service ceiling: 4,500 m (14,800 ft)
  - Range: 100 km (62 mi)
  - Endurance: up to 9 hours
- Sensors
  - Reconnaissance altitude: 1,000 to 3,000 m (3,300 to 9,800 ft) above the ground
  - Detection range for a main battle tank with a visibility range of 10 km (6.2 mi):
    - TV (day-time): 2.7 to 8.5 km (1.7 to 5.3 mi)
    - IR (night-time): 2.4 to 5.8 km (1.5 to 3.6 mi)
  - Data transmission live
