= Armasuisse =

Swiss defence company

Federal Office for Defence Procurement
- (in German) Bundesamt für Rüstung (in French) Office fédéral de l’armement (in Italian) Ufficio federale dell’armamento

Agency overview
- Jurisdiction: Federal administration of Switzerland
- Headquarters: Bern
- Minister responsible: Martin Pfister, Federal Councillor
- Parent agency: Federal Department of Defence, Civil Protection and Sports
- Website: www.ar.admin.ch

The Federal Office for Defence Procurement (Armasuisse) is a federal agency of the Swiss Confederation. It is the procurement organization for armaments of Switzerland and is affiliated with the Federal Department of Defence, Civil Protection and Sport.

Armasuisse employs around 750 people. The budget was 217 million Swiss francs in 2006. National Armaments Director is Dr. Urs Loher.

The Armasuisse group covers many skills as a provider with a broad field of activity. This ranges from the evaluation, procurement, maintenance and liquidation of materials and systems for the Comprehensive Real Estate Management in VBS to ensuring scientific and technical services. Its main client and partner is the army.

== History ==
The forerunner of Armasuisse was the War Technical Department, which was subordinated to the army leadership until the so-called Mirage Affair of 1964 took place. In the mid-1960s, it was named as the Armament Services Group (GRD) a separate organizational unit, on a par with (among others) the General Staff Services Group. Since that time, the chief executive of the GRD is called the Chief of Armament and is equivalent in rank to a corps commander. In 1994 it was renamed to the Armament Group (GR). In 2001, the Federal Office of Topography of the Armament Group was formed. Finally, in 2003 the group was divided into RUAG (with all maintenance and production operations of GR) and Armasuisse (procurement and related technical and scientific bodies).

== Organization ==
The Armasuisse was divided by mid-2008 in six areas of competence:

- Federal Office for Command, Telematics and Training Systems (BFTA), especially in Bern
- Federal Office for weapons systems, vehicles and equipment (FWVE), especially in Bern
- Federal Office of Topography in Wabern near Bern
- Real Estate (responsible for 260 square kilometers of land and 26,000 objects of the VBS), especially in Bern
- Science and technology (S & T) in Bern, Thun and Emmen
- Central Services, in Bern

The Federal structure was replaced by a competence structure in the fall of 2008, see below management.

== Management ==
CEO Dr. Urs Loher, National Armaments Director

- Resources and Support
- Competence of command and reconnaissance systems
- Competence of Land systems
- Competence Aeronautical Systems
- Shopping area of competence and cooperation
- Competence Estate
- Competence of science and technology

The procurement consists of the areas of competence management and intelligence systems, land systems, aerospace systems, purchasing and cooperation. It is responsible for the active participation in the planning process of the customer, strategic procurement and sales management, the operational implementation of evaluation, acquisition, sale, disposal and the support of the use and maintenance phases. The main partner is the Defence sector, represented in particular by the Planning Staff of the Army and Armed Forces Logistics. The planning staff is responsible for the defense planning, formulated as the customer needs of the army and sets out the requirements. Armasuisse takes in the procurement procedure to implement the requirements of the purchaser from the army and administration.

== Science and technology ==
The competence of science and technology of the VBS offers its technical and scientific achievements in four product categories: technology services for the Army systems (e.g., testing, analysis), risk analysis and safety concepts, quality management, and technology and research management. These include the technology monitoring, the implementation of research projects as well as national and international networking with universities, research, industry and multilateral research and development projects. S & T has a unique underground shooting channel. Services in the areas of ballistics, explosives diagnostics, electromagnetic compatibility, electronics and optronics are also available to private customers.

== armasuisse Real Estate ==
armasuisse Real Estate, the center of competence for real estate within the DDPS, is responsible for the overall management of 24,000 hectares of property as well as more than 13,000 buildings and facilities for the Federal Department of Defence, Civil Protection and Sport DDPS. Within the wide-ranging portfolio armasuisse Real Estate is responsible for implementing and planning existing and future customer needs, the management of objects in military use, the realisation of new developments and reconstructions, and for the sale and liquidation of infrastructure which is no longer needed.

== Aircraft ==
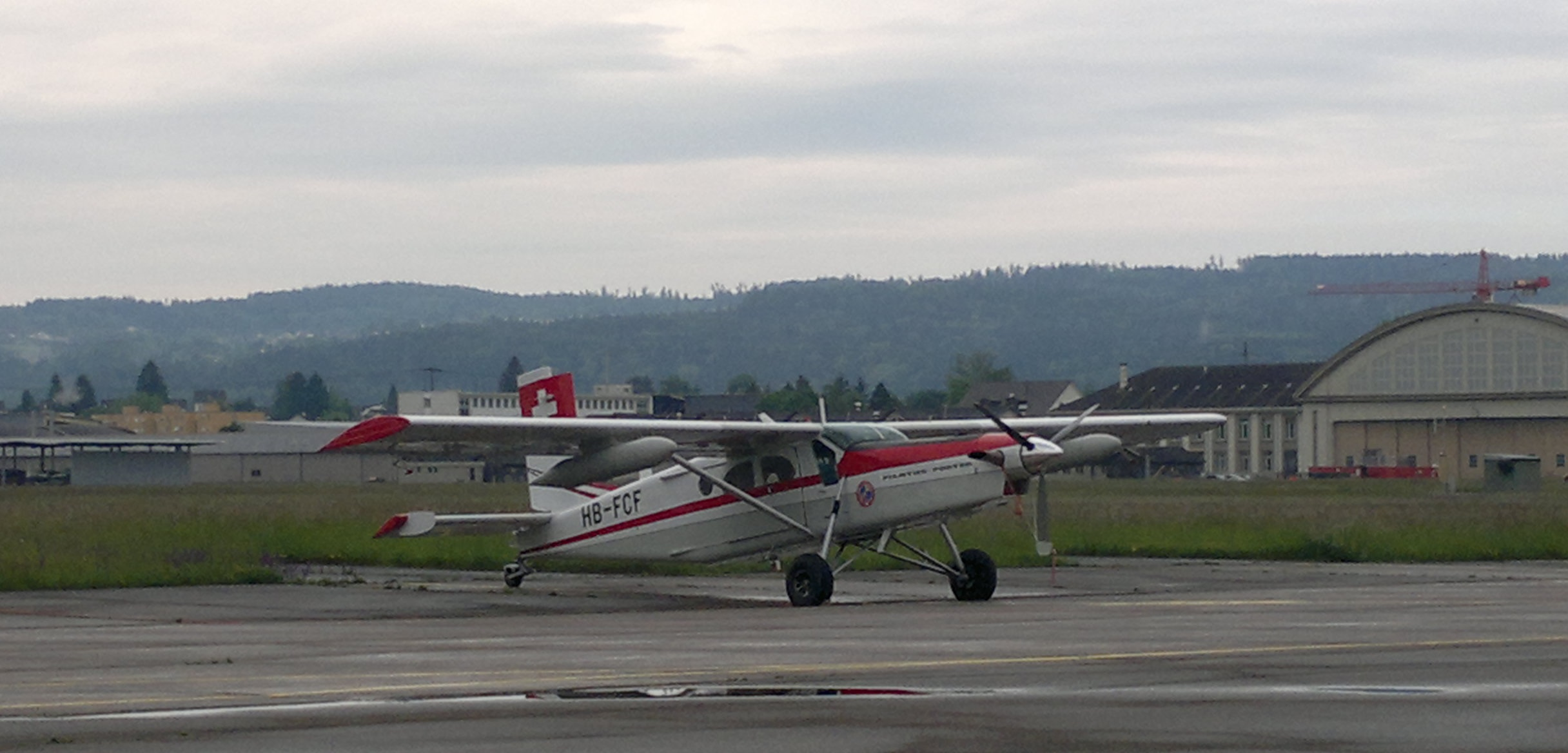
Armasuisse PC-6T at Dübendorf Air Base

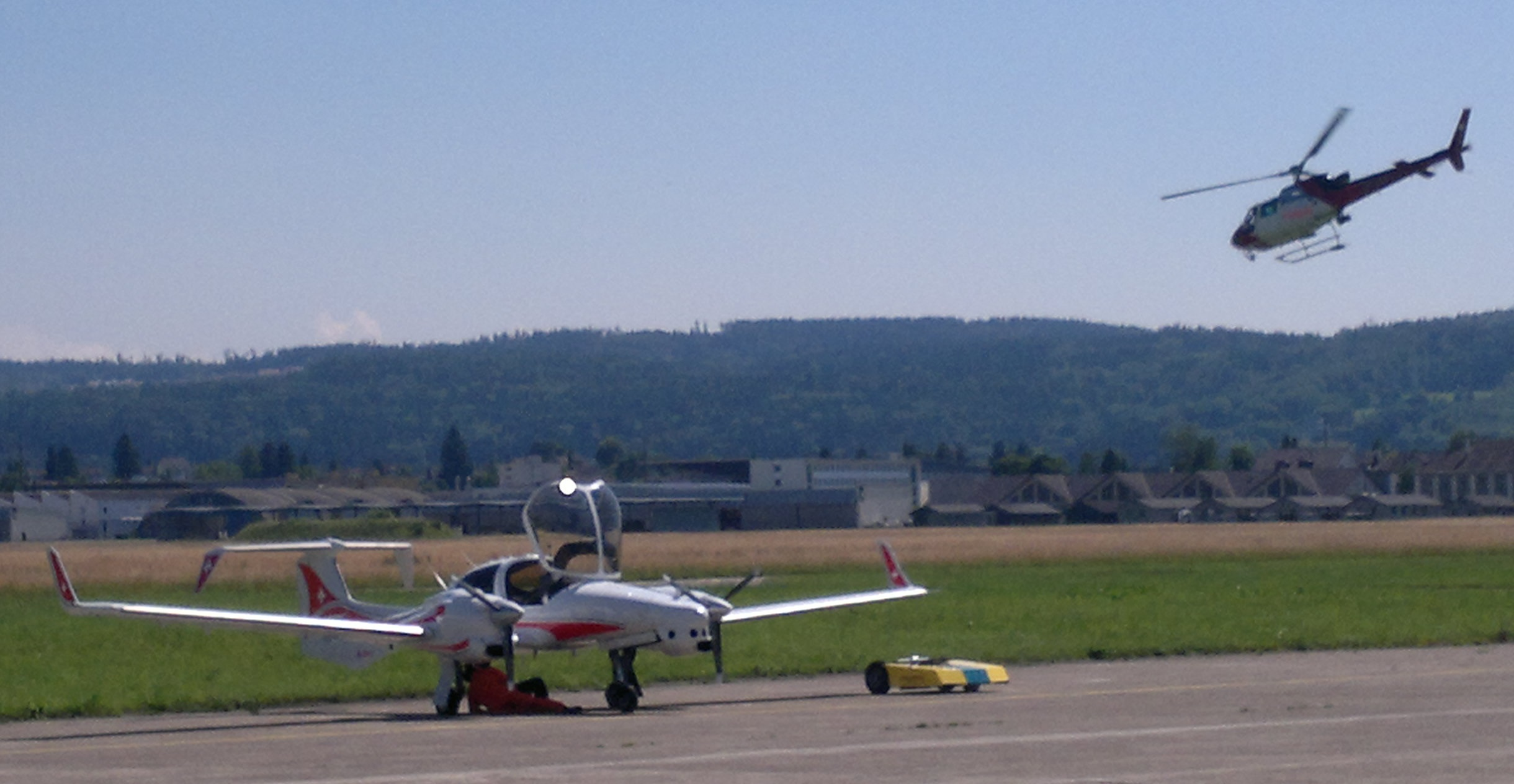
Armasuisse Diamond OPA Centauer DA42

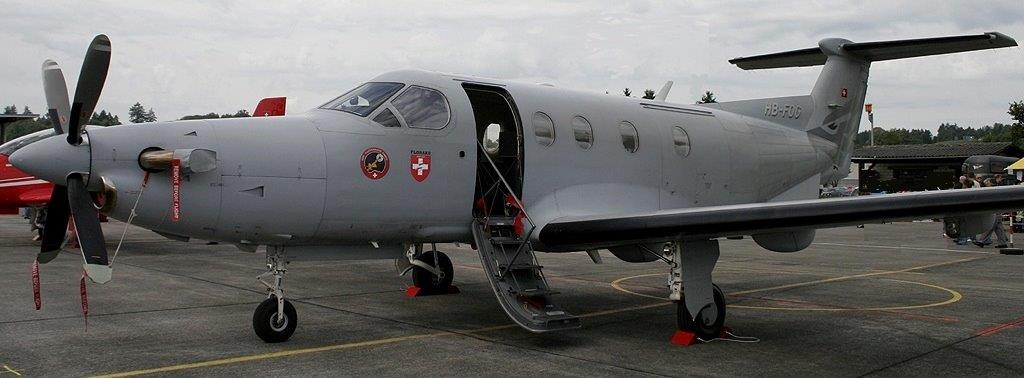
Armasuisse Pilatus PC-12

From the group for Armor Services (GRD) the flight test branch Emmen became the aviation branch of Armasuisse. The Pilatus PC-6 and PC-12 wear an emblem with a fictional experimental aircraft before Mount Pilatus. The Armasuisse regularly conducts test flights for the Swiss Air Force. The test pilots of Armasuisse are military pilots and all aircraft of the Air Force may be used by the Armasuisse. An F/A-18C is normally assigned to the Armasuisse for tasks such as certification of a new version of the AIM-9 missile, but this airplane is also used for normal Air Force duties. In addition, the Armasuisse has 3 permanently assigned aircraft which the Air Force uses when required:

A Pilatus PC-6 Porter with a more modern cockpit than that of the PC-6T of the Air Force. This machine is used as liaison aircraft. The Pilatus PC-12 is used for transport and calibrates the FLORAKO radar system, the Multifunctional Information Distribution System (MIDS) Link 16 and aircraft radio systems. The Diamond DA42 Centaur OPA is flown both manned, or unmanned as a UAV. The Centaur system is produced by Aurora Flight Sciences of the USA, starting with a basic DA42 from Diamond Aircraft. The Centaur system is used to conduct experiments and test flights on integrating UAVs with manned military and civil aircraft operations. In addition, this airplane is also used for liaison flights.

Bernhard Berset is the Chief Testpilot at Armasuisse. The homebase of the Armasuisse aircraft is Emmen Air Base.

== Full-time positions since 2001 ==
Raw data

"Federal Finance Administration FFA: State financial statements".
"Federal Finance Administration FFA: Data portal".
