= Fliegerstaffel 24 =

Fliegerstaffel 24 24ème Escadrille Squadriglia d'aviazione 24
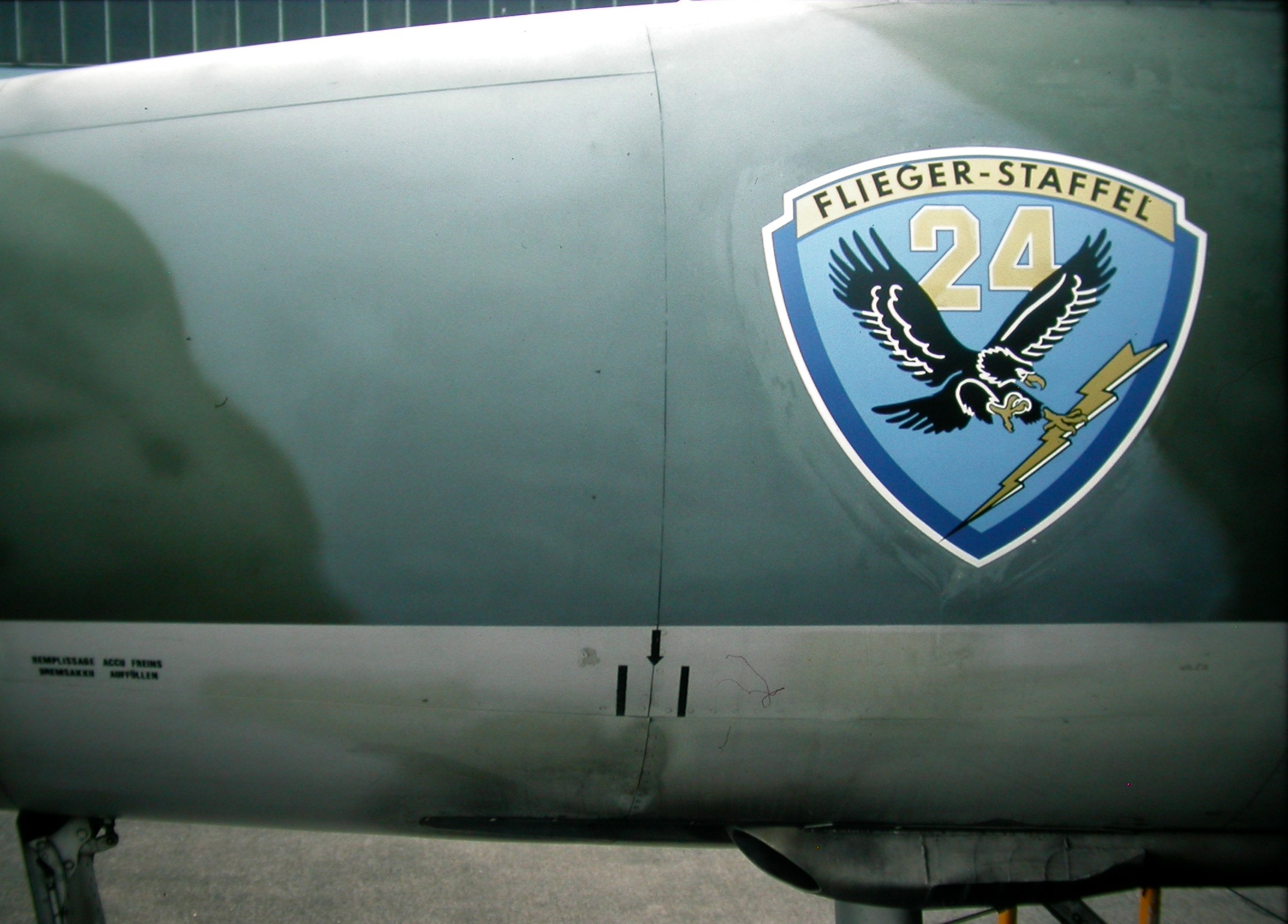
- Emblem of the Fliegerstaffel 24 on a Hunter double-seater in 1994
- Active: WW2-today
- Country: Switzerland
- Branch: Swiss Air Force
- Role: ECM squadron
- Garrison/HQ: Militärflugplatz Emmen

The Fliegerstaffel 24 fighter squadron 24 of the Swiss Air Force was a former standalone squadron, which is now the ECM (German:EKF) part of the Zielflugstaffel 12. It is a militia squadron and belongs to the airfield command 7. Its home base is the Militärflugplatz Emmen. The Fliegerstaffel 24 carries as coat of arms an eagle in front of a light blue background, holding a lightning bolt (flash as a symbol for the EKF) in the right claw, in the background is a red-orange number 24 and above the coat of arms is a red-orange area with the black writing "Fliegerstaffel".

== History ==
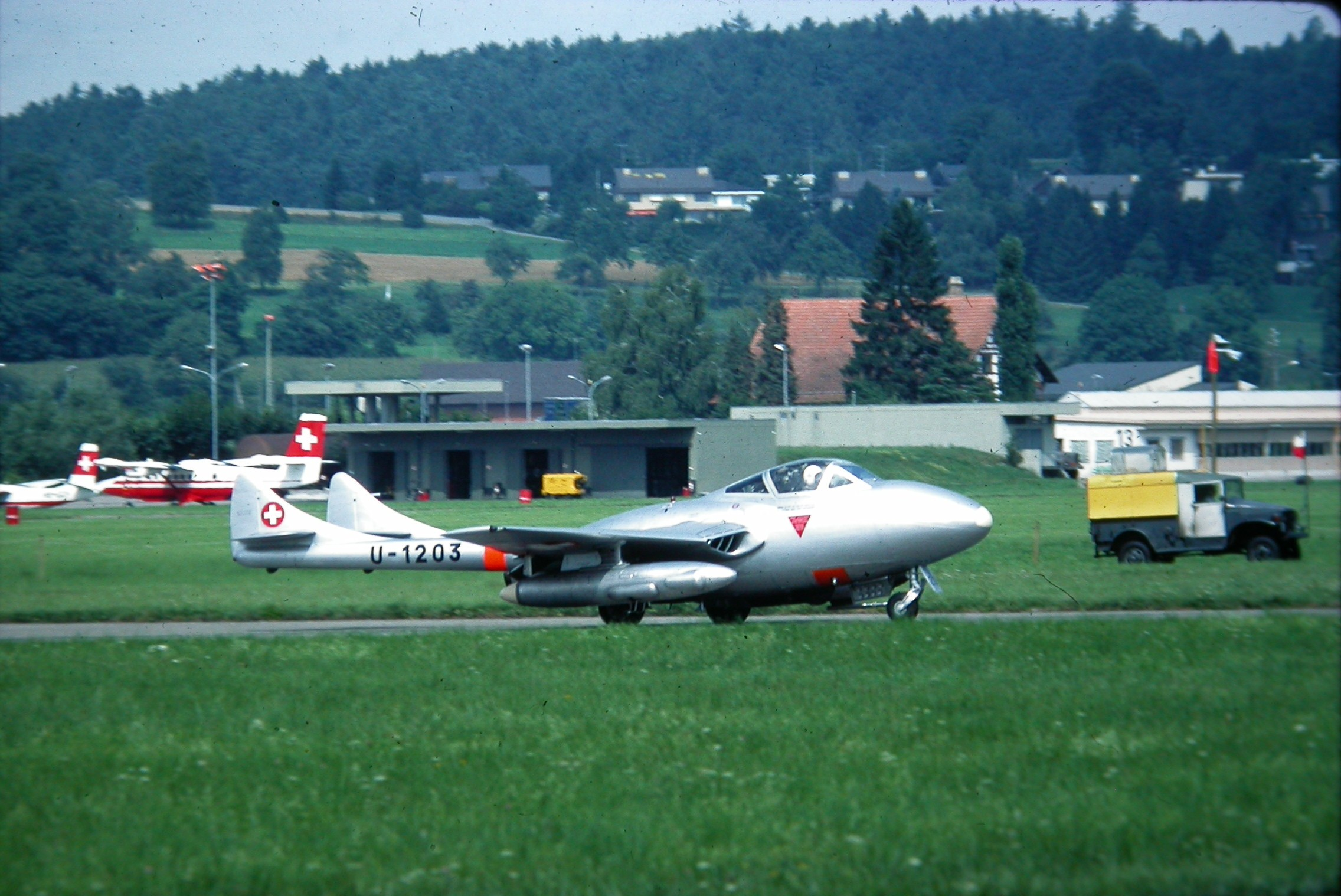
After 1974, U-1203 was modified to an aircraft for electronic warfare.

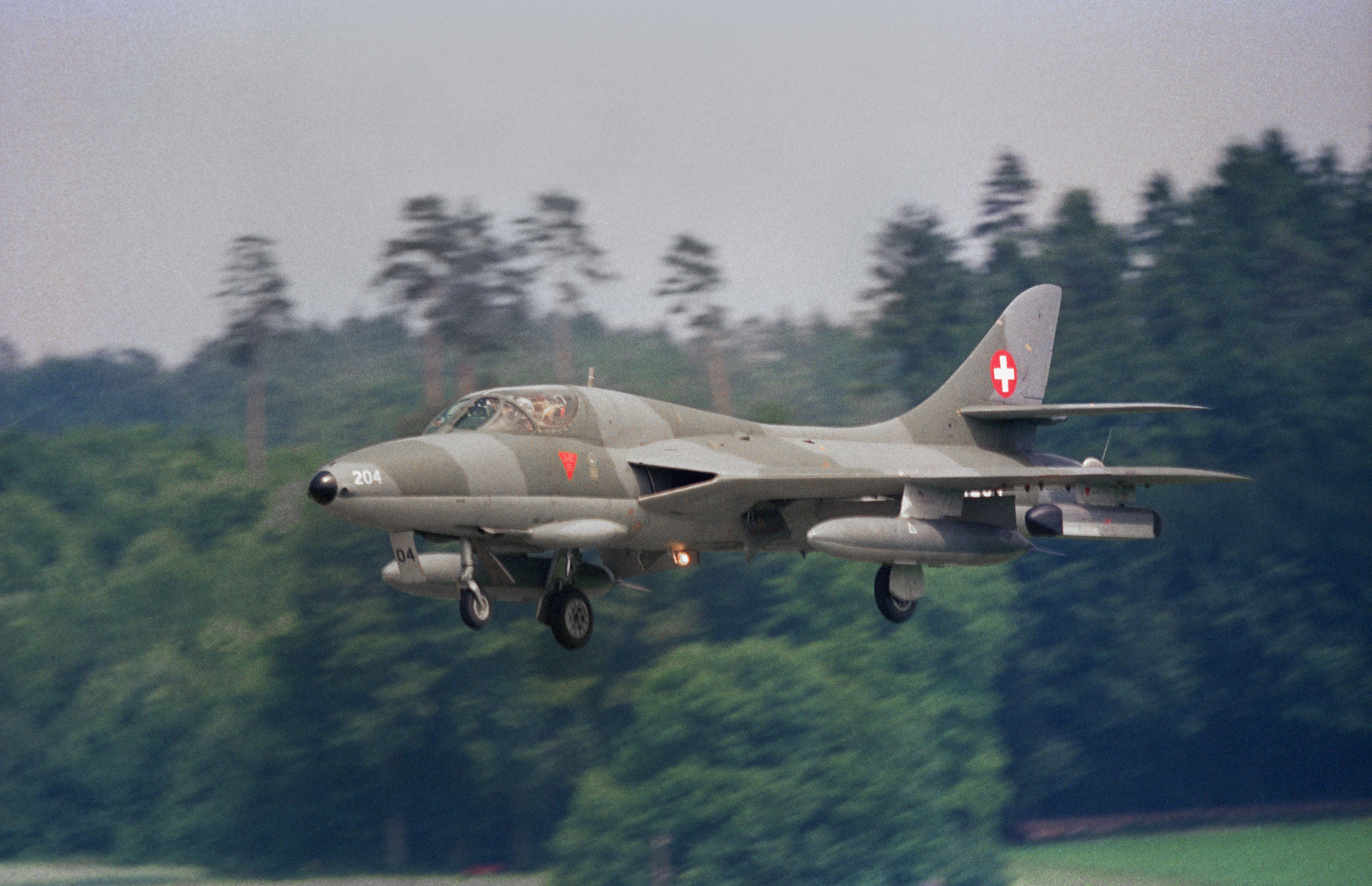
J-4204 lands in Dübendorf after an EKF mission

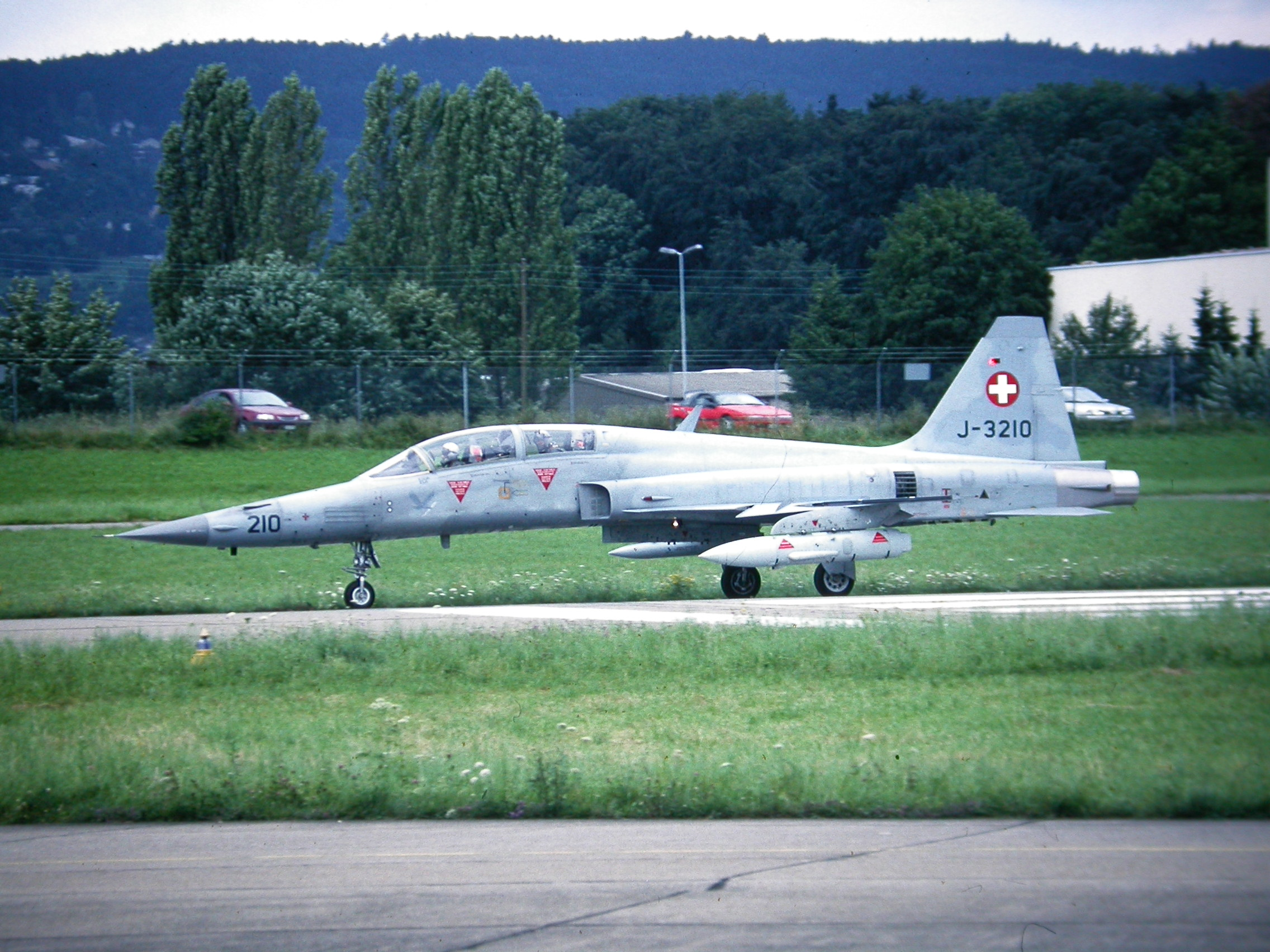
A F-5F in EKF use with the Vista5 jamming transmitter.The plane is also equipped with a low visibility squadron badge of the Fliegerstaffel 24

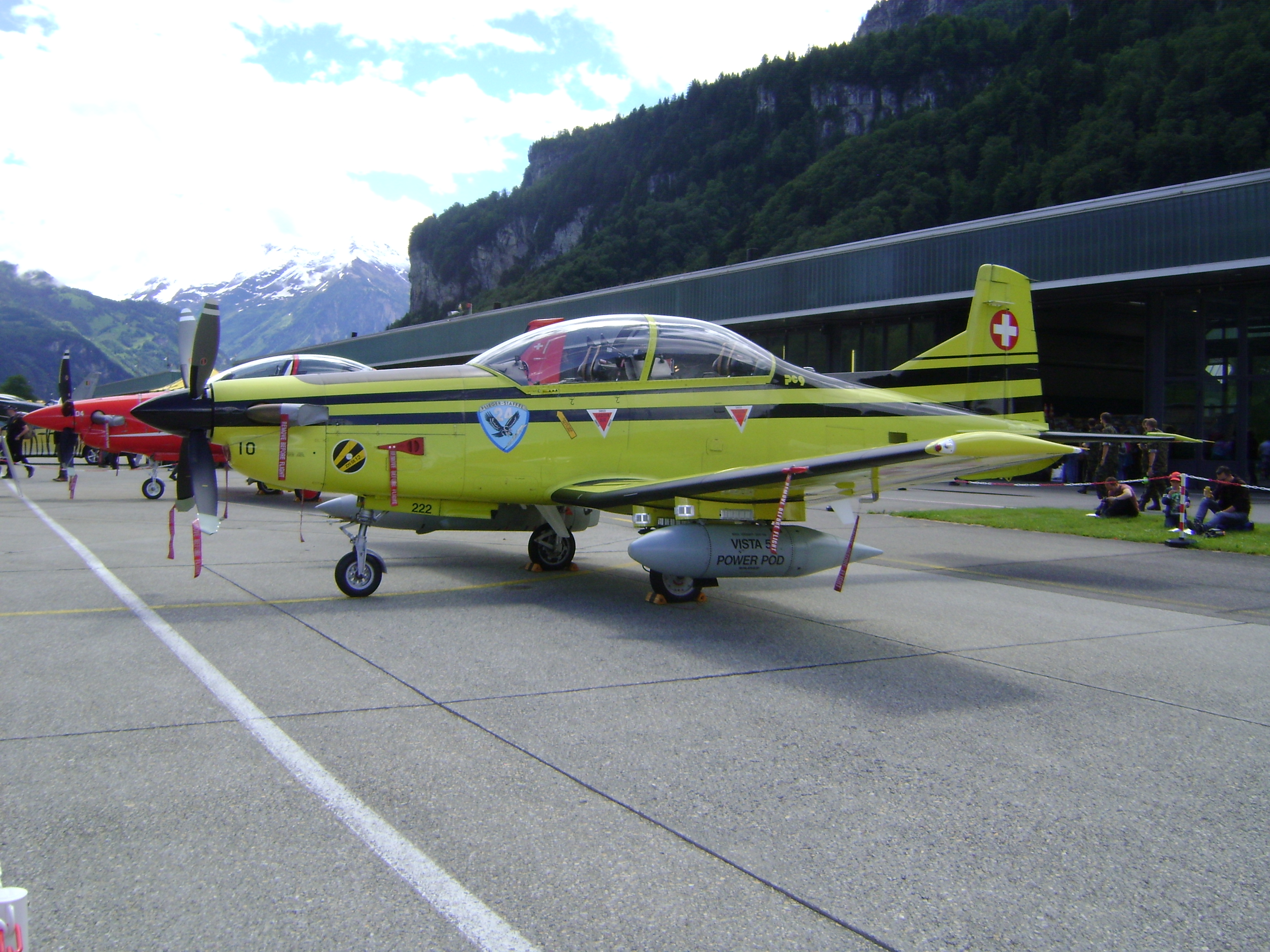
Pilatus PC-9 C-410 with Vista5 jamming transmitter; The plane carries both badges of the Fliegerstaffel 24 and Zielflugstaffel 12

Although the Fliegerstaffel 24 was integrated into the Zielflugstaffel 12 in 1994, it is so different in operation that it can still be regarded as an independent squadron. The Fliegerstaffel 24 was founded in the Second World War, but without taking action: The Swiss Air Force had 21 fighter squadrons and the Fliegerstaffel 24 was supposed to make the Swiss Air Force looking bigger than she was. - the Fliegerstaffel 22 and Fliegerstaffel 23 never existed.

By 1974 the double control had been removed in two Vampire trainers (J-1205, J-1203) and the aircraft had been upgraded with an operator seat for EKF purposes. In 1977 it was decided to use the Hunter trainers also for the electronic warfare (EKF) and to form the crews in Fliegerstaffel 24. Also in the Hunter trainers an operator was needed to operate the EKF equipment. Hunter trainers were used from 1977 to 1994 for the Fliegerstaffel 24, the aircraft were also used by other (Hawker Hunter) squadrons for conventional pilot training. This is also the case with the F-5F and PC-9 aircraft of the Fliegerstaffel 24. The home base for the Fliegerstaffel 24 was Sion Airport from 1979 to 1980, and then the Militärflugplatz Emmen and Payerne Air Base. Since 1994 is the military airfield Emmen the only homebase of the Fliegerstaffel 24. In 1994 the Fliegerstaffel 24 was integrated into the Zielflugstaffel 12. In the year 1987, the Fliegerstaffel 24 together with the Zielflugstaffel 12 received a total of 12 Pilatus PC-9, today 8 PC-9 are still in use. From 1987 to 2006 the Fliegerstaffel 24 also used one of the two Swiss Air Force's Learjet 35 for EKF tasks. In 1994, the Hunter trainers passed out of the Swiss Air Force, and the Fliegerstaffel 24 instead used some (J-3201, J-3210, J-3211 and J-3212) of the 12 F-5F Tigers. The pilots of the Fliegerstaffel 24 are former militia pilots of the Fliegerstaffel 6, 8 and 19, which have reached the age limits on the combat aircraft. The board operators of the Vista 5 system are professional boardopertors and belong to the Berufsfliegerkorps. The main task is to interfere with the radar equipment of combat aircraft (F/A-18 and F-5), the Skyguard, Rapier. The STINGER Alert-Radar and the radarsystems TAFLIR and FLORAKO. The Fliegerstaffel 24 shares the PC-9 with the Zielflugstaffel 12, which is use it as a target tug. The future of the Zielflugstaffel 12 and Fliegerstaffel 24is uncertain. This is because, on the one hand, the F-5F are scheduled to be phased out in 2018, and it was planned to remove the PC-9 at the end of 2016. However, four PC-9 are to continue to fly until 2025. Of these two machines (C-907 and C-908) are still intended as target tugs and the other two (C-911 and C-912) as radar jammers. Vista-5 "(electronic jammer as an additional container) has reached the end of its service life by 2018. A replacement for the Vista-5 is not provided, because modern combat aircraft have an integrated jammer with comparable performance, which no longer needs an on-board operator.

== Aircraft ==
- D.H.115 T.Mk.55
- Hawker Hunter Trainer
- Learjet 35
- Pilatus PC-9
- Northrop F-5F
