= LGR-1 Radar =

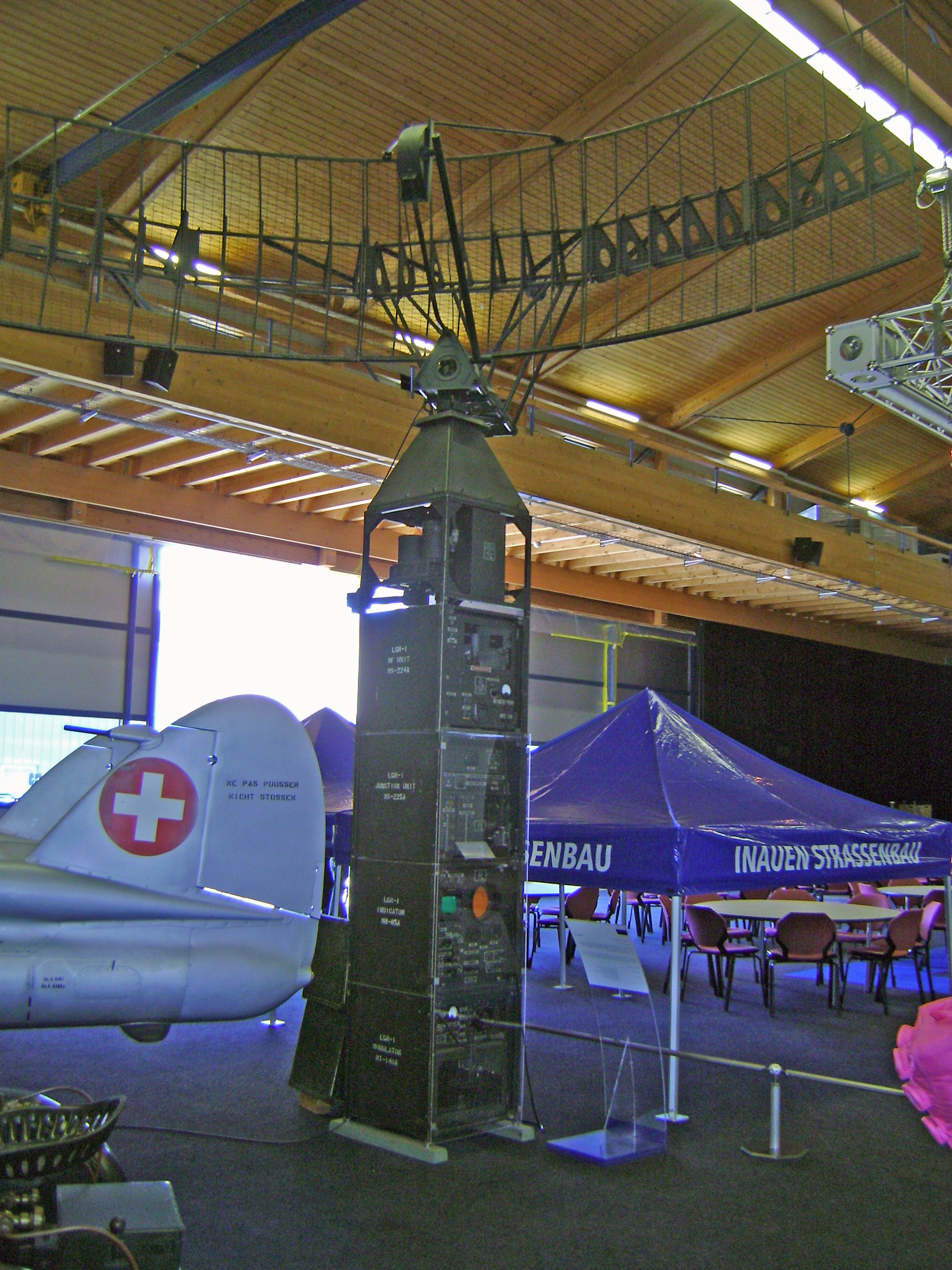
LGR-1 Radar at the Fliegermuseum Dübendorf

The LGR-1 (Lightweight Ground Radar 1) was used by Swiss Air Force from 1948 until 1955 for positioning the planned radar air surveillance system. It is now in the Flieger-Flab-Museum at Dübendorf.

== History ==
This radar of the first generation of mobile radar systems in World War II was in the Allied invasion of Normandy in use. In Switzerland, the system was never used in the tactical way. It was used for determining the locations of the first Swiss airspace control system the SRF Airspace monitoring and management system. The LGR-1 radar was tested at various locations, including at the military airfield Dübendorf, at the Bütschelegg above Bern-Belp, at the Weisfluhgipfel (Weissfluhjoch) and at the Creux du Van. As weatherprotection a wooden hut was built around the LGR-1. The transportable in 10 loads lightweight radar LGR-1 was developed during the Second World War by Bell Labs and Western Electric and built by Bendix Corporation in large numbers.

== Specifications ==
- Transmitter: L-band in the frequency range 1220 - 1350 MHz
- Peak power: 400 kW
- Pulse duration: 0.2 microsecond
- Target detection range: 100 km
- Power supply: 120 Volt 400 Hz from a gasoline engine.

== See also ==
- SRF Airspace monitoring and management system
- Target allocation radar TPS-1E
- FLORIDA Airspace monitoring and management system
- TAFLIR
- FLORAKO
