= Flieger Flab Museum =

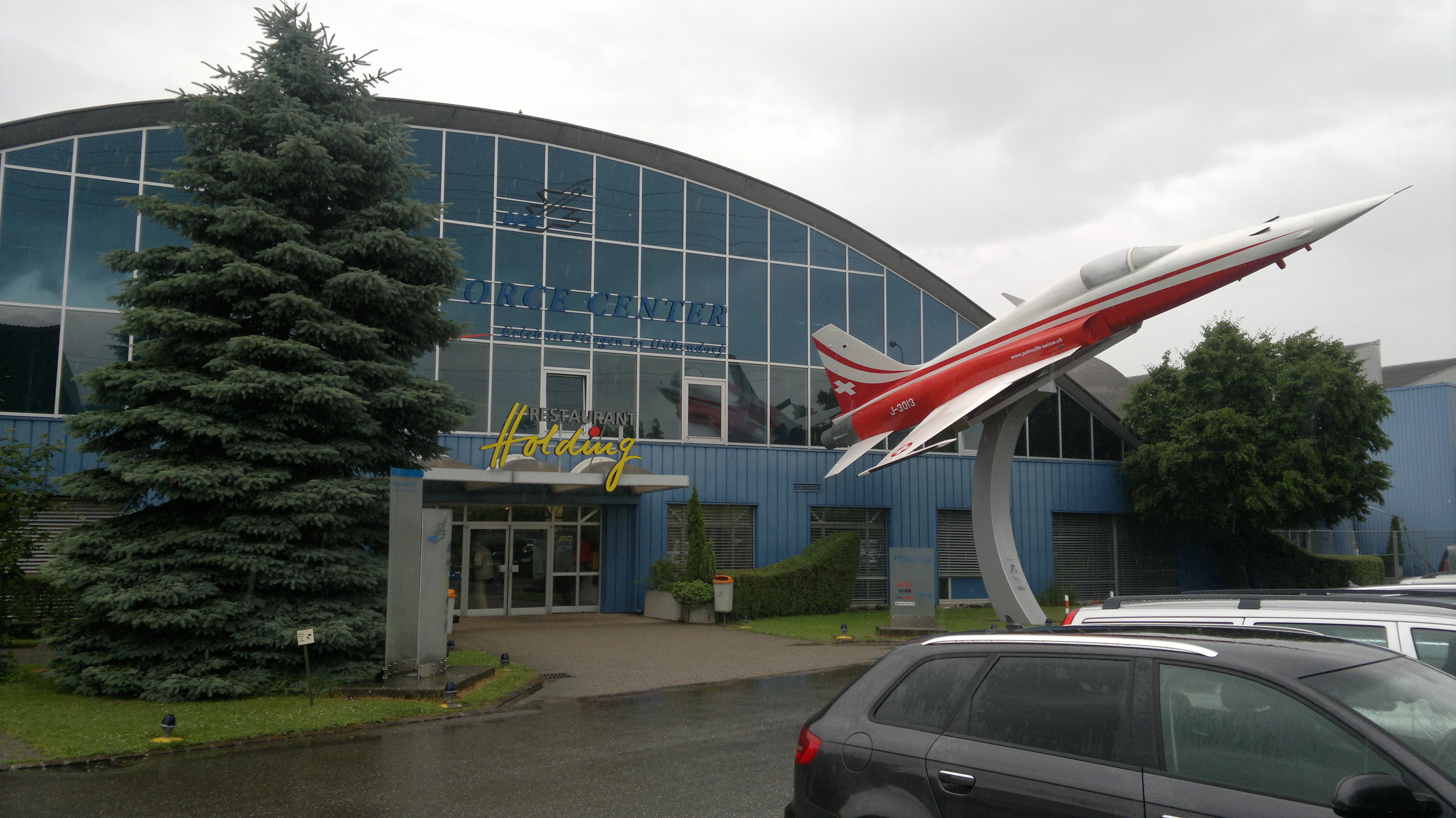
- Entrance Restaurant
- Established: 1978
- Location: Dübendorf, Switzerland
- Coordinates: 47°23′52″N 8°37′49″E
- Type: Aviation museum
- Website: Official website

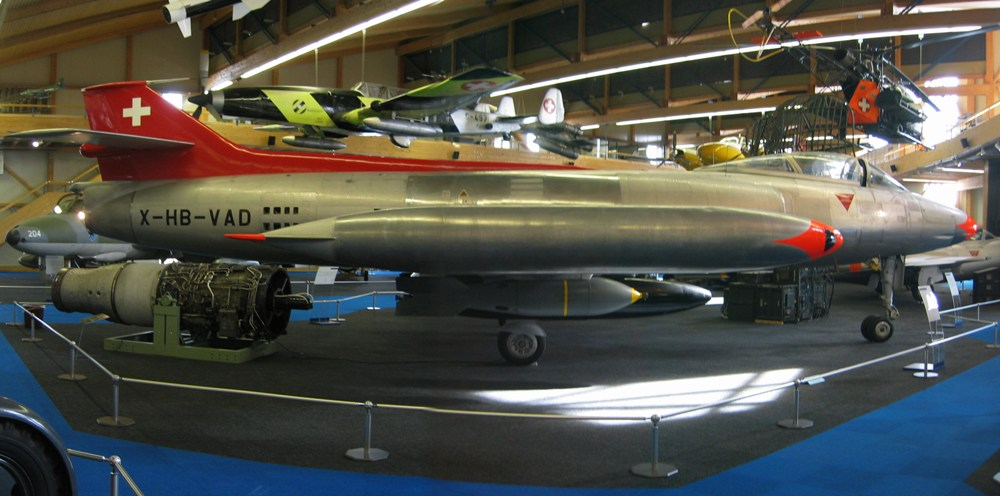
FFA P-16 Mk.III im Flieger Flab Museum Dübendorf

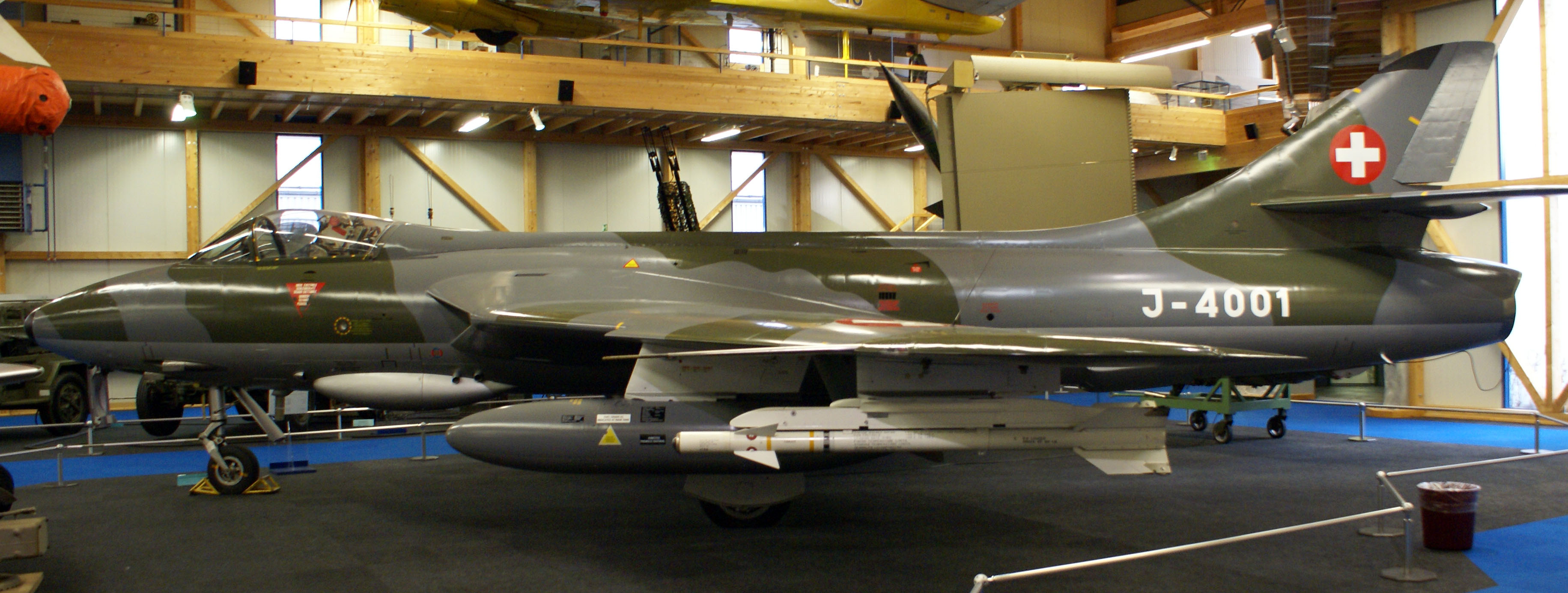
Hawker Hunter MK.58

The Flieger Flab Museum (English: Swiss Air Force Museum) is located in the Canton of Zurich in Dübendorf on the grounds of Dübendorf Air Base. In the museum, 40 airplanes and helicopters are displayed, with the collection divided into distinct eras: pioneers and World War I, the 1930s, World War II and the postwar period, the beginning of the jet age, the development of jet fighters, the Cold War, and arms reduction.

== History ==
=== Prehistory ===
For many years, decommissioned aircraft from the Air Force were scrapped due to lack of space, with only a few individual parts such as engines, instruments, weapons and propellers being kept. Parts of foreign aircraft that landed in Switzerland during the Second World War, especially engines, were also kept at various departments. However, entire aircraft were usually not preserved until 1965. During the Second World War, however, a depot was set up in Schadau Castle in which historical material was collected for a possible but never realized army museum. After the war, some of the material supplied by the directorate of the military airfields was returned to their operations, while other parts went to various armories. The hangar manager in Dübendorf tried to make room, and some of the engines also went to the Technorama association's collection in Oberwinterthur and to the mechanical engineering laboratory of the Swiss Federal Institute of Technology in Zurich.

In 1970, the Department of Military Airfields donated a portion of the material suitable for a civilian museum to the Transport Museum in Lucerne, as a contribution to the newly opened aviation hall there. Aircraft were also loaned to Lucerne. For this occasion, the then director of the Federal Office of Military Airfields, Hans Giger, decided to bring together the material that was scattered across many locations and had a World War I hangar at Dübendorf airfield that was used by the grounds service cleared in order to store the existing material. This hangar 13 was the scene of a first internal tour in 1972. The actual collection was built up between 1972 and 1978 by employees of the Office of Military Airfields and its director from 1969 to 1979, Hans Giger. After some difficulties, the engines from the Lyss Armory, as well as others from the Technorama, were returned to Dübendorf. The second of the three World War I hangars, Hangar 14, was now also occupied. During these years there were occasional guided tours.

=== Opening of a public museum ===
After repeatedly failing to find support from his superiors, Giger bypassed the official channels and turned directly to the head of the Federal Military Department, Federal Councillor Rudolf Gnägi. Gnägi spontaneously agreed on the condition that he would work voluntarily to run the museum and that the proceeds would be paid into the federal treasury. The exhibition was open to the public for a summer from 9 June 1978. One year after the first opening, the old, leaky hangars were made suitable for use as museums and accessible again. Another hangar (number 11) was added, as was the large radome that had served on the Wangen side near the airfield.

Edgar Oehler and Hans Giger, who was about to retire, persuaded the owner of the Altenrhein aircraft and vehicle works, Claudio Caroni, to agree to give the museum a prototype of the Swiss home-built P-16 jet aircraft. Because the second example did not make it to the Swiss Museum of Transport as planned, the aircraft handed over in Dübendorf on 8 August 1980 remains the only surviving aircraft of the type. Even after his retirement, Hans Giger continued to work on replicas of historic aircraft on a private basis; he recruited other retired employees of the military airfield department in Interlaken and Buochs to work on such replicas. Depending on the source, replicas were produced in between 45,500 and 60,000 hours of work, up until the time when parts of the workshops were closed in 1998, when the average age of the employees building the DH-1 replica had reached 84 years. As early as 2001, there were fears that the DH-3 aircraft project would not be completed, although later there was still hope that it would be completed.

In 1978, for the first time, the public were able to contribute to the collection, which grew steadily over the next few years. Finally, in 1979, the Friends of the Museum of the Swiss air force (VFMF) was formed, initiated by Hans Giger, the Director of the Federal Office for military airfields. In order to be able to continue operations independently of the federal government, Giger suggested the establishment of a private sponsoring association, which was founded in 1979 as the Association of Friends of the Swiss Air Force Museum (VFMF).

During the VFMF presidency of former Federal Councillor Rudolf Friedrich from 1985 to 1988, the association built a new exhibition hall with the help of donations. This extension, a concrete shell structure by the engineer Heinz Isler, was inaugurated in 1988 by the then Federal Councillor Arnold Koller. The items on loan from the Lucerne Museum of Transport and other stored aircraft now found space in the museum. A year earlier, the federal government had assumed financial responsibility for the operation of the museum. Ten years later (1997), the VFMF and the Association of Friends of the Flab (VF-Flab) merged to form the Association of Friends of the Swiss Air Force VFL. In 2002, a second hall was opened on the site of the small old First World War hangars.

During the presidency of former Federal Councillor Rudolf Heinrich Friedrich between 1985 and 1988, the club built a new exhibition hall with the help of donations. This extension, a concrete-shell structure designed by engineer Heinz Isler, was inaugurated in 1988 by former Federal Councillor Arnold Koller. A year earlier, the federal government took over the financial responsibility for the operation of the museum. Ten years later, in 1997, the VFMF and the Association of Friends of flab (VF-flab) merged with the Friends of the Swiss Air Force AFL. In 2002, a new hall was opened.

== Exhibits ==
=== Aircraft ===
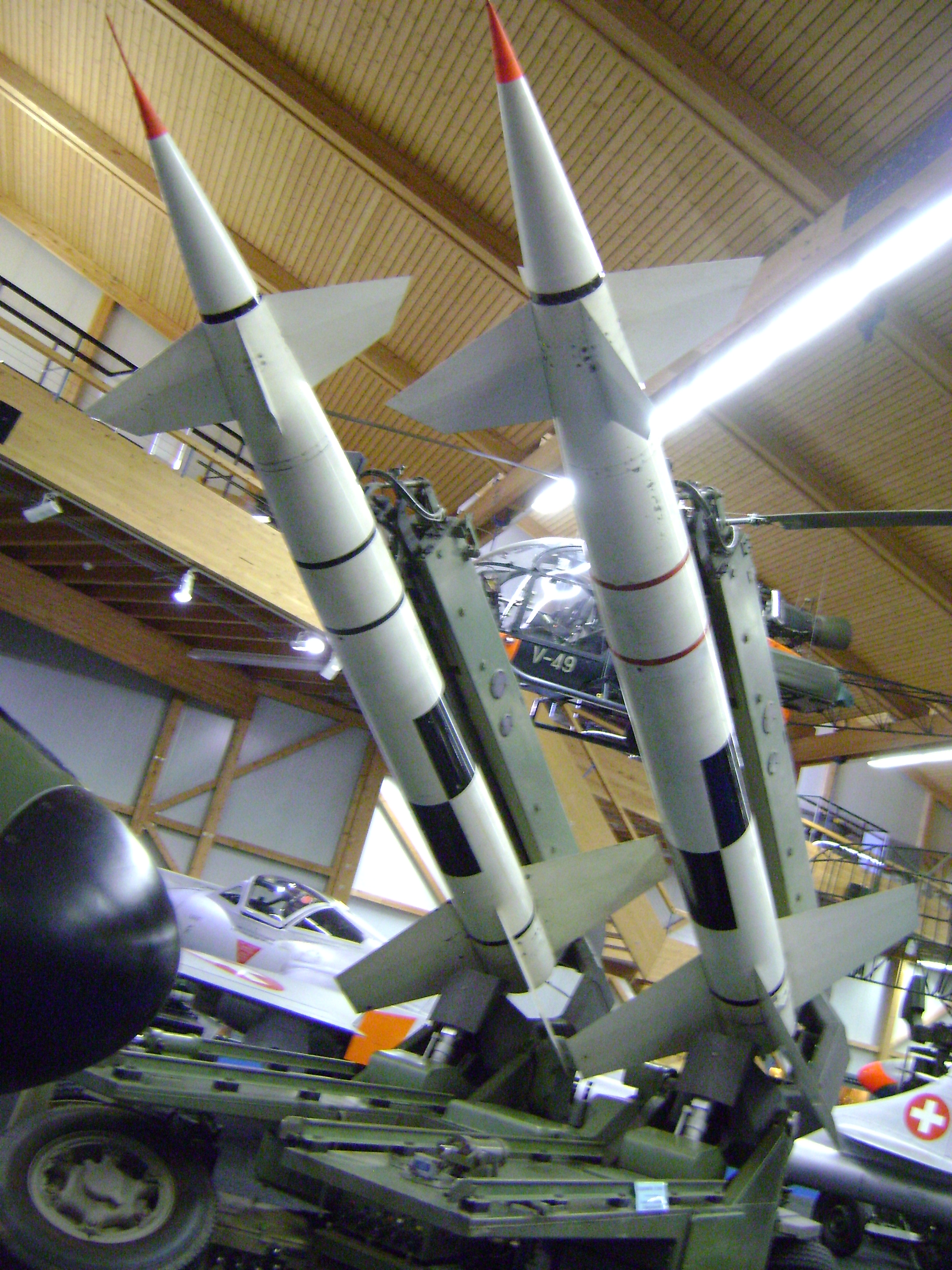
Launcher with 2 Oerlikon RSE Kriens Lenkwaffen at Fliegermuseum Dübendorf

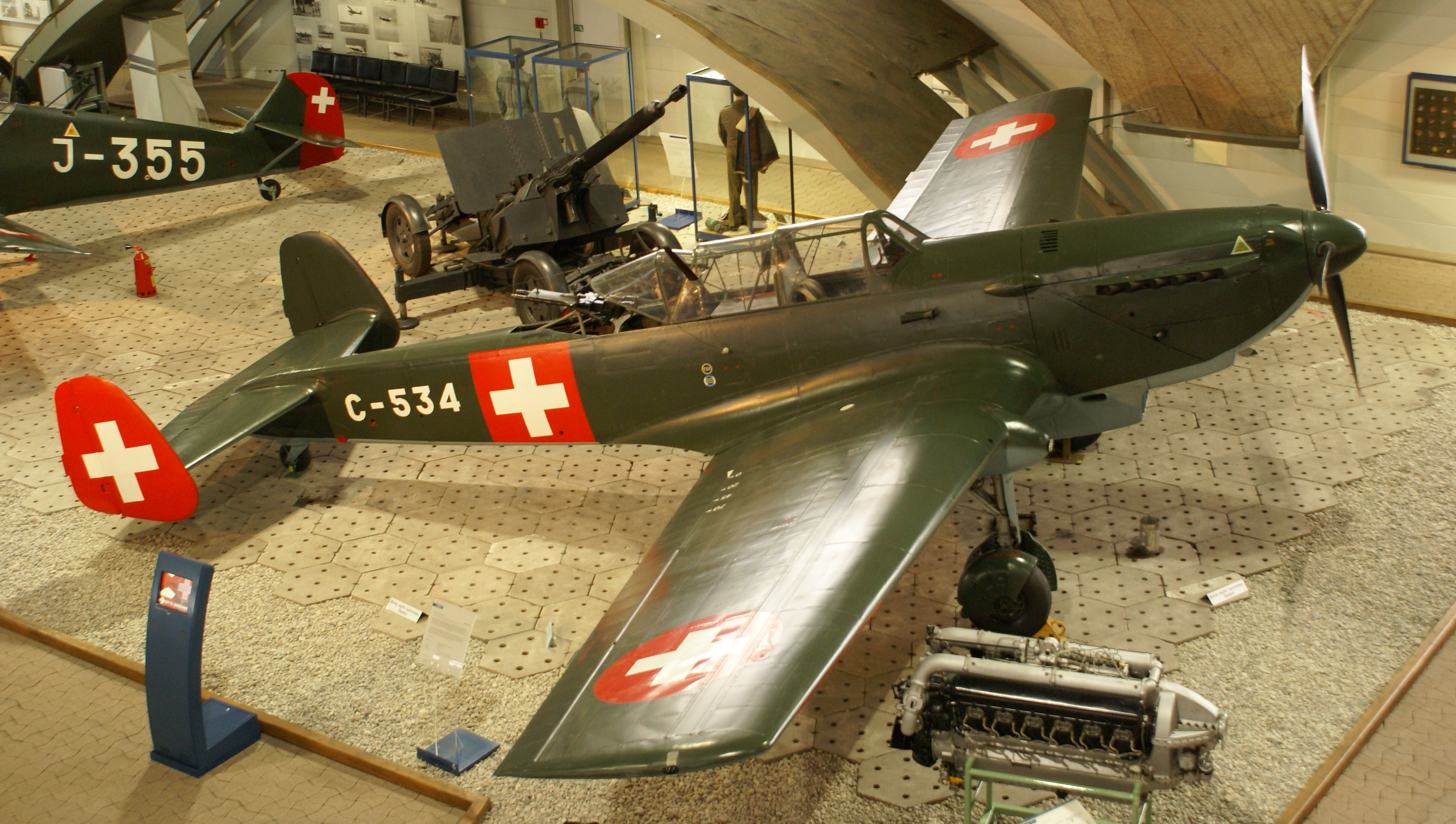
Swiss Air Force C-3603-1

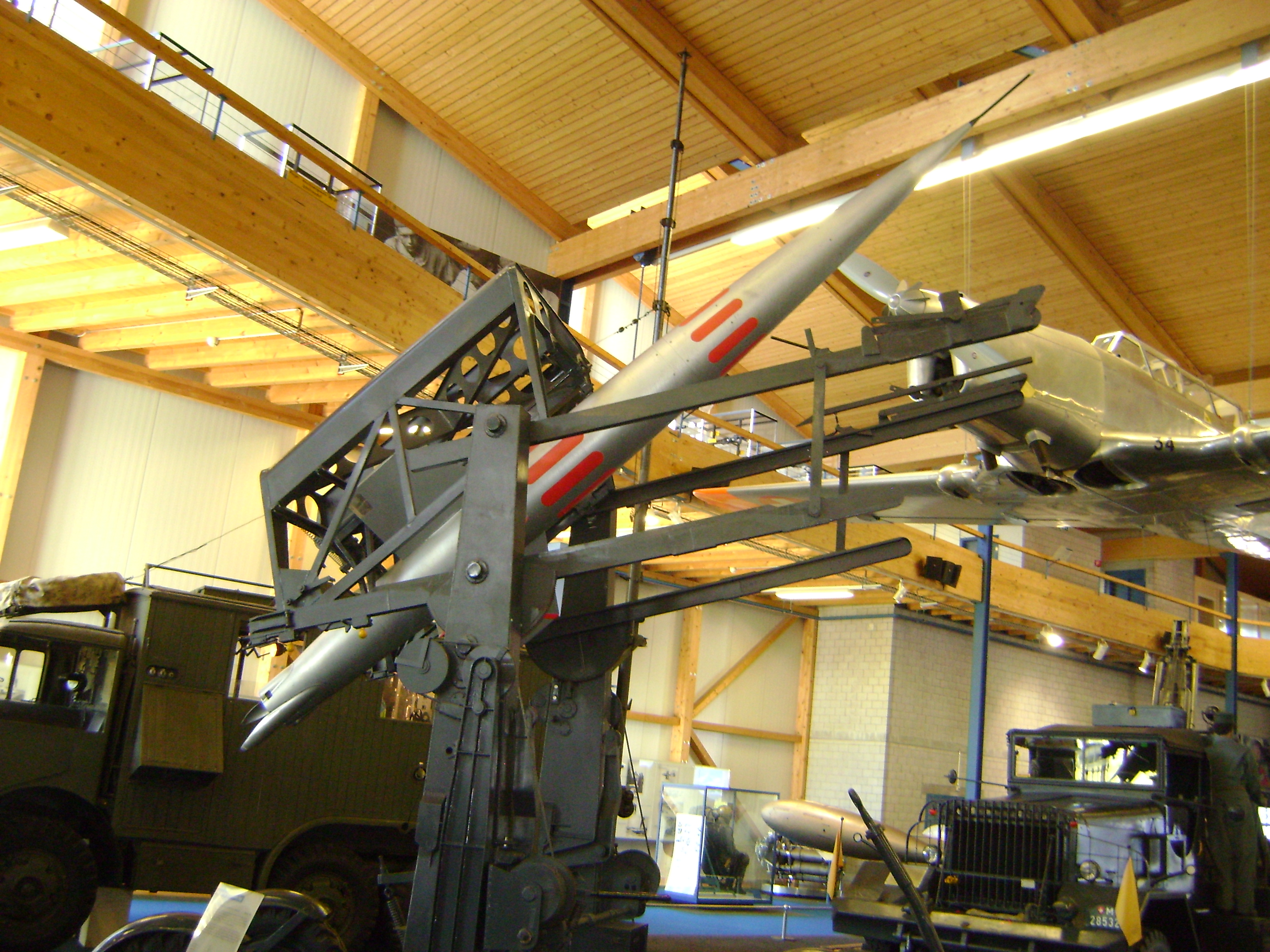
RSA Lenkwaffe in launcher

- ADS-95 Ranger
- Alouette II
- Alouette III
- BAe Hawk
- Bücker Bü 131
- Bücker Bü 181
- Blériot XI
- Dassault Mirage IIIS
- Dassault Mirage IIIRS
- De Havilland Vampire DH.100
- De Havilland Vampire DH.115 Trainer
- de Havilland Venom DH-112
- de Havilland Venom DH-112 reconnaissance version
- N-20.2 Arbalète
- N-20.10 Aiguillon
- EKW C-36 C-3603
- FFA P-16
- Fieseler Fi 156 Storch
- Hanriot HD.1
- Hawker Hunter F.Mk.58 and T.Mk.68
- Hiller UH-12B
- Messerschmitt Bf 109
- Messerschmitt Bf 108-B Taifun
- Morane-Saulnier D-3800
- North American P-51D Mustang
- Nieuport 28
- Northrop F-5E erected in front of museum in Patrouille Suisse paint
- Northrop F-5E in standard gray paint on loan from the Air Force
- Northrop F-5F in standard gray paint on loan from the Air Force
- Pilatus P-2
- Pilatus P-3
- Pilatus PC-7 Turbo trainer
- Pilatus PC-9
- Rockwell Grand Commander 680FL

=== Simulators ===
- Boeing 737-222 cockpit section
- Dassault Mirage IIIDS
- Dassault Mirage IIIS
- Pilatus P-3
- F/A-18C
- Boeing 747-338 cockpit section (May 2017)

== Other exhibits ==
- Bristol BL-64 Bloodhound
- Fire control radar Mark VII
- FLORIDA Airspace monitoring and management system
- Flt Gt63 /69' Super Fledermaus
- LGR-1 Radar
- Oerlikon 35 mm twin cannon
- Oerlikon 20 mm cannon
- RSA Missile
- RSE Kriens (Missile)
- Saurer M6 radio truck
- SRF Airspace monitoring and management system
- Target allocation radar TPS-1E

== See also ==
- List of museums in Switzerland
