= FLORIDA Airspace monitoring and management system =

Airspace monitoring and management system of the Swiss Air Force

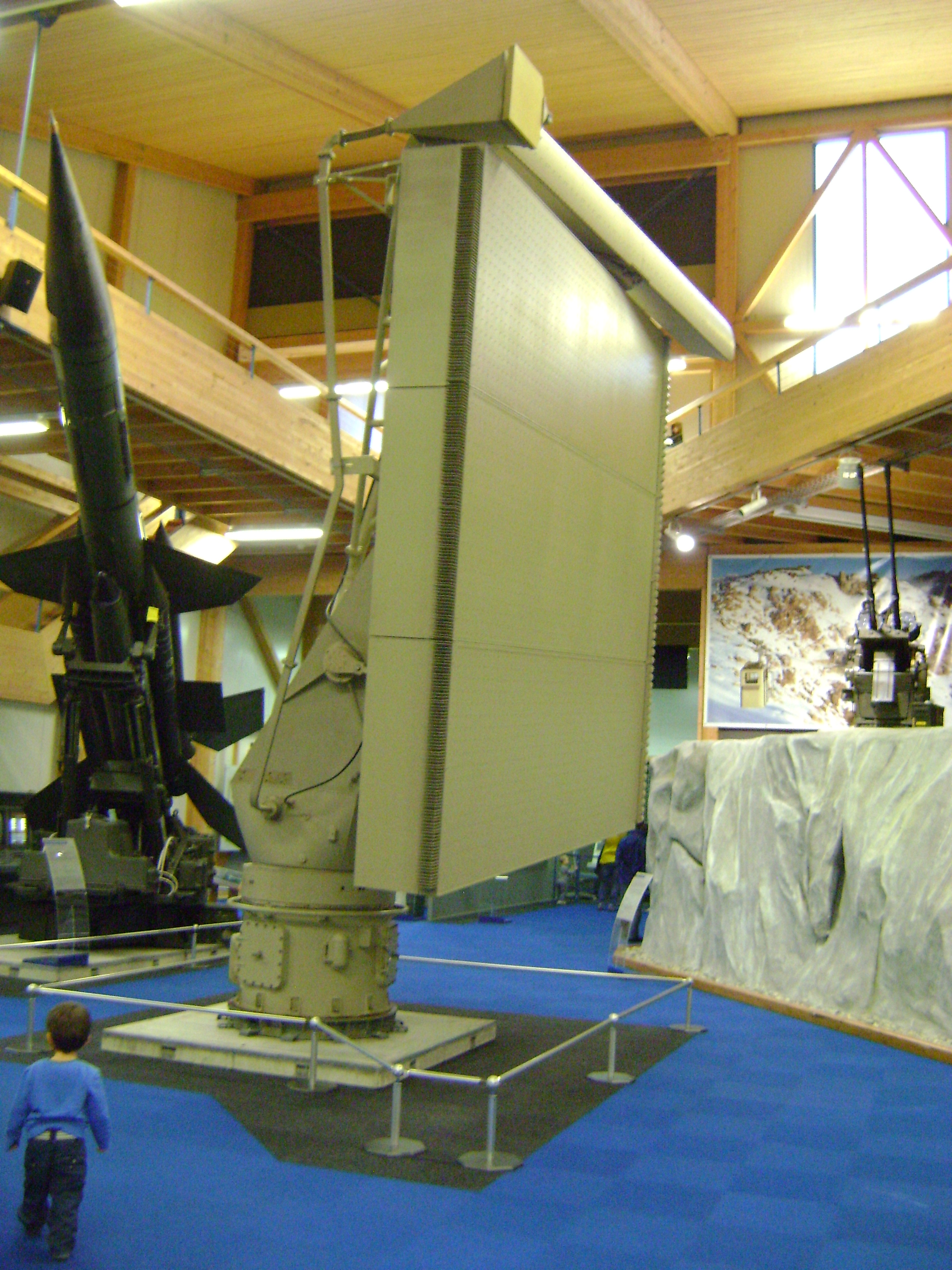
FLORIDA Radar antenna at Flieger-Flab-Museum Dübendorf

The FLORIDA Airspace Monitoring And Management System was an airspace monitoring and management system of the Swiss Air Force. It was built by the Hughes Aircraft Company in Fullerton, California.

== History ==
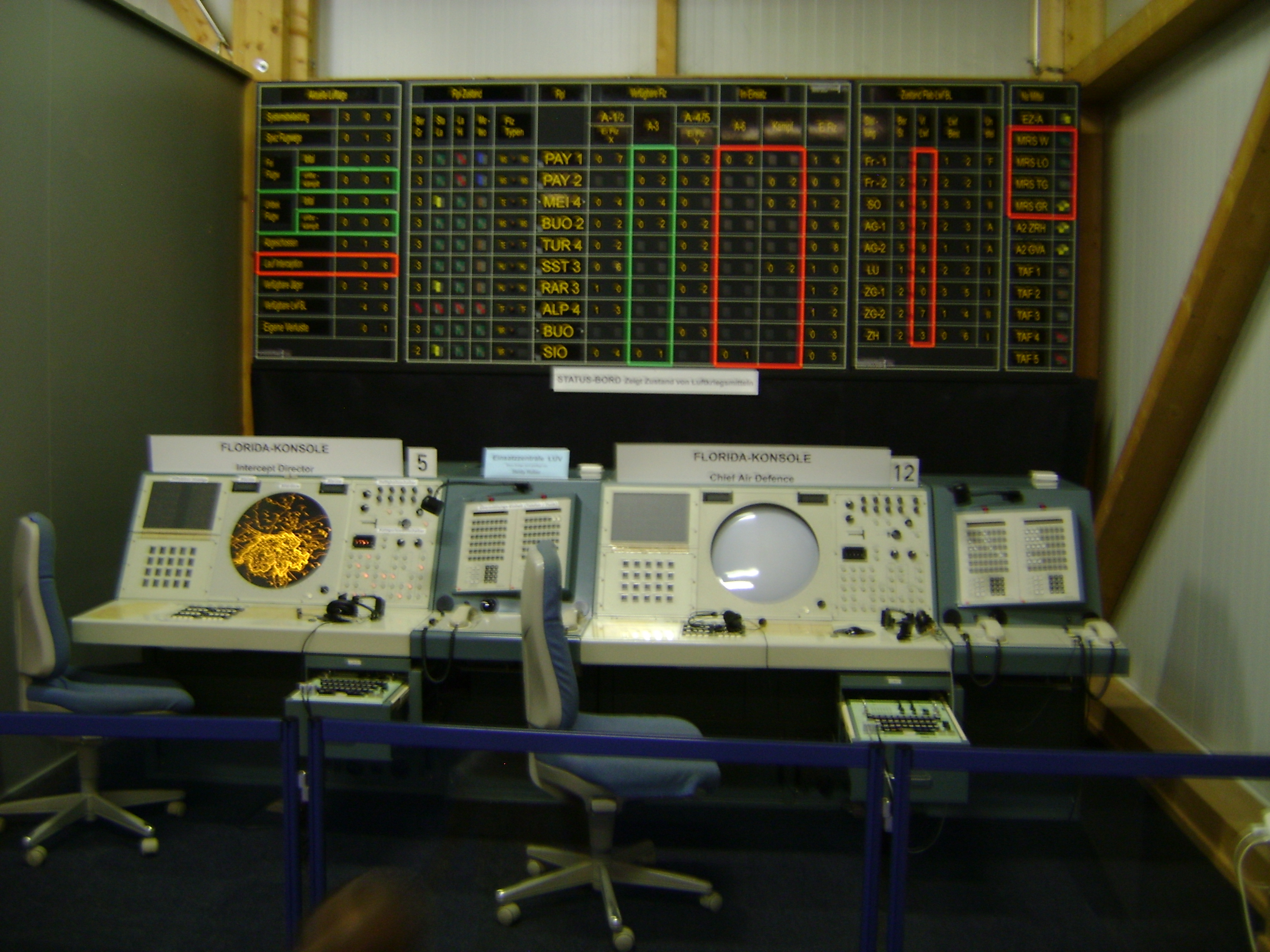
FLORIDA consoles at the Flieger-Flab-Museum Dübendorf

The system was put into operation in about 1970, replacing the previous SRF Airspace monitoring and management system. With the deployment of FLORIDA, continuous 24-hour/365-day air surveillance was possible. In contrast to the SRF system, the FLORIDA system was partially automated; it could identify radar data mostly by itself, and was able to calculate interception lines to a specific radar track.

The construction work, especially at Mount Pilatus, was visible to tourists.

The system's radar enhanced the prediction of meteorological conditions (strong winds and lightning) and military attacks.

By 2001 the system was nearing its end of its life. Requirements after the September 11 attacks increased, and the system's capacity of around 400 simultaneous objects could not keep up with increasing air traffic. The FLORIDA system was replaced in 2003 by FLORAKO.

== Technology ==
The FLORIDA system included three main components:

=== Radar systems ===
The four elevated rotating radar antennas each consisted of a primary radar, and a secondary radar mounted over the primary radar. They could be fully retracted into the mountain peak which was automatically closed with a massive door. The sites were equipped with anti-aircraft artillery in rotatable domes for self-defense.

=== Operational centers ===
Several wartime operational centers were located in mountain caverns. The operations center for peacetime use was sited at Dübendorf, adjacent to the surveillance squadron building. It is now used by the civilian Skyguide as a test center. The consoles were equipped with a trackball and allowed to edit each radar track quickly, when the system could not identify it. Each console had several displays showing the best interception path (the path was shown in several numbers who stood for height, speed,..) for the allocated intercept aircraft flying under the control of the tactical fighter controller (TFC) on this console. The TFC transmit by radio to the Aircraft by using the Bambini-Code (used in World War II by the Swiss Air Force-developed tactical code). Each operations center was equipped with a large status board which indicated the most important information of all the military airfields.

=== Computing center ===
The computer center consists primarily of the computing system with the corresponding peripheral devices (magnet tape, printer, punch cards and paper tape) and interface devices (interfaces) for communication with the local (on-screen consoles, status board, etc.) and external subsystems (redundant computing centers, radar stations, Bl-64 positions, direction finders, eg.). The computer can process data from up to 400 aircraft simultaneously.

== Tasks ==
- Formation of an adjusted, identified overall air situation based on the local air situation. Continuous updating
- Data communication across all integrated FLORIDA systems and with internal and external subsystems
- Provision of data to show the air situation on the consoles, and state of force readiness on the status board
- Computation of solutions for use of fighter aircraft, or missiles to attack an enemy aircraft at the request of the operator (air defense)
- Calculation and presentation of data management continuously updated according to the selected operating procedures
- Maintenance of operational software and the ability to test software and simulate selective air situations for personnel training (Swiss soldiers usually serve 2–4 weeks every year).

== Gallery ==
A FLORIDA radar antenna, statusboard, 2 consoles and a complete computer center are today in the Flieger-Flab-Museum at Dübendorf.

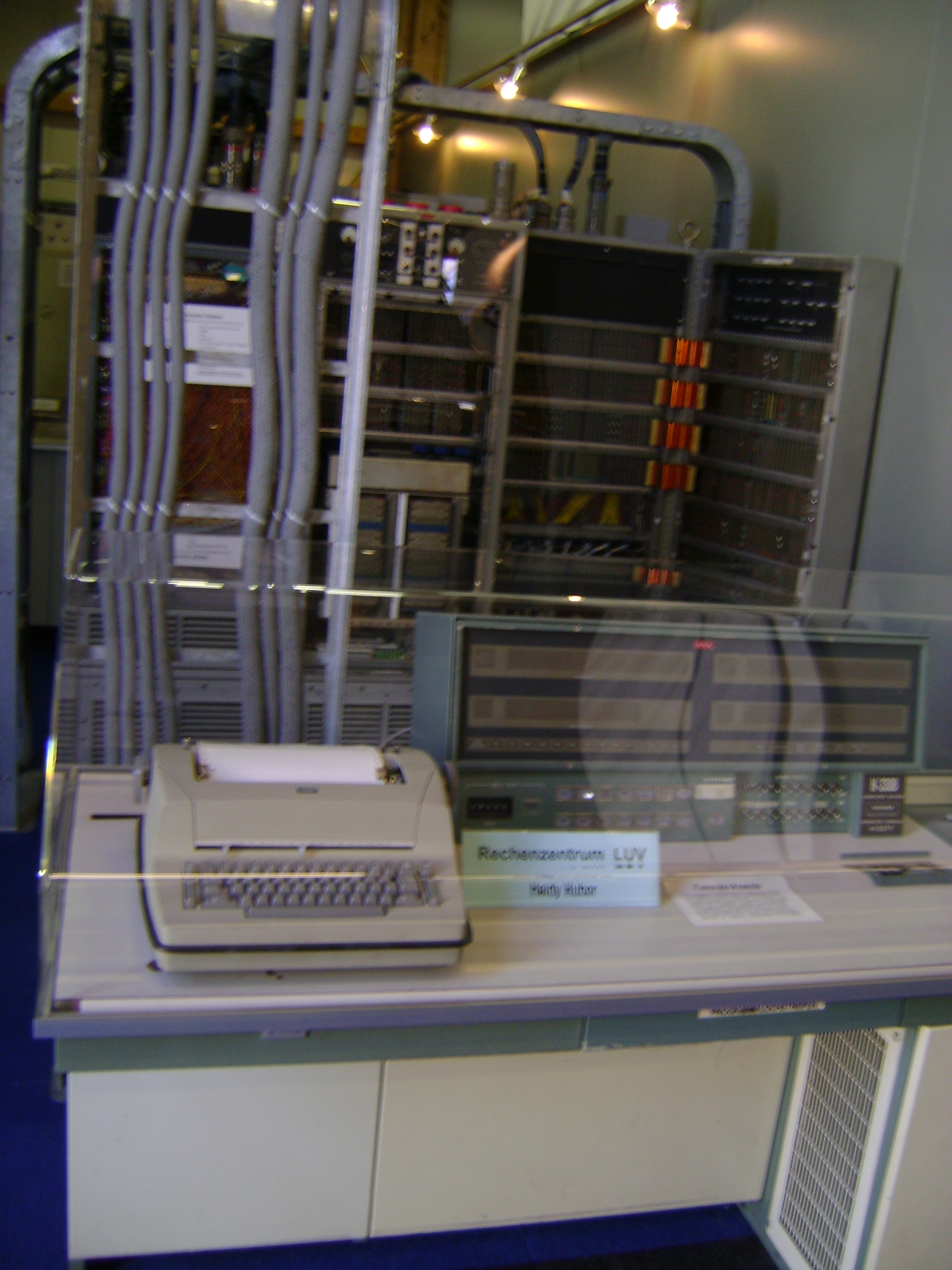
Input station of the FLORIDA computing center

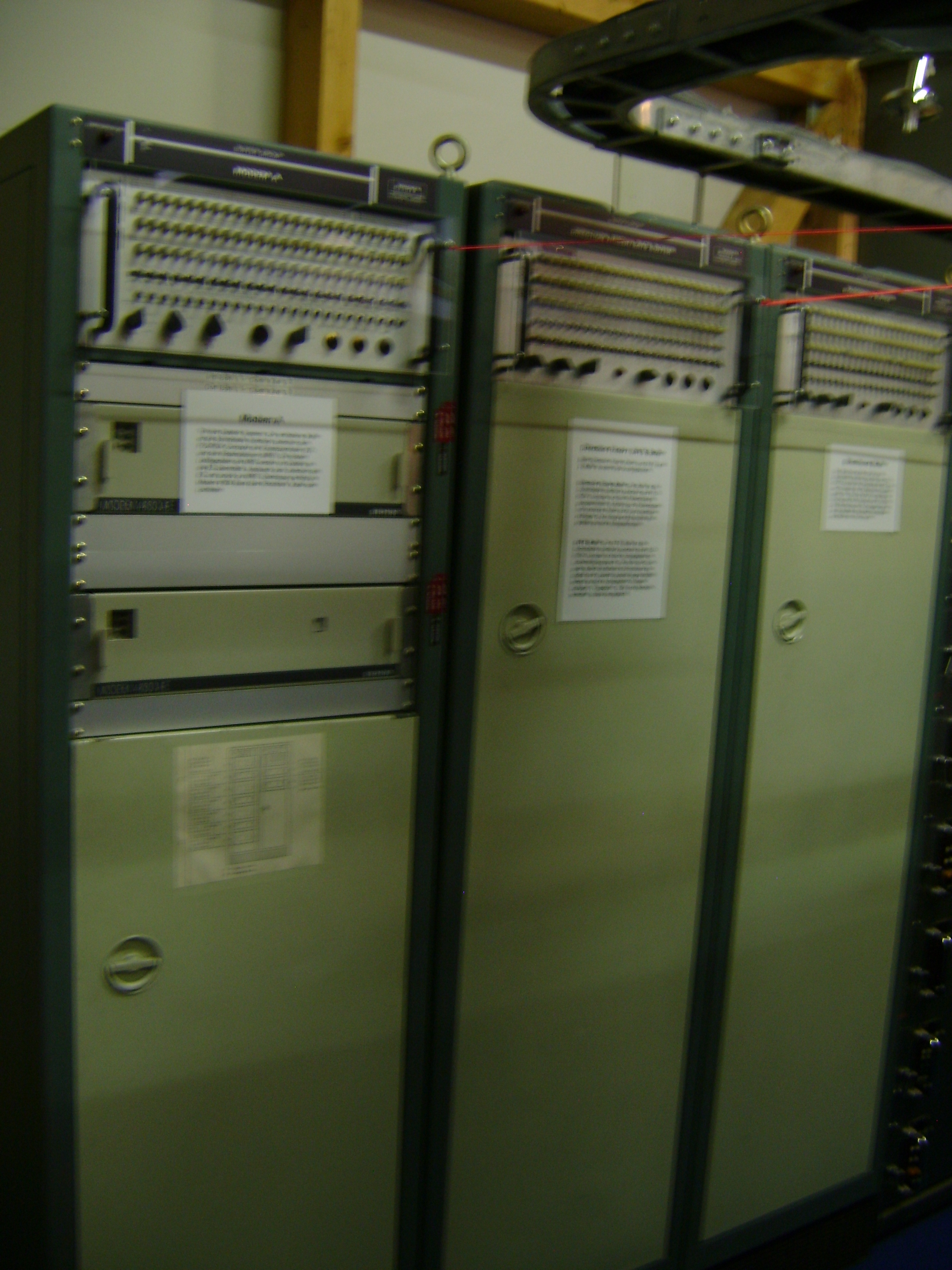
FLORIDA Computer

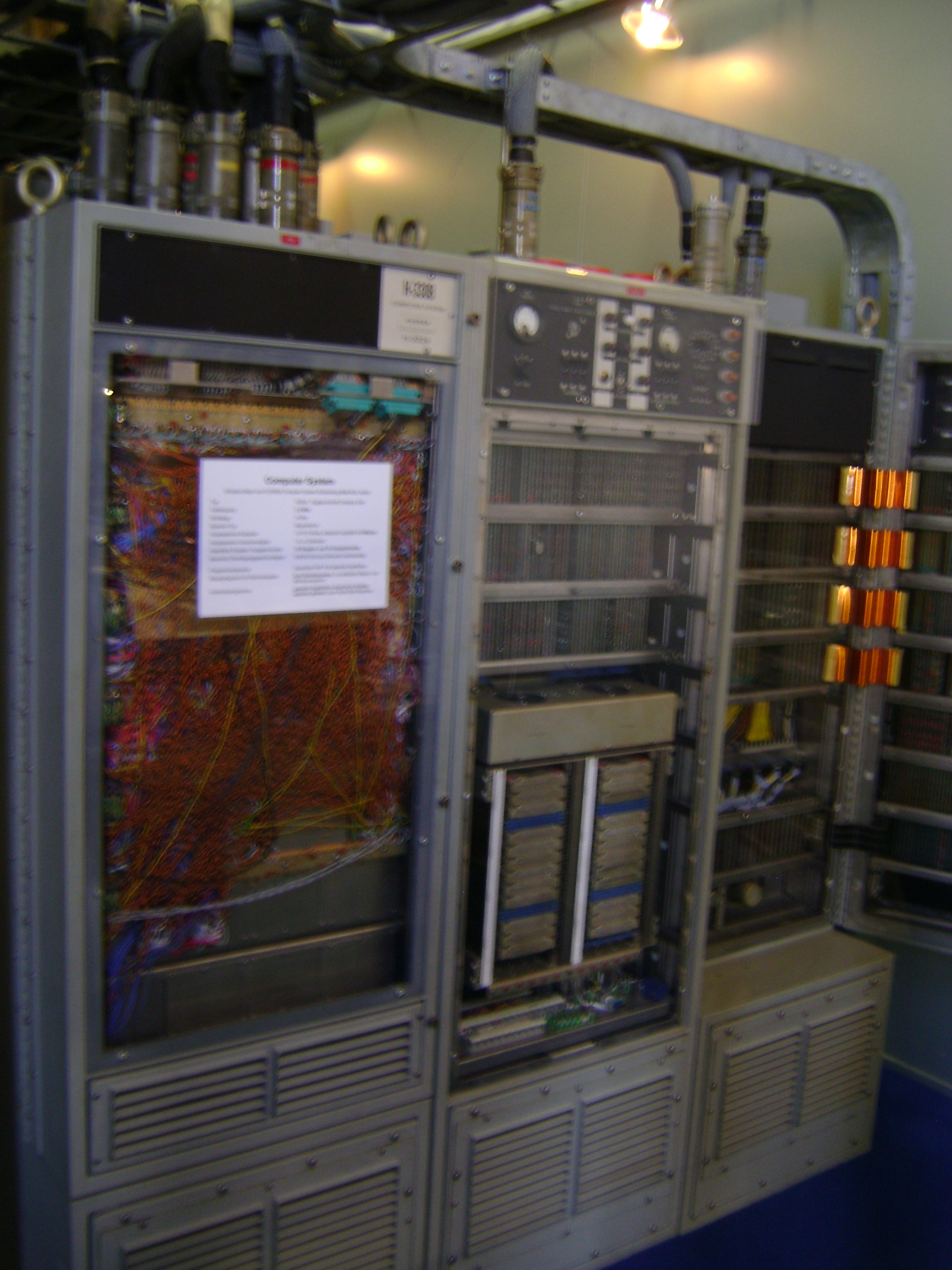
FLORIDA Computer

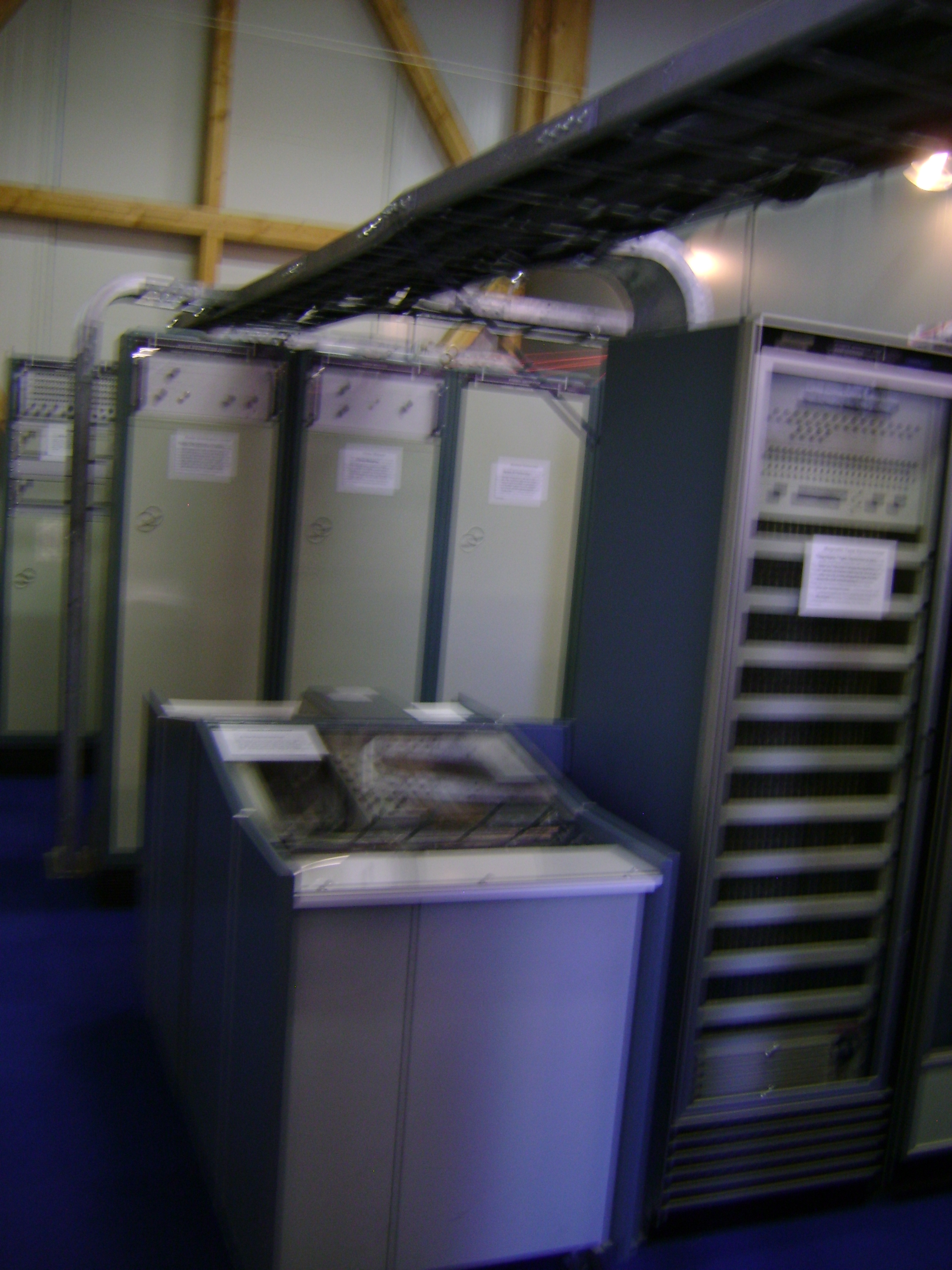
FLORIDA Computer

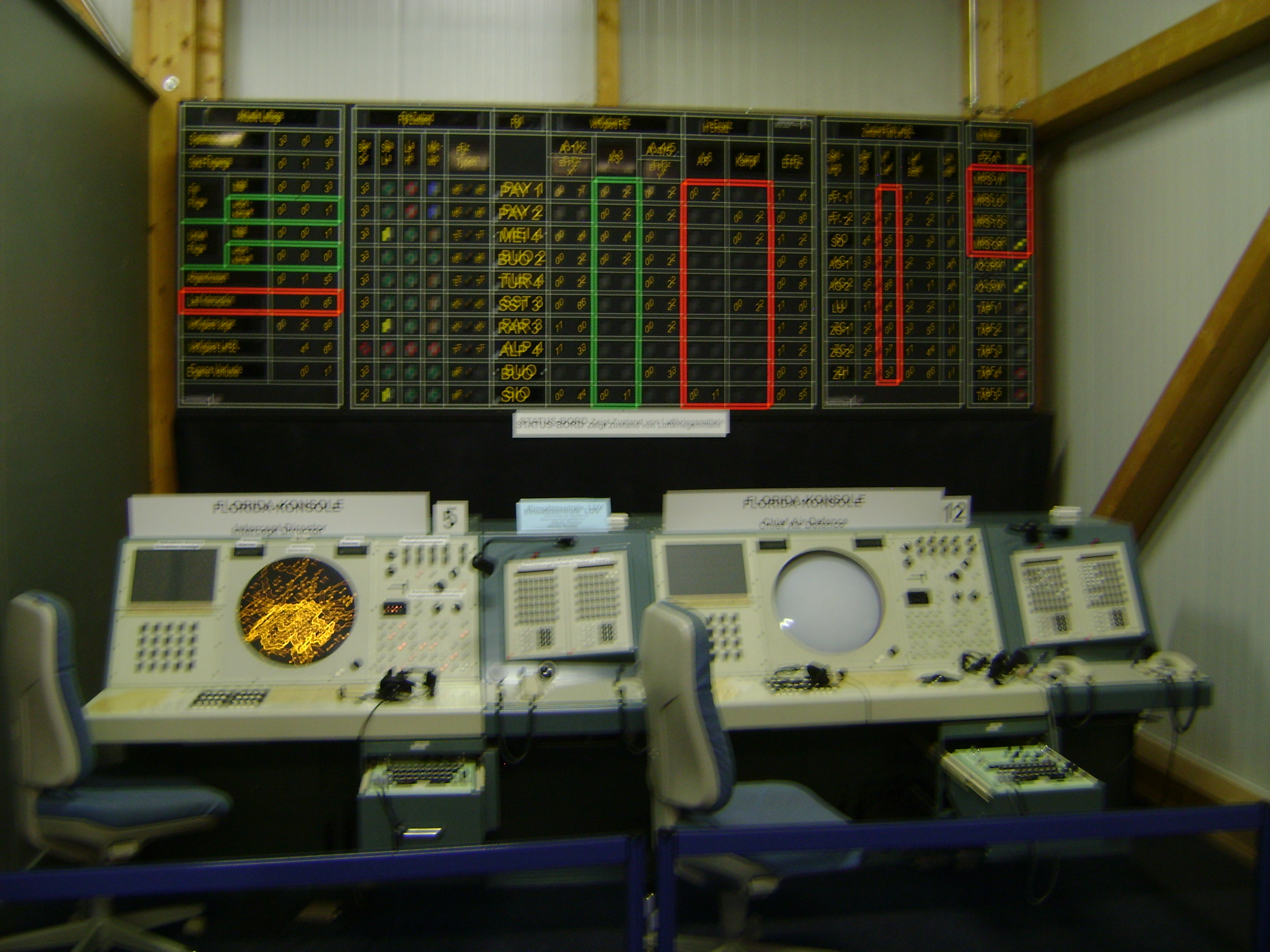
FLORIDA operational center

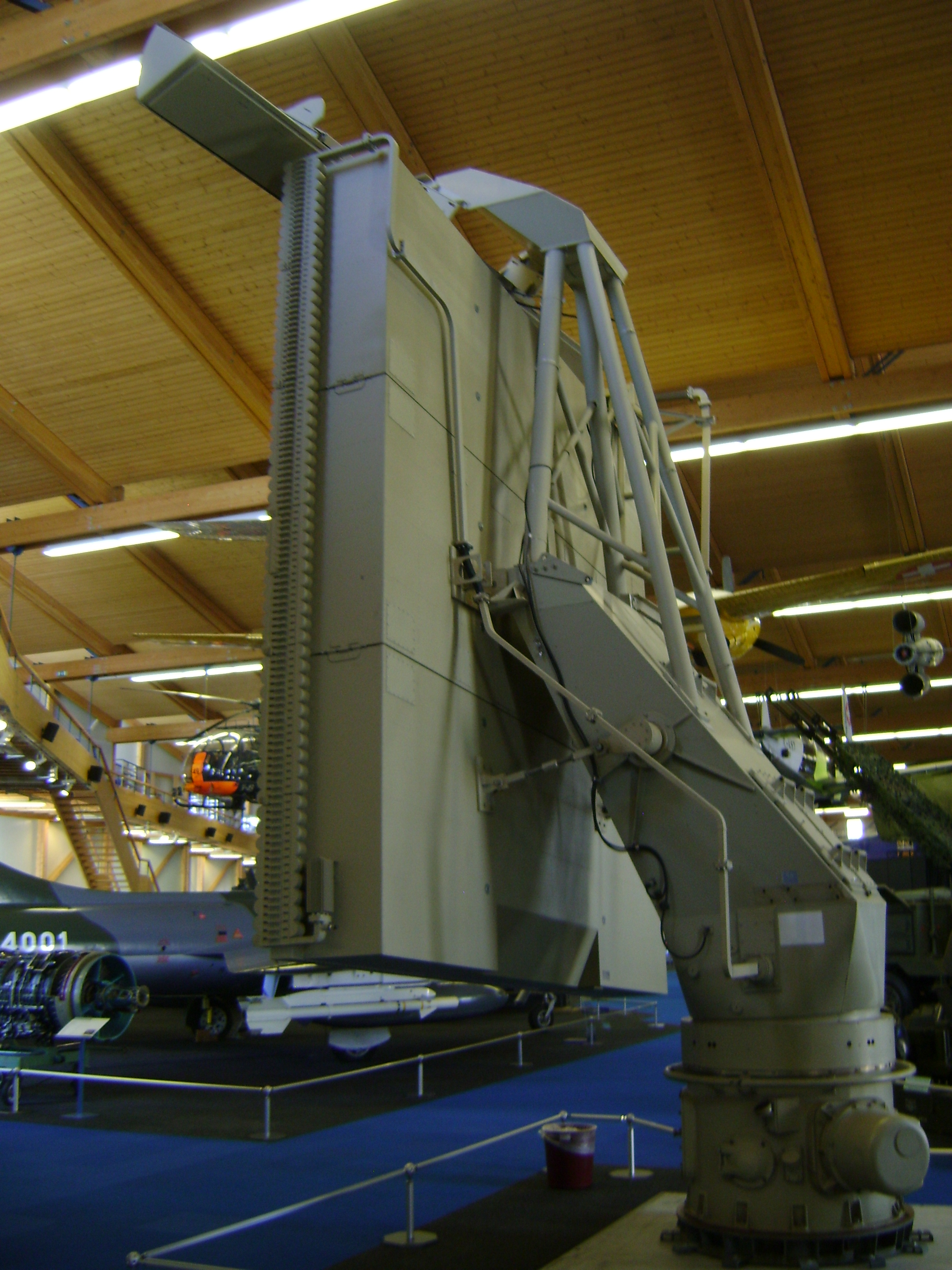
FLORIDA RADAR

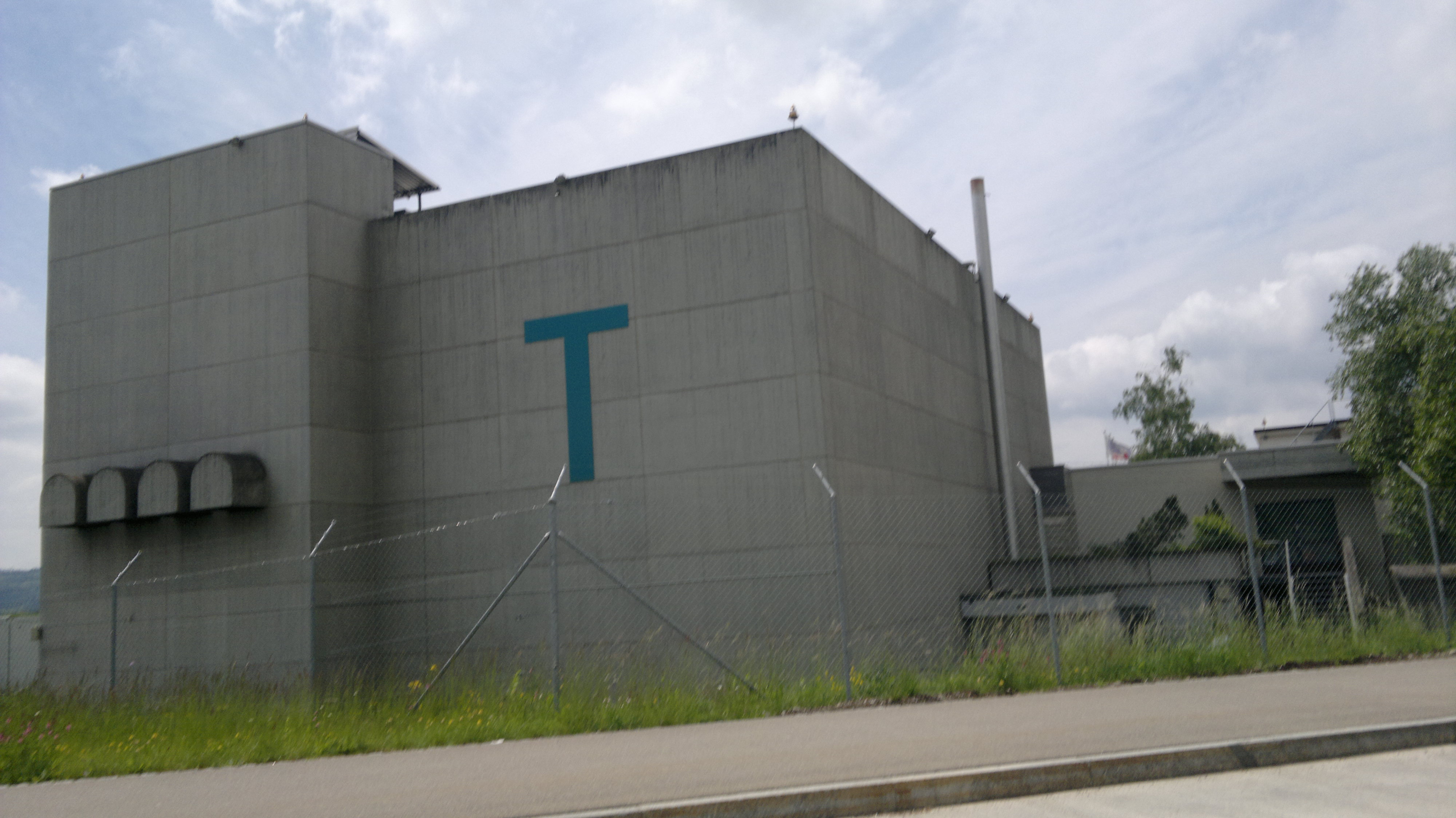
EX- FLORIDA operational center at Dübendorf

== See also ==
- LGR-1 Radar
- SRF Airspace monitoring and management system
- Target allocation radar TPS-1E
- TAFLIR
- Military of Switzerland
