= AN/TPS-70 =

Military S-band tactical 3D phased array search radar

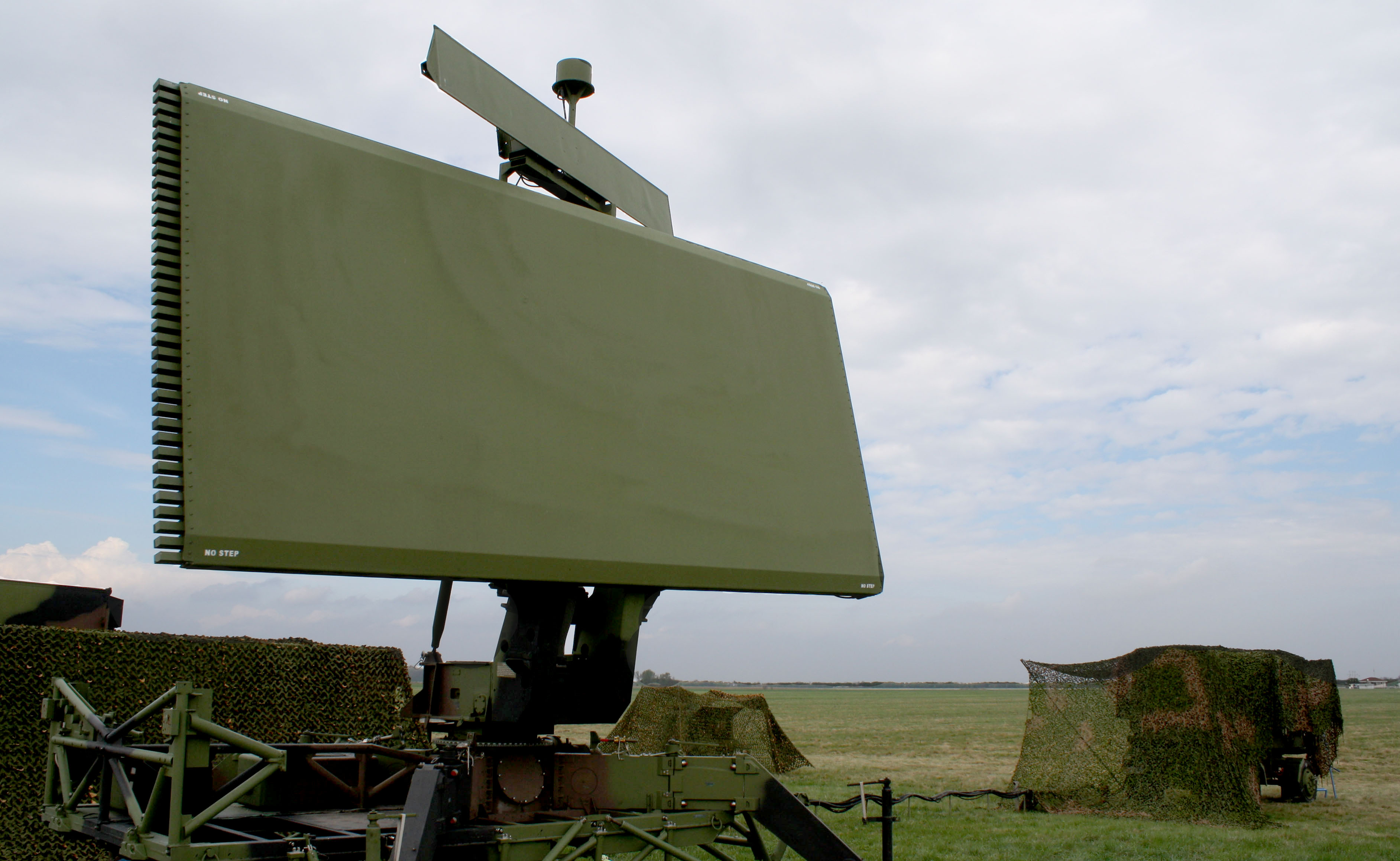
- Serbian Air Force AN/TPS-70 radar
- Country of origin: United States
- Manufacturer: Northrop Grumman
- Introduced: 1986; 39 years ago
- Type: 3D phased array
- Frequency: 2.9–3.0 GHz (10.34–9.99 cm) (S band)
- PRF: 250–275 pps
- Beamwidth: 1.5º
- Pulsewidth: 6.5 μs
- RPM: 6 rpm
- Range: 280 mi (450 km)
- Altitude: 100,000 ft (30,000 m)
- Height: 8.3 feet (2.54 m)
- Width: 18 ft (5.5 m)
- Power: 3.5 MW peak; 6.2 kW average
- Related: AN/TPS-43 predecessor; AN/TPS-78 successor

AN/TPS-70 is a mobile rotating S-band phased array 3D radar produced by Westinghouse (Northrop Grumman). It can track 500 targets, displaying target range, height, azimuth, identification friend or foe (IFF) information from an altitude of 0 to 100,000 feet (30,000 meters) to a maximum range of 240 nautical miles (440 kilometres). It is the successor of the AN/TPS-43. The TPS-70 tactical radar provides reliability, sensitivity, and accuracy, even in the face of jamming and high-clutter conditions. It is being replaced by newer systems, but is still in service all around the world.

In accordance with the Joint Electronics Type Designation System (JETDS), the "AN/TPS-70" designation represents the 70th design of an Army-Navy electronic device for ground transportable search radar system. The JETDS system also now is used to name all Department of Defense electronic systems.

== Operators ==
- United States
- United Arab Emirates
- Serbia
- Switzerland : TAFLIR
- Australia
- Canada
- Colombia
- Germany
- Greece
- Iran
- Israel
- Jordan
- Mexico
- Morocco
- Pakistan
- South Korea
- Spain
- Thailand

== See also ==
- List of radars
- List of military electronics of the United States
