= SRF Airspace monitoring and management system =

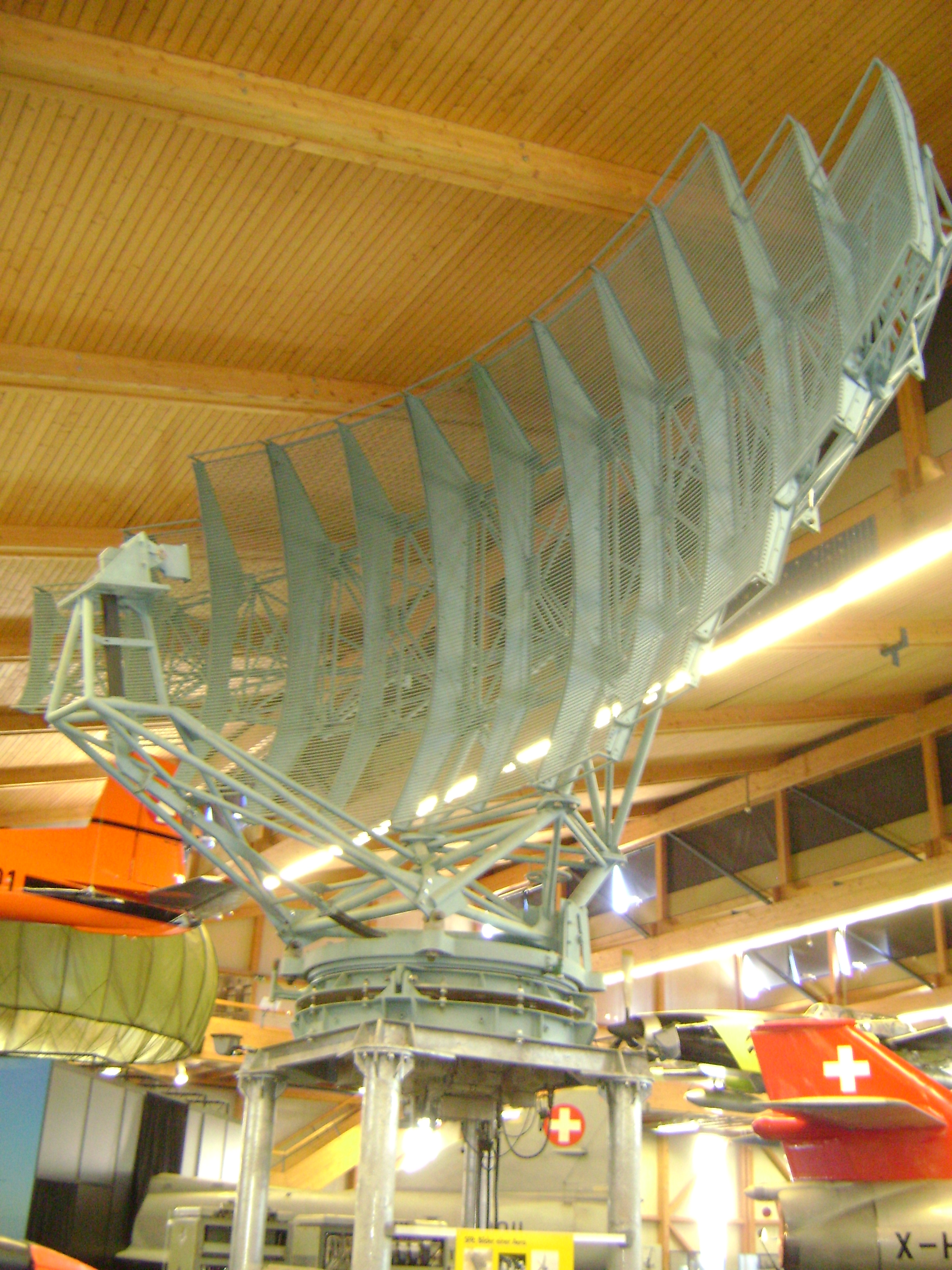
SFR Radarantenne at the Flieger-Flab-Museum Dübendorf

The SFR Airspace monitoring and management system was the first Airspace monitoring and management system of the Swiss Air Force.

== History ==
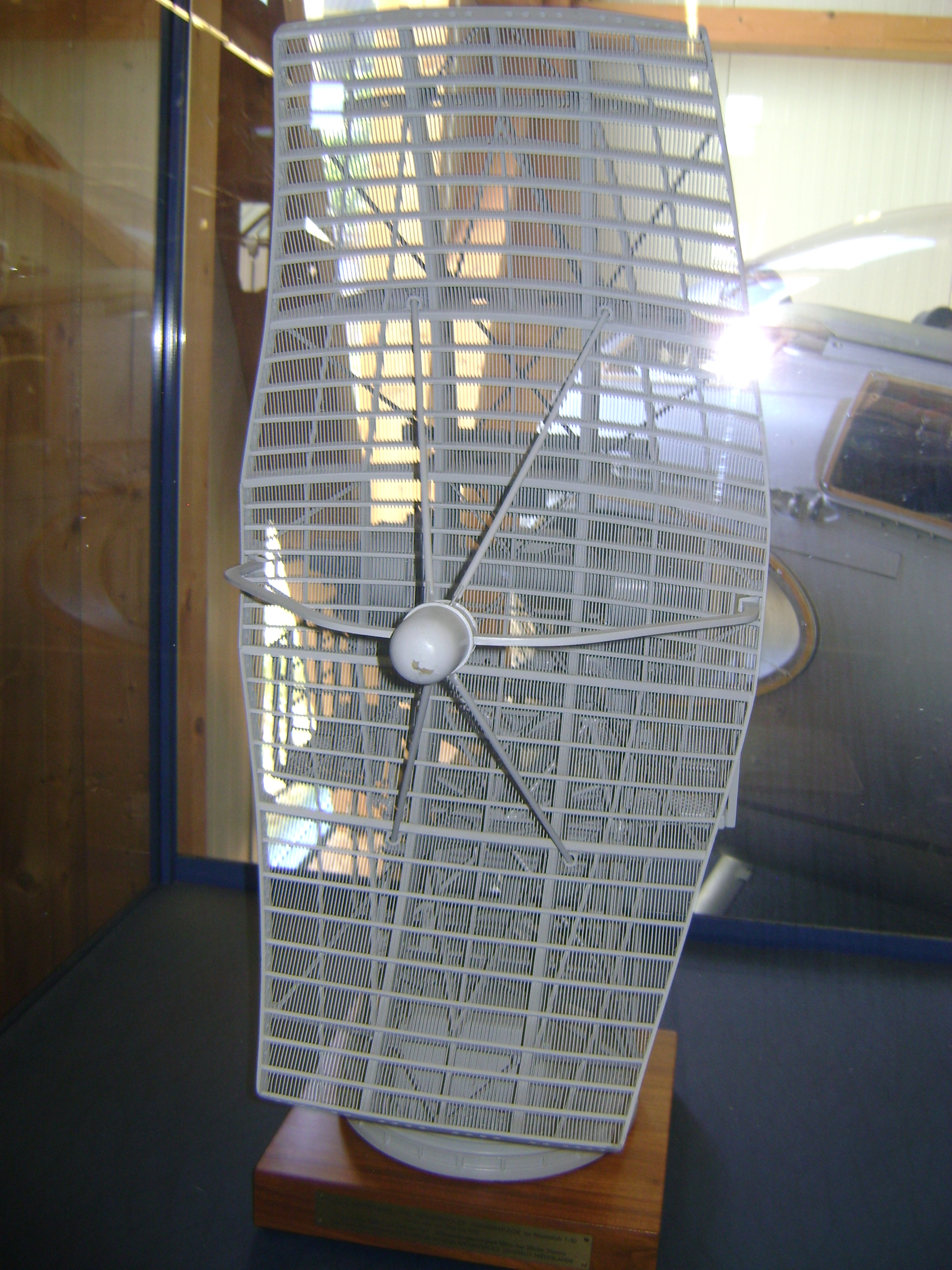
SFR Heightradarantenne, Model at the Flieger-Flab-Museum Dübendorf

After the second world war it became apparent that the rapid development of air defense of Switzerland without a comprehensive air surveillance was unrealistic. However, Switzerland lacked knowledge of such systems and the victorious Allies of World War II restricted both the sharing of knowledge and the sale of new radar equipment. Only the LGR-1 Radar was available. It was used to find suitable locations for the radar antennas of the SFR system.

The core of the SFR system was the French ER-200 early warning and guidance radar from the Société Française Radioélectrique. The system was ordered on 31 January 1952, in a larger number of radar systems, radar components from which were compiled by its own architecture. From 1955 to 1966, a school complex in Dübendorf (the Radar Doerfli ("Radar village") on the training site Dürrbach, one on the top of Bütschelegg (above Bern-Belp) and the plants on 4 height locations (mountain peaks) were formed for the first radar aerial surveillance system of Switzerland. The airspace monitoring system also included an aboveground command center in Dübendorf as well as an underground command center on the Tschorren above the Brünig Pass. In these command centers put the data of the radarsites together to a national wide air surveillance picture. From these command centers where also the own aircraft guided by tactical fighter controllers.

== See also ==
- LGR-1 Radar
- Target allocation radar TPS-1E
- FLORIDA Airspace monitoring and management system
- TAFLIR
- FLORAKO
