= Target allocation radar TPS-1E =

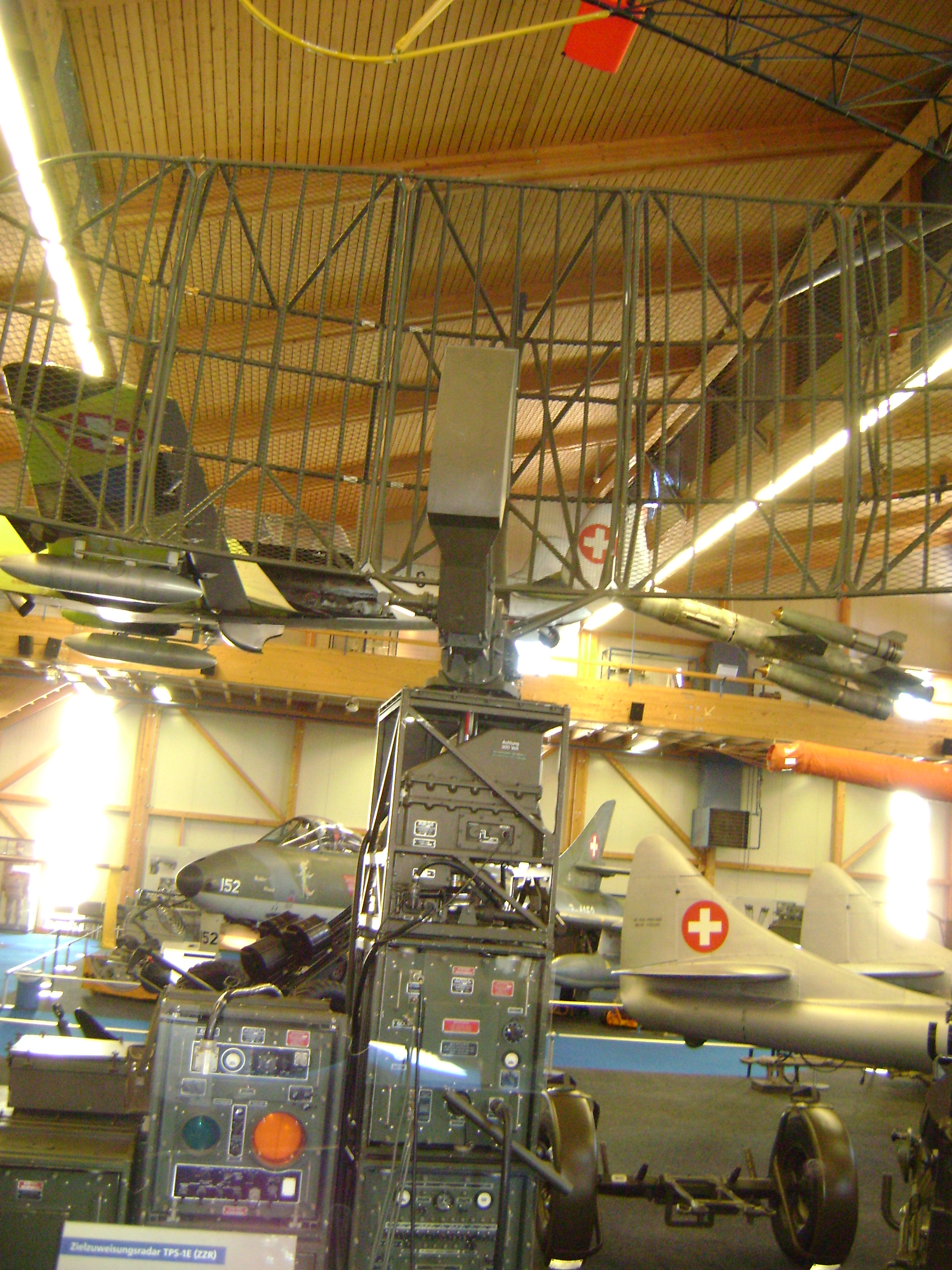
Zielzuweisungsradar TPS-1E at the Flieger-Flab-Museum

The Target allocation radar TPS-1E (German: Zielzuweisungsradar (ZZR) TPS-1E) is an omnidirectional pulse radar device. It was used from 1958 until 1989 by the Swiss Air Force. It was also used by German army (Heer) air defence reconnaissance platoons up until the early 1990s.

== History ==
TPS-1E was ordered in the late 1950s for the heavy antiaircraft units. Target data were transmitted by telephone or radio to anti-aircraft artillery batteries. In the radar equipped batteries with the Fire control radar Mark VII, the Parallax computer Meta converted the data to local coordinates. In the remaining heavy antiaircraft radar batteries, data were used in manual targeting. In the middle of 1963 the ZZR was used together with the new Air Defence Operations Center 63 for the same task. After the introduction of fire control unit 75, Skyguard ZZR was incorporated in the new mobile radar units. It was used until the introduction of the TAFLIR systems in 1989.

== Specifications ==
- Version E of the AN/TPS-1
- Manufacturer: Microlamda SpA, Italy (joint venture company of Finmeccanica and Raytheon), license of Raytheon USA
- Frequency : 1220–1350 MHz
- PW: 2,5 ĩS
- PI: 500 kW
- Antenna speed : 20 RPM
- Rmax : Fighter jets 40 km, Bombers 80 km
- Construction: 6 elements, ca. 650 kg
- Antenna: 4.95 m x 1.95 m, 115 kg
- Power unit: AEG Aggregat 43,5PS 15 kVA 115 V/400 Hz
- Staff: 1 officer, 2 non-commissioned officers, 6 soldiers
- Weight: ca. 1750 kg

== See also ==
- AN/TPS-1
- LGR-1 Radar
- SRF Airspace monitoring and management system
- FLORIDA Airspace monitoring and management system
- TAFLIR
- FLORAKO
- List of military electronics of the United States
