= FLORAKO =

Swiss radar system for military and civil aviation

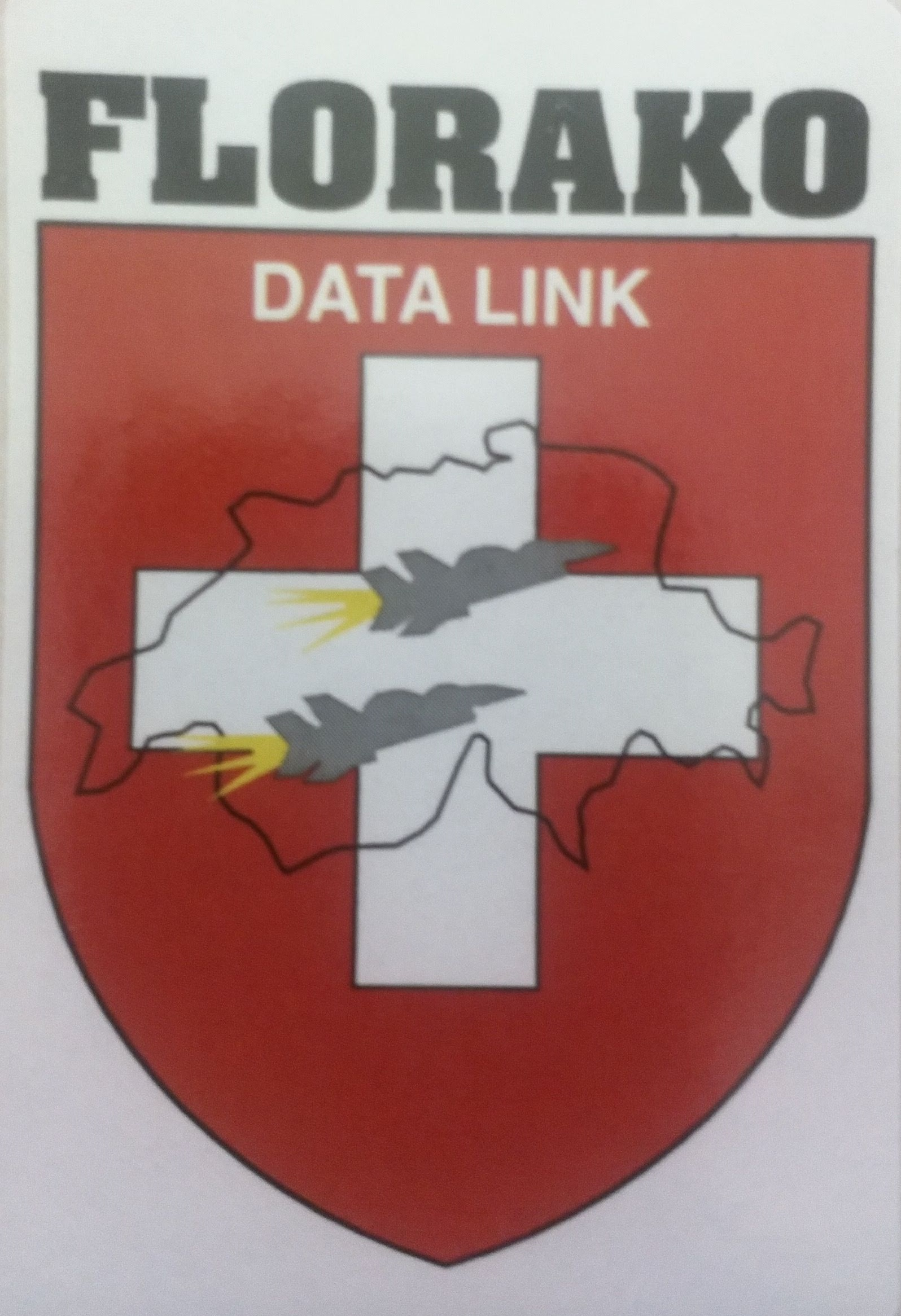
FLORAKO Emblem

FLORAKO is a Swiss radar system for military and civil aviation. The acronym stands for FLORIDA radar replacement air radar system capable communication system (in German: FLORIDA Radarersatz Radarluftlagesystem Kommunikationssystem) in the initial phase of the project meant the name FLORES RALUS KOMSYS and emerged from the project name of the sub-systems. There are four surface to air missile tubes located on the site.

== Procurement ==
The FLORAKO System was Introduced on 2 February 2004 by the Swiss Air Force. It replaces the older FLORIDA Airspace monitoring and management system, which dated back from the 1960s. The acquisition costs amounted to approximately 728 million Swiss francs. The four radar sites Mount Pilatus, Scopi, Weisshorn and Weissfluh are classified and therefore not publicly available. Thales Raytheon Systems, which is a joint venture between Raytheon Company and Thales Group, supplied the system. Thales Raytheon Systems was also involved of the further expansion of the system that was delivered in 2008 and still carries out further upgrades of the system. In January 2017, Thales was commissioned by Armasuisses to modernize the FLORAKO system, extending its operational capabilities through to 2030.

== Technology ==
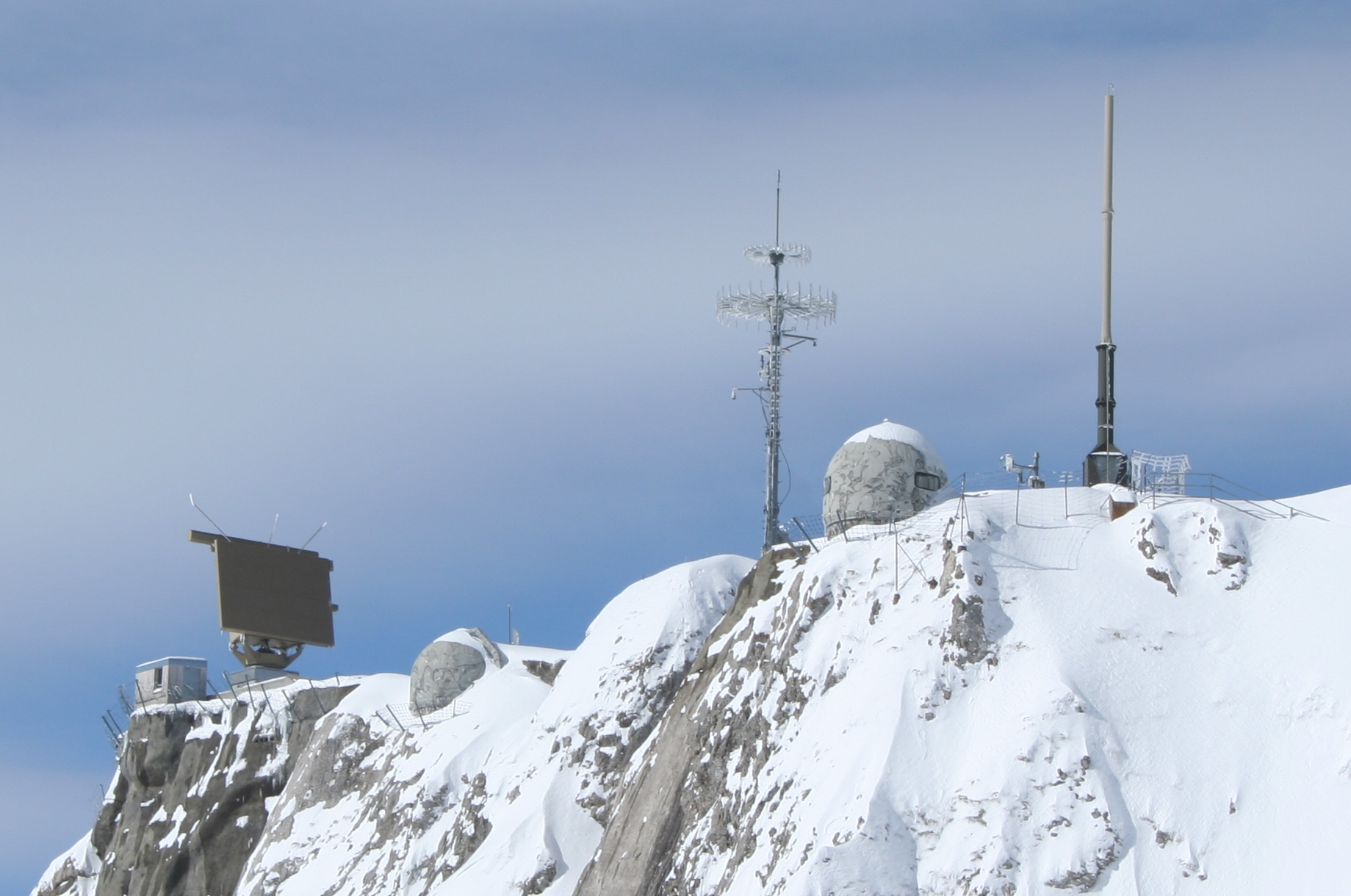
FLORAKO on Mount Pilatus

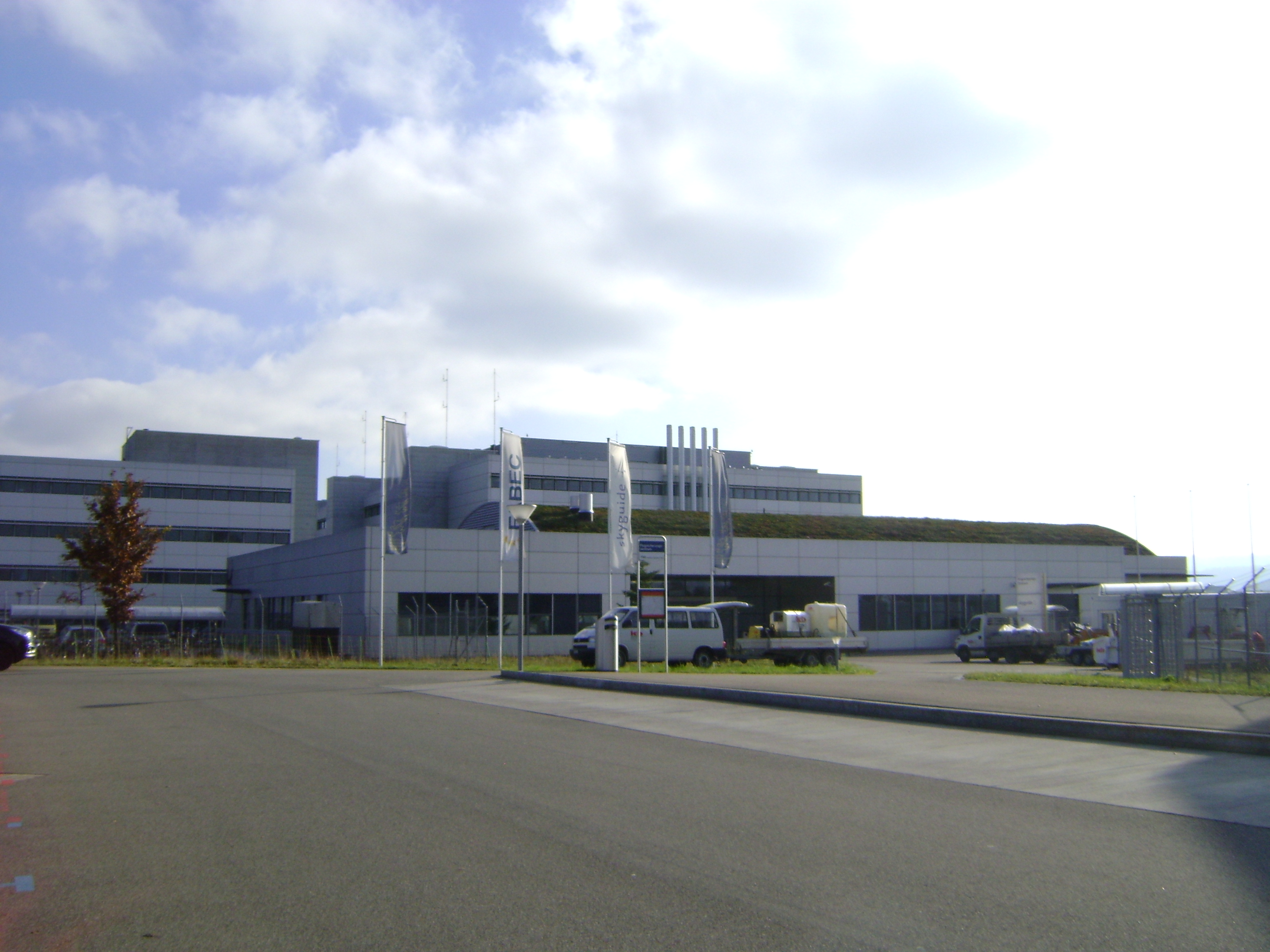
Peacetime FLORAKO Mission Control is located at the Skyguide & Air Force building at Dübendorf

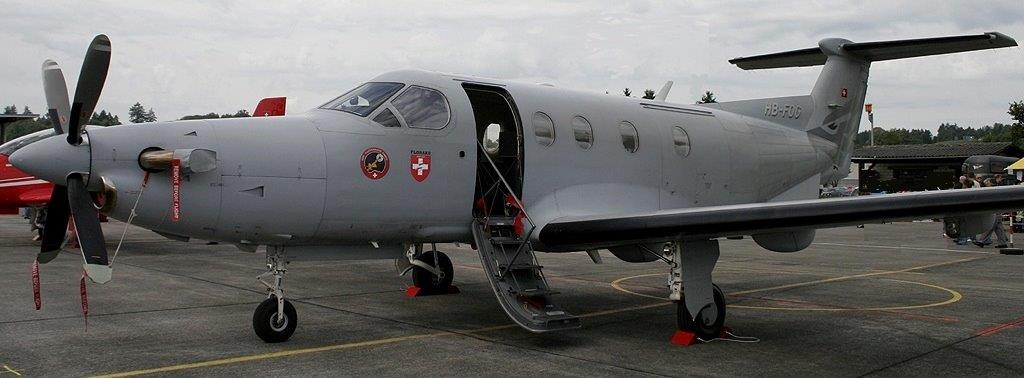
Pilatus PC-12 HB-FOG

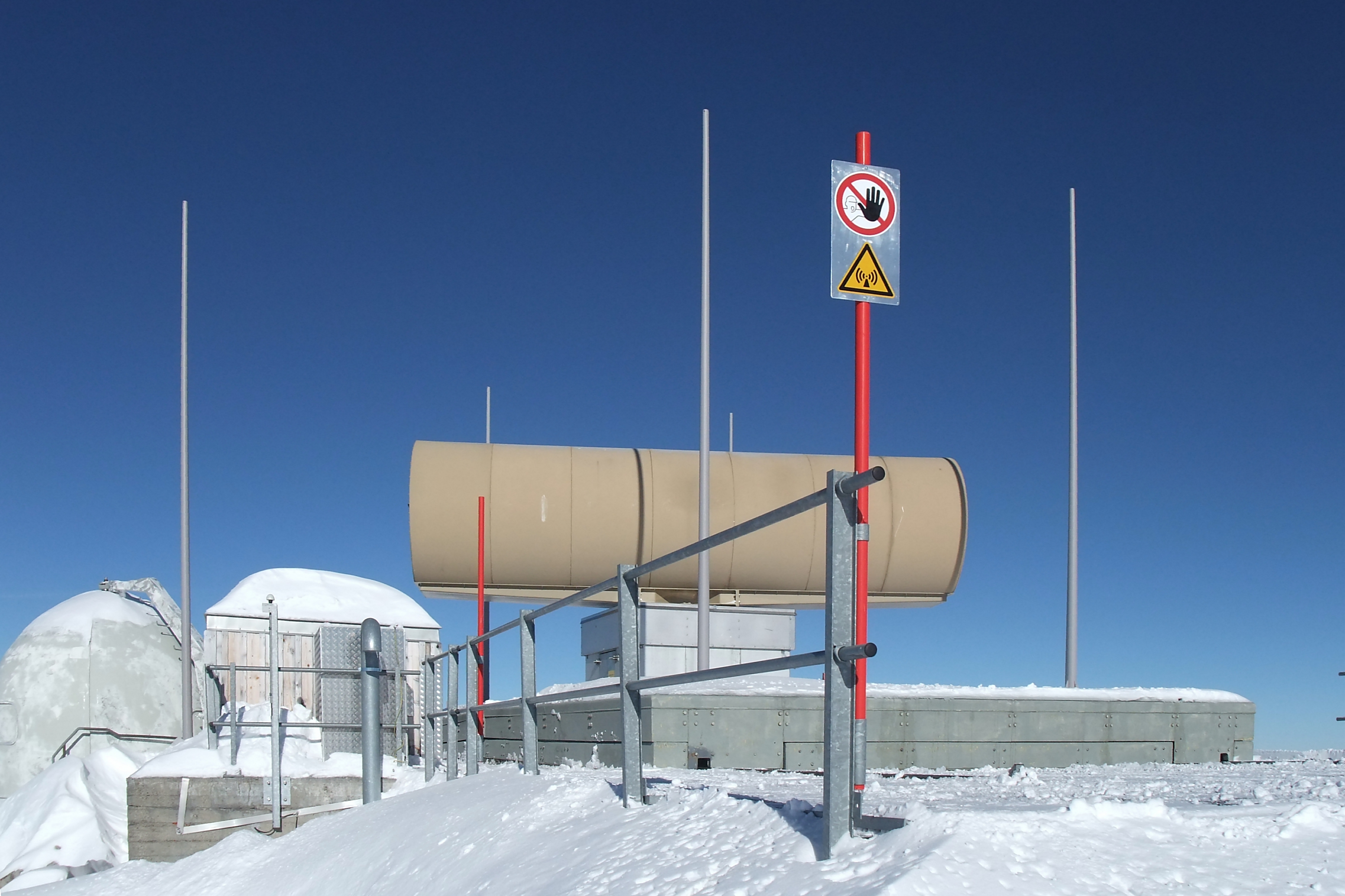
FLORAKO secondary radar

The FLORAKO radar system is used for air defense. It consists of an air surveillance radar in semiconductor technology, and a secondary radar subsystem for simulation. The 3D objective FLORAKO provides real-time information, correlated with the secondary radar data over a wide detection area. The FLORAKO constantly works with 15 Rpm rotating phased array antenna. At least one of these Command, Control, and Communications (C3) facilities is always connected to the Air Defense & Direction Center (the ADDC or air ops center) at Dübendorf and fully operational on-line on a 24/7 basis, controlling Swiss airspace. Depending on the international situation, more facilities will be staffed up; in case of crisis or war (ADDC and 4 facilities operational) the coverage will be extended far beyond the Swiss boundaries. Each of these AirOps facilities is capable of making all battle management decisions in case the ADDC or the other AirOps facilities might be eliminated.

Operational lifetime of this system is guaranteed by its manufacturers for at least 25 years. The system consists of:

- A communication system KOMSYS. Integrating element of all geographically divided parts of the FLORAKO system processing speech, data communications, and system commands in a single data network to enable the exchange of radar data with the FLORAKO and the Link-16 equipped aircraft and allow fighter pilots to have a 360° radar coverage. Fighters can also transmit their own radar information in blank spots of the FLORAKO radars, such as valleys. The Swiss Link 16 and FLORAKO can, if needed, collaborate with foreign Link-16 equipped aircraft (e.g. French Boeing E-3 Sentry AWACS), provided a similar MIDS (Multifunctional Information Distribution System) keycode is used.
- A radar system FLORES. Consisting of standard high-power search radars, advanced radars (search mode, high-update ratio, and special functions), and civil authority monopulse secondary radars. The four radar stations are the main data sources and are complemented by existing military and civil radar data.
- A radar layer-system RALUS. Translating the data automatically into flight paths and producing a complete civil-military air picture for all authorities.
- A warning message system LUNAS-EZ. AirOps Centers are the combining factors between the FLORAKO system with real-time data (air picture, planning, and environmental data) and its military users. Workstations are identically configured and built accordingly to latest ergonomics, state of the art visual colour hi-res technology, menu guidance, and known user environment. The Dübendorf Air Defense & Direction Center – as well as the air operations units in the Alps – are equally equipped, thus assuring full-time operational redundancy in producing the actual air picture, defence of Swiss airspace, early warning, command and control, air policing and coordination of civil and military air traffic.
- The Military-Civil Airspace Management System MICAMS. This secondary system provides a computing backup for flexible airspace use for both civil and military flight security.

The radar system may eventually be completed by mobile TAFLIR (TAktische FLIeger Radars - Tactical Flight Radars). These AN/MPQ-64 radars are a variant of the Northrop Grumman AN/TPS-75 and are deployable in areas of difficult terrain or where specific coverage is needed. Peacetime TAFLIR deployment locations are at Dübendorf and Emmen. In time of crisis or at war they can be deployed anywhere. The FLORAKO is a modified version of the requirements for Swiss radars Master A and Master M from Thales. In addition to the data of the FLORAKO radar stations and the data of the mobile TAFLIR radars and civil Skyguide radar data can be fed into the FLORAKO system. The armasuisse, an independent branch of the MoD, operates a special equipped Pilatus PC-12 with the civil registration HB-FOG to calibrate the radars, MIDS Link-16 and Radiocomunication of the FLORAKO system.

Specifications Master M

- frequency range = S-band
- pulse repetition = classified
- pulse repetition frequency = classified
- Transmission time (PW) = classified
- reception time = classified
- dead time = classified
- pulse power = classified
- Average power = classified
- Displaying Distance = up to 470 km
- Distance resolution = 200 m
- opening angle = 3 °
- number of hits = Monopulse radar
- Antenna rotation = 4 s

Specifications Master-A

- frequency range = S-band
- pulse repetition = classified
- pulse repetition frequency = ?
- Transmission time (PW) = classified
- reception time = classified
- dead time = classified
- pulse power = classified
- Average power = classified
- Displaying Distance = up to 370 km
- Distance resolution = 220 m
- opening angle = classified
- number of hits = Monopulse radar
- Antenna rotation = 4 s

== See also ==
- LGR-1 Radar
- SRF Airspace monitoring and management system
- Target allocation radar TPS-1E
- FLORIDA Airspace monitoring and management system
- TAFLIR
