= TAFLIR =

TAFLIR is the abbreviation for the "Tactical Flight Radar" of the Swiss Air Force. TAFLIR is used to improve the Recognized Air Picture and to support air traffic control and air surveillance of the Swiss Air Force.

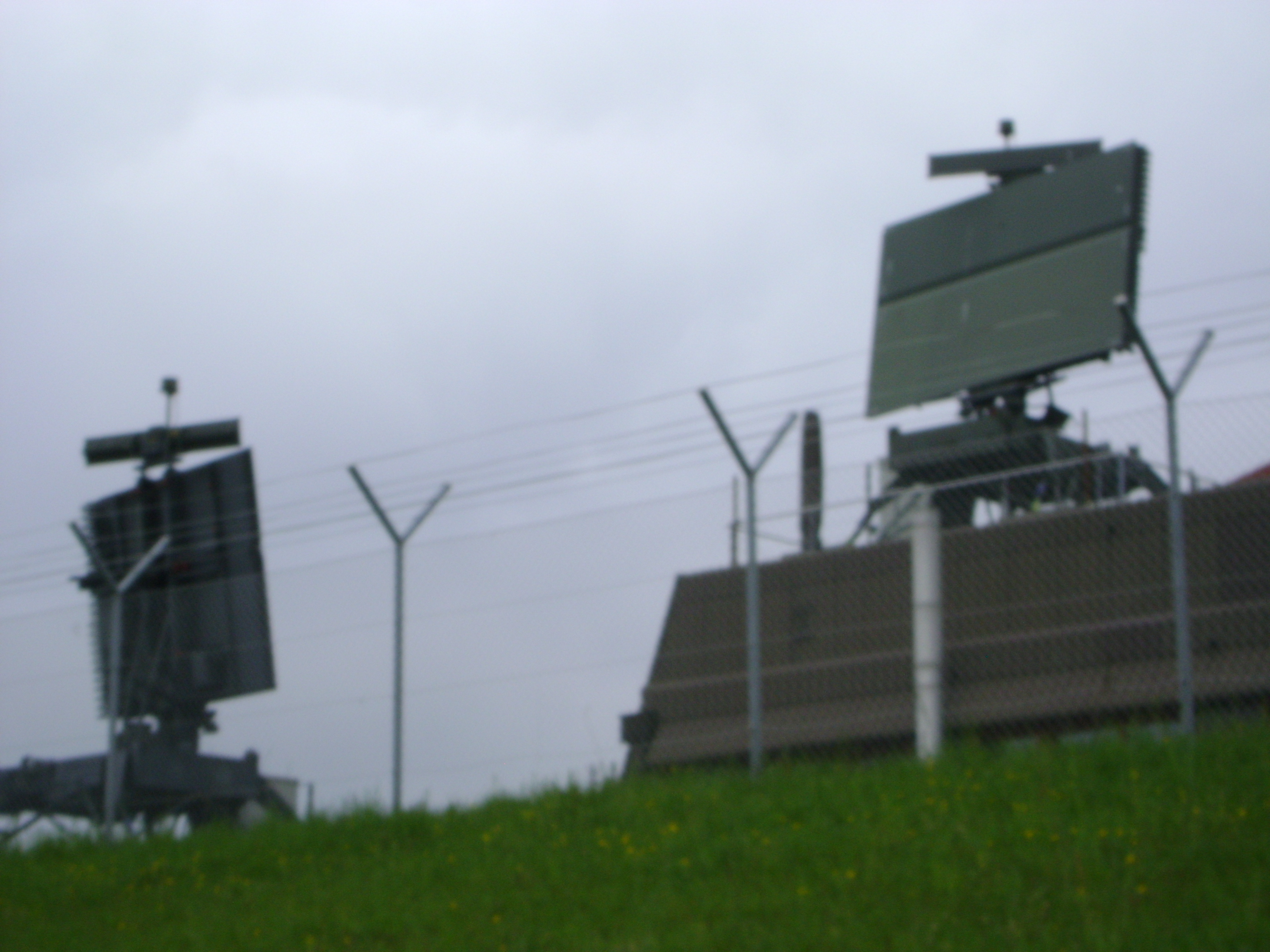
A TAFLIR system at the permanent site and maintenance facility Wangen mountain, near Duebendorf, next to a second TAFLIR antenna currently not mounted on a truck

== Background ==
The topography of Switzerland is such that certain areas and even radar shadows do not allow surveillance by permanently installed radars placed on mountains. In 1985, five mobile radar systems were purchased for 254 million Swiss francs in order to address this problem. Switzerland procured the mobile radars to improve the nation's aerial warfare capability. However, the system's viability in a military operation was a controversial matter that was brought to attention and addressed in the initial attack waves of the Iraq War.

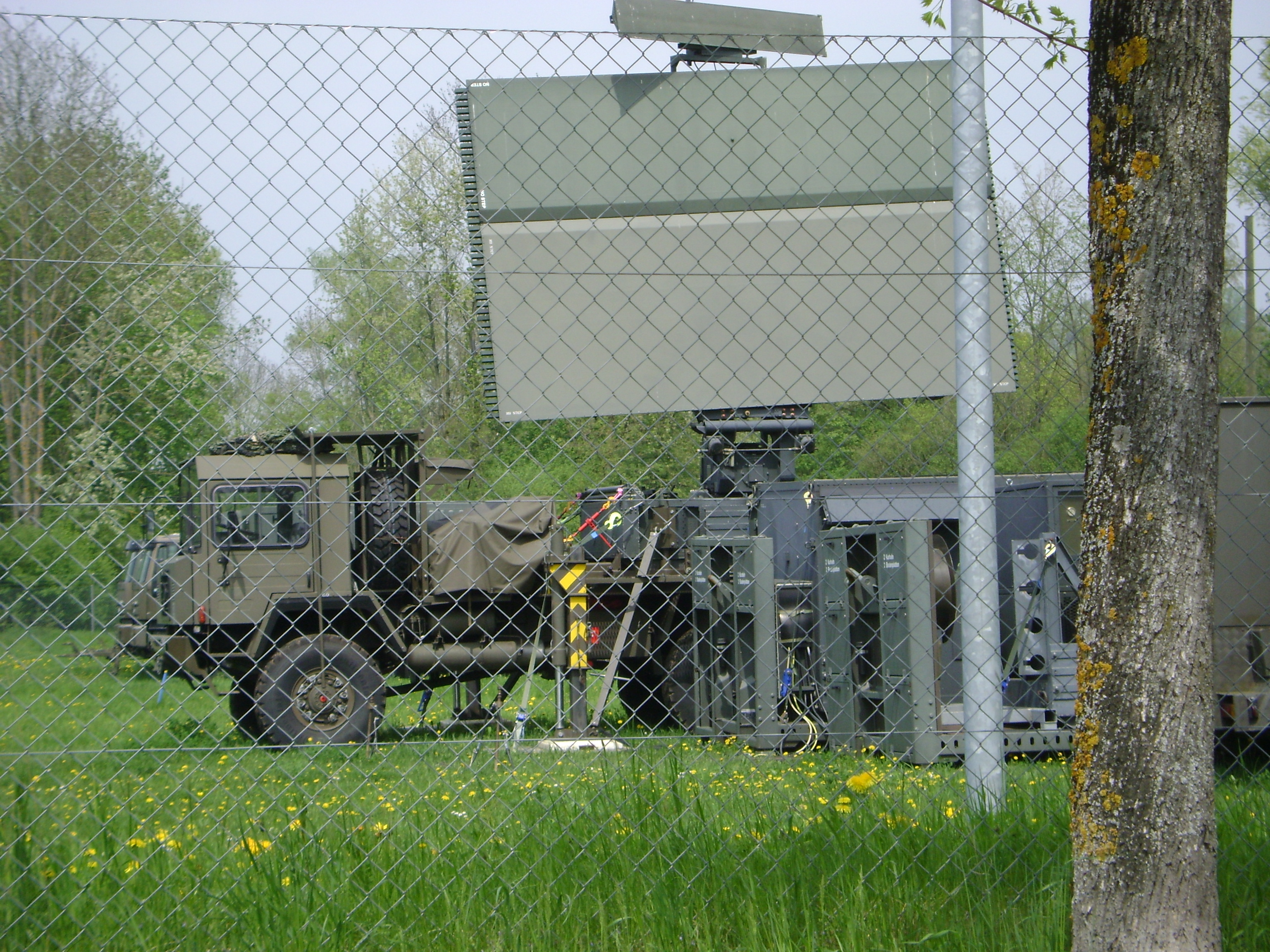
A TAFLIR ready for use on a Saurer 10DM truck, near Duebendorf AFB

== Technology ==
TAFLIR is a version of the AN/TPS-70 radar produced by Westinghouse (now Northrop Grumman), modified for Swiss requirements. It replaced the Target Allocation Radar TPS-1E. These AN/MPQ-64 radars are a variant of the Northrop Grumman AN/TPS-75 and can be deployed in areas of difficult terrain to improve the Recognized Air Picture. Peacetime TAFLIR deployment locations are at Dübendorf and Payerne. In times of crisis or war they can be deployed anywhere.

They employ a phased array antenna, which reduces the appearance of side lobes by more than 50%, thus reducing vulnerability to anti-radar missiles and a secondary radar. The radar uses a phase-encoded pulse compression to improve accuracy and resolution at a distance. As an active protection measure against electronic countermeasures the frequency can be changed to pulse. The heart of the TAFLIR system is the rotating antenna mounted on a truck. Containers hold further components such as radar electronics, terminal operation and cooling equipment. The modular TAFLIR system allows vehicles can be exchanged and the TAFLIR may relocate within hours. Radar data of the TAFLIR are fed directly to the FLORAKO system.

- Name = AN/TPS-70 (modified)
- Frequency = 2.9-3.1 GHz (S-band)
- PRT = classified
- PRF = 235–275 Hz
- PW = 4.8 ± 0.25 ĩS
- Home time = classified
- Deadtime = classified
- PI = 2.8 MW
- PAVE = 4.7 kW
- Rmax = 80 km
- Distance resolution = 30/200 meters
- Theta = 1.1 °
- Hits = number classified
- Antenna speed RPM = 4.5 / min

== Deployment ==
In times of peace, the system is stationed near military airfields to improve the Recognized Air Picture. Any systems not in use are stored in particular electromagnetic pulse-protected caverns. The TAFLIR system can operate in any location accessible by truck and can be deployed within a few hours.

TAFLIR is deployed to support security during annual World Economic Forum meetings in Davos, Switzerland. A mobile radar LW company is required to operate a TAFLIR system. All the mobile companies belong to Air Force Radar Battalion 2.

The Austrian Tiefflieger Acquisition Radar (TER) is a comparable system.

TAFLIR deployment locations are at Dübendorf and Payerne. In times of crisis or war they can be redeployed elsewhere.

== See also ==
- GIRAFFE 4A, portable ground radar
- Ground Master 400, another ground-based, non-fixed (i.e., transportable) search radar (AN/TPS)
- AN/TPS-43
- AN/TPS-75
- LGR-1 Radar
- SRF Airspace monitoring and management system
- Target allocation radar TPS-1E
- FLORIDA Airspace monitoring and management system
- FLORAKO
