= 5.56×45mm NATO =

Service rifle cartridge

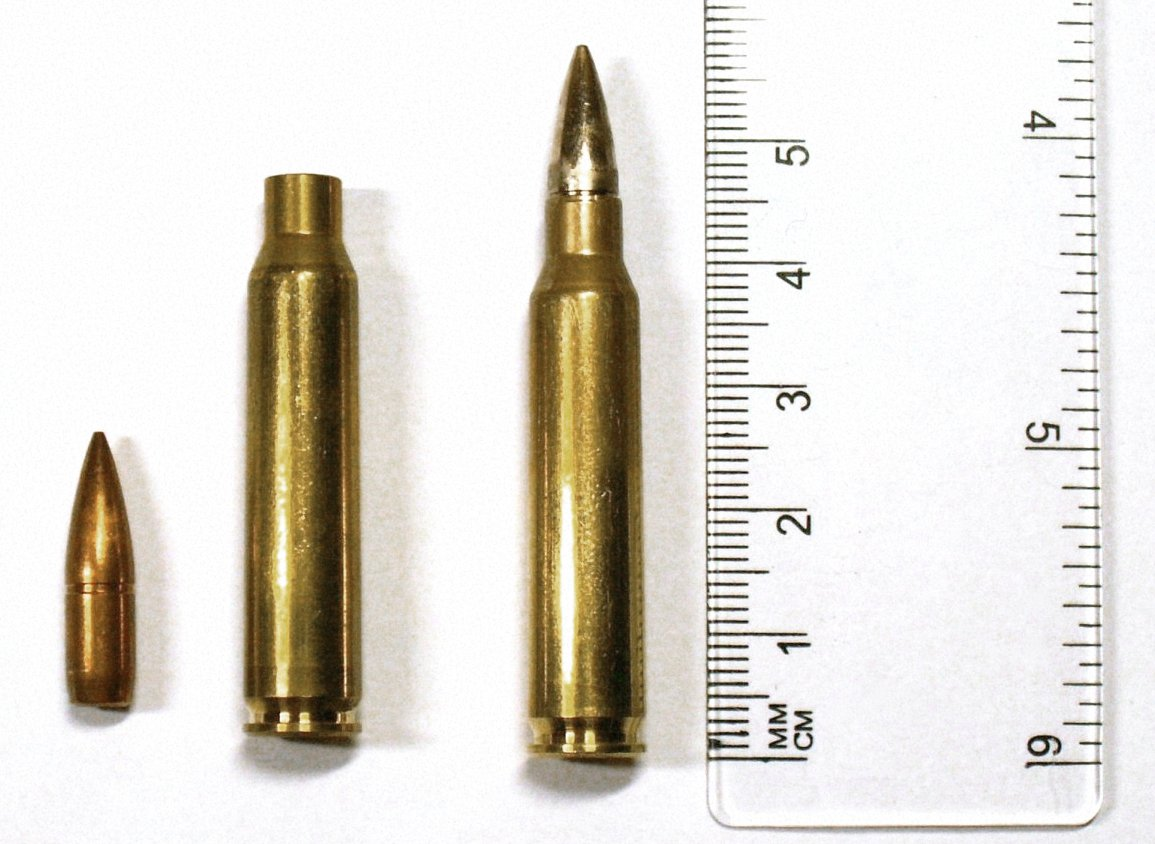
- 5.56×45mm NATO with measurement, left to right: Bullet, case, and complete cartridge
- Type: Rifle, carbine, DMR, and LMG
- Place of origin: Belgium

Service history
- In service: 1980–present
- Used by: NATO, Japan, South Korea, Taiwan, Australia, Israel, other major non-NATO allies

Production history
- Designer: FN Herstal
- Designed: late 1970s–1980

Specifications
- Parent case: .223 Remington (M193)
- Case type: Rimless tapered, bottleneck
- Bullet diameter: 5.70 mm (0.224 in)
- Land diameter: 5.56 mm (0.219 in)
- Neck diameter: 6.43 mm (0.253 in)
- Shoulder diameter: 9.00 mm (0.354 in)
- Base diameter: 9.58 mm (0.377 in)
- Rim diameter: 9.60 mm (0.378 in)
- Rim thickness: 1.14 mm (0.045 in)
- Case length: 44.70 mm (1.760 in)
- Overall length: 57.40 mm (2.260 in)
- Case capacity: 1.85 cm^{3} (28.5 gr H_{2}O)
- Rifling twist: 1 in 7 in (178 mm) or 1 in 9 in (229 mm)
- Primer type: Small rifle
- Maximum pressure (EPVAT): 430.00 MPa (62,366 psi)
- Maximum pressure (SCATP 5.56): 380.00 MPa (55,114 psi)

Ballistic performance
Bullet mass/type	Velocity	Energy
3.56 g (55 gr) XM193 FMJBT	993 m/s (3,260 ft/s)	1,755 J (1,294 ft⋅lbf)
4 g (62 gr) SS109 FMJBT	948 m/s (3,110 ft/s)	1,797 J (1,325 ft⋅lbf)
4 g (62 gr) M855A1 FMJBT	961 m/s (3,150 ft/s)	1,847 J (1,362 ft⋅lbf)
4.1 g (63 gr) DM11 FMJBT	856 m/s (2,810 ft/s)	1,496.8 J (1,104.0 ft⋅lbf)
4.1 g (63 gr) GP 90 FMJBT	851 m/s (2,790 ft/s)	1,679 J (1,238 ft⋅lbf)
5 g (77 gr) MK262 OTM	838 m/s (2,750 ft/s)	1,753 J (1,293 ft⋅lbf)
- Test barrel length: 508 mm (20.0 in); Sources: NATO EPVAT testing, QuickLOAD, SAAMI, C.I.P.

The 5.56×45mm NATO (official NATO nomenclature 5.56 NATO, commonly pronounced "five-five-six") is a rimless bottlenecked centerfire intermediate cartridge family developed in the late 1970s in Belgium by FN Herstal. It consists of the SS109, L110, and SS111 cartridges. On 28 October 1980, under STANAG 4172, it was standardized as the second standard service rifle cartridge for NATO forces as well as many non-NATO countries. Though they are not identical, the 5.56×45mm NATO cartridge family was derived from the .223 Remington cartridge designed by Remington Arms in the early 1960s, which has a near-identical case. However, firing chamber dimensions differ slightly between rifles manufactured for the designated cartridges. The differences may cause unsafe chamber pressures when firing 5.56 NATO in rifles designed for .223 Remington. Therefore, this combination is not recommended.

== History ==
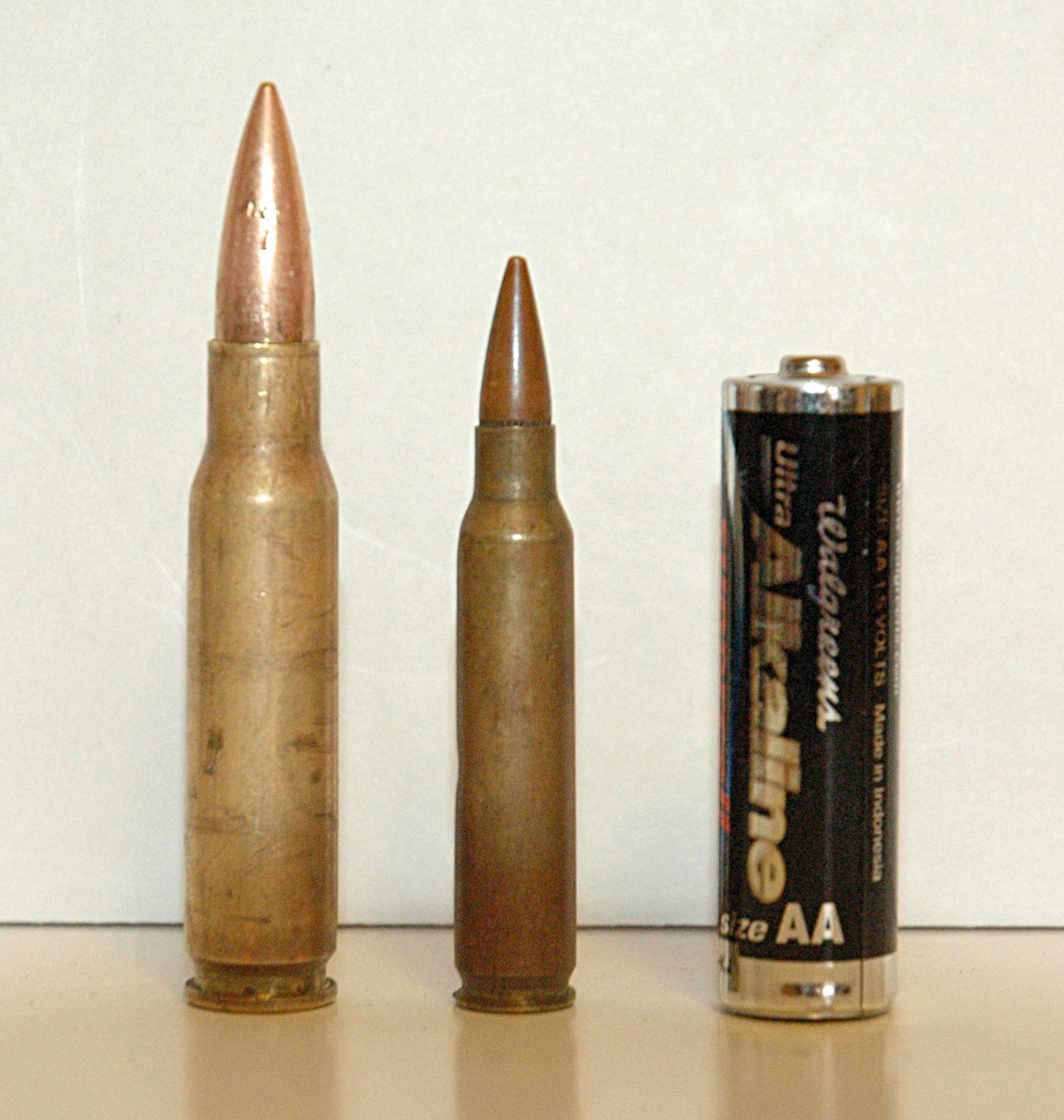
The 7.62×51mm NATO and 5.56×45mm NATO cartridges compared to an AA battery

In 1954, the larger 7.62×51mm NATO rifle cartridge was selected as the first standard NATO rifle cartridge. At the time of selection, there had been criticism that the recoil power of the 7.62×51mm NATO, when fired from a handheld lightweight modern service rifle in full automatic mode, did not allow for sufficient control, so the automatic follow-on shots would not hit the intended target but scatter around it.

The British had extensive evidence from their own experimentation with intermediate cartridges since 1945, and were on the point of adopting the .280 (7 mm × 43mm) cartridge when the selection of 7.62×51mm (.308) as the NATO standard was made. The FN company had also been involved in the development of the .280 round, including developing a version of the FN FAL in .280. The United States overruled concerns about the recoil and overall effectiveness of 7.62 mm, and the other NATO nations accepted that standardization was more important than the selection of a cartridge that was otherwise ideal.

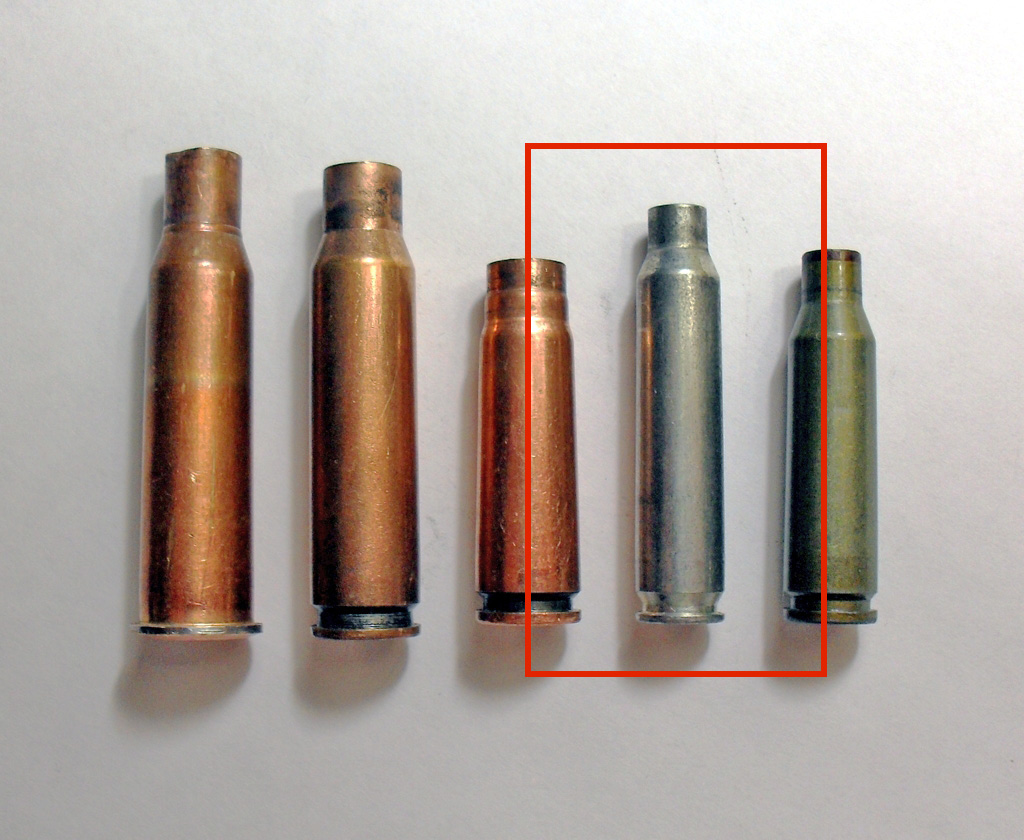
Service rifle cartridge cases: (left to right) 7.62×54mmR, 7.62×51mm NATO, 7.62×39mm, 5.56×45mm NATO, 5.45×39mm

The development of the cartridge that eventually became the .223 Remington (from which 5.56mm NATO would eventually be developed) would be intrinsically linked to the development of a new lightweight combat rifle. The cartridge and rifle were developed as a single unit by Fairchild Industries, Remington Arms, and several engineers working toward a goal set by the U.S. Continental Army Command (CONARC). Early development work began in 1957. A project to create a small-calibre, high-velocity (SCHV) firearm was created. Eugene Stoner of ArmaLite was invited to scale down the AR-10 (7.62mm) design. Winchester was also invited to participate. The parameters that were requested by CONARC:

- .22 caliber
- Bullet exceeding Mach 1 at 500 yards (457 metres)
- Rifle weight of 6 pounds (2.72 kilograms)
- Magazine capacity of 20 rounds
- Select fire for both semi-automatic and fully automatic use
- Penetration of US steel helmet through one side at 500 yd (457 m)
- Penetration of 0.135 inches (3.43 millimetres) steel plate at 500 yd (457 m)
- Accuracy and ballistics equal to M2 ball ammunition (.30-06 Springfield) out to 500 yd (457 m)
- Wounding ability equal to M1 carbine

Springfield Armory's Earle Harvey lengthened the .222 Remington cartridge case to meet the requirements. It was then known as the .224 Springfield. Concurrently with the SCHV project, Springfield Armory was developing a 7.62mm rifle. Harvey was ordered to cease all work on the SCHV to avoid any competition for resources.

Eugene Stoner of Armalite (a division of Fairchild Industries) had been advised to produce a scaled-down version of the 7.62mm AR-10 design. In May 1957, Stoner gave a live-fire demonstration of the prototype of the AR-15 for General Willard G. Wyman, Commander-in-Chief of CONARC. As a result, CONARC ordered rifles to test. Stoner and Sierra Bullet's Frank Snow began work on the .222 Remington cartridge. Using a ballistic calculator, they determined that a 55-grain bullet would have to be fired at 3,300 ft/s (1,006 m/s) to achieve the 500-yard performance necessary.

Robert Hutton (technical editor of Guns & Ammo magazine) started development of a powder load to reach the 3,300 ft/s (1,006 m/s) goal. He used DuPont IMR4198, IMR3031, and an Olin powder to work up loads. Testing was done with a Remington 722 rifle with a 22-inch Apex barrel. During a public demonstration, the round successfully penetrated the U.S. steel helmet as required. But testing showed that chamber pressures were excessively high.

Stoner contacted both Winchester and Remington about increasing the case capacity. Remington created a larger cartridge called the ".222 Special", which was loaded with DuPont IMR4475 powder. During parallel testing of the T44E4 (future M14) and the AR-15 in 1958, the T44E4 experienced 16 failures per 1,000 rounds fired compared to 6.1 for the AR-15.

Due to several different .222-caliber cartridges being developed for the SCHV project, the .222 Special was renamed .223 Remington in 1959. In May of that year, a report found that five- to seven-man squads armed with AR-15 rifles had higher hit probabilities than 11-man squads armed with M-14 rifles. At a 4th of July picnic, Air Force General Curtis LeMay fired an AR-15 and was very impressed with it. He ordered a number of them to replace M2 carbines that were in use by the Air Force. By November, testing at Aberdeen Proving Ground showed that the AR-15 failure rate had declined to 2.5 failures per 1,000 rounds, resulting in the M-16 being approved for Air Force Trials.

Marksmanship testing in 1961, comparing the M-16 to the M-14, indicated that 43% of M-16 shooters achieved "expert," while only 22% of M-14 shooters did. General LeMay subsequently ordered 80,000 rifles.

In the spring of 1962, Remington submitted the specifications of the .223 Remington to the Sporting Arms and Ammunition Manufacturers' Institute (SAAMI). In July 1962, operational testing ended with a recommendation for adoption of the M-16 rifle chambered in .223 Remington.

In September 1963, the .223 Remington cartridge was officially accepted and named "Cartridge, 5.56mm ball, M193". The specification includes a Remington-designed bullet and the use of IMR4475 powder which resulted in a muzzle velocity of 3,250 ft/s (991 m/s) and a chamber pressure of 52,000 psi.

In 1970, NATO members signed an agreement to select a second, smaller caliber cartridge to replace the 7.62×51mm NATO cartridge. Of the cartridges tendered, the .223 Remington (M193) was the basis for a new design created by FN Herstal. The FN-created cartridge was named "5.56×45mm NATO" with a military designation of SS109 in NATO and M855 in the U.S. These new SS109 ball cartridges required a 228 mm (1-in-9 inch) twist rate while adequately stabilizing the longer L110 tracer projectile required an even faster, 178 mm (1-in-7 inch), twist rate.

The Belgian 62 gr SS109 round was chosen for standardization as the second NATO standard rifle cartridge which led to the October 1980 STANAG 4172. The SS109 used a 62 gr full metal jacket bullet with a seven grain mild steel tip to move the center of gravity rearward, increasing flight stability and thereby the chances of striking the target tip-first at longer ranges, in part to meet a requirement that the bullet be able to penetrate through one side of a WWII U.S. M1 helmet at 500 yd (457 m) (which was also the requirement for the 7.62×51mm NATO). An actual helmet was not used for developmental testing; instead, an SAE 1010 or SAE 1020 mild steel plate was positioned to be struck at exactly 90 degrees. It had a slightly lower muzzle velocity but better long-range performance due to higher sectional density and a superior drag coefficient.

The .223 Remington cartridge inspired an international tendency toward relatively small-sized, lightweight, high-velocity military service cartridges that allow a soldier to carry more ammunition for the same weight compared to their larger and heavier predecessor cartridges, have favourable maximum point-blank range or "battle zero" characteristics, and produce relatively low bolt thrust and free recoil impulse, favouring lightweight arms design and automatic fire accuracy.

== Cartridge dimensions ==
The 5.56×45mm NATO has a 1.85 mL (28.5 gr H_{2}O) cartridge case capacity.

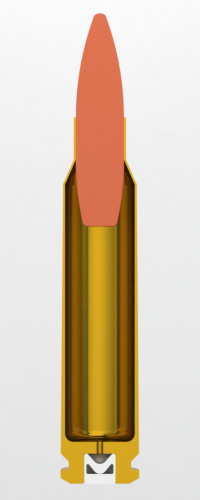
5.56×45mm NATO cross section

5.56×45mm NATO maximum NATO cartridge dimensions, all sizes in millimeters (mm)

The rifling twist rate for this cartridge is 177.8 mm (1 in 7 in.), 6 grooves right-hand twist, Ø lands = 5.56 millimetres (0.219 in), Ø grooves = 5.69 millimetres (0.224 in).

According to STANAG 4172 and the official NATO proofing guidelines, the 5.56×45mm NATO case can handle up to 420.0 MPa (60,916 psi) piezo service pressure. In NATO-regulated organizations, every rifle cartridge combination has to be proofed at 537.5 MPa (77,958 psi) to certify for service issue. STANAG 4172 defines the Belgian ball cartridge SS109 as the NATO reference cartridge and adds a considerable number of technical requirements like a minimum pressure of 88.0 MPa (12,763 psi) at the gas port 280 millimetres (11.0 in) down the 508 millimetres (20.0 in) long standard proof barrel and primer sensitivity that are not defined by civilian C.I.P. and SAAMI ammunition rulings and recommendations.

The NATO military alliance uses a NATO-specific recognized class of procedures to control the safety and quality of firearms ammunition called NATO EPVAT testing. The civilian organisations C.I.P. and SAAMI use less comprehensive test procedures than NATO. The NATO Manual of Proof and Inspection AC/225 (LG/3-SG/1) D/8 stipulates each weapon and component considered vulnerable to the effects of a rapid change in pressure, for example barrels, breech blocks and bolts, will be tested by firing one dry round at a corrected minimum of 25% over pressure and one oiled round at a corrected minimum of 25% over pressure. Over pressure of 25% means 25% in excess of the service pressure resulting from the 5.56×45mm NATO up to 430.0 MPa (62,366 psi) (P_{max}) piezo service pressure. The service pressure is defined as the mean pressure generated by the service cartridge at a temperature of 21 °C (70 °F). Such a high-pressure proof is conducted with both the weapon and ammunition conditioned to an ambient temperature of 21 °C (70 °F). Each weapon will be individually tested using an ammunition lot that meets a minimum corrected mean chamber pressure. The corrected proof pressure requirement (service pressure (P_{max}) + 25%) for the 5.56×45mm NATO like the STANAG 4172 is 537.3 MPa (77,929 psi) (PE) piezo pressure. This pressure has to be recorded in a NATO-design EPVAT barrel with Kistler 6215 transducer, HPI GP6 Transducer or by equipment to C.I.P. requirements.

The US SAAMI lists maximum average pressure (MAP) for the .223 Remington cartridge as 55,000 psi (379.2 MPa) piezo pressure with deviation of up to 58,000 psi (399.9 MPa).

== Rifle barrel configurations ==
When 5.56×45mm NATO was adopted as standard in 1980, NATO chose a 178 mm (1:7) rifling twist rate for the 5.56×45mm NATO chambering to adequately stabilize the relatively long NATO L110/M856 5.56×45mm NATO tracer projectile. The US at that time converted all rifles in inventory by replacing the barrels and all new US military rifles since have been manufactured with this ratio.

In the US, builders of AR-type rifles can specify barrels with either .223 Remington, .223 Wylde, 223 Noveske, or 5.56×45mm NATO chambers in lengths from pistol (7.5") to long rifle (24"). These barrels are also available with rifling ranging from 356 mm (1-in-14") to 178 mm (1-in-7"). US makers are moving toward 5.56×45mm NATO and 178 mm (1-in-7"), which will ensure the least liability. Those chambered for .223 Remington may not have a fast enough rifling to stabilize the longer 5.56×45mm NATO bullets, which range up to 77 gr. Some hunting loads of .223 Remington go to 90 grains.

== Performance ==
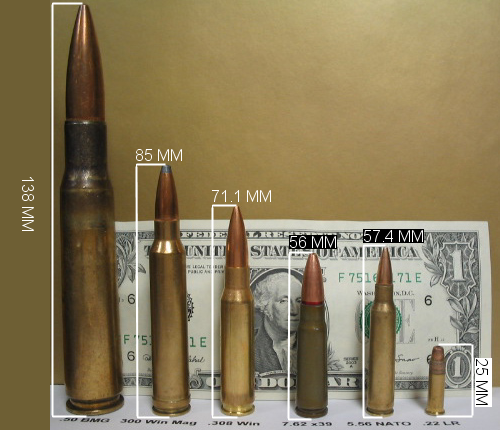
5.56mm NATO shown alongside other cartridges and a United States $1 bill

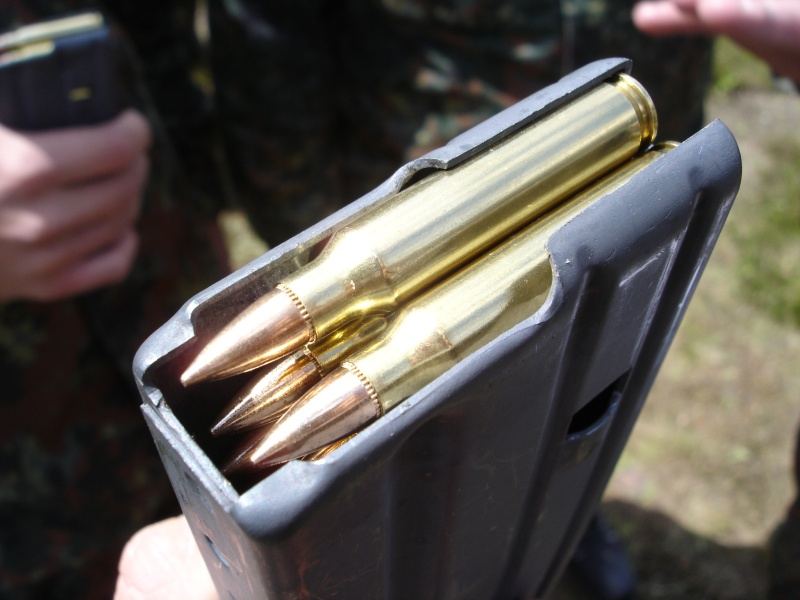
5.56×45mm NATO cartridges in a STANAG magazine

The 5.56×45mm NATO SS109/M855 cartridge (NATO: SS109; U.S.: M855) with standard 62 gr. lead core bullets with steel penetrator will penetrate about 38 to 51 cm (15 to 20 in) into soft tissue in ideal circumstances. As with all spitzer shaped projectiles, it is prone to yaw in soft tissue. However, at impact velocities above roughly 762 m/s (2,500 ft/s), it may yaw and then fragment at the cannelure (the crimping groove around the cylinder of the bullet). These fragments can disperse through flesh and bone, inflicting additional internal injuries.

Fragmentation, if and when it occurs, imparts much greater damage to human tissue than bullet dimensions and velocities would suggest. This fragmentation effect is highly dependent on velocity and therefore on barrel length: short-barreled carbines generate lower muzzle velocity and therefore lose wounding effectiveness at much shorter ranges than longer-barreled rifles.

Proponents of the hydrostatic shock theory contend that the shockwave from a high-velocity bullet results in wounding effects beyond the tissue directly crushed and torn by the bullet and fragments. However, others argue that tissue damage from hydrostatic shock is a myth. Critics argue that sonic pressure waves do not cause tissue disruption and that temporary cavity formation is the actual cause of tissue disruption mistakenly attributed to sonic pressure waves.

SS109/M855 NATO ball can penetrate up to 3 mm (0.12 in) of steel at 600 meters. According to Nammo, a Finnish-Norwegian ammunition producer, the 5.56×45mm NATO M995 armour piercing cartridge can penetrate up to 12 mm (0.47 in) of RHA steel at 100 meters.

The US Army's Ballistic Research Laboratory measured a ballistic coefficient (G7 BC) of 0.151 and form factor (G7 i) of 1.172 for the SS109/M855 ball projectile.

The Swedish military has measured the bullet velocities of SS109/M855 military cartridges at 4 m (13.1 ft) from the muzzle fired from differing barrel lengths.

Barrel length	SS109/M855 V_{4} bullet velocity	V_{4} velocity loss
210 mm (8.3 in)	723 m/s (2,372 ft/s)	41 m/s (135 ft/s)
240 mm (9.4 in)	764 m/s (2,507 ft/s)	32 m/s (105 ft/s)
270 mm (10.6 in)	796 m/s (2,612 ft/s)	29 m/s (95 ft/s)
300 mm (11.8 in)	825 m/s (2,707 ft/s)	18 m/s (59 ft/s)
330 mm (13.0 in)	843 m/s (2,766 ft/s)	23 m/s (75 ft/s)
360 mm (14.2 in)	866 m/s (2,841 ft/s)	12 m/s (39 ft/s)
390 mm (15.4 in)	878 m/s (2,881 ft/s)	14 m/s (46 ft/s)
420 mm (16.5 in)	892 m/s (2,927 ft/s)	14 m/s (46 ft/s)
450 mm (17.7 in)	906 m/s (2,972 ft/s)	9 m/s (30 ft/s)
480 mm (18.9 in)	915 m/s (3,002 ft/s)	7 m/s (23 ft/s)
508 mm (20.0 in)	922 m/s (3,025 ft/s)	-

=== Criticism ===
There has been much debate about the bullet's allegedly poor on-target performance regarding stopping power, lethality, and range. Some of this criticism has been used to advocate an intermediate-sized cartridge between the 5.56 and 7.62 NATO sizes while criticisms of poor barrier penetration and accuracy have been used to support the M855A1 EPR round. Arguably, the criticisms about range, accuracy, and lethality are related to the change in barrel length and twist between the M16 and M4. The earlier 5.56 rounds (the original M193) were optimized for a 20-inch (51 cm) barrel with a 1:12 twist. In 1980, STANAG 4172 defined the 5.56×45mm NATO chambering and its accompanying 1:7 twist rifling. The shorter 14.5-inch (37 cm) barrel of the M4 carbine (with a STANAG 4172 conform 1:7 twist and M855/SS109 5.56 rounds^) generates significantly lower muzzle velocity, reducing the likelihood that the bullet will upset (yaw, fragment, or expand) in the target and resulting in less significant wounds.

Combat operations the past few months have again highlighted terminal performance deficiencies with 5.56x45mm 62 gr. M855 FMJ. These problems have primarily been manifested as inadequate incapacitation of enemy forces despite their being hit multiple times by M855 bullets. These failures appear to be associated with the bullets exiting the body of the enemy soldier without yawing or fragmenting. This failure to yaw and fragment can be caused by reduced impact velocities, such as when fired from short-barreled weapons or at longer ranges. It can also occur when the bullets pass through only minimal tissue, such as a limb or the chest of a thin, malnourished individual, as the bullet may exit the body before it has a chance to yaw and fragment. In addition, bullets of the SS109/M855 type are manufactured by many countries in numerous production plants. However, all SS109/M855 types must be 62 gr. FMJ bullets with a steel penetrator in the nose have composition, jacket thickness, and relative weights of the jackets, penetrators, and cores that vary widely, as do the types and positions of the cannelures. Because of the significant differences in construction among bullets in the SS109/M855 category, terminal performance is quite variable, with differences observed in yaw, fragmentation, and penetration depths.

Wound profiles in ballistic gelatin
Note: images are not to same scale

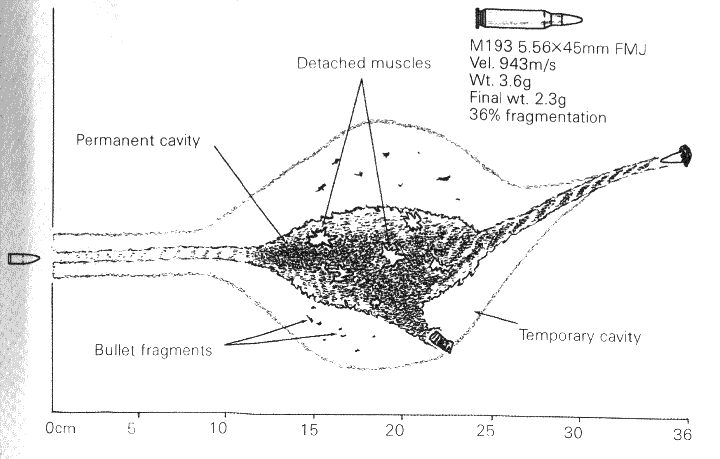
M16 M193 5.56×45mm

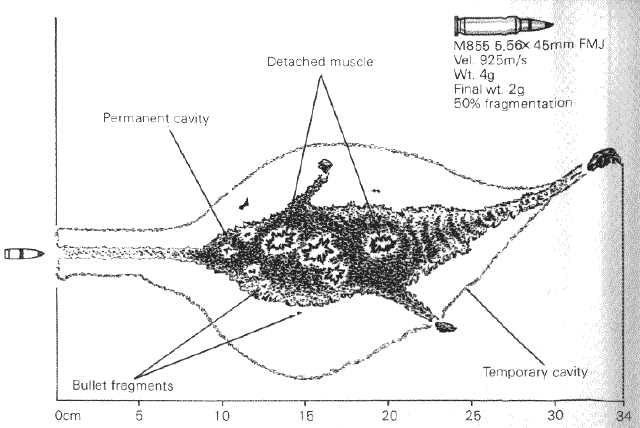
M16A2 SS109/M855 5.56×45mm NATO

If 5.56 mm bullets fail to upset (yaw, fragment, or deform) within tissue, the results are less significant wounds that may not cause adequate blood loss or damage to stop the target's attack or advances immediately. This is true for some 5.56×45mm FMJ bullets at extended ranges. As expected, with decreased wounding effects, rapid incapacitation is unlikely: enemy soldiers may continue to pose a threat to friendly forces, and violent suspects can remain a danger to law enforcement personnel and the public. Two other yaw issues: Angle-of-Attack (AOA) variations between different projectiles, even within the same lot of ammo, as well as Fleet Yaw variations between different rifles, were elucidated in 2006 by the Joint Service Wound Ballistic Integrated Product Team (JSWB-IPT), which included experts from the military law enforcement user community, trauma surgeons, aero ballisticians, weapon and munitions engineers, and other scientific specialists. These yaw issues were most noticeable at close ranges. They were more prevalent with certain calibers and bullet styles—the most susceptible being 5.56×45mm NATO FMJ ammunition like SS109/M855 and M193.

— Martin Fackler

The 5.56×45mm NATO standard SS109/M855 cartridge was designed for maximum performance when fired from a 508 mm (20.0 in) long barrel, as was the original 5.56 mm M193 cartridge. Experiments with longer length barrels up to 610 mm (24.0 in) resulted in no improvement or a decrease in muzzle velocities for the SS109/M855 cartridge. Shorter barrels produce a greater flash and noise signature, and adding a suppressor to a short-barreled AR family rifle can make it unreliable, as the reduced time for the propellant to burn in the barrel and the higher muzzle pressure at the suppressor entrance can cause faster cycling and feeding issues. Unless the gas port can be regulated or adjusted to higher pressures, suppressors for short-barreled 5.56×45mm NATO firearms must be larger and heavier than models for standard-length rifles to function reliably. SS109/M855 cartridges fired from barrels under about 254 mm (10.0 in) in length do not have enough muzzle velocity energy to cause extreme damage that occurs only at terminal velocities of over 750 m/s (2,500 ft/s) on impact, reducing the wounding capacity.

Compared to larger calibers, proponents of the 5.56×45mm NATO round contend that animal studies of the wounding effects of the 5.56×45mm NATO round versus the 7.62×39mm have found that the 5.56×45mm NATO round is more damaging, due to the post-impact behavior of the 5.56 mm projectile resulting in greater cavitation of soft tissues. The US Army contended in 2003 that the lack of close-range lethality of the 5.56×45mm NATO was more a matter of perception than fact. With controlled pairs and good shot placement to the head and chest, the target was usually defeated without issue. The majority of failures were due to hitting the target in non-vital areas, such as the extremities. However, a minority of failures occurred despite multiple chest hits.

Some have contended that shot placement is the most important factor in determining a bullet's lethality. Difficulty with the 5.56×45mm NATO at long ranges has been attributed to training; Swedish ISAF units relied on .50 BMG heavy machine guns for long-range shooting due to resilience to factors such as range and wind drift. Underperformance is thus attributed to errors in range and wind estimation, target lead, firing position, and stress under fire, all of which can be resolved through training.

=== Improvements ===
Advances have been made in 5.56 mm ammunition. The U.S. military had adopted for limited issue a 77-grain (5.0 g) "Match" bullet, type classified as the Mk 262. The heavy, lightly constructed bullet fragments more violently at short range and also has a longer fragmentation range. Originally designed for use in the Mk 12 SPR, the ammunition has found favor with special forces units who were seeking a more effective cartridge to fire from their M4A1 carbines. Commercially available loadings with these heavier (and longer) bullets can be prohibitively expensive, costing much more than military surplus ammunition. Additionally, these heavy-for-caliber loadings sacrifice some penetrative ability compared to the M855 round (which has a steel penetrator tip). The performance of 5.56×45mm military ammunition can generally be categorized as almost entirely dependent on velocity to wound effectively. Heavy OTM bullets enhance soft tissue wounding ability at the expense of hard-target/barrier penetration.

U.S. Special Forces had sought to create a round that had increased power out of carbine M4 barrels and compact SCAR-L barrels, while increasing hard target performance. Developmental efforts led to the creation of the Mk318. The bullet uses an open-tip design to inflict damage on soft tissue and has a brass rear to penetrate hard targets. The tip and lead core fragments consistently, even when using short barrels, while the rear moves through once the front impacts. It has more consistent performance because it is not yaw-dependent like the M855; the nose fragments upon impact and solid rear penetrator continues to move relatively straight. This makes the Mk318 effective against personnel with or without body armor. The round also increases accuracy, from 3–5 minute of angle (MOA) with the M855 from an M4A1 barrel to 1.71 MOA at 300 yards and 1.67 MOA at 600 yards from a 14 in (360 mm) SCAR-L barrel.

For general issues, the U.S. Army adopted the M855A1 round in 2010 to replace the M855. The primary reason was pressure to use non-lead bullets. The lead slug is replaced by a copper alloy slug in a reverse-drawn jacket, with a hardened steel penetrator extending beyond the jacket, reducing lead contamination to the environment. The M855A1 offers several improvements other than being lead-free. It is slightly more accurate, has better consistency in its effect on wounding ability, and has increased penetrating capability. The 62-grain (4.0 g) projectile can better penetrate steel, brick, concrete, and masonry walls, as well as body armor and sheet metal. It penetrates 3/8 in (9.5 mm) of mild steel at 350 meters, which the M855 can only do at 160 meters. The propellant burns faster, which decreases the muzzle flash and gives a higher muzzle velocity, an important feature when fired from a short-barreled M4 carbine. Although the M855A1 is more expensive to produce, its performance is considered to make up for it. One possible danger is that it generates much greater pressure in the chamber upon firing, reducing the service life of parts and increasing the risk of catastrophic failure of the weapon (though this has yet to occur).

The U.S. Marines adopted the Mk318 in early 2010 due to delays with the M855A1. This was a temporary measure until the M855A1 was available to them, which occurred in mid-2010, when the Army began receiving the rounds. Both the Mk318 and M855A1 weigh the same, have similar performance, and outperform the M855 against all targets. SOCOM spent less money developing the Mk318, and it is marginally better than the M855A1 in some situations, but costs more per round. The Army spent more developing the M855A1, which performs as well or nearly as well as the Mk318 but is cheaper per round and is lead-free. While SOCOM constantly seeks better equipment, the Army and Marines have far more troops to supply and buy more ammunition than SOCOM does.

=== Alternatives ===
If the 5.56 mm bullet is moving too slowly to reliably yaw, expand, or fragment on impact, the wound size and potential to incapacitate a person are greatly reduced. There have been numerous attempts to create an intermediate cartridge that addresses the complaints about 5.56 NATO's lack of stopping power, as well as the lack of controllability seen in rifles firing 7.62 NATO in full auto. Some alternative cartridges, such as the 300 AAC Blackout (7.62×35mm), prioritize penetration and stopping power at short ranges by sacrificing long-range performance. These calibers are designed to be interoperable with 5.56 by maintaining similar dimensions, allowing them to be used in a 5.56-chambered rifle with a simple barrel change.

By late 2004, the 6.8mm Remington SPC (6.8×43mm) was in limited use with U.S. Special Operators.However, it was not adopted for widespread use due to resistance from officials to changing calibers. In 2007, both the U.S. SOCOM and the U.S. Marine Corps decided not to field weapons chambered in 6.8×43mm due to logistical and cost issues.

In April 2022, the U.S. Army selected a new rifle and light machine gun as part of the Next Generation Squad Weapon Program. They will replace 5.56 mm weapons, being chambered in 6.8×51mm Fury that has greater accuracy and range while being more lethal than 5.56×45mm NATO and 7.62×51mm NATO against emerging threats.

== 5.56mm NATO versus .223 Remington ==
The exterior dimensions of the 5.56mm NATO and .223 Remington cartridges are identical. While the cartridges are identical other than powder load, the chamber leade, i.e., the area where the rifling begins, is cut to a sharper angle on some .223 commercial chambers. Because of this, a cartridge loaded to generate 5.56mm pressures in a 5.56mm chamber may develop pressures that exceed SAAMI limits when fired from a short-leade .223 Remington chamber. As the chambers differ, the head space gauges used for the two chamberings differ.

=== Brass case ===
The dimensional specifications of 5.56 NATO and .223 commercial brass cases are identical. The cases tend to have similar case capacities when measured, with variations chiefly due to brand, not to the 5.56 vs .223 designation. The result is that there is no such thing as "5.56 brass" or ".223 brass"; the differences between the cartridges lie in pressure ratings and chamber length, not in the shape or thickness of the brass.

In July 2012, the US Army requested vendors to supply alternative cartridge cases to reduce the weight of an M855A1 5.56 mm round by at least 10 percent, as well as for the 7.62 NATO and .50 BMG rounds. The cartridge cases must meet all performance requirements when fully assembled, be usable by the Lake City Army Ammunition Plant, and be manufactured in quantities totaling approximately 45 million per year. Polymer-cased ammunition is expected as a likely lightweight case technology. A hybrid polymer/metal version of a conventional cartridge case would be thicker than regular cases and reduce the amount of space for the propellant, although certain polymers could be thermodynamically more efficient and not lose energy to the case or chamber when fired.

=== Pressure ===
The pressure limits for .223 Rem and 5.56×45mm NATO are very similar, fired in their respectively designed chambers, if using similar measurement methodologies. Chamber pressures obtained using different methods are not comparable.

- The SAAMI sets the pressure limit for .223 Rem at 55,000 psi (379.21 MPa), using a chamber-conformal piston transducer. The US military uses a similar methodology (SCATP) and produced a very similar limit for their ammunition, at 380 MPa (55,114 psi), in the 1970s–80s. Early versions of NATO standards quote a very similar number.
  - On the other hand, Bryce Towsley quotes Jeff Hoffman from Black Hill Ammunition as saying that military cartridges can yield peak pressures in excess of 60,000 psi (413.69 MPa) in the SAAMI setup.
- The CIP sets the pressure limit for .223 Rem at 430 MPa (62,366 psi), using a drilled-case transducer.
- NATO EPVAT testing uses case-mouth transducer pressure.
  - The 2005 proof pressure for 5.56×45mm NATO is 537.5 MPa (77,958 psi), which, when divided by a factor of 1.25, yields the same maximum service pressure of 430 MPa (62,366 psi).
  - It is the current latest (2020) NATO AEP-97/AOP-4172 pressure testing method. NATO no longer gives a limit on the mean pressure, only a "mean + 3 standard deviations" limit of 445 MPa (64,542 psi). The "NATO Reference Ammunition" from the same publication has a mean pressure of 58,700 psi (404.72 MPa).

=== Chamber ===
The 5.56mm NATO chamber, known as a NATO or mil-spec chamber, has a longer leade, the distance between the mouth of the cartridge and the point where the rifling engages the bullet. The .223 Remington chamber, known as the SAAMI chamber, is allowed to have a shorter leade and is only required to be proof tested to the lower SAAMI chamber pressure. To address these issues, various proprietary chambers exist, such as the Wylde chamber (Rock River Arms) or the ArmaLite chamber, which are designed to handle both 5.56×45mm NATO and .223 Remington equally well. The leade of the .223 Remington minimum C.I.P. chamber also differs from the 5.56mm NATO chamber specification. The casings and chambers for .223 Remington and 5.56×45mm NATO are virtually the same dimensions. Still, because .223 Remington is designed to handle much lower pressures than 5.56×45mm NATO, the rounds are not completely interchangeable. Firing a 5.56×45mm NATO round out of a rifle chambered in .223 Remington could be injurious or fatal to the user as well as the gun, however .223 Remington ammunition can be fired safely from almost any rifle chambered in 5.56×45mm NATO as the NATO specified rifles can handle much higher chamber pressures than the .223 Remington is capable of producing.

Using commercial .223 Remington cartridges in a 5.56mm NATO-chambered rifle should work reliably, but until recently it was believed that it was less accurate than when fired from a .223 Remington-chambered gun due to the longer leade. Although that may have been true in the early 1960s when the two rounds were developed, recent testing has shown that rifles chambered in 5.56×45mm NATO can also fire .223 ammunition every bit as accurately as rifles chambered in .223 Remington, and the 5.56×45mm NATO chamber has the additional advantage of being able to fire both calibers safely.

Using 5.56×45mm NATO mil-spec cartridges (such as M855) in a .223 Remington-chambered rifle can lead to excessive wear and stress on the rifle and may even be unsafe, and SAAMI recommends against the practice. (More recent tests have failed to find any "dangerous pressure spike" when firing military ammunition in a .223 chamber.) Some commercial rifles marked as ".223 Remington" are in fact suited for 5.56×45mm NATO, such as many commercial AR-15 variants and the Ruger Mini-14 (marked ".223 cal", except the Mini-14 "Target" model, which only fires .223), but the manufacturer should always be consulted to verify that this is acceptable before attempting it, and signs of excessive pressure (such as flattening or gas staining of the primers) should be looked for in the initial testing with 5.56×45mm NATO ammunition.

The upper receiver (to which the barrel with its chamber is attached) and the lower receiver are entirely separate parts in AR-15 style rifles. If the lower receiver has either .223 or 5.56 stamped on it, it does not guarantee the upper assembly is rated for the same caliber, because the upper and the lower receiver in the same rifle can, and frequently do, come from different manufacturers, particularly with rifles sold to civilians or second-hand rifles that have been repaired with spare parts. Since all parts are interchangeable, a shooter must take great caution to check for markings of 5.56×45mm on the barrel before attempting to fire 5.56×45mm NATO ammunition out of it.

In more practical terms, as of 2010 most AR-15 parts suppliers engineer their complete upper assemblies (not to be confused with stripped uppers where the barrel is not included) to support both calibers to satisfy market demand and prevent any potential problems. Some manufacturers have begun offering a hybrid .223 Wylde chamber designed to support both cartridges optimally.

== Ammunition capacity for weight comparison ==
The first confrontations between the 7.62×39mm chambered AK-47 and the 7.62×51mm NATO cartridge M14 rifle came in the early part of the Vietnam War. Battlefield reports indicated that the M14 was uncontrollable in full-auto and that soldiers could not carry enough ammo to maintain fire superiority over the AK-47. A replacement was needed; as a result, the Army was forced to reconsider a 1957 request by General Willard G. Wyman, commander of the U.S. Continental Army Command (CONARC) to develop a .223 caliber (5.56 mm) select-fire rifle weighing 6 lbs (2.7 kg) when loaded with a 20-round magazine.

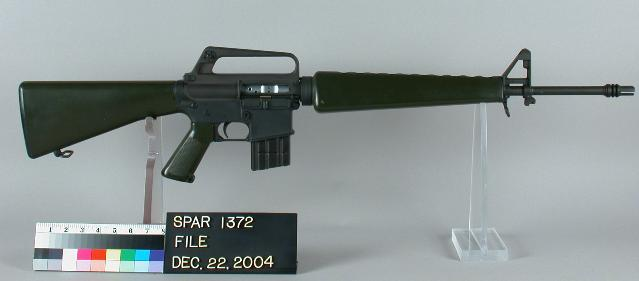
Colt ArmaLite AR-15 Model 01 with 20-round magazine

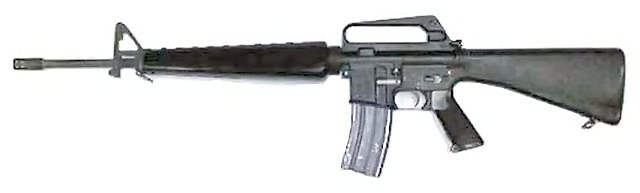
An M16A1 with 30-round magazine

This request ultimately led to the development of a scaled-down version of the Armalite AR-10, called the ArmaLite AR-15 rifle. During testing it was found that a 5- to 7-man team armed with ArmaLite AR-15s had the same firepower as an 11-man team armed with M14s. Also, soldiers armed with ArmaLite AR-15s could carry nearly three times more ammunition as those armed with M14s (649 rounds vs 220 rounds). The ArmaLite AR-15, officially designated Rifle, caliber 5.56 mm, M16, was later adopted by U.S. infantry forces as the standard-issue rifle.

The following table compares the maximum ammunition load a fire team can carry to support five similar rifles (measured in box magazines of 10 kg (22 lb)):

Rifle	Cartridge	Cartridge weight	Weight of loaded magazine	Max. 10 kilogram ammo load
AK-47 (1949)	7.62×39mm	252 gr (16.3 g)	30 rd mag at 819 g (1.806 lb)	12 mags at 9.83 kg (21.7 lb) for 360 rds
M14 (1959)	7.62×51mm NATO	393 gr (25.5 g)	20 rd mag at 750 g (1.65 lb)	13 mags at 9.75 kg (21.5 lb) for 260 rds
M16 (1962)	.223 Remington	183 gr (11.9 g)	20 rd mag at 320 g (0.71 lb)	31 mags at 9.92 kg (21.9 lb) for 620 rds
AK-74 (1974)	5.45×39mm	162 gr (10.5 g)	30 rd mag at 545 g (1.202 lb)	18 mags at 9.81 kg (21.6 lb) for 540 rds
M16A2 (1982)	5.56×45mm NATO	190 gr (12.3 g)	30 rd mag at 490 g (1.08 lb)	20 mags at 9.80 kg (21.6 lb) for 600 rds

== 5.56mm NATO versus 7.62mm NATO ==
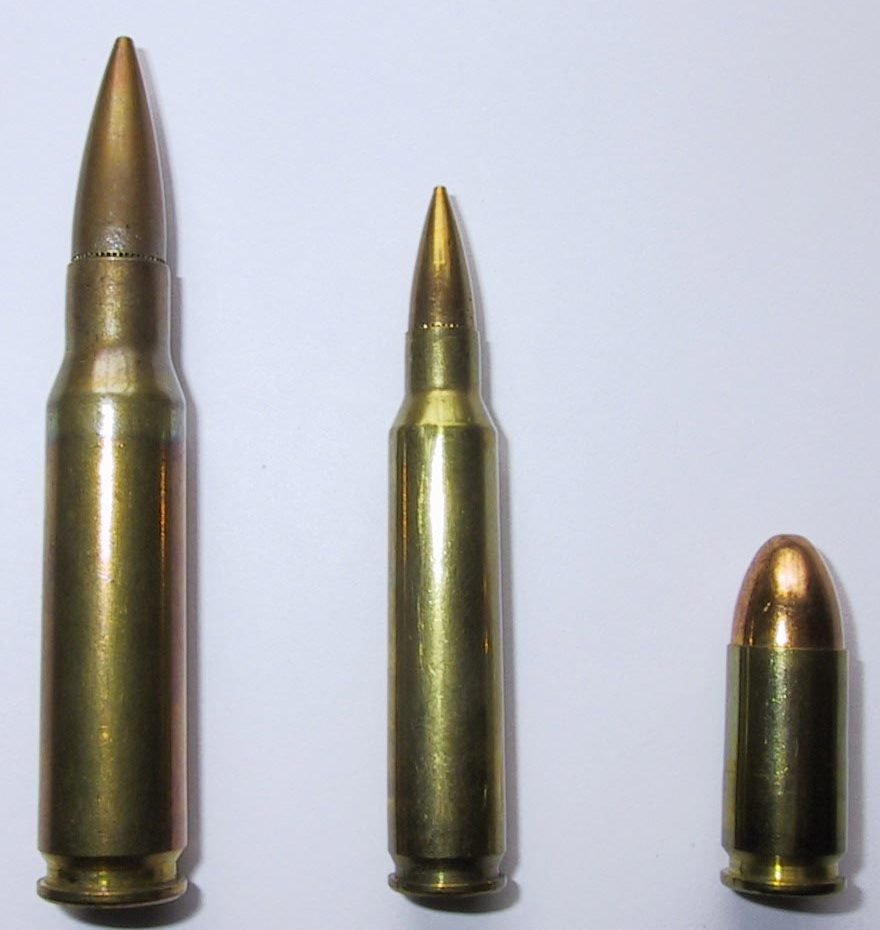
Comparison of 7.62mm NATO, 5.56mm NATO and 9mm Parabellum

Cartridge	Model	Cartridge size	Cartridge weight	Bullet weight	Velocity	Energy
5.56mm NATO	M855 5.56mm (5.56 × 45 mm) Ammunition	5.56×45mm	12.31 g (190 gr)	4.02 g (62 gr)	922 m/s (3,025 ft/s)	1,709 J
7.62mm NATO	M80 7.62mm (7.62×51mm) Ammunition	7.62×51mm	25.40 g (392 gr)	9.33 g (144 gr)	838 m/s (2,749 ft/s)	3,275 J

Hit probability refers to the ability of a soldier to concentrate on firing despite their weapon's recoil and noise, which is noticeably different between the two cartridges. The 7.62 NATO has twice the impact energy of the 5.56 NATO, preferable if a target is protected by higher-level armor, especially at "medium" range. If not, both rounds normally penetrate satisfactorily through enemies up to approximately 600 meters. A 5.56 NATO round fired from a 20 in (510 mm) barrel has a flatter trajectory than a 7.62 NATO round fired from a barrel of equal length, while the 5.56 NATO fired from a 14.5 in (370 mm) barrel has the same trajectory as the 7.62 NATO from a 20 in barrel, as well as the same time of flight. A 7.62 NATO round reaches 50 percent of its velocity within 80 mm (3.1 in) of the barrel when fired, so decreasing the barrel length for close quarters combat results in increased muzzle pressure and greater noise and muzzle flash.

== Military cartridges ==
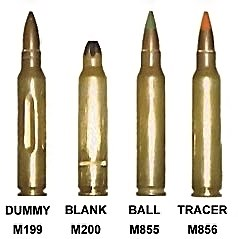
Images of U.S. 5.56×45mm NATO ammunition

=== Australia ===
Packaging configurations for M2A1-type ammunition boxes include 1,080 loose rounds, 900 rounds divided across eighteen plastic film packs containing fifty rounds each, 600 rounds in bandoliers containing 15-round charger clips, and 800 linked rounds divided across four 200-round belts each which can contain either a single ammunition nature or a mix of ammunition natures (e.g. four ball rounds followed by one tracer round).

Unless stated otherwise, all ammunition listed below is produced by Thales Australia. Since 2012, Thales Australia's ammunition production has been conducted via its Australian Munitions subsidiary.

- Cartridge, Ball, F1 (1985–present): FN SS109 equivalent produced by Australian Defence Industries (ADI) and then by Thales Australia.
- Cartridge, Ball, F1A1 [Green tip] (2010–present): FN SS109 equivalent with optimized projectile having a modified boat tail length and meplat diameter, redesigned case thickness, new primer cup design, and AR2210V01 propellant. The cartridge offers improved interoperability with foreign weapons (e.g., the AR-15 family) compared to the original F1, whilst retaining performance in the F88 rifle. Unlike the F1 cartridge, the F1A1 headstamp has a dimple at 3 o'clock and 9 o'clock. This is a hallmark of the automated SCAMP loading machinery used to make the new cartridges.
- Cartridge, Ball, F193: M193 equivalent.
- Close Target Round: Modified F1 ammunition allowing for indoor training to be conducted with unmodified weaponry and for outdoor CQB training to be conducted with reduced safety templates and more realistic stand-off ranges to targets up to 100 m. The ammunition is trajectory-matched to standard 5.56mm ball and uses a lead-free copper-polymer frangible projectile.
- Reduced Range Training Ammunition: Similar to the Close Target Round but trajectory-matching to standard 5.56mm ball extends to 300 metres.
- Cartridge, Tracer, M856: FN L110/US M856 equivalent.
- Cartridge, Blank, F3 [Crimped tip] (1985–1994; 1998–present): Blank cartridge produced by ADI and then by Thales Australia. Due to low demand, lots are produced only every 3 years. The cartridge uses a single-base propellant consisting of nitrocellulose with added stabiliser and ballistic moderants.
- Cartridge, Blank, F3A1: A version of the F3 cartridge with chemically blackened brass to aid in distinguishing the cartridge from live rounds.

=== Austria ===
- Round, 5.56mm Ball, M193: M193 equivalent produced by Hirtenberger Patronen

=== Belgium ===
- Cartridge, Ball, SS109: 5.56×45mm 61-grain (4.0 g) semi-armor-piercing cartridge with steel penetrator produced by Fabrique Nationale. Adopted in 1979 as the NATO standard.

=== Canada ===
- Cartridge, Ball, C77: 5.56×45mm FN SS109 equivalent used in the C7, C8 and C9 type weapons. Made by General Dynamics Canada.
- Cartridge, Tracer, C78: 5.56×45mm FN SS110 equivalent used in the C7, C8 and C9 type weapons. Made by General Dynamics Canada.
- Cartridge, Blank, C79 [Crimped tip]: 5.56×45mm blank cartridge used in the C7, C8 and C9 type weapons. Also made by General Dynamics Canada.

=== France ===
Ammunition made by GIAT.

- Type O (Ordinaire, "Standard" or "Ball"): A full-metal-jacketed lead-core bullet similar to the US M193. It was used with the FAMAS.
- Type T (Traçant, "Tracer"): A tracer bullet similar to the US M196.

=== Germany ===
- Patrone AA59, 5.56×45mm, DM11, Weichkern ("Soft-core", or Ball) [Green tip]: 5.56×45mm 4.1 g dual core ball cartridge with steel core, similar to M855/SS109, produced by RUAG Ammotec.
- Patrone, 5.56×45mm, DM11 A1, Weichkern [Green tip]: 5.56×45mm 4.0 g (62 gr) dual core ball cartridge with steel core, similar to M855/SS109, designed for and used by the German Bundeswehr with NATO approval (AC/225-125A), produced by Metallwerk Elisenhütte GmbH.
- Patrone, 5.56×45mm, DM18, Manöver ("Maneuver"): Blanks with brass base, produced by Metallwerk Elisenhütte GmbH.
- Patrone AA63, 5.56×45mm, DM21, Leuchtspur (Tracer) [Orange tip]: 5.56×45mm tracer complement to DM11, also produced by RUAG Ammotec.
- Patrone, 5.56×45mm, DM31, Hartkern ("Hard-core", or Armor Piercing): 5.56×45mm 4.0 g (62 gr) armor piercing cartridge with tungsten carbide core, produced by Metallwerk Elisenhütte GmbH.
- Patrone, 5.56×45mm, DM38, Übung ("Practice"): 5.56×45mm 0.5 g (7.72 gr) plastic training cartridge, plastic case cartridge colored light blue with a light 7.7-grain plastic bullet designed for short ranges with a dangerous space under 400 metres, produced by Metallwerk Elisenhütte GmbH.
- Patrone, 5.56×45mm, DM41 A1, Weichkern: 5.56×45mm 4.0 g (62 gr) FMJ cartridge, similar to M855/SS109 but without the steel penetrator tip, produced by Metallwerk Elisenhütte GmbH.
- Patrone, 5.56×45mm, DM51: 5.56×45mm 3.6 g (56 gr) deformation pure copper cartridge designed for high energy transfer to soft targets, produced by Metallwerk Elisenhütte GmbH.

=== Japan ===
- Cartridge, Ball, Type 89
- Cartridge, Ball, Type 89(C)
- Cartridge, Ball, Type 89(C), Linked
- J3 : 5.56×45mm bullet, weight 12 grams, made from steel and red brass, and uses a double-base powder, specifically made for Japan's new Type 20 rifle, which will replace the Type 89 rifle in Japan Ground Self Defence Force service.

=== South Africa ===
Packaging configurations for all ammunition natures c. 2010 consisted of a plastic 8217 box containing 2,700 rounds, divided across nine PVC bags of ten thirty-round cartons each, and a conventional M2A1 box containing 800 rounds, divided across forty twenty-round cartons each. For linked ammunition, configurations consisted of a plastic 7716 box containing 2,000 linked rounds, divided among five plastic 7815 cases of two 200-round belts each, and a conventional M2A1 box containing 800 linked rounds, divided among four 200-round belts each. Unless stated otherwise, all ammunition listed was or is produced by Pretoria Metal Pressings, which became a division of Denel upon the latter's formation in 1992.

- Round, 5.56×45mm, Ball, R1M1/M2: M193 equivalent with Boxer (R1M1) or Berdan (R1M2) primers produced from 1977 to 1983.
- Round, 5.56×45mm, Tracer, R1M1/M2: M196 equivalent produced from 1979 to 1983.
- Round, 5.56×45mm, Drill, R1M1/M2: Drill round produced from 1978 to 1983.
- Cartridge, 5.56×45mm, Blank, R1M1/M2: M200 equivalent produced from 1978 to 1983.
- Cartridge, 5.56×45mm, Rifle Grenade Launching, R1M1: Grenade-launching cartridge produced from 1979 to 1983.
- Round, 5.56×45mm, Proof, R1M1/M2: Proof round produced from 1979 to 1983, identifiable by honey colouring on the tip and base until 1982 when this was switched to yellow. A warmer round variation exists, which is identifiable by purple colouring on the tip, base, or both.
- Round, 5.56×45mm, Ball, M1A2/A3/A4: M193 equivalent with Berdan primers from 1983 onwards.
- Round, 5.56×45mm, Tracer, M2A2/A3/A4: M196 equivalent produced from 1983 onwards.
- Cartridge, 5.56×45mm, Blank, M4A2-A7: M200 equivalent produced from 1983 onwards.
- Cartridge, 5.56×45mm, Rifle Grenade Launching, M5A1/A2/A3: Grenade-launching cartridge produced from 1983 onwards.
- Round, 5.56×45mm, High Pressure Proof, M13A2/A3/A4: Proof round produced from 1983 onwards, identifiable by yellow colouring on the tip, base, or both. A warmer round variation exists with purple colouring.
- Round, 5.56×45mm, Drill, M14A2/A3/A4: Drill round produced from 1983 onwards.
- Round, 5.56×45mm, Ball, Manna: M1-type round with thin-walled jacket produced from 1986 onwards.
- Round, 5.56×45mm, Ball, M193: M193 equivalent produced for export sales.
- Round, 5.56×45mm, Ball, SS109/M855: FN SS109 equivalent produced for export sales.
- Round, 5.56×45mm, Tracer, M196: M196 equivalent produced for export sales.
- Cartridge, 5.56×45mm, Blank, M200: M200 equivalent produced for export sales.

=== Switzerland ===
- 5,6mm Gw Pat 90: The 63-grain 5.56×45mm Gewehrpatrone 90 / 5,6mm Gw Pat 90 ("5.6-mm Rifle Cartridge 90") is the Swiss Army's standard 5.56mm Ball round. It is optimized for use with the Sturmgewehr 90 service rifle, both of which were adopted in 1987. The Sturmgewehr 90 rifled barrel has 6 right-hand grooves and a Swiss Army specification 254 mm (1:10 in) rifling twist rate. A tombac-jacketed bullet and lead-free Boxer primer replaced the original cupronickel-plated steel-jacketed bullet and Berdan primer. Since 1997, most components of the round are made in Switzerland.

=== United Kingdom ===
Military ammunition is generally provided in H83 ammunition boxes containing 800 or 900 rounds, with these containing either cardboard cartons of twenty rounds each, cardboard cartons of thirty rounds each (900-round H83s only), or nylon bandoliers with five pockets containing three ten-round charger clips each for a total of 150 rounds per bandolier (900-round H83s only). In addition to these H83 configurations, blank rounds can come in wire-bound wooden boxes containing 1,000 rounds in twenty-round cartons. Linked ammunition is supplied in H83 boxes that contain belts of the desired quantity and link configuration (e.g. a 800-round box consisting of belts arranged in a sequence of four ball rounds followed by one tracer round).

- Round, 5.56mm Ball, M193: M193 equivalent produced by Radway Green (though some quantities of Hirtenberger Patronen-produced rounds were imported)
- Round, 5.56mm Ball, L2A1/A2: FN SS109 equivalent produced by Radway Green.
- Round, 5.56mm Ball, L3A1: M193 equivalent produced by Hirtenberger Patronen for use in AR-15 weapons and the HK 53 (L101A1/A2) rifle.
- Round, 5.56mm Ball, L7A1: Produced by Hirtenberger Patronen
- Round, 5.56mm Ball, L15A1/A2: FN SS109 equivalent produced by Radway Green, optimised for use in AR-15 weapons such as the L119A1/A2 rifle.
- Round, 5.56mm Ball, L17A1/A2: FN SS109 equivalent produced by Radway Green, optimised for use with SA80 weapons.
- Round, 5.56mm Ball, L21A1: FN SS109 equivalent produced by RUAG.
- Round, 5.56mm Ball, L31A1: New "Enhanced Performance" design produced by Radway Green since 2016, based on the FN SS109 round but featuring an all-steel bullet for improved penetration and giving similar performance in both AR-15 and SA80 weapons.
- Round, 5.56mm Tracer, L1A1/A2 [Red tip]: Tracer round complement to L2A1/A2, produced by Radway Green.
- Round, 5.56mm Tracer, L16A1 [Red tip]: Tracer round complement to L15A1/A2 and L17A1/A2, produced by Radway Green.
- Round, 5.56mm Tracer, L22A1 [Red tip]: Tracer round complement to L21A1, produced by RUAG.
- Round, 5.56mm IR Tracer, L26A1 [Red tip]: Infrared tracer round only visible through night vision devices.
- Round, 5.56mm Armour Piercing, L23A1
- Round, 5.56mm Reduced Range Low Penetration, L24A1
- Round, 5.56mm Close Quarter Training, L25A1
- Round, 5.56mm Marker Blue, L28A1
- Round, 5.56mm Marker Red, L29A1
- Cartridge, 5.56mm Blank, L1A1/A2/A3 [crimped tip]: Blank training round complement to L2A1/A2, produced by Radway Green.
- Cartridge, 5.56mm Blank, L8A1 [crimped tip]: Blank training round produced by DAG.
- Cartridge, 5.56mm Blank, L18A1 [crimped tip]: Blank training round complement to L17A1/A2, produced by Radway Green.
- Cartridge, 5.56mm Blank, L27A1 [crimped tip]: Blank training round optimised for feeding in the L119A1/A2 rifle.
- Round, Drill, L1A1 [chromed body]: 5.56×45mm inert training round, produced by Radway Green.

=== United States ===
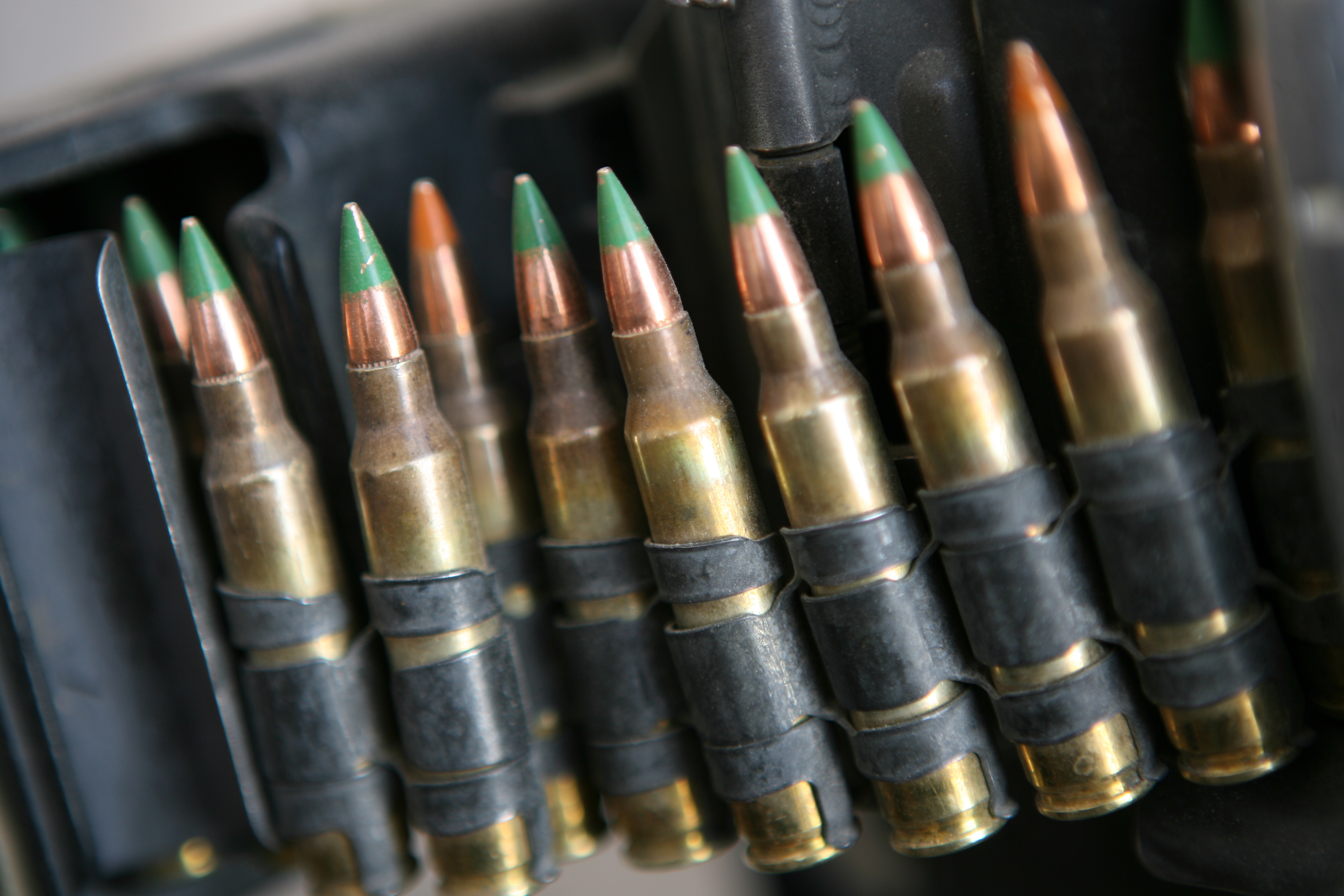
M855 and M856 cartridges in an ammunition belt using M27 disintegrating links

Military ammunition was packed exclusively in 20-round cartons from 1963 to 1966. In late 1966, the 10-round stripper clip and magazine-charging adapter were introduced, and ammunition began being packed in clips in bandoleers. Typical packaging configurations for M2A1-type ammunition boxes include 840 rounds of ball ammunition in ten-round stripper clips, 1,140 rounds of blank ammunition in cartons, and 800 linked rounds irrespective of ammunition natures. Typical wire-bound wooden box capacities include 1,680 rounds and 1,600 rounds.

==== US Army ====
- Cartridge, Caliber 5.56 mm, Ball, M193: 5.56×45mm 55-grain (3.6 g) ball cartridge. This was type-standardized and designated by the US Army in September 1963.
- Cartridge, Caliber 5.56 mm, Grenade, M195 [Crimped tip with Red lacquer seal]: 5.56×45mm high-pressure grenade-launching blank.
- Cartridge, Caliber 5.56 mm, Tracer, M196 [Red or Orange tip]: 5.56×45mm 54-grain (3.50 g) tracer cartridge.
- Cartridge, Caliber 5.56 mm, High Pressure Test (HPT), M197 [stannic-stained or nickel-plated case]: High-pressure Testing cartridge used when proofing weapons during manufacture, test, or repair.
- Cartridge, Caliber 5.56 mm, Dummy, M199 [No primer, Fluted case]: 5.56×45mm inert cartridge with fluted indentations in the case. Used for loading and unloading drills during basic training.
- Cartridge, Caliber 5.56 mm, Blank, M200 [Crimped tip with Violet lacquer seal]: 5.56×45mm training blank cartridge.
- Cartridge, Caliber 5.56 mm, Ball, M202: 5.56×45mm 58-grain (3.8 g) FN SSX822 cartridge.
- Cartridge, Caliber 5.56 mm, Dummy, M232 [No primer, Black-anodized case and bullet]: 5.56×45mm inert cartridge. Used for testing rifle mechanisms.
- Cartridge, Caliber 5.56 mm, Ball, XM287: 5.56×45mm 68-grain (4.4 g) ball cartridge produced by Industries Valcartier, Inc. An Improved version was also produced designated XM779.
- Cartridge, Caliber 5.56 mm, Tracer, XM288: 5.56×45mm 68-grain (4.4 g) tracer cartridge produced by Industries Valcartier, Inc. An Improved version was also produced designated XM780.
- Cartridge, Caliber 5.56 mm, Grenade, M755 [Crimped tip with Yellow lacquer seal]: 5.56×45mm grenade launching blank specifically for the 64mm M234 launcher. The original white lacquer seal was discontinued due to excessive bore fouling. Its design is otherwise an exact duplicate of the M195 Grenade cartridge.
- Cartridge, Caliber 5.56 mm, Ball, XM777: 5.56×45mm ball cartridge. An attempt to create a 55-grain SS109-style semi-armor-piercing round that weighed the same as the M193 and could use the same US-standard 1-in-12-inch rifling. It replaced the 6×45mm SAW round as the baseline cartridge for the Squad Automatic Weapon trials in the late 1970s and early 1980s.
- Cartridge, Caliber 5.56 mm, Tracer, XM778: 5.56×45mm tracer cartridge mated with the XM777 Semi-Armor-Piercing cartridge.
- Cartridge, Caliber 5.56 mm, Ball, M855 [Green tip]: 5.56×45mm 62-grain FN SS109-equivalent ball cartridge with a steel penetrator tip over a lead core in a full copper jacket. It is designed to penetrate lightly armored targets, such as body armor or light vehicles, and has a steel core that provides increased penetration.
- Cartridge, Caliber 5.56 mm, Ball, M855LF Lead Free [Green tip]: 62-grain (4.0 g) bullet with a steel penetrator tip over a tungsten-composite core in a full copper jacket. Primarily used during training in countries with strict lead disposal laws.
- Cartridge, Caliber 5.56 mm, Ball, M855A1 Enhanced Performance Round [unpainted steel penetrator tip] (2010–present): 62-grain (4.0 g) bullet with a 19-grain (1.2 g) steel penetrator tip over a copper alloy core in a partial copper jacket.
- Cartridge, Caliber 5.56 mm, Tracer, M856 [Orange tip]: 5.56×45mm 63.7-grain (4.13 g) FN L110 tracer cartridge. Provides red visible light and lacks a steel penetrator.
- Cartridge, Caliber 5.56 mm, Tracer, M856A1 [Red tip]: 5.56×45mm 56-grain Lead Free slug (LF) Tracer with similar ballistic performance to the M855A1 and improved 70 to 900 m (77 to 984 yd) visible trace to range consistency.
- Cartridge, Caliber 5.56 mm, Plastic, Practice, M862 [Brass primer, Aluminum case and Blue plastic projectile]: Short Range Training Ammo (SRTA) uses a light plastic bullet with a maximum range of just 250 meters. Because the M862 has less energy, the M2 training bolt must be used in the M16 Rifle / M4 Carbine for the weapon to cycle properly. The M2 training bolt and M862 cartridge case use a smaller-than-standard head diameter as a safety feature, preventing standard ammunition from being chambered or fired. The M862 SRTA is typically used for training on small, limited-size shooting ranges, such as near built-up or populated areas.
- Cartridge, Caliber 5.56 mm, Armor Piercing, M995 [Black tip]: 5.56×45mm 52-grain (3.4 g) AP cartridge with a tungsten core.
- Cartridge, Caliber 5.56 mm, Tracer, XM996 [Crimson tip]: So-called "Dim Tracer" with reduced effect primarily for use with night vision devices.

==== US Air Force ====
- Cartridge, Caliber 5.64 mm, Ball, MLU-26/P (Munition, Live, Unit #26 / Personnel use) (Federal Stock Number (FSN): 1305-968-5892, DOD Identification Code (DODIC): A066; assigned 1 January 1962): Early USAF designation for a 55-grain (3.6 g) 5.56×45mm FMJ Boat-Tailed ball cartridge produced by Remington-Union Metallic Cartridge Company. It was their designation for the commercial 55-grain .223 Remington M.C. ("Metallic-Cased", or Full Metal Jacketed) cartridge, which the Air Force initially designated "5.64 mm" (.222 caliber) rather than 5.56 mm (.218 caliber). The first order in 1963 (headstamped RA 63 or REM-UMC 63) consisted of 8.5 million rounds and was procured for testing, training, and unconventional warfare use with the XM16 rifle. The cartridges came packed unclipped in white 20-round commercial ammunition cartons, packed 36 cartons (720 rounds) per M2A1 ammo can, and shipped two M2A1 cans (1440 rounds in total) per wire-bound plywood crate. Until the Army adopted the M193 Ball round, this was the only type of military 5.56mm ammunition available in the Southeast Asia theater.

==== US Navy and US Marine Corps ====
- Cartridge, Caliber 5.56 mm, Frangible, MK 255 MOD 0 [White Tip]: 5.56×45mm 62-grain (4.0 g) Reduced Ricochet Limited Penetration (RRLP) round with copper/polymer composite core for training and operational use.
- Cartridge, Caliber 5.56 mm, Special Ball, Long Range, Mk 262 MOD 0/1: 5.56×45mm 77-grain (5.0 g) open-tipped match/hollow-point boat-tail cartridge. MOD 0 features a Sierra MatchKing bullet, while MOD 1 features either a Nosler or a Sierra bullet.
- Cartridge, 5.56×45mm, semi-jacketed Frangible, MK 311 MOD 0 : Reduced Ricochet Limited Penetration (R2LP) round, 50-grain (3.2 g) frangible bullet intended for training. Produced by Western Cartridge Company (headstamp: WCC).
- Cartridge, Caliber 5.56 mm Ball, Enhanced 5.56 mm Carbine, MK 318 MOD 0: 5.56×45mm 62-grain (4.0 g) Open-Tipped Match Boat-Tail cartridge. Optimized for use with 14-inch barreled weapons like the M4A1 Carbine and MK 16 SCAR and designed to penetrate light barriers like windshields or car doors with no loss of accuracy or damage. Since designated as Caliber 5.56 mm Ball, Carbine, Barrier.

=== SS109/M855 ===
In 1970, NATO decided to standardize a second rifle caliber. Tests were conducted from 1977 to 1980 using U.S. XM777 5.56 mm, Belgian SS109 5.56 mm, British 4.85×49mm, and German 4.7×33mm caseless. No weapon could be agreed upon, as many were prototypes, but the SS109 was found to be the best round and standardized on 28 October 1980. The SS109 was developed in the 1970s for the FN FNC rifle and the FN Minimi machine gun. To increase the Minimi's range, the round was designed to penetrate 3.5 mm of steel at 600 meters. The SS109 had a steel tip and lead rear and was not required to penetrate body armor. Barrels required at least a 1:9 in rifle twist, but needed a 1:7 in rifle twist to fire tracer ammunition. The U.S. designated the SS109 cartridge the M855 and first used it in the M16A2 rifle. The 62-grain (4.0 g) round was heavier than the previous 55-grain (3.6 g) M193. While the M855 has better armor-piercing ability, it is less likely to fragment upon hitting a soft target. This reduces the transfer of kinetic energy to the target and diminishes wounding capability. The M855 is yaw dependent, meaning it depends on the angle at which it hits the target. If at a good angle, the round turns as it enters soft tissue, breaking apart and transferring its energy to what it hits. If impacting at a bad angle, it could pass through without transferring its full energy. The SS109 was made to pierce steel helmets at long range from the Minimi, not improve terminal performance on soft tissue from rifles or carbines. In Iraq, troops that engaged insurgents at less than 150 yards (140 m) found that M855 rounds did not provide enough stopping power. In addition to not causing lethal effects with two or more rounds, they did not effectively penetrate vehicle windshields, even with many rounds fired at extremely close range. In Afghanistan, troops found that M855 rounds also suffered at long ranges. Although 5.56 mm rifles have an effective range of 450–600 meters, the M855 bullet's performance falls off sharply beyond 300 meters. The ranges are even shorter for short-barreled carbines. Half of small-arms attacks were launched from 300 to 900 meter ranges. An M855 fired from an M4 carbine has severely degraded performance beyond 150 meters.

The maximum effective point target range of an M4 carbine with M855 rounds is 500 m (547 yd), with a maximum effective area target range of 600 m (656 yd). These mark the greatest distances the rounds can be expected to accurately hit the target, not the ranges at which they have terminal effectiveness. Because the M855 is yaw dependent, it requires instability in flight to deform upon hitting the target. It is the most stable in flight between 150–350 m (164–383 yd), potentially lessening its effectiveness if it strikes an enemy between those distances. In addition to this, tests have shown that 5.56 mm bullets fragment most reliably when traveling faster than 2,500 ft/s (760 m/s). From full-length 20 in (508 mm) rifle and machine gun barrels, rounds exhibit velocities above 2,500 ft/s (760 m/s) out to 200 m (219 yd). An M855 fired from a shorter barreled M4 carbine exhibits a bullet velocity of 2,522 ft/s (769 m/s) at 150 m (164 yd) range. Even if it impacts at optimum speeds, 70 percent of 5.56 mm bullets will not begin to yaw until 4.7 in (120 mm) of tissue penetration. 15 percent more begin to yaw after that distance, so up to 85 percent of rounds that hit do not start to fragment until nearly 5 in of penetration. Against small-statured or thin combatants, the M855 has little chance of yawing before passing through cleanly and leaving a wound cavity no bigger than the bullet itself. The factors of impact angle and velocity, instability distance, and penetration before yaw reduce the round's predictable effectiveness considerably in combat situations.

=== M855A1 ===
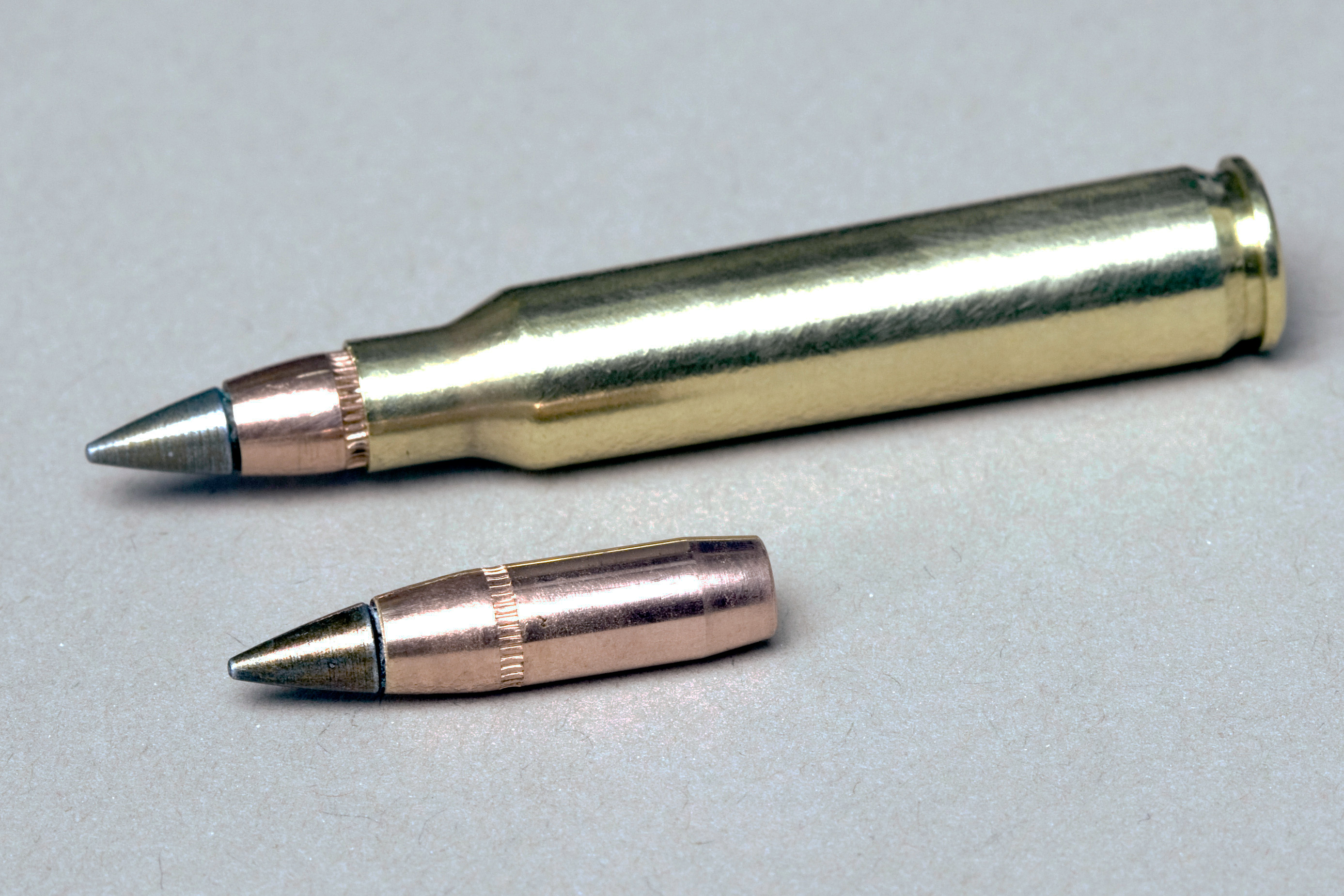
M855A1 Enhanced Performance Round and its environmentally friendly (lead-free) projectile

The M855A1 Enhanced Performance Round (EPR) was introduced in June 2010. It features a lead-free 62-grain (4.0 g) projectile with a solid copper core, and is tailored for use in rifles with shorter barrels such as the M4 carbine. It provides more consistent performance compared to the M855.

==== Deployment ====
On 24 June 2010, the United States Army announced that it had begun shipping its new 5.56 mm cartridge, the M855A1 Enhanced Performance Round (EPR), to active combat zones. During testing, the M855A1 performed better than M80 7.62×51mm NATO ball ammunition against certain types of targets (particularly hardened steel). However, this was due to the addition of a steel penetrator to the M855A1 projectile, compared to the standard lead-alloy core of the M80 projectile, and is not an accurate comparison between the two cartridges. The US Army Picatinny Arsenal stated that the new M855A1 offers improved hard-target capability, more consistent performance at all distances, enhanced reliability, improved accuracy, reduced muzzle flash, and higher velocity than the SS109/M855 round. Further, the Army stated that the new M855A1 ammunition is tailored for use in M4 carbines but should also deliver enhanced performance in M16 rifles and M249 light machine guns. The new 62-grain (4.0 g)-grain projectile used in the M855A1 round has a copper core with a 19-grain (1.2 g)-grain steel "stacked-cone" penetrating tip. The M855A1 cartridge is sometimes referred to as "green ammo" because it fires a lead free projectile. It is not necessarily more lethal than the SS109/M855, but performs more consistently every time it hits a soft target and retains its performance at longer distances. The EPR can penetrate a 3/8 in (9.5 mm) thick mild steel barrier from an M4 at 350 m (380 yd) and from an M16 at 400 m (440 yd). Compared to the SS109/M855 the M855A1 muzzle velocities are somewhat increased to 3,150 ft/s (960 m/s) (+37 ft/s (11 m/s)) for the M16 and 2,970 ft/s (910 m/s) (+54 ft/s (16 m/s)) for the M4 carbine. Ballistics for both rounds are similar and do not require weapons to be re-zeroed, but if they are the EPR can be slightly more accurate. The steel-tip penetrator of the M855A1 is noticeably separated from the bullet jacket and can spin, but this is part of the design and does not affect performance. The M855A1 costs only 5 cents more per round than the M855. The M855A1 bullet has a 1/8 in (3.2 mm) greater length than the SS109/M855. Because steel and copper are less dense than lead, the bullet is lengthened inside the case to achieve the same weight as its predecessor. The longer bullet and reverse-drawn jacket make it more stable and accurate in-flight. Its steel tip is exposed from the jacket and bronzed for corrosion resistance. The tip is serrated and larger than the M855's steel tip. The M855A1's bullet composition, improved aerodynamics, and higher proof pressures extend its effective range for penetration and terminal performance. While effectiveness at different ranges is increased, the M855A1 does not increase the effective ranges at which weapons are expected to hit their targets. The Enhanced Performance Round was made to nearly match the trajectory of the M855 to aid in training consistency—the SS109/M855 ballistic coefficient (G7 BC) of 0.151 was improved to 0.152 for the M855A1—but the ranges to get desired effects are greatly extended.

The United States Marine Corps purchased 1.8 million rounds in 2010, with plans to adopt the round to replace the interim MK318 SOST rounds used in Afghanistan when the M855A1 project was delayed. The Marine Corps plans to adopt the M855A1 round in 2018; although testing revealed it caused "some durability issues" with the Marines' M27 Infantry Automatic Rifle, the weapon is still "operationally suitable" when firing the round.

On a media day at Aberdeen Proving Ground on 4 May 2011, reports were given about the M855A1's performance in the field since it was issued 11 months earlier. One primary advantage given by the round is its consistent performance against soft targets. While the older SS109/M855 was yaw-dependent, which means its effectiveness depends on its yaw angle when it hits a target, the M855A1 delivers the same effectiveness in a soft target, no matter its yaw angle. The new SMP-842 propellant in the round burns quicker in the shorter M4 carbine barrel, ensuring less muzzle flash and greater muzzle velocity. The M855A1 was able to penetrate 3/8 inch (9.5 mm) of mild steel plate at 300 m (330 yd). The round even penetrated concrete masonry units, similar to cinder blocks, at 75 m (82 yd) from an M16 and at 50 m (55 yd) from an M4, which the M855 could not do at those ranges. Its accuracy is maintained and sometimes increased, as it was able to shoot a group 2 inches (51 mm) better at 600 m (660 yd). In February 2011, the M855A1 was used more than the M855, and approximately 30 million M855A1 rounds were fielded from June 2010 to May 2011.

The M855A1 was put to the test at the 2012 National Rifle Association's National High-Power Rifle Championship at Camp Perry, Ohio, in August 2012. The shooter for the Army was Rob Harbison, a contractor supporting small caliber ammunition capability development at Fort Benning Georgia. This was a special event for the Project Manager for Maneuver Ammunition Systems and the Army's Maneuver Center of Excellence, as it was an opportunity to showcase the Enhanced Performance Round's capabilities. With an M16 loaded with M855A1 ammo, Harbison fired a perfect 200 points in the Coast Guard Trophy Match, which is 20 shots fired from the sitting position at 200 yards, finishing 17th out of 365 competitors. He also scored a perfect 100 on the final string of ten shots during the Air Force Cup Trophy Match, fired at 600 yards from the prone position, which is 10 shots in a row within the 12-inch, 10-point ring at 600 yards with combat ammunition. Harbison was happy with the EPR's performance, with his scores showing that the Army's newest general-purpose round is accurate enough to go toe-to-toe with the best ammo available, whether bought or hand-loaded. Harbison even said, "I don't think I could have scored any higher if I [were] using match-grade competition ammunition." The M855A1 was not fired from 1:7 in rifled barrels used in standard Army rifles, but special Army Marksmanship Unit (AMU) match-grade 1:8 in rifled barrels, which produce more accurate results when firing 62-grain rounds.

From fielding in June 2010 to September 2012, Alliant Techsystems delivered over 350 million M855A1 Enhanced Performance Rounds.

Since its introduction, the M855A1 has been criticized for its St. Mark's SMP842 (former WC842) ball propellant, which has been shown to increase fouling of the gun barrel. Post-combat surveys have reported no issues with the EPR in combat. A series of tests found no significant difference in fouling between the old M855 and the M855A1. However, manufacturers have reported "severe degradation" of barrels in rifles using the M855A1 in tests. The Army attributes pressure and wear issues with the M855A1 to problems with the primer, which they claim to have addressed with a newly designed primer. It uses a modified four-pronged primer anvil for more reliable powder ignition, with a stab crimp rather than a circumferential crimp to better withstand the new load's higher chamber pressure, increased from 55,000 psi (379.2 MPa) to 62,000 psi (427.5 MPa). During Army carbine testing, the round caused "accelerated bolt wear" from higher chamber pressure and increased bore temperatures. Special Operator testing saw cracks appear on locking lugs and bolts at cam pin holes on average at 6,000 rounds, but sometimes as few as 3,000 rounds during intense automatic firing. Firing several thousand rounds at such high chamber pressures can degrade accuracy over time as parts wear out; these effects can be mitigated by using a round counter to track part service life. Weapons with barrel lengths shorter than the M4 firing the M855A1 also experience 50 percent higher pressures than a full-length M16 rifle barrel, which can cause port erosion that can boost the automatic fire rate, increasing the likelihood of jams.

From June 2010 to June 2013, the issuing of the M855A1 Enhanced Performance Round removed 1,994 metric tons of lead from the waste stream. 2.1 grams (32 gr) of lead are eliminated from each M855A1 projectile.

An independent 2024 study concludes the M855A1 chamber and port pressures were measured to be significantly over the relevant NATO standard – to which all 5.56×45mm NATO arms are designed for – in M16 and M4 small arms, causing problems in these ammunition specific "internal piston" system and the M27 IAR "external piston" system small arms platforms.

=== Mk 262 ===
The Mk 262 is a match-quality round manufactured by Black Hills Ammunition made originally for the Special Purpose Rifle (SPR). It uses a 77-grain (5.0 g) Sierra MatchKing bullet that is more effective at longer ranges than the standard issue M855 round.

In 1999, SOCOM requested Black Hills Ammunition to develop ammunition for the Mk 12 SPR that SOCOM was designing. For the rifle to be accurate out to 700 yards, Black Hills "militarized" a cartridge that used the Sierra 77-grain (5.0 g) OTM (Open Tip Match) projectile; it switched from a .223 Remington to 5.56 mm case, increased pressure loading, crimped and sealed the primer, and added a flash retardant to the powder. The Mk 262 MOD 0 was adopted in 2002. Issues came up in development, including reliability problems at different temperatures and when the weapon got dirty, and cycling issues in cold weather due to the slightly shorter SPR barrel compared to the full-length M16A2 barrel. The problems were addressed by using a slower-burning powder with a different pressure in the barrel, resulting in the Mk 262 MOD 1 in 2003. During the product improvement stage, the new propellant was found to be more heat-sensitive in weapon chambers during rapid firings, resulting in higher pressures and failure to extract. This was addressed with another powder blend with higher heat tolerance and improved brass. Also during the stage, Black Hills wanted the bullet to be given a cannelure, which had been previously rejected for fear it would affect accuracy. It was eventually added to ensure effective crimping and prevent the projectile from moving back into the case, causing a malfunction during auto-load feeding. Although the temperature-sensitive powder and new bullet changed specifications, the designation remained as the MOD 1.

According to US DoD sources, the Mk 262 round is capable of making kills at 700 meters. Ballistics tests found that the round caused "consistent initial yaw in soft tissue" between 3 and 4 inches at ranges from 15 feet to 300 meters. Apparently, it is superior to the standard M855 round when fired from an M4 or M16 rifle, increasing accuracy from 3–5 minutes of angle to 2 minutes of angle. It possesses superior stopping power and can extend engagements to up to 700 meters when fired from an 18-inch barrel. It appears that this round can drastically improve the performance of any AR-15 weapon chambered to 5.56 mm. Superior accuracy, wounding capacity, stopping power, and range have made this the preferred round of many special forces operators and a highly desirable replacement for the older, Belgian-designed 5.56×45mm SS109/M855 NATO round. In one engagement, a two-man special forces team reported 75 kills with 77 rounds. The Mk 262 has a higher ballistic coefficient than the M855 of (G1)0.362 / (G7)0.181, meaning it loses less velocity at long-range.

Black Hills also produces the MK262 Mod-1C for sale in the US civilian market under Product Code D556N9.

=== Mk 318 ===
Following early engagements in Afghanistan and Iraq, U.S. Special Operations Forces reported that M855 ammunition used in M4A1 rifles was ineffective. In 2005, the Pentagon issued a formal request to the ammunition industry for "enhanced" ammunition. The only business that responded was the Federal Cartridge Company, owned by Alliant Techsystems. Working with the Naval Surface Warfare Center Crane Division, the team created performance objectives for the new ammo: increased consistency from shot to shot regardless of temperature changes, accuracy out of an M4A1 better than 2 minute of angle (2 inches at 100 yards, 6.3 inches at 300 yards), increased stopping power after passing through "intermediate barriers" like walls and car windshields, increased performance and decreased muzzle flash out of shorter barrel FN SCAR rifles, and costs close to the M855. The prototypes were delivered to the government in August 2007. Increased velocity and decreased muzzle flash were accomplished by the type of powder used. The bullet's design was called the Open Tip Match Rear Penetrator (OTMRP). The front is an open tip backed by a lead core, while the rear half is solid brass. When the bullet hits a hard barrier, the front half of the bullet crushes against the barrier, breaking it so the penetrating half of the bullet can go through and hit the target. With the lead section penetrating the target and the brass section following, it was referred to as a "barrier blind" bullet.

Officially designated the MK 318 MOD 0 "Cartridge, Caliber 5.56mm Ball, Carbine, Barrier", and called SOST (Special Operations Science and Technology) ammunition, the 62-grain (4.0 g) bullet fragments consistently, even out of a 10.5 in barrel. The lead portion fragments in the first few inches of soft tissue, then the solid copper rear penetrates 18 in of tissue (as shown through ballistic gelatin) while tumbling. Out of a 14 in barrel, the Mk 318 has a muzzle velocity of 2,925 ft/s (892 m/s).

In February 2010, the U.S. Marine Corps adopted the Mk 318 for infantry use. To be fielded by an entire branch of the military, the round is classified as having an "open-tip" bullet, similar to the M118LR 7.62 NATO round. The SOST bullet uses a "reverse drawn" forming process. The base of the bullet is made first, the lead core is placed on top of it, and then the jacketing is pulled up around the lead core from bottom to tip. Conventional, and cheaper, bullets are made by drawing the jacket from the nose to an exposed lead base. The reverse-drawn technique leaves an open tip as a byproduct of the manufacturing process and is not specifically designed for expansion or to affect terminal ballistics. The Pentagon legally cleared the rounds for Marine use in late January. The Marines fielded the Mk318 gradually and in small numbers. Initial studies showed that insurgents hit by it suffered larger exit wounds, although information was limited. SOST rounds were used alongside M855 rounds in situations where the SOST would be more effective. In July 2010, the Marines purchased 1.8 million M855A1 Enhanced Performance Rounds, in addition to millions of Mk318 rounds in service, as part of its effort to replace its M855 ammo. As of May 2015, Marine combat units still deployed with a mixture of both SOST and M855 rounds.

As the issue of environmentally friendly ammo grew, the Marines sought to determine whether the Mk 318's lead could be replaced while still meeting specifications. They found that by replacing the lead with copper and slightly stretching the jacket around to crimp the nose even more, the bullet's ballistic coefficient increased. To avoid visual confusion with the Mk 262 round, the bullet was entirely nickel-plated for a silver color; the enhanced silver-colored copper jacketed, open tip match, 62-grain projectile was named the MK 318 MOD 1.

=== 5.6mm Gewehr Patrone 90 ===
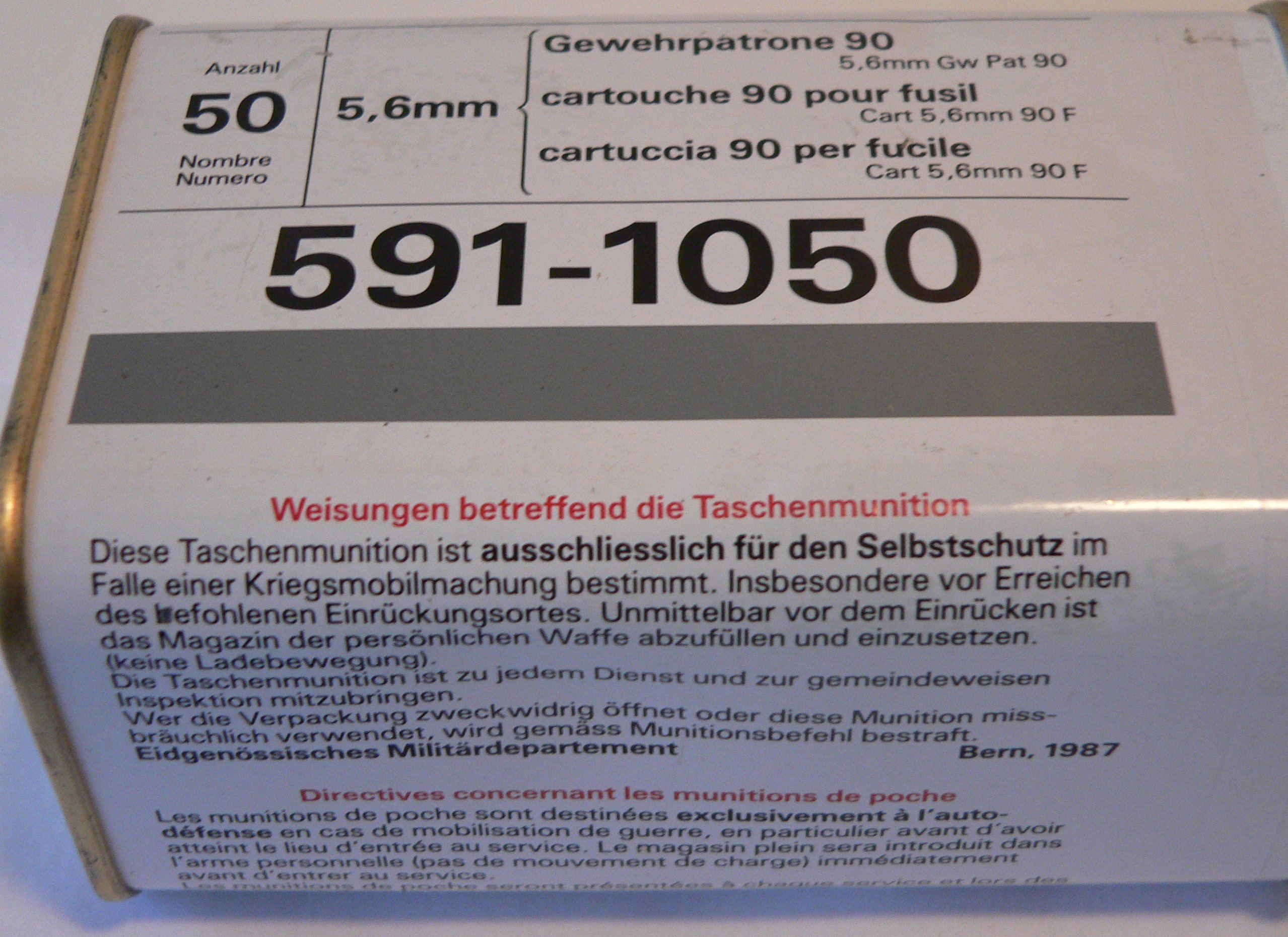
Ready ammunition of the Swiss Army. Soldiers equipped with the SIG 550 assault rifle used to be issued 50 rounds of ammunition in a sealed can, to be opened only upon alert and for use while en route to join their unit. This practice was stopped in 2007.

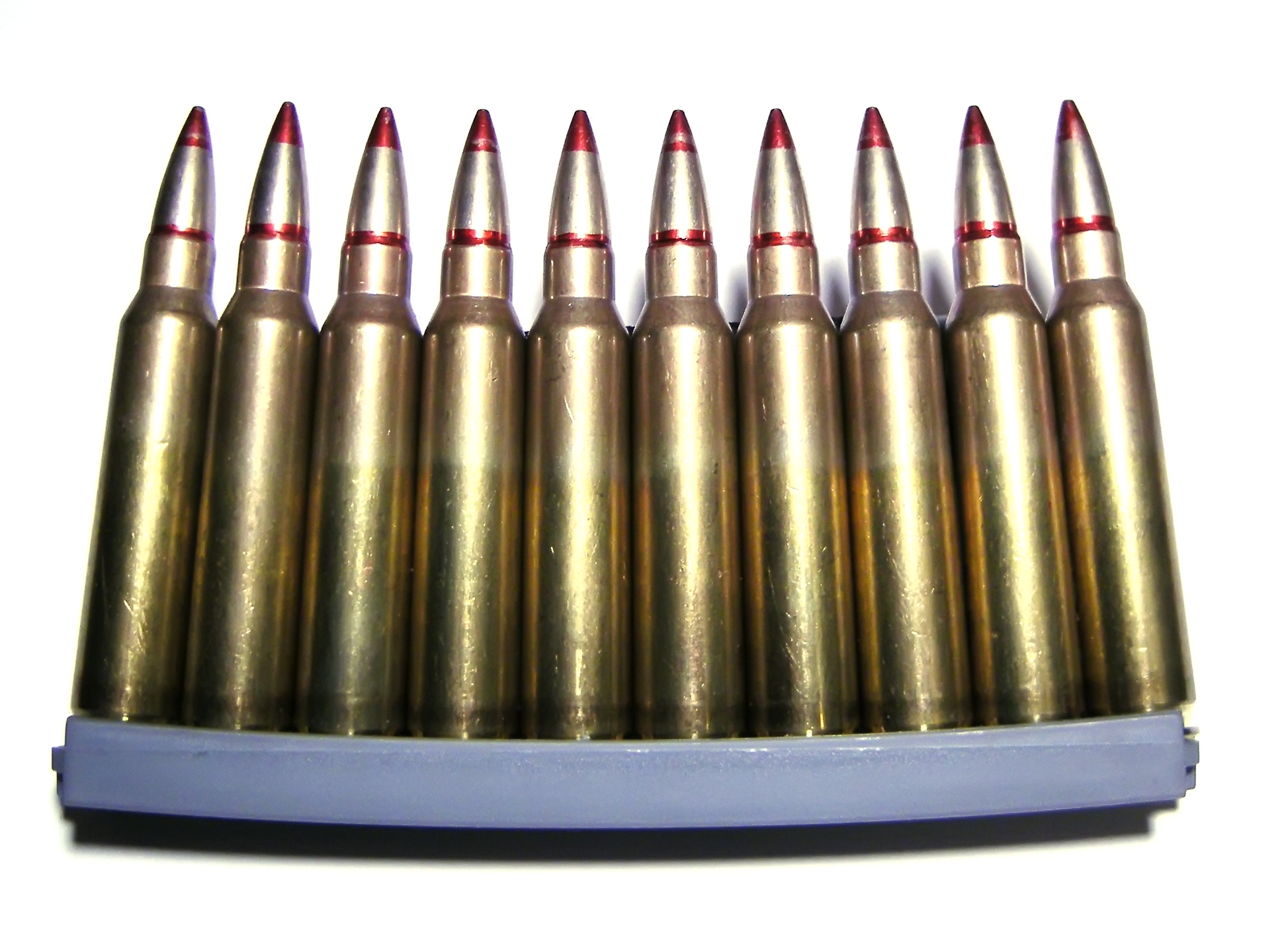
Swiss Army Gw Lsp Pat 90 tracer rounds

The 5.6mm Gewehr Patrone 90 or 5,6mm Gw Pat 90 (5.6 mm Rifle Cartridge 90), is the standard round used by the Swiss military in its rifle, the SIG SG 550. The cartridge is also known as the Cart 5,6mm 90 F (French: Cartouche pour Fusil / Italian: Cartuccia per Fucile) to the French- and Italian-speaking Swiss militiamen. The Swiss refer to the round as the 5.6 mm Gw Pat 90, although it is interchangeable with the 5.56×45mm NATO and .223 Remington round. The Gw Pat 90 round firing a 4.1-gram (63 gr) FMJ bullet is optimized for use in 5.56 mm (.223 in) caliber barrels with a 254 mm (1:10 in) twist rate.

The Gw Pat 90 was designed for the SIG SG 550 when it came into production in 1987, replacing the SIG SG 510. Previous experience with a change in standard rifle had proved that changing the firing distance for the training ranges was more expensive than designing a new ammunition; this prompted the design of a cartridge nominally capable of 300 meters. The cartridge was also designed to reduce pollution by controlling lead emissions. The bullet was originally clad with a nickel alloy jacket; however, this was found to cause excessive barrel wear, so in 1998 the nickel jackets were replaced with tombac jackets. In addition, in 1999, a copper plug was added to the base of the bullet to address environmental concerns.

As of 2009 the ammunition was produced by RUAG Ammotec, a subsidiary of the RUAG group. It is manufactured in three variations: the standard FMJ round, the tracer round, and a blank round.

The FMJ cartridge has a copper-zinc alloy case and uses a double-base propellant. The bullet is a 4.1-gram (63 gr) tombac jacketed FMJ projectile with a G1 ballistic coefficient of 0.331 (ICAO) / 0.337 (Army Metro). The projectile contains approximately 95% lead, 2% tin, 3% copper and was designed for terminal ballistic instability. The required accuracy for Gw Pat 90 ammunition out of factory test barrels is 63 mm (0.72 MOA) for 10 rounds (100% radius measurement method) out to 300 m. The Gw Pat 90 cartridge dimensions are in accordance with the civilian C.I.P. standards for the .223 Remington C.I.P. chambering.

The Gw Pat 90 is used both in the Swiss military and in sports shooting. The very high level of individual training in the Swiss militia (every single soldier bearing a weapon has to shoot to maintain his ability once a year; see Gun laws in Switzerland) and the overall use of the Gw Pat 90 by the many Swiss citizens who shoot in competitions and for amusement has resulted in significant input on its usage. Over 1 billion cartridges had been produced as of 2005.

== See also ==
- 5 mm caliber
- 6mm ARC
- Express (weaponry)
- List of 5.56×45mm NATO firearms
- List of rifle cartridges
- Table of handgun and rifle cartridges
