= SwissP Defence =

Ammunition manufacturer

SwissP Defence AG

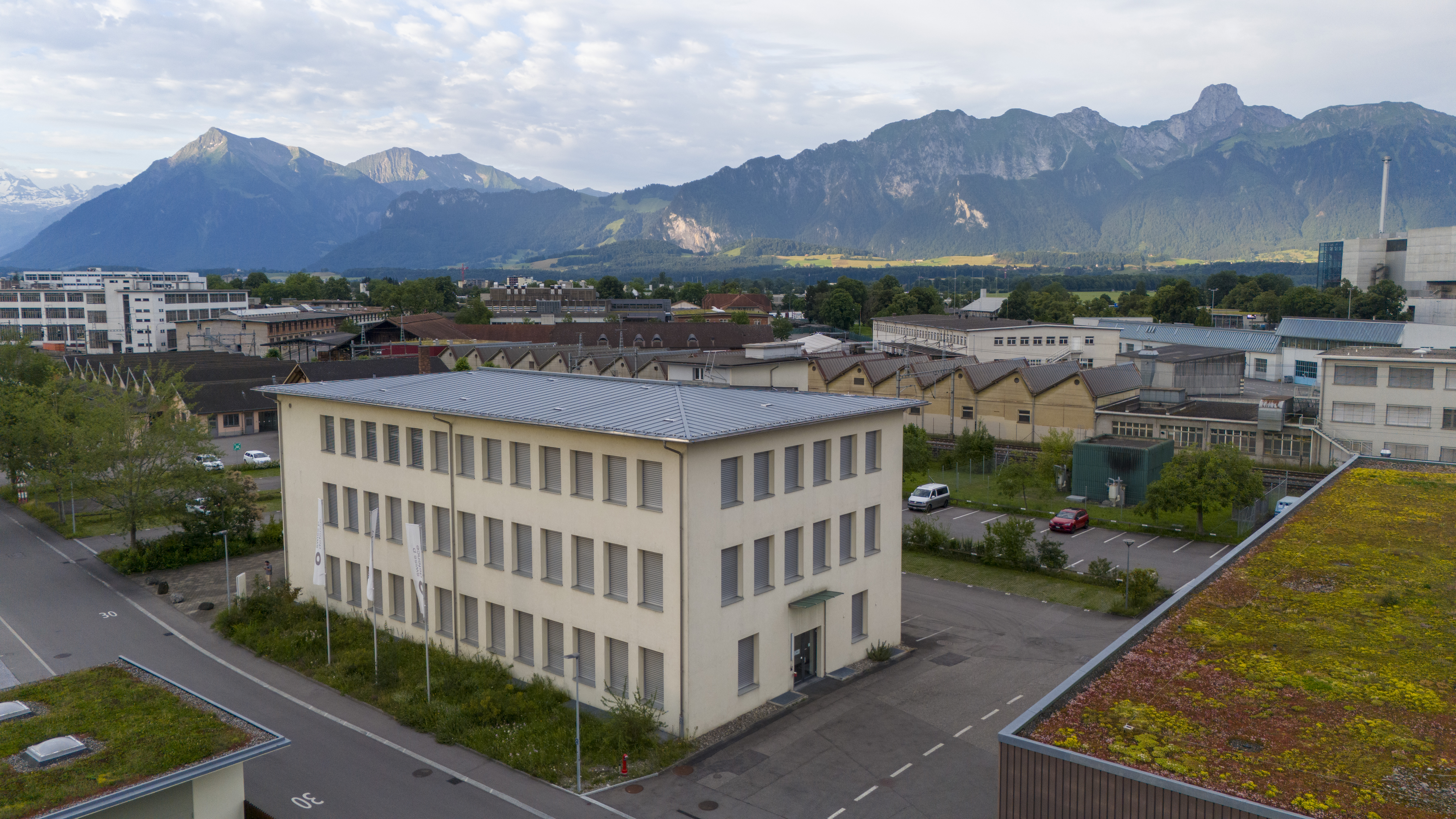
- Headquarters building
- Company type: Private
- Industry: Production of small caliber ammunition
- Founded: 1863 in Thun, Switzerland
- Founder: Hans Herzog
- Headquarters: Thun, Switzerland
- Area served: Worldwide
- Key people: Hannes Hauri (CEO)
- Revenue: CH₣ 111 million (2024)
- Number of employees: 360 (2024)
- Parent: Beretta Holding
- Website: swisspdefence.com

SwissP Defence AG is a Swiss manufacturer of small caliber ammunition. Based in Thun, the company is owned by Beretta and is the legal successor to the Eidgenössische Munitionsfabrik Thun (lit. 'Federal Munitions Factory Thun'). It gained its current name in 2022, when Beretta acquired the RUAG Ammotec division of the Swiss arms manufacturer RUAG.

== History ==
The roots of the ammunition company go back to the Steffisburg powder mill, which was founded in 1586. The actual history of SwissP Defence began in 1863, when Hans Herzog established the Federal Laboratory in Thun. From 1874 to 1995, the company operated under the name Eidgenössische Munitionsfabrik Thun. During World War I, up to 2050 people were employed by the company, and during World War II, up to 2400 and 2450 respectively.

After several mergers, the Thun-based ammunition manufacturer became part of RUAG's small-caliber division in 2002 and operated as RUAG Ammotec, which also included a German branch (today: RWS GmbH). Beretta acquired RUAG Ammotec in 2022. The Swiss branch has been called SwissP Defence since the end of 2022.

On 1 October 2024, Hannes Hauri became the new CEO of SwissP. Hauri was previously criticized by the Swiss Federal Audit Office for his role in a corruption scandal at RUAG. As the line manager of the employee who allegedly fraudulently sold Leopard 1 parts at below-market prices, Hauri warned the employee of anonymous accusations. Blick reported that internal company documents accused Hauri of "insufficient leadership and documentation", but noted that this seemed to have no impact on his career.

As part of the purchase of RUAG Ammotec, Beretta guaranteed to maintain the factory in Thun for at least five years. Two years later, in 2024, SwissP threatened to close the factory in Thun, citing increasingly restrictive export controls and falling orders from the Swiss Armed Forces. In response, the Swiss Federal Department of Defence increased its ammunition orders, despite aiming to cut procurement costs.

In March 2025, SwissP fired 22 employees. It is reportedly the only loss-making Beretta factory. The Tages-Anzeiger reported on the firings in the context of collapsing revenue among Swiss arms exporters due to strict export restrictions, especially in the aftermath of the 2022 Federal Council decision to bar the re-export of Swiss-made ammunition for the Gepard self-propelled anti-aircraft gun from Germany to Ukraine.

== Products and customers ==
The company's ammunition is marketed under the "SWISS P" brand. This is primarily ammunition for snipers. Bullet types are supplied in all common calibers. The company also offers system solutions for handguns. These include customized special weapons, silencers, optical sights and other accessories.

The SwissP's customers are armed forces and law enforcement authorities. In 2025, the Neue Zürcher Zeitung reported that SwissP had been developing a more powerful version of the GP 90, the standard ammunition of the Swiss Armed Forces, capable of penetrating bulletproof vests. It is unclear if the Swiss Armed Forces or NATO are interested in purchasing the new ammunition.
