= RUAG =

Swiss aerospace and defence company

RUAG Holding Ltd
- Type: State-owned Aktiengesellschaft
- Industry: Aerospace engineering and defence industry
- Predecessor: Eidgenössische Konstruktionswerkstätte; Eidgenössische Flugzeugwerke Emmen
- Founded: 1 January 1999; 27 years ago
- Headquarters: Bern, Bern-Mittelland, Bern, Switzerland
- Area served: Worldwide
- Key people: Dr. Remo Lütolf (Chairman); André Wall (CEO)
- Products: All kinds of technical products from ammunition to satellite equipment
- Revenue: ▲CH₣ 2,003 million (2019)
- Operating income: ▼CH₣ -7 million (2019)
- Net income: ▼CH₣ -25 million (2019)
- Owner: Swiss Confederation
- Number of employees: 9,091 (2019)
- Subsidiaries: RUAG MRO International; RUAG International
- Website: www.ruag.com

RUAG Holding (originally Rüstungsunternehmen Aktiengesellschaft; Armaments Companies JSC) is a Swiss company specialising in aerospace engineering and the defence industry. Its headquarters are located in Bern, while it also has numerous production sites in Switzerland (Nyon, Aigle, Thun, Bern, Emmen, Altdorf, Zürich and Interlaken), Germany (Oberpfaffenhofen, Hamburg, Wedel and Fürth), Sweden (Gothenburg, Linköping and Åmotfors), Austria (Vienna, Berndorf) and United States (Tampa and Titusville), and sales companies in Australia, UK, France, Belgium, Brazil and Malaysia.

== History ==
=== Background and initial years ===
During the 1990s, the government of Switzerland decided that the nation's military enterprises needed to be restructured, a view which led to the passing of the Federal Act on Federal Armaments Companies (FArmCA) in 1997. In accordance with this act, a new entity, known as RUAG Switzerland Ltd, was established to bring together four former state-run enterprises: SE Schweizerische Elektronikunternehmung AG, SF Schweizerische Unternehmung für Flugzeuge und Systeme AG, SM Schweizerische Munitionsunternehmung AG, and SW Schweizerische Unternehmung für Waffensysteme AG. Prior to this merger, these companies were comprehensively restructured with the intention of making them competitive commercial enterprises. RUAG formally commenced operations on 1 January 1999.

Even prior to its establishment, RUAG was confronted by a severe challenge in the form of dwindling orders from the Swiss Armed Forces due to post-Cold War defence cuts having greatly diminished military spending. Recognising its overdependence on the Swiss military, which initially accounted for 86 per cent of RUAG's sales, the company adopted a long-term strategy of diversification, progressively expanding its activities in the military and civil sectors both inside Switzerland and on the global market. This expansion went beyond only organic growth, necessitating numerous acquisitions, often focused in specific fields, such as aircraft and helicopter maintenance, repair and overhaul (MRO); command, information and communication systems; simulation and training systems; and small-calibre ammunition.

Positive results were soon achieved. During 2000, RUAG's Aerospace division reported 39 per cent growth in sales on the third-party market, which were generated from various programmes of aircraft manufacturers, including Airbus, Boeing and Pilatus. Other business included MRO services to foreign Northrop F-5 fighter aircraft, repair work on AIM-9 Sidewinder missiles for the United States Air Force and production of payload fairings for the US's Atlas V launch vehicle. RUAG's Land Systems division was also had optimism in the civilian sector, performing component assembly for injection moulding machines used in compact disc production. By the end of 2001, RUAG had reached a turning point, reporting 8 per cent overall growth for that financial year despite a sustained decline in the domestic defence sector; these gains were achieved upon the international market, particularly within the civilian sector.

RUAG was negatively impacted by the Great Recession that started during 2008, soon thereafter reporting a significant drop in orders from the civilian sector, particularly for aerostructures and MRO services, as well as its automotive and semiconductor interests. Consolidated profit was hit by CHF 160 million of write-downs, causing a negative EBIT of CHF 113 million – the first deficit recorded in RUAG's operational history. Around this time, RUAG made a strategic move into the space industry, which had been previously a tiny area of the business. In 2008, it acquired Saab Space and its subsidiary Austrian Aerospace; during the following year, RUAG also bought the Oerlikon Space AG, and subsequently created its RUAG Space division, Europe's largest independent space supplier.

=== 2010s ===
By 2010, RUAG's aviation division comprised three core areas: military MRO, business aviation, and special mission aircraft; of these, business aviation reportedly suffered a downturn following the Great Recession. The company made efforts to bolster its business aviation activities, focusing on providing MRO services to end users. In 2019, RUAG decided to sell its business aviation facilities in Geneva and Lugano to Dassault Aviation; the company stated that it was part of a strategic alignment, instead concentrating resources on its aerostructures and space programmes.

RUAG has progressively expanded the range of military aircraft that it provides MRO services for. During 2012, it competed against EADS to provide aircraft support services to the German military. In 2014, the company partnered with Finnish firm Patria to offer MRO services to McDonnell Douglas F/A-18 Hornet operators worldwide. During the 2010s, RUAG performed a major modernisation of the Swiss Air Force's Airbus Helicopters AS332 Super Puma helicopter fleet, and has subsequently promoted this capability for other operators.

During the 2010s, RUAG Aerostructures became a tier-one supplier of aircraft fuselage sections, wing components, flaps, and other elements for both civilian and military aircraft. It is a long-term supplier to aerospace giant Airbus, having delivered in excess of 9,000 Airbus A320 family fuselage sections by January 2020. On 19 December 2019, the two companies concluded a six-year arrangement for RUAG to manufacture the center fuselage section, flooring and side shells of the A320 at a rate of 60 sections per month at its plants in Oberpfaffenhofen, Germany; Eger, Hungary; and Emmen, Switzerland. In addition to its work for Airbus, other customers of RUAG Aerostructures include Boeing, Bombardier Aviation, Dassault Aviation, GE Aviation, Pilatus Aircraft, and Saab AB.

=== Dornier 228NG ===
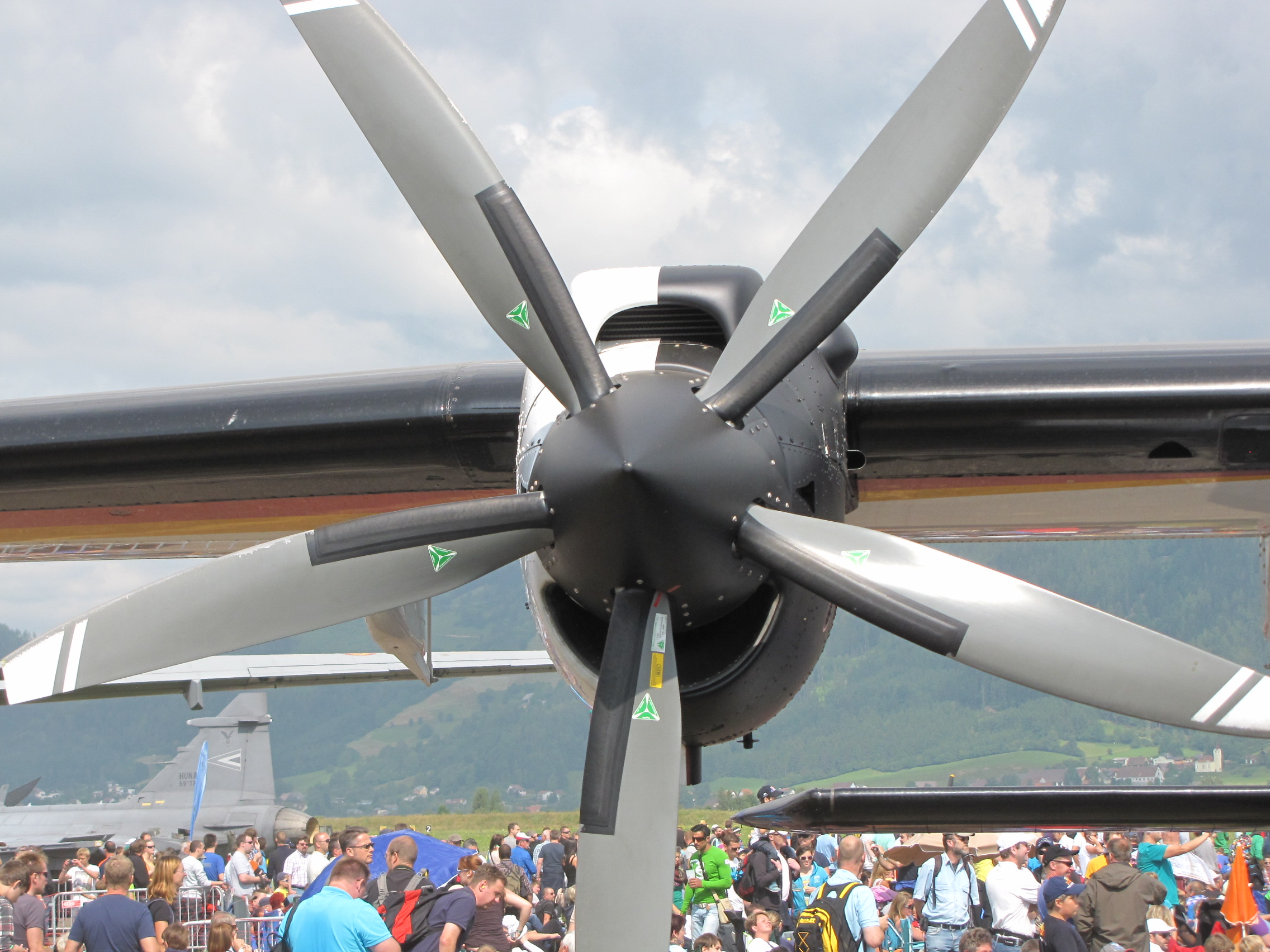
The main outside change of the 228NG is the five bladed propeller

During 2003, RUAG acquired the type certificate for the Dornier 228. In December 2007, RUAG announced its intention to launch a modernized version of the Dornier 228, which it designated as the Dornier 228 Next Generation, or Dornier 228 NG. At the 2008 Berlin Air Show, HAL agreed to supply the first three component sets — fuselage, wings and tail — for €5 million, as a part of an €80 million ($123 million) ten-year contract. Final assembly for the aircraft is performed in Germany; however, most airframe subassemblies, such as the wings, tail and fuselage, are produced by HAL in India. RUAG decided to suspend production of the Dornier 228 NG after the completion of an initial batch of eight aircraft in 2013. In 2014, RUAG and Tata Group signed an agreement for the latter to become a key supplier of the program. Production was restarted in 2015, with deliveries of four per year planned from 2016. the assembly line is reportedly capable of producing a maximum of 12 aircraft per year.

== Structure ==
The RUAG has the following operational divisions:

=== Aerospace ===
- RUAG Aerostructures (component manufacturing, aerostructures and recycling with products mainly for the civil market)
- Beyond Gravity (space oriented component manufacturing)
- RUAG Aviation (MRO for civil and military use, producer of the Dornier 228 NG, system solutions)

=== Defence ===
- RUAG Ammotec (small arms ammunition up to 12.7 mm for defence, law enforcement, hunting and sport). RUAG is also the original producer of the HG 85. Producing subsidiaries are located in Germany, Hungary, USA and Sweden. The products for the civil market are branded under the names RWS, Geco, Rottweil, Norma and Gyttorp. In August 2022, RUAG Ammotec was purchased by Beretta Holding and renamed SwissP Defence.
- RUAG Defence (Combat and support vehicle maintenance, simulation and training, network enabled operations, cyber security). Production in Switzerland and Germany.

== Products ==
=== Weapon systems and armoured vehicles ===
- RUAG Cobra
- Pionierpanzer AEV3 Kodiak, an armoured engineer vehicle developed in collaboration with Rheinmetall.
- Tactical communication systems.
  - RUAG ARANEA SECURITY CORE (includes software, hardware and tools)
  - RUAG ARANEA BPS PLATFORM (includes software, hardware and tools)
  - RUAG miFAP (Multinational interoperabler Funkanschaltpunkt), German Army, an interoperable radio interconnection point for NATO, to serve as a hub.
- Container systems:
  - Command and control systems.
  - Mobile medical containers.
  - Support systems.
  - Container buildings.

=== Simulators ===
- STES (Simulateurs de Tir d'Equipage et de Section), French Army, 48 crew training simulators for the VBCI supplied in collaboration with GAVAP.
- SIMUG, Swiss Army, live simulation platform in Bure.
- SIM KIUG, Swiss Army, live simulation platform in Walenstadt/St. Luzisteig.
- LASSIM RadSpz93, Swiss Army, a laser-based firing simulators used with the Piranha II 8×8 (RadSpz93).

=== Armour ===
The RUAG armour systems and their clients are listed below.

- Side armour:
  - SidePRO ATR, a heavy passive side protection against APFSDS, anti-tank guided missiles and explosively formed penetrator.
  - SidePRO RPG, a light and thin side protection against RPG.
  - SidePRO-KE, enabling protection up to STANAG 4569 Level 6 (frontal and side armour for IFV and heavy APC).
  - SidePRO-LASSO (Light Armour System against Shaped Ordnance), a slat armour system protecting against RPG.
- Roof armour:
  - RoofPRO, protects against sub-munitions from mortars and artillery systems, and artillery fragments. It reduces the IR signature as well.
- Mine armour:
  - MinePRO: available for different vehicle types with different armour requirements, can be an add-on, or can need a vehicle redesign.
- Users of RUAG armour:
  - CV9035 Mk III, Royal Netherlands Army, equipped from its purchase with the RoofPRO (entire fleet), and 100 kits of the SidePRO-KE.
  - M113G3DK, Danish Army, contract in September 2008 to equip 40 vehicles for Afghanistan.
  - KTO Rosomak M1M, using the SidePRO-LASSO in Afghanistan.
  - Pandur I 6×6, Belgian Land Component, upgraded with the SidePRO-KE and the MinePRO.
  - Pandur I 6×6, Austrian Army, upgraded with the SidePRO-KE and the MinePRO.
  - Pandur I 6×6 EVO Austrian Army, the new generation of the Pandur I was equipped with a MinePRO armour.
  - Sisu XA188, Estonian Army, contract autumn 2012.
  - SKOV Svarun 8×8 (Slovenian Patria AMV, first batch), Slovenian Army, contract in autumn 2012.
- Demonstrators:
  - VBCI equipped with a combination of the SidePRO RPG and in collaboration with the DGA.
  - Mowag Eagle IV and Mowag Eagle V equipped with the SidePRO-LASSO.
  - M113 equipped with the SidePRO RPG.
