= PC-7 Team =

SWISS AIR FORCE PC-7 TEAM
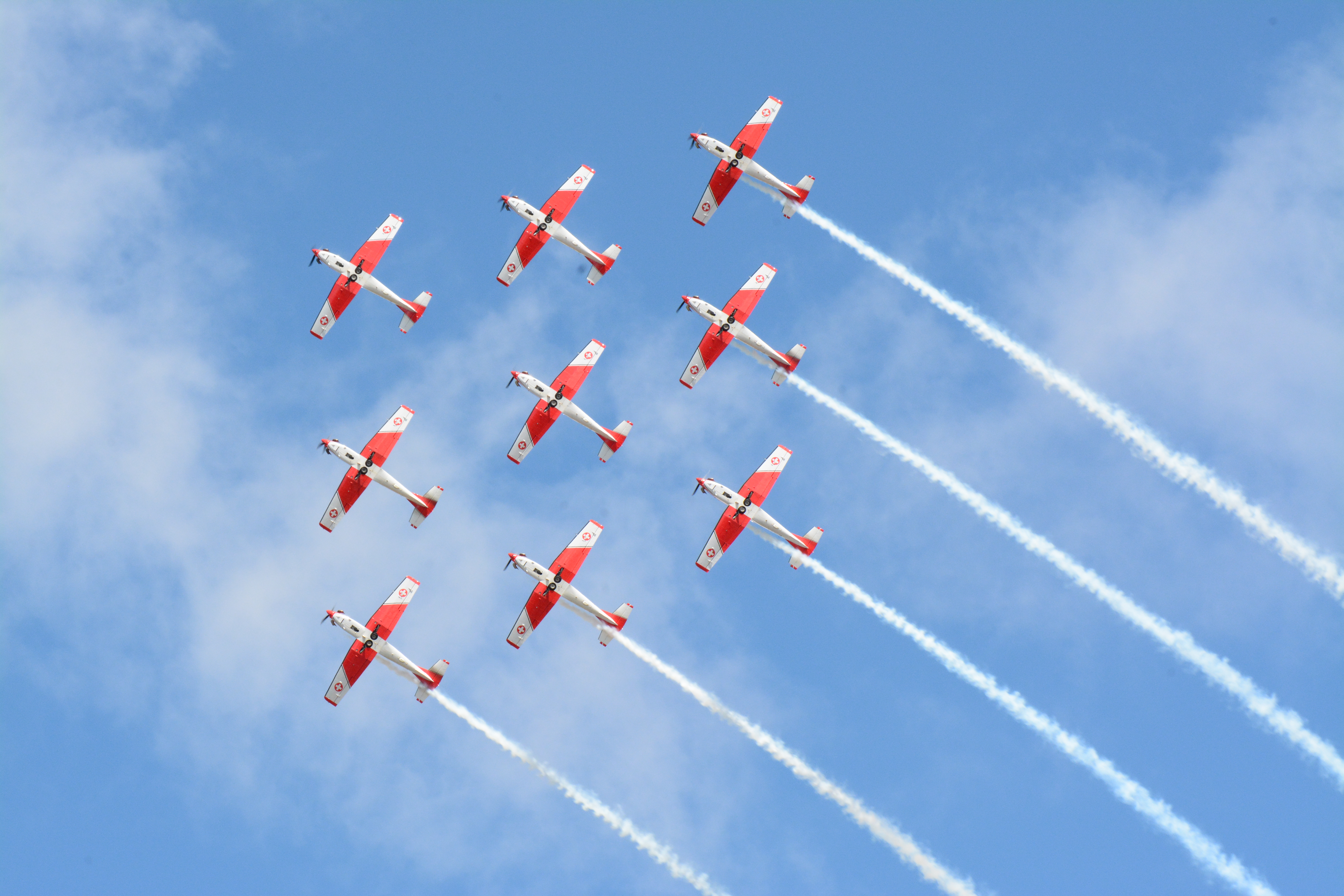
- Active: 1989 – present
- Country: Switzerland
- Branch: Swiss Air Force
- Role: Aerobatic team
- Size: 9 aircraft
- Colors: Red, white

Aircraft flown
- Trainer: Pilatus PC-7

The PC-7 Team is an aerobatics team of the Swiss Air Force. It derives its name from the Pilatus PC-7 trainer, the TEAM's primary aircraft. The PC-7 TEAM's homebase is Dübendorf Air Base, but they often operate from Militärflugplatz Emmen or Locarno Airport.

== History ==
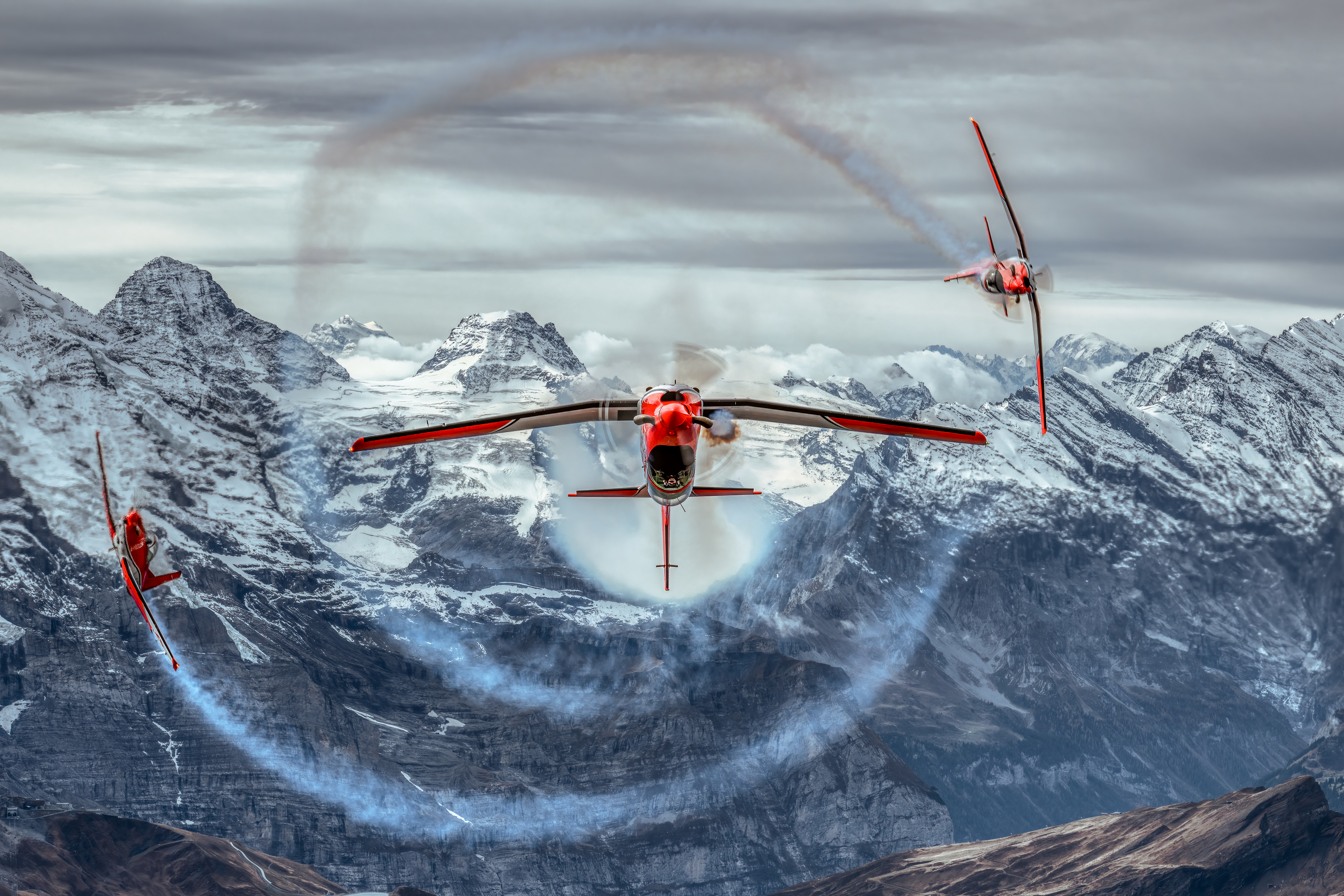
Double Flirt with Smoke

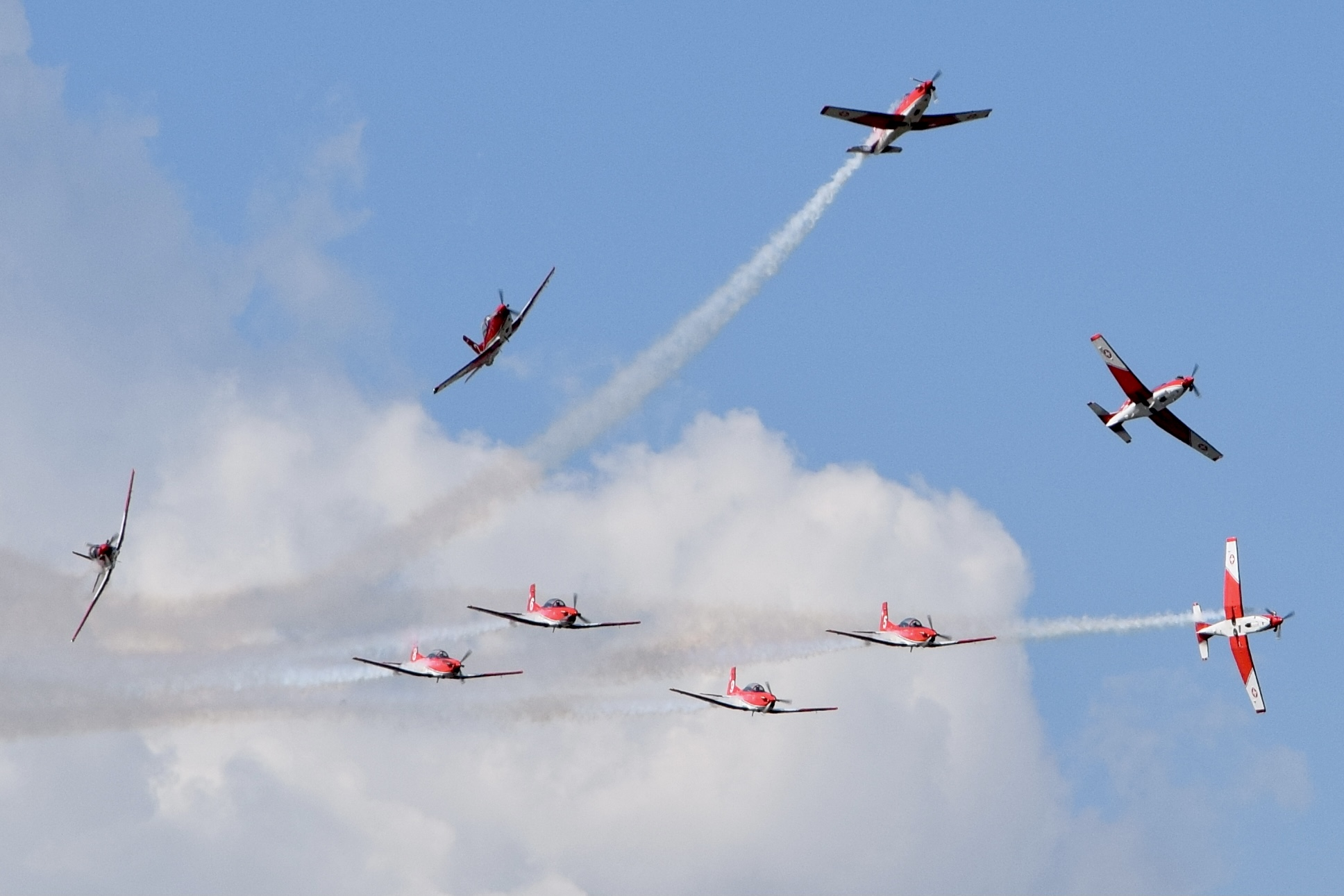
The Final Split, called "Grande"

Soon after the PC-7 was introduced in 1982, the Swiss Air Force started to present the new airplane in solo displays. The first public team display was in 1987, performed by an ad-hoc team of nine volunteer pilots. When the Swiss Air Force celebrated its 75th anniversary in 1989, the PC-7 Team was officially established. Since then, it has been performing in Switzerland several times a year, and since 1992 also occasionally abroad.

Since its establishment the team has flown the Pilatus PC-7 Turbo Trainer. In October 2006, it was replaced by the NCPC-7, which is a PC-7 equipped with a new cockpit. The PC-7 Team currently flies nine Pilatus PC-7 in the standard configuration of the Swiss Air Force's PC-7. The PC-7 Team still uses the unique Swiss Air Force Bambini-Code for its radio communication.

All pilots of the PC-7 Team are full-time military pilots and usually fly the F/A-18. The show program is made from 23 different elements. In 2014 seven aircraft were fitted with smoke generators. They were publicly used for the first time on 1 August 2014 at Buochs Airport at the roll-out of the Pilatus PC-24. The smoke system was built and financed by the company Pilatus Aircraft. Currently seven smoking systems are available which can be mounted in the luggage compartment of the PC-7. The diesel-oil mixture is injected into the right exhaust of the PC-7.

== The TEAM ==
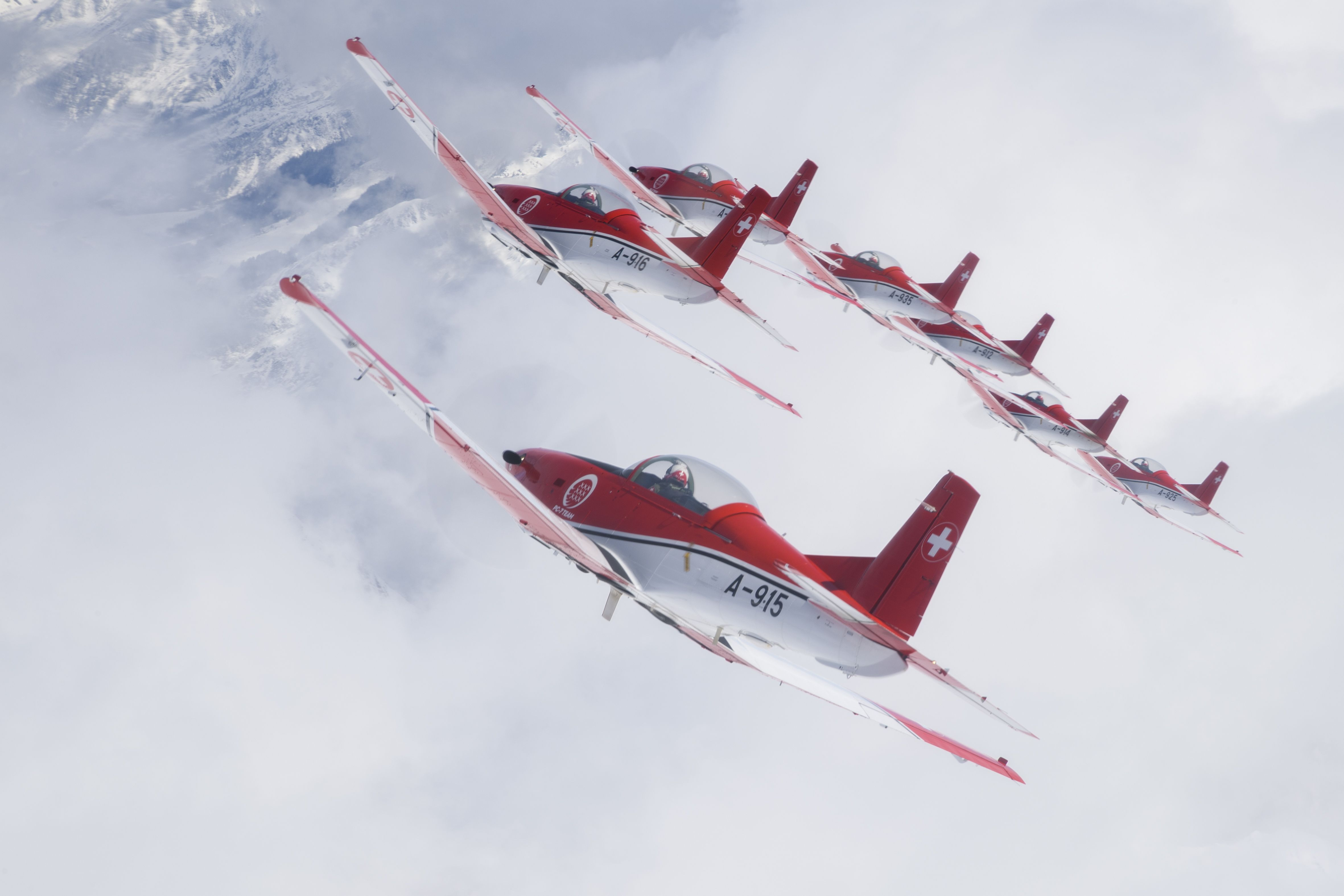
Join-up in the formation "Echelon"

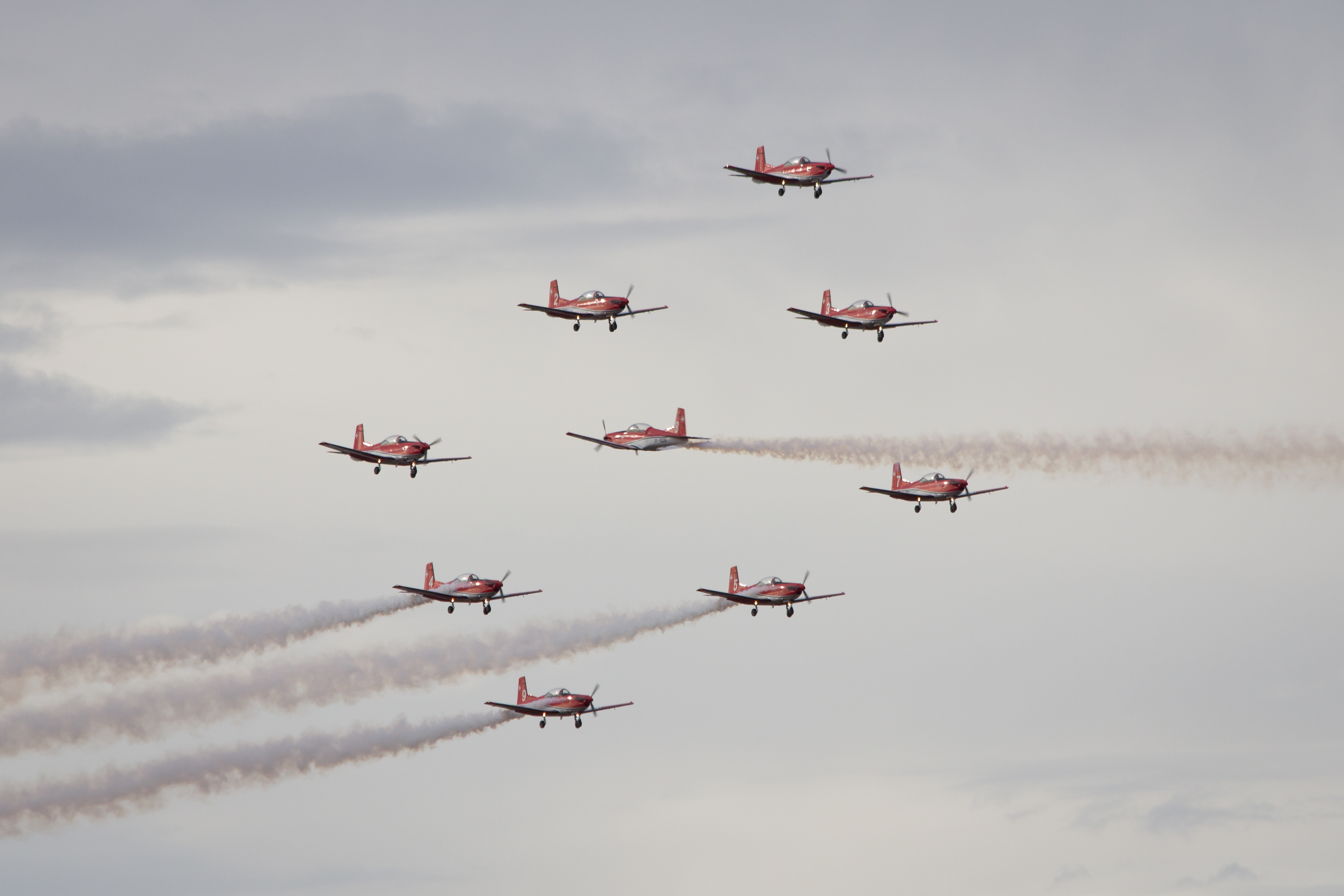
The Tunnel

In 2026 the TEAM is composed of the following people:

CALLSIGN	FUNCTION	NICKNAME
CAPO	Commander	"GALI"
TURBO UNO	Leader	"GOLLUM
TURBO DUE	Right Inner Wing	"SHINE"
TURBO TRE	Left Inner Wing	"NEBBIA"
TURBO QUATTRO	Slot	"RICHI"
TURBO CINQUE	Left Outer Wing	"MUZZI"
TURBO SEXI	Right Outer Wing	"ALDI"
TURBO SETTE	1^{st} Solo	"YURI"
TURBO OTTO	2^{nd} Solo	"SINDI"
TURBO NOVE	2^{nd} Lead	"HAMPI"
PR1	Speaker / PR	"PHILIPPE"
PR2	Speaker / PR	"CEDI"

== Awards ==
- King Hussein Memorial Sword, Royal Air Tattoo UK, 2013
- The Bill Hartree Trophy, RAF Cosford UK, 2017
- The Bill Hartree Trophy, RAF Cosford UK, 2025

== Incidents ==
During an air display held in connection with the 2017 Alpine World Ski Championships in St. Moritz, an aircraft flying too low severed the cable of a cable camera on 17 February 2017, causing the camera to fall from a great height into the finish area of the giant slalom. The snapped cable struck the chairlift that was transporting athletes to the start. The chairlift was then automatically stopped. No one was injured, and the pilot involved was able to land the aircraft safely at the nearby Samedan airport. The second run of the giant slalom had to be delayed by half an hour. No party was found responsible by the military judiciary.

== See also ==
- PC-7 TEAM homepage
- Swiss Air Force website of the PC-7 TEAM
- Patrouille Suisse – the Swiss Air Force's jet aerobatic team
- List of Swiss Air Force display teams
