= Patrouille Suisse =

Swiss military aerobatic team

Swiss Air Force Aerobatic team
- Patrouille Suisse
- Patrouille Suisse insignia
- Active: 8 August 1964 – present
- Country: Switzerland
- Branch: Swiss Air Force
- Role: Aerobatic team
- Size: 9 officers, 21 ground crew
- Garrison/HQ: Emmen
- Colors: Red, White

Commanders
- Current commander: Lt Col Nils Hämmerli "Jamie"

Aircraft flown
- Fighter: 6 Northrop F-5E Tiger II
- Transport: 1 Pilatus PC-6 Porter

The Patrouille Suisse (French pronunciation: [patʁuj sɥis]; lit. 'Swiss Patrol') is an aerobatic team of the Swiss Air Force. The team flies six Northrop F-5E Tiger II fighter jets.

== History ==
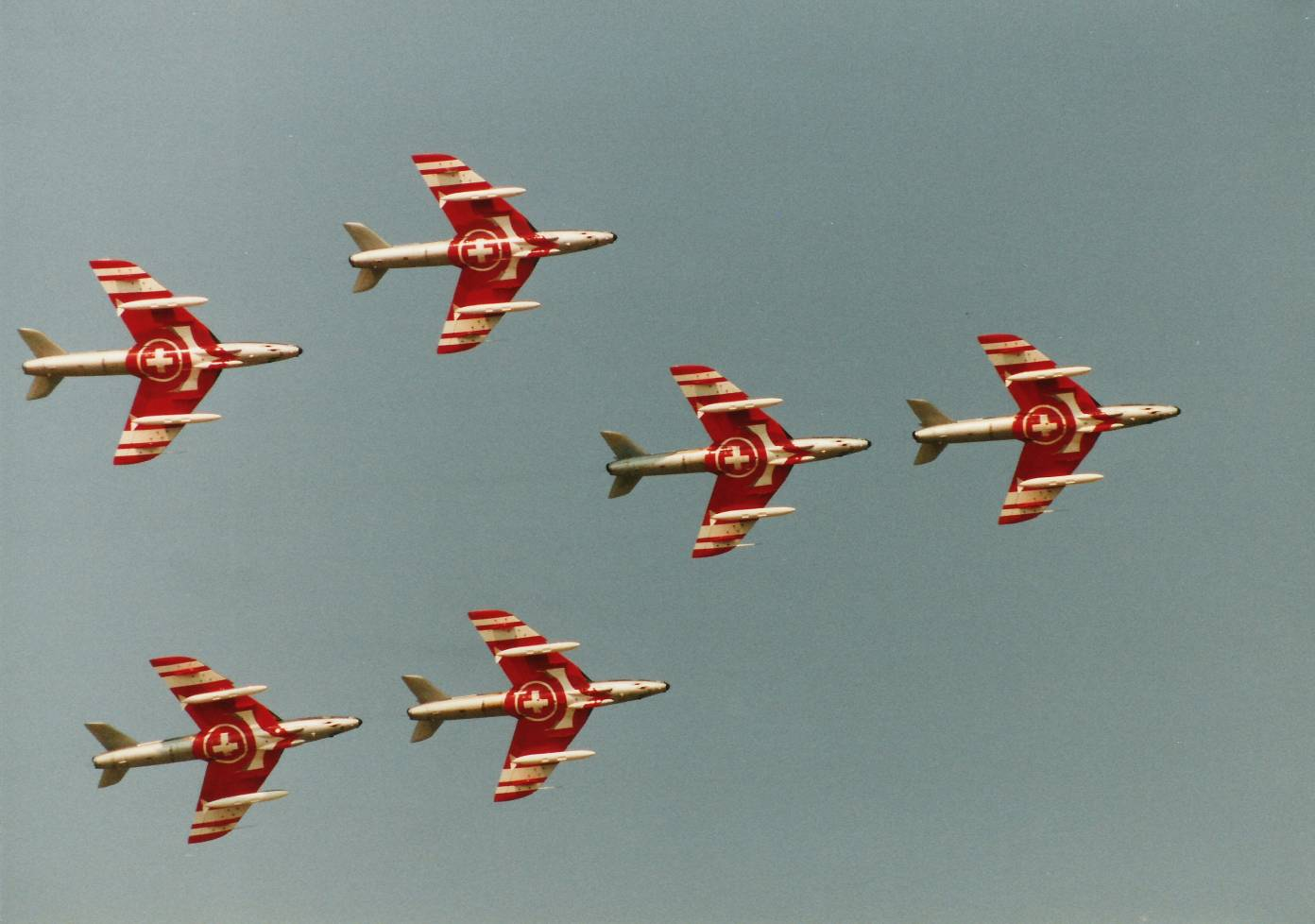
The team flying Hawker Hunters in 1991

The Patrouille Suisse was founded on 22 August 1964 with four Hawker Hunters. Two displays were also flown 1968 with the Dassault Mirage III under the name "Patrouille de Suisse Mirage". Other than those shows the Patrouille Suisse retained the Hunter. In 1970, a fifth aircraft was added to the team, followed by the sixth shortly thereafter. In 1977 a smoke system was introduced.

The Patrouille Suisse flew its Hawker Hunters for the last time in 1994 and transitioned to the faster and more maneuverable Northrop F-5E Tiger II adding smoke systems in 1996. In April the following year, a Pilatus PC-6 Porter single-engine turboprop light aircraft was assigned as a support aircraft, painted in the team's colour scheme.

In February 2013, the Swiss Minister of Defence, Ueli Maurer, stated that the Patrouille Suisse would be disbanded by early 2016 due to the withdrawal of the F-5 from service. The Swiss parliament decided not to purchase 22 Gripen E replacement aircraft. In summer of 2014, the Swiss Air Force released plans to move from six F-5Es to four F/A-18Cs by the end of 2016. To facilitate these reduced operations, fewer air displays would be flown and, as a result, the aircraft were unlikely to receive special paint.

Swiss Air Force and the Swiss parliament planned to extend the service of eighteen F-5E and four F-5F until 2018. This would also include the continued operation of the Patrouille Suisse flying the F-5E until 2018. A unique Flight Demonstration was performed by the Patrouille Suisse on 7 September 2014 at the Air14 Air Show at Payerne Air Base as they flew a 15-plane display with the PC-7 Team.

=== Accidents ===
On 9 June 2016, two of the Northrop F-5E Tiger II's collided in mid-air, while training for the Royal Netherlands Air Force Open Days airshow at Leeuwarden Air Base. One aircraft crashed in a pond near Beetgum after the pilot safely ejected, while the other was damaged, but landed safely. Following investigation, errors by Patrouille Suisse pilots were found to be the cause of the crash, with prosecutors citing overconfidence as a factor.

On 15 June 2023, two Patrouille Suisse aircraft made contact during a training flight for a performance at the Federal Yodeling Festival in Baar, Zug. The nose cone of one aircraft was severed by the collision and impacted a house, breaking windows and injuring one person on the ground. A braking parachute was also deployed by the collision which also fell to the ground. The involved aircraft were able to land with no further incidents and without injuries to the pilots.

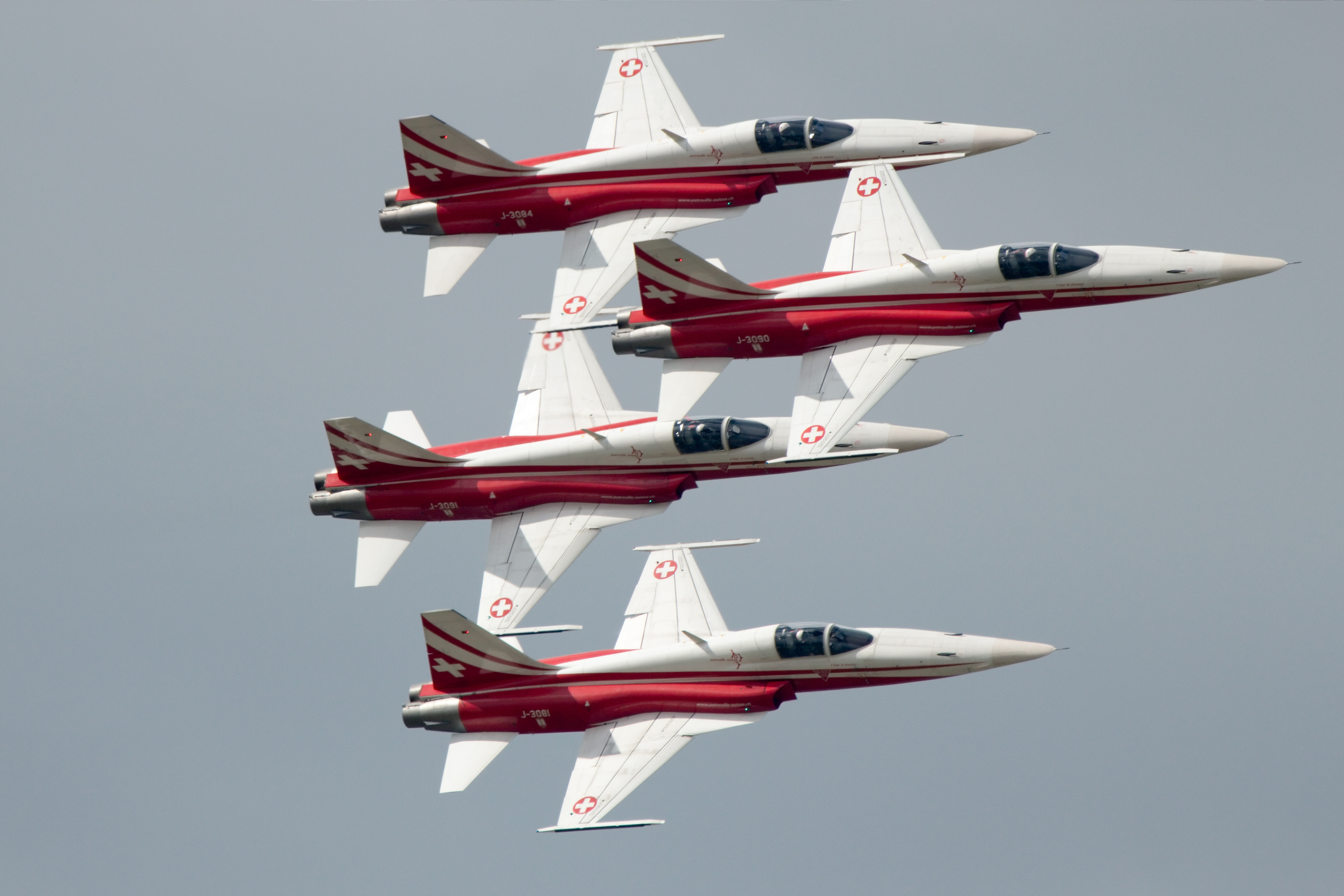
F-5's in formation over ILA Berlin Air Show in 2010

== Aircraft ==
The Patrouille Suisse normally operates six Northrop F-5E Tiger II aircraft out of total of twelve F-5Es that are maintained in team colours. Since 1996 ten aircraft are able to accept one of the eight smoke generators that were made by RUAG. When fitted with a smoke generator, including the two 40 litres (8.8 imp gal; 11 US gal) bottles of diesel, the right gun of the F-5E is disabled.

The teams F-5Es are also used for other purposes such as training and as target tugs flown by Target Squadron 12, facilitated by their high visibility colouring.

A Pilatus PC-6 V-622 "Felix", painted in Patrouille Suisse colours, transports the commander, announcer and the team groundcrew.

== See also ==
- PC-7 Team
- Super Puma Display Team
- Parachute Reconnaissance Company 17
