= Swiss Air Force =

Air component of the Swiss Armed Forces

- Schweizer Luftwaffe (German); Forces aériennes suisses (French); Forze aeree svizzere (Italian); Aviatica militara svizra (Romansh)
- Badge of the Swiss Air Force
- Founded: 31 July 1914; 112 years ago
- Country: Switzerland
- Type: Air force
- Role: Aerial warfare Anti-aircraft warfare
- Size: 20,000 active personnel
- Part of: Swiss Armed Forces
- Website: www.vtg.admin.ch/en/swiss-air-force

Commanders
- Commander of the Air Force: Divisional General Peter Merz
- Deputy Commander of the Air Force: Brigadier Werner Epper

Insignia
- Roundel

Aircraft flown
- Electronic warfare: F-5F Tiger II, Pilatus PC-9
- Fighter: F/A-18C Hornet, F-5E Tiger II
- Helicopter: Eurocopter Cougar, Super Puma, Eurocopter EC635
- Reconnaissance: ADS-15 Hermes 900
- Trainer: Pilatus PC-7, PC-9, PC-21, F/A-18D Hornet, F-5F Tiger II

Swiss Air Force
IATA	ICAO	Call sign
-	SUI	SWISS AIR FORCE

The Swiss Air Force (German: Schweizer Luftwaffe; French: Forces aériennes suisses; Italian: Forze aeree svizzere; Romansh: Aviatica militara svizra) is the air component of the Swiss Armed Forces, established on 31 July 1914, three days after the outbreak of World War I, as a part of the army and in October 1936 as an independent service.

In peacetime, Dübendorf is the operational air force headquarters. The Swiss Air Force operates from several fixed bases (see current status) but its personnel are also trained to carry out air operations from temporary highway airstrips. In case of crisis or war, several stretches of road are specially prepared for this option.

== History ==
=== Early years ===
The first military aviation in Switzerland took the form of balloon transport, pioneered by Swiss balloonist Eduard Spelterini, but by 1914 there was still little official support for an air corps. The outbreak of World War I changed opinions drastically and cavalry officer Theodor Real was charged with forming a flying corps. He commandeered three civilian aircraft at Bern's airfield and set about training the initial nine pilots at a makeshift airfield close to Wankdorf Stadium, later moving to a permanent home at Dübendorf. Switzerland remained neutral and isolated during the conflict, and the air corps confined its activities to training and exercises, reconnaissance and patrol. It was only with the worsening international situation in the 1930s that an effective air force was established at great cost, with up-to-date Messerschmitt Bf 109 and Morane-Saulnier D‐3800 fighters ordered from Germany and France respectively (the Moranes were licence-built in Switzerland). The Swiss Air Force as an autonomous military service was created in October 1936.

=== World War II ===
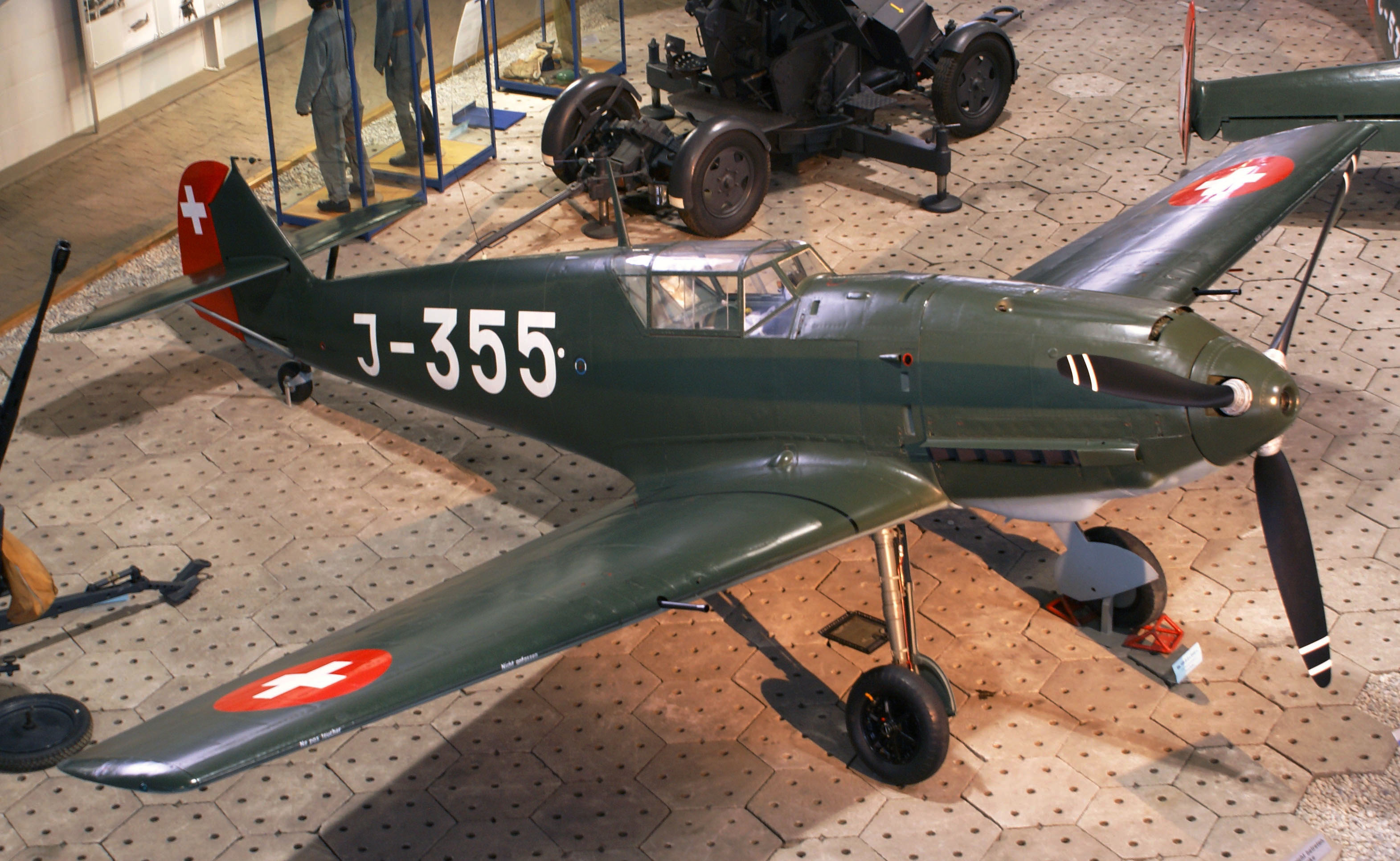
Swiss Bf 109-E3

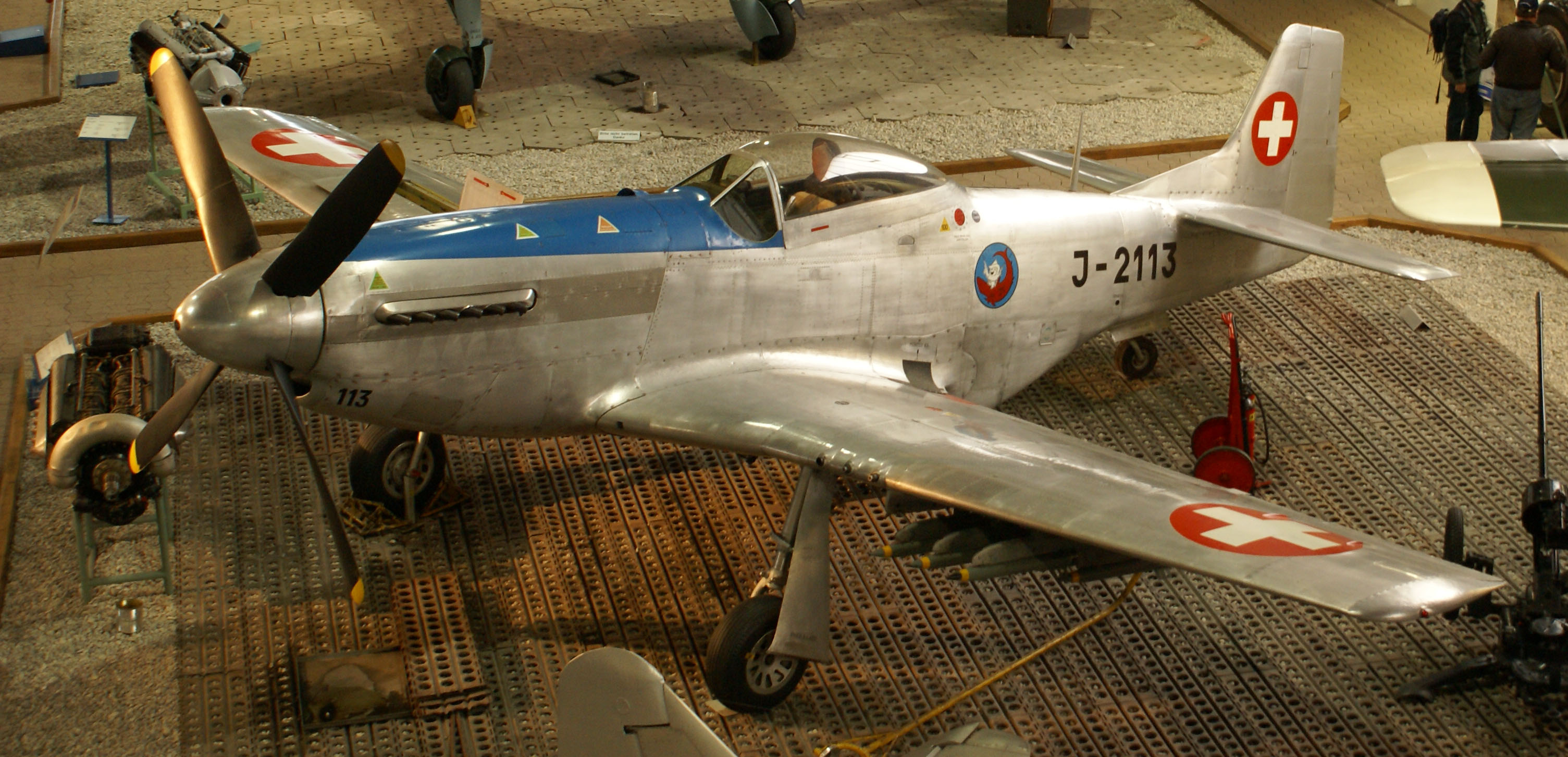
Swiss P-51D

Although Switzerland remained neutral throughout World War II, it had to deal with numerous violations of its airspace by combatants from both sides – initially by German aircraft, especially during their invasion of France in 1940. Zealous Swiss pilots attacked and shot down eleven German aircraft, losing two of their own, before a threatening memorandum from the German leadership forced General Guisan to forbid air combat above Swiss territory.

Later in the war, the Allied bomber offensive sometimes took US or British bombers into Swiss airspace, either damaged craft seeking safe haven or even on occasions bombing Swiss cities by accident. Swiss aircraft would attempt to intercept individual aircraft and force them to land, interning the crews. Only one further Swiss pilot was killed during the war, shot down by a US fighter in September 1944. From September red and white neutrality bands were added to the wings of aircraft to stop accidental attacks on Swiss aircraft by Allied aircraft.

From 1943 Switzerland shot down American and British aircraft, mainly bombers, overflying Switzerland during World War II: six by Swiss air force fighters and nine by flak cannons. 36 Allied airmen were killed. On 1 October 1943 the first American bomber was shot down near Bad Ragaz: Only three men survived. Officers were interned in Davos, airmen in Adelboden. The representative of the U.S. military in Bern, U.S. military attaché Barnwell R. Legge, instructed the soldiers not to flee so as to allow the U.S. Legation to coordinate their escape attempts, but the majority of the soldiers thought it was a diplomatic ruse or did not receive the instruction directly.

On 1 October 1944 Switzerland housed 39,670 internees in all: 20,650 from Italy, 10,082 from Poland, 2,643 from the United States, 1,121 from the United Kingdom (including five Australians), 822 from the Soviet Union, and 245 from France. In September the Office of Strategic Services (OSS) was commissioned by the U.S. Supreme Command to organize the escapes of 1,000 American internees, but the task was not effectively accomplished before late winter 1944/45. Soldiers who were caught after their escape from the internment camp, were often detained in the Wauwilermoos internment camp near Luzern.

Official Swiss records identify 6,501 airspace violations during the course of the war, with 198 foreign aircraft landing on Swiss territory and 56 aircraft crashing there.

With the threat of WW2 and the possible need for the army and civilian population to retreat into the mountains (Reduit) as proposed by General Guisan, it was clear that the army air force needed the ability to attack enemy ground forces in the mountains. To practice this Axalp was selected. After WW2 ground attack by jet aircraft was practiced at Axalp, including strafing and bombing exercises.

During the Cold War, military liaison officers from western, eastern and non-aligned nations were invited to the screenings. Nowadays Axalpfliegerschiessen ("Airshow Axalp") is a performance by the Air Force for anyone interested. It is the only event where everybody may have a look at a live exercise at 1,700 m (5,600 ft) above sea level. The use of helicopter ops at high altitudes, search & rescue and firefighting demonstrations also have become a large part of the Axalp air show.

=== Cold War ===
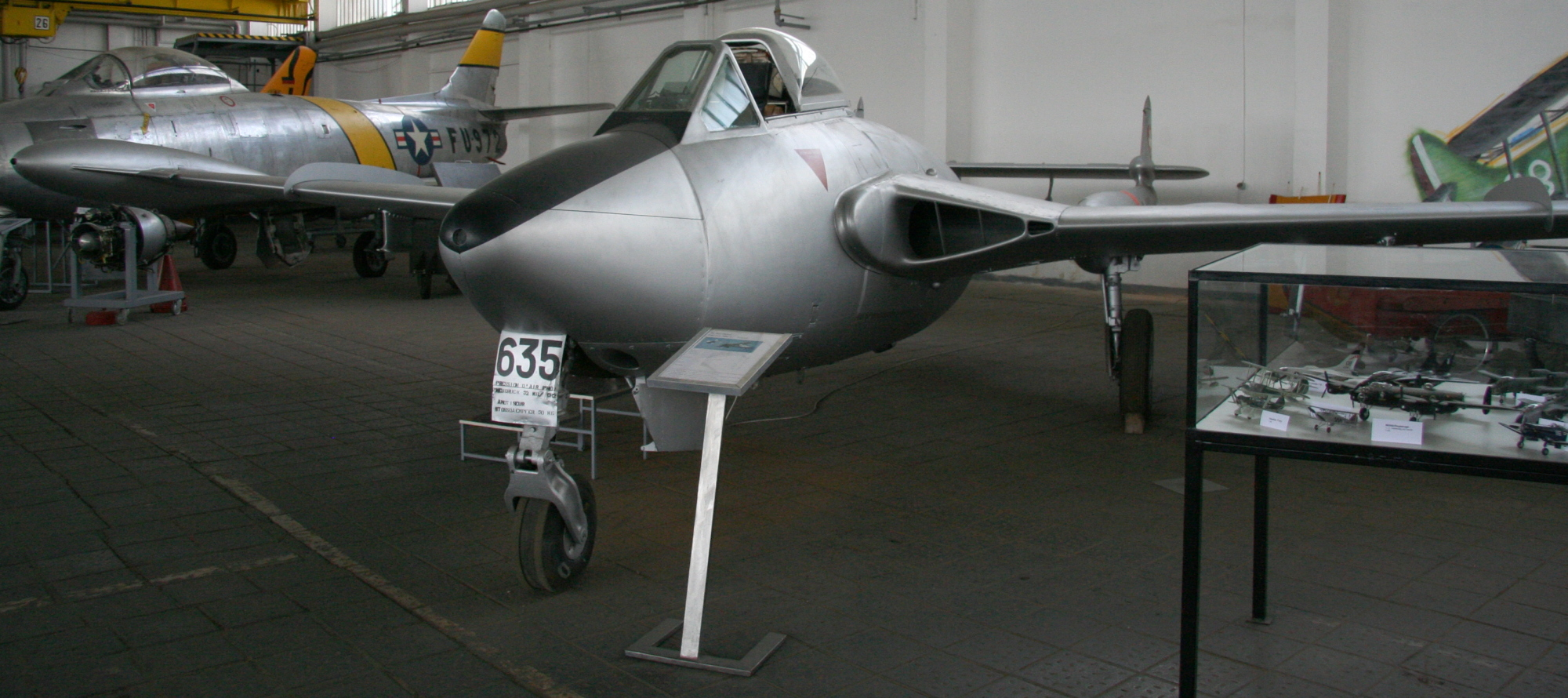
DH112 Venom Mk1R

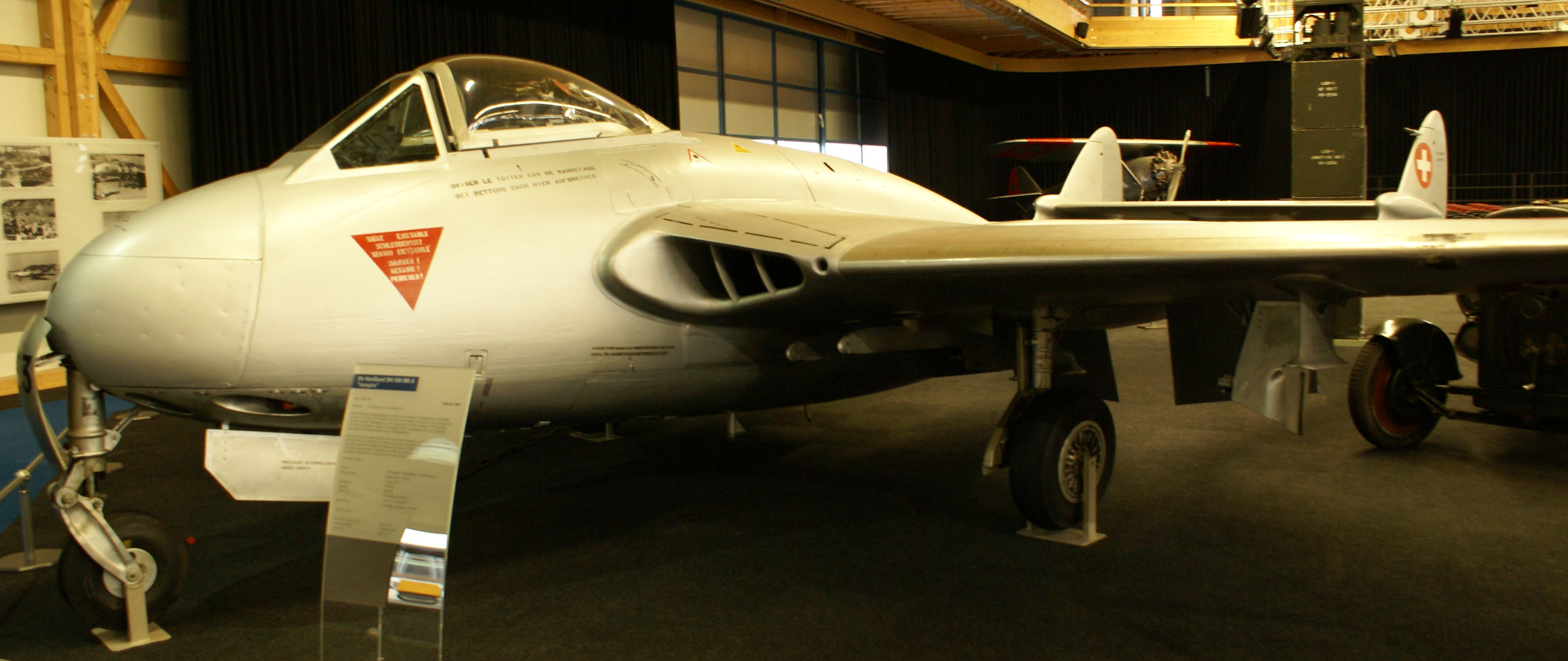
DH100 Vampire Mk6

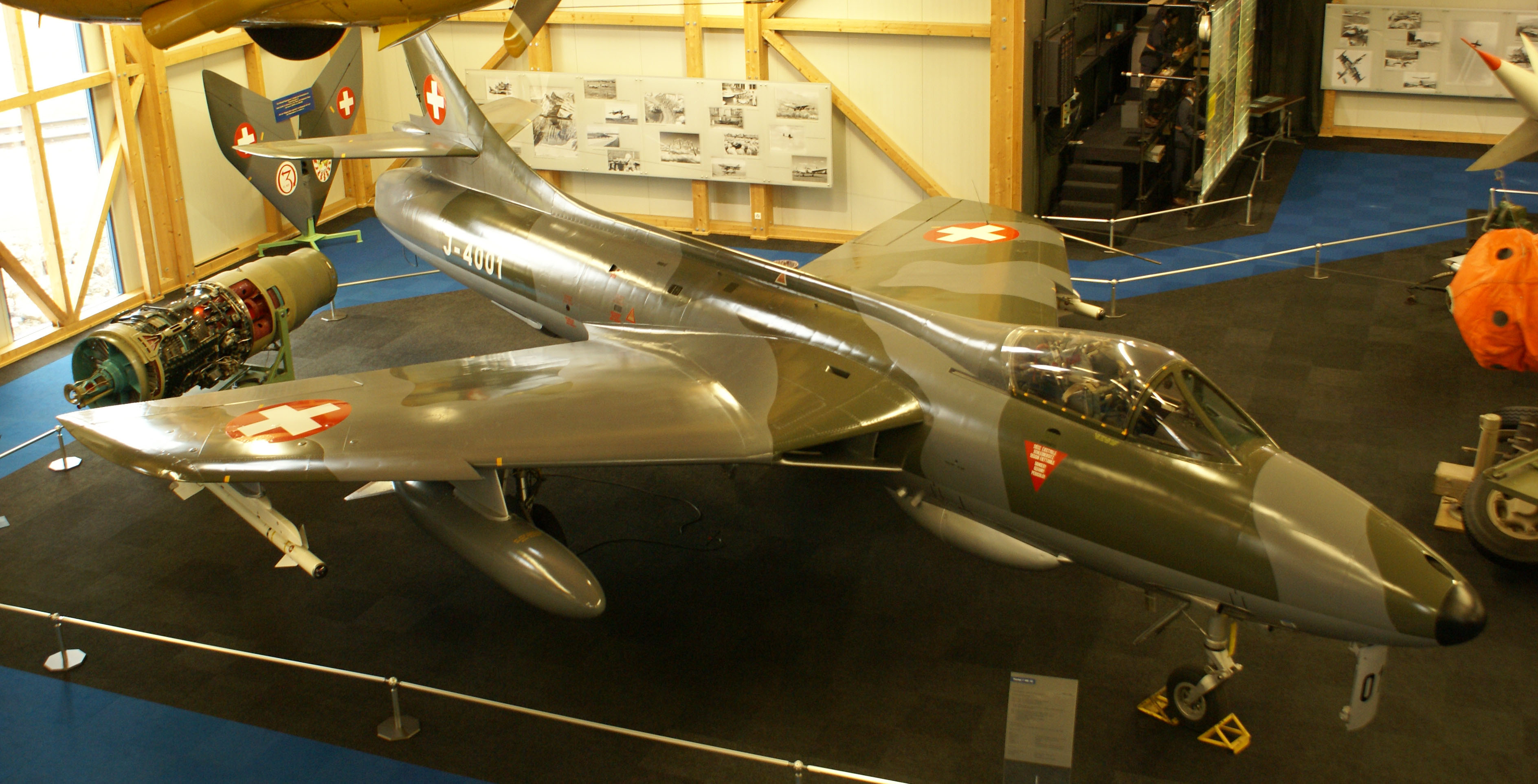
Hawker Hunter Mk58

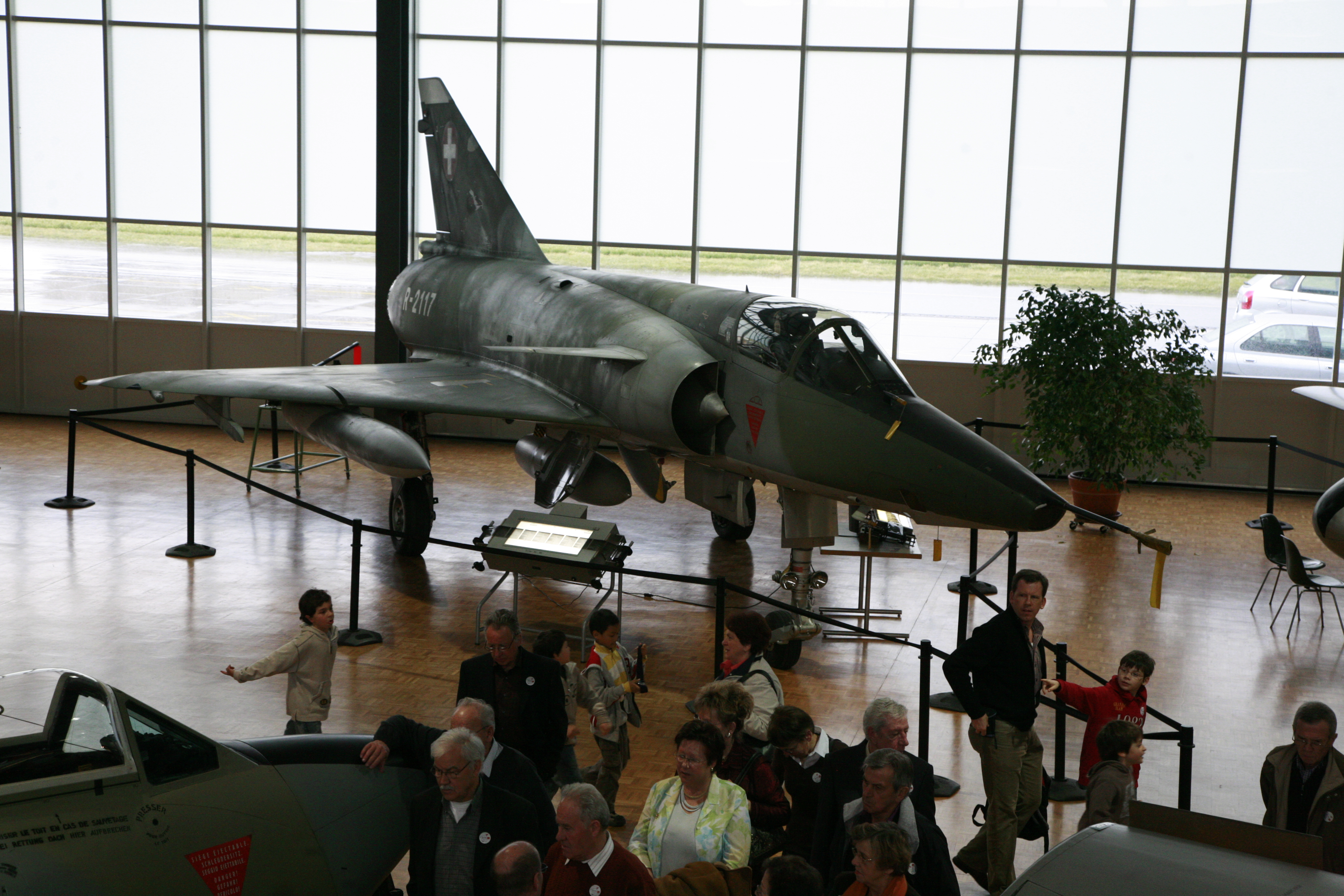
Dassault Mirage 3RS recce

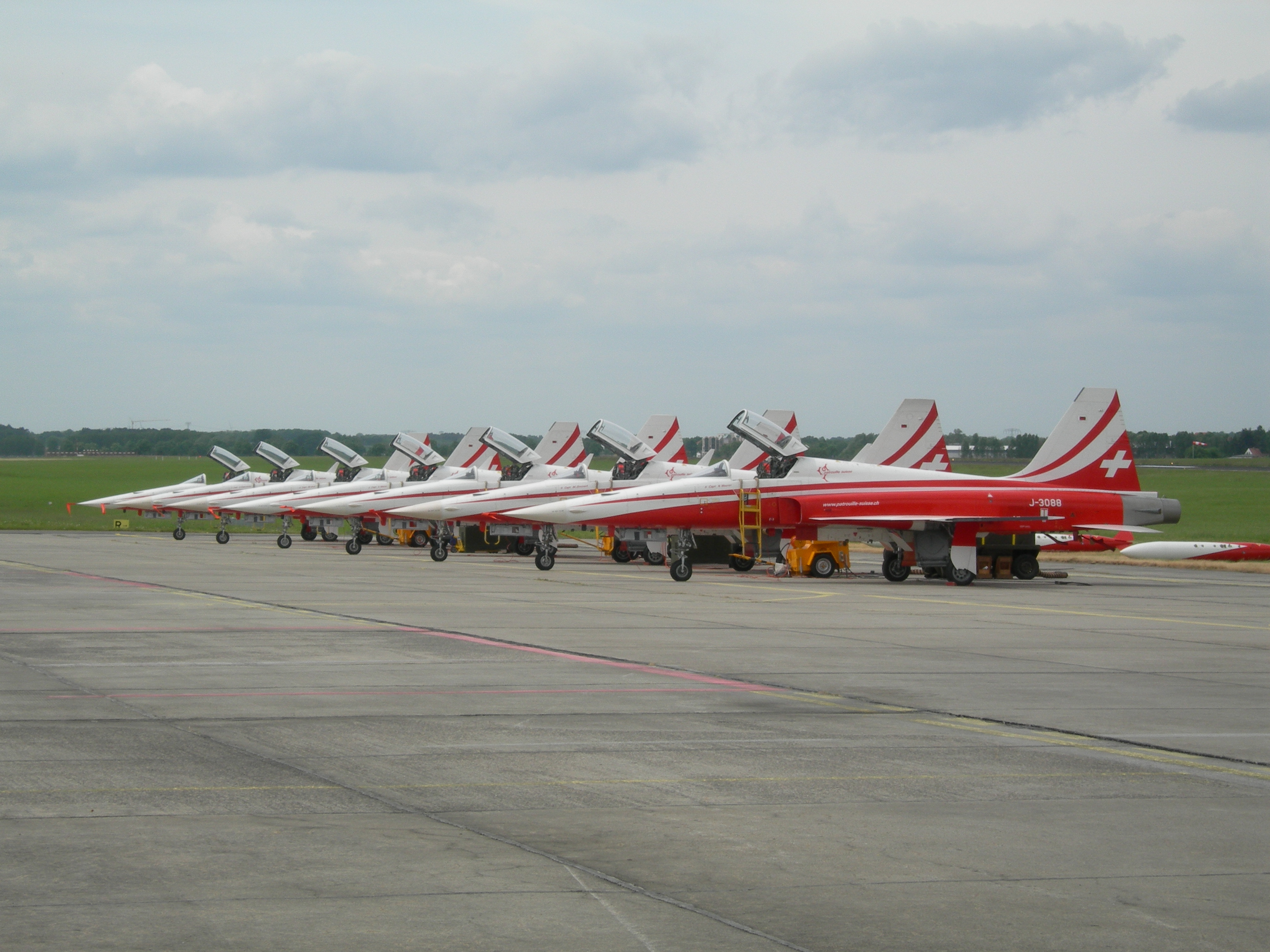
Aerobatics team Patrouille Suisse with F-5E Tiger II

After World War II, the service was renamed Airforce and Anti-Aircraft Command (Schweizerische Flugwaffe Kommando der Flieger und Fliegerabwehrtruppen). In 1966, this became a separate service independent from the Army, under its present name Schweizer Luftwaffe.

With the prospect of a future World War 3 involving nuclear weapons, jet aircraft were purchased: 75 De Havilland Vampires in 1950, followed by over 100 De Havilland Venoms and the same number of Hawker Hunters. The Venoms served until 1983; Vampires until 1990 and Hunters even until 1994. In the late 1940s Switzerland purchased the North American P-51 Mustang from US surplus WW2 stock. The aircraft initially was intended as a stop-gap solution for the Swiss army in order to maintain a defence force during a time when the outdated Bf 109E's and Swiss built D-3801 Moranes were being phased out but the licensed production of the British designed Dh-100 Vampires and Dh-112 Venoms was not in full swing.

At the end of the 1950s, reflecting both the threat of possible invasion by the Soviet Union and a nuclear warfare, Swiss military doctrine changed to mobile defence that included missions outside its territory, in order to defeat stand-off attacks and nuclear threats, including the possibility of defensive employment of air-delivered nuclear weapons. However the inability to field a force capability to carry out such missions led to the return of traditional "protection of own territory" doctrine. Meanwhile, the army started preparing ad hoc airbases in the mountains, with sections of highway strengthened to act as runways and hangars carved out of the mountains.

In 1954 the first Air Radar Recruit School activated, the first early warning radar systems were installed and the concept of command & control facilities at mountain summits was introduced; leading to acquisition of the FLORIDA early warning and command guidance system in 1965 followed by the current FLORAKO system in 2003. At the same time, ground-based air defence (GBAD) projects were initiated such as radar-equipped medium-caliber guns with an integrated 63 Superfledermaus (Superbat) fire control system' as well as the BL-64 ‘Bloodhound’ air defence missile system (1964–1999).

After the prototypes EFW N-20 and FFA P-16, Switzerland did not invest in development combat aircraft anymore. In 1964 the procurement of the Dassault Mirage 3 fighters (1964–2002) caused a scandal due to severe budget overruns. The commander, the chief of the general staff and the minister of defence were forced to resign, followed by a complete restructuring of the air force and air defence units in 1968 and leading to separation of users and procurement officials.

In February 1968, the airfield brigade 32 was founded as part of a reorganization. The airbase group comprised all military airfields in Switzerland, around 16,000 members of the army. Built up by a:

- brigadestaff, airfield regiments Valais (1), Berner Oberland (2), Central Switzerland and Ticino (3) and a nationwide operating Light airfield division.

In combination with the Bundesamt für Militärflugplätze (BAMF), this organization, together with its ZV Central Administration in Dübendorf, constituted a robust structure, which could be activated by mobilization within 48 hours.

The Patrouille Suisse aerobatics team was founded in 1964, the 50th anniversary year of Swiss army aviation.

In 1969, air force logistics and air defence were reassigned into brigades, the Armed Forces Meteo Group and Avalanche Rescue Service came under air force and air defence command and the Para Reconnaissance Company was established.

In the 1970s major manoeuvres with over 22,000 participants took place. A new air defence concept was also introduced in which the air superiority fighter in interceptor role stood central. In 1974 the first 2 Northrop F-5 Tiger fighters were tested and in 1978 the first F-5 Tiger fighter/interceptor squadron became operational.

=== Post-Cold War ===
In the late 1980s changing political and military world situations implied the need for multirole aircraft in the Air Force. After evaluation, the performance of the F/A-18 Hornet was decisive in its selection. Designed for carrier-borne operations, it was optimally suited to operate from very short runways with steep take-offs. Its radar allowed detection of multiple targets and simultaneously engaging with medium-range air-to-air missiles.

Between 1996 and 1999, 34 licence-built Hornets left the assembly lines at Emmen. As the F/A-18 size is larger than either the Mirage III or Tiger II the caverns in the mountains used to protect the aircraft had to be enlarged, a continuing process as of 2011.

The 100th anniversary of the Swiss Air Force has been celebrated in 2014 with the airshow Air14 at Payerne.

==== Missions ====
Switzerland is a small country which has always kept its neutrality. Therefore, its air component is also limited in size and not capable of fighting a long-term full scale air conflict. So the main Swiss Air Force mission is to guarantee Swiss air sovereignty and air defence throughout the country. This is achieved by:

- maintaining general airspace control preventing unauthorised airspace intrusion through round-the-clock radar coverage (to be expanded by activation of ground-based air defence (GBAD) units)
- a 24/7 air policing as an active airspace protection.

Its secondary missions are executing airlift, reconnaissance operations, and gathering and interpreting intelligence for the Swiss political and military leadership.

==== Status ====
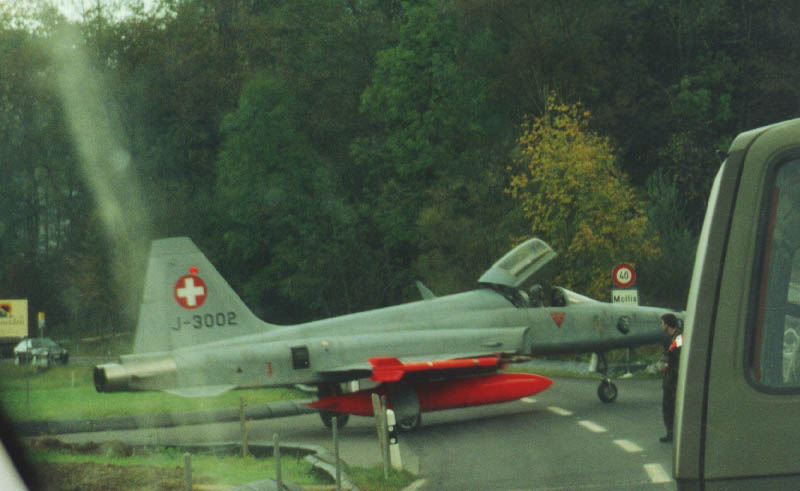
An F-5E Tiger II at its hardened aircraft shelter, Mollis airfield, 1999

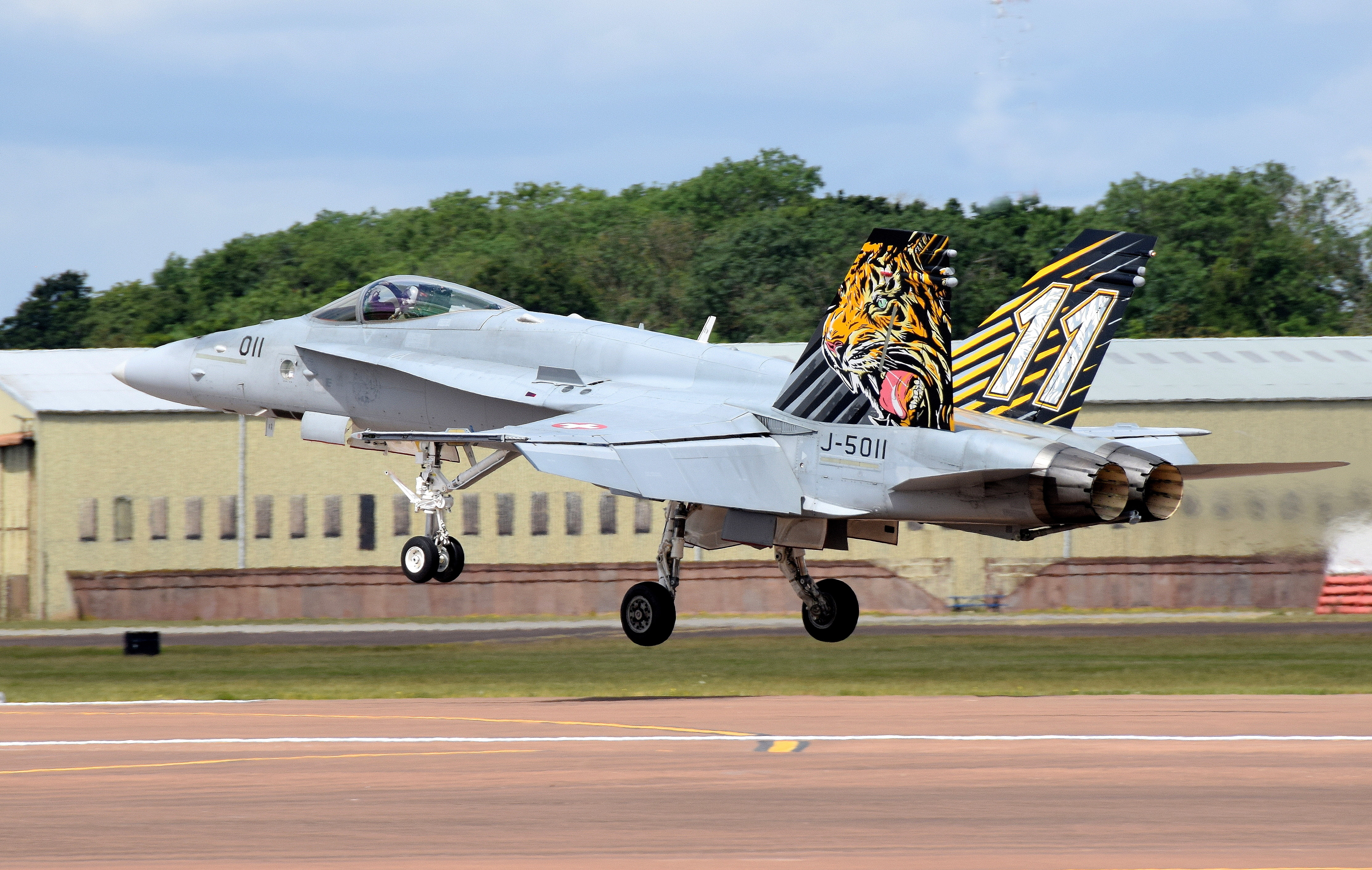
F/A-18C Hornet of Fliegerstaffel 11 arriving at the 2019 RIAT, England

Through the years, the Swiss Air Force traditionally had been a militia-based service, including its pilots. Its inventory existed of approximately 450 aircraft whose operational service life overlapped several eras. Beginning with its separation from the army in 1966 the Air Force has been reduced in size (currently about 230 fixed and rotary-wing aircraft) moving towards a small professional cadre with fewer reserves and conscripted supporting personnel. Currently the Swiss air force has a peacetime strength of 1,600 career military and about 20,000 reservists on call.

Its air defence consists of 30 McDonnell Douglas F/A-18 Hornets and 53 Northrop F-5 Tiger IIs (110 purchased in 1978–85). The F/A-18 pilots are career military; the F-5 pilots however are reservists (mostly air- or freight-liner pilots with F-5 rating). During reserve duty periods they are assigned to military duties refreshing their operational live flying training and rating. In 2008, the Swiss F-18 component reached its 50,000 flight hour milestone. Due to the RUAG Upgrade 21 (UG21) programme between 2004 and 2009 and the Mid-Life Update (MLU) its operational lifecycle was guaranteed until 2022.

From 2011 the air force intended to start the Partial F-5 Tiger Replacement programme for 22 new aircraft with the JAS 39 Gripen, Eurofighter Typhoon and Dassault Rafale as replacement candidates. In November 2011 the Swiss government announced its decision to buy 22 Gripen New Generation fighters. The contract for the 22 aircraft was signed at 3.1 billion Swiss francs. On 25 August 2012, the order was confirmed by both the Swedish and Swiss authorities.

The first new aircraft would be delivered in 2018 and the intention was to lease 11 current generation (eight JAS 39Cs/3 JAS 39Ds) Gripen fighters from 2016 to 2020 in order to train Swiss fighter pilots while avoiding expensive upkeep of the F-5s. However, in a national referendum in May 2014 a majority of Swiss rejected the purchase of the Gripen. This included continued operation of the Patrouille Suisse on F-5E.

To reduce the risk of a negative referendum outcome the Swiss defence ministry revised its procurement strategy. With its Air 2030 programme The Swiss government now opted for a planning order for a combined purchase of new fighters together with long-range groundbased air defences (GBAD). This programme valued at CHF8 billion ($8.1 billion), the biggest arms procurement programme in Modern history of Switzerland. Defence minister Viola Amherd unveiled results of studies tackling the defence procurement package: fighters replacing both the current F-5 Tigers and F/A-18 Hornets scheduled to be retired in the 2020s as well as a reconfigured GBAD.

Armasuisse, the Federal Office for Defence Procurement, asked several companies to submit pricing for 40 aircraft including missile armament and logistics as well as an assessment of the number of aircraft necessary to fulfil Swiss needs and kicked off the competition for 5 types of combat aircraft under consideration (Eurofighter Typhoon, Boeing F-18 Super Hornet, Dassault Rafale, Lockheed Martin F-35A and Saab Gripen E) at Payerne Air Base. With a reconfigured GBAD system covering appx 15,000 km2 in the densely populated Swiss plateau the balance between fighter aircraft and ground-based air defence would be ensured for the next decades. On the 30th of June 2021 the F-35A was announced as the winner of the competition.

On 10 December 2010, the last 20 outdated Aérospatiale Alouette III were replaced by two VIP configuration Eurocopter EC135s and 18 Eurocopter EC635s. The first EC-635 was delivered in 2008.

==== Limitations ====
In peacetime the air defence radar coverage is maintained on a 24/7 basis. Until late 2020, the aviator corps however was incapable of maintaining a matching state of readiness due to limited budget and lack of staff available and was operated from 06:00-22:00 local time only. This became painfully clear as the Swiss Air Force was unable to respond to the Ethiopian Airlines ET702 hijacking in February 2014 which occurred outside routine operating hours. Agreements with Italy and France in particular enabled fighters from both air forces to enter Swiss airspace to handle the threat.

The aim for a 24-hour Quick Reaction Alert readiness of two armed F/A-18 fighters was achieved on 31 December 2020.

A major problem in defending the Swiss airspace is the size of the country. The Swiss maximum extension is only 348 kilometres (216 mi). Commercial airliners may pass over in about 15–20 minutes, while fast jets would take even less time. However, noise-abatement issues traditionally caused problems for the Swiss Air Force because of the tourist industry. Due to these reasons, the Swiss Air Force is increasingly participating in air defence training exercises with many NATO counterparts. These exercises have covered the 2006 Winter Olympics in Turin, the Euro 2008 football championships, and the annual World Economic Forum.

== Operational structure ==
Swiss Air Force locations, 2018
Fighters Helicopters Other flying units Operations Centre Radar station

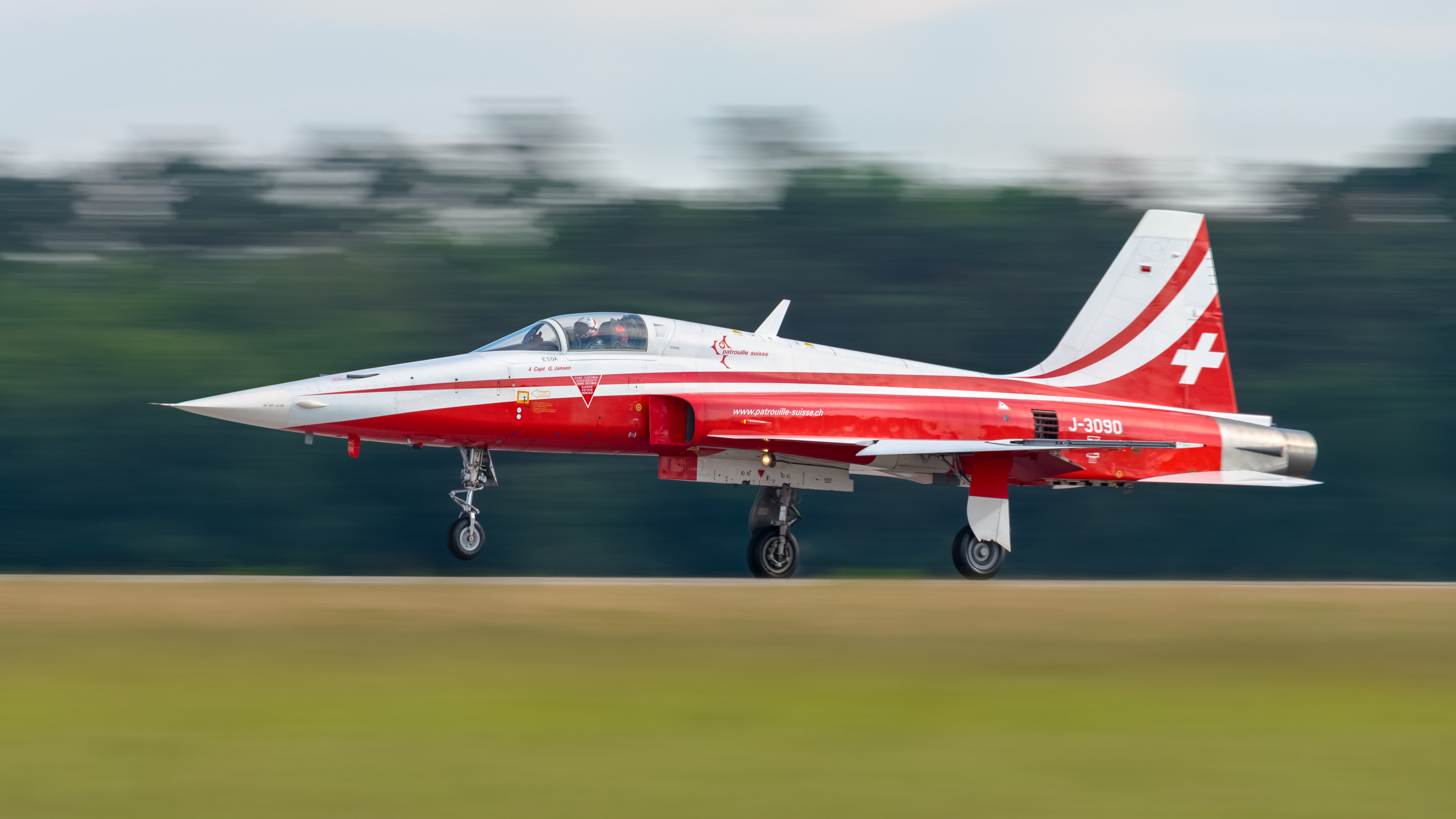
Northrop F-5E Tiger

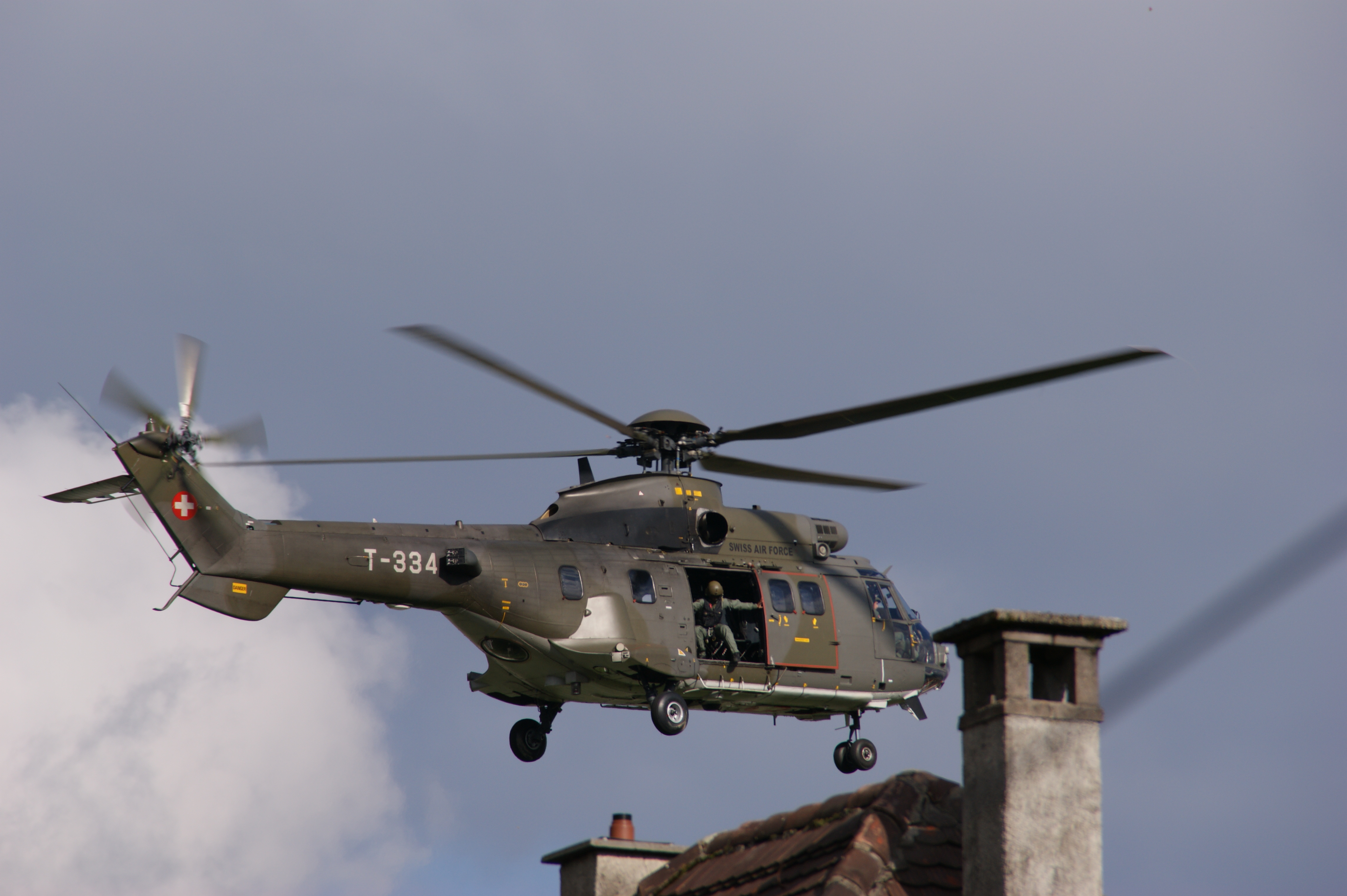
Cougar AS532 T 334

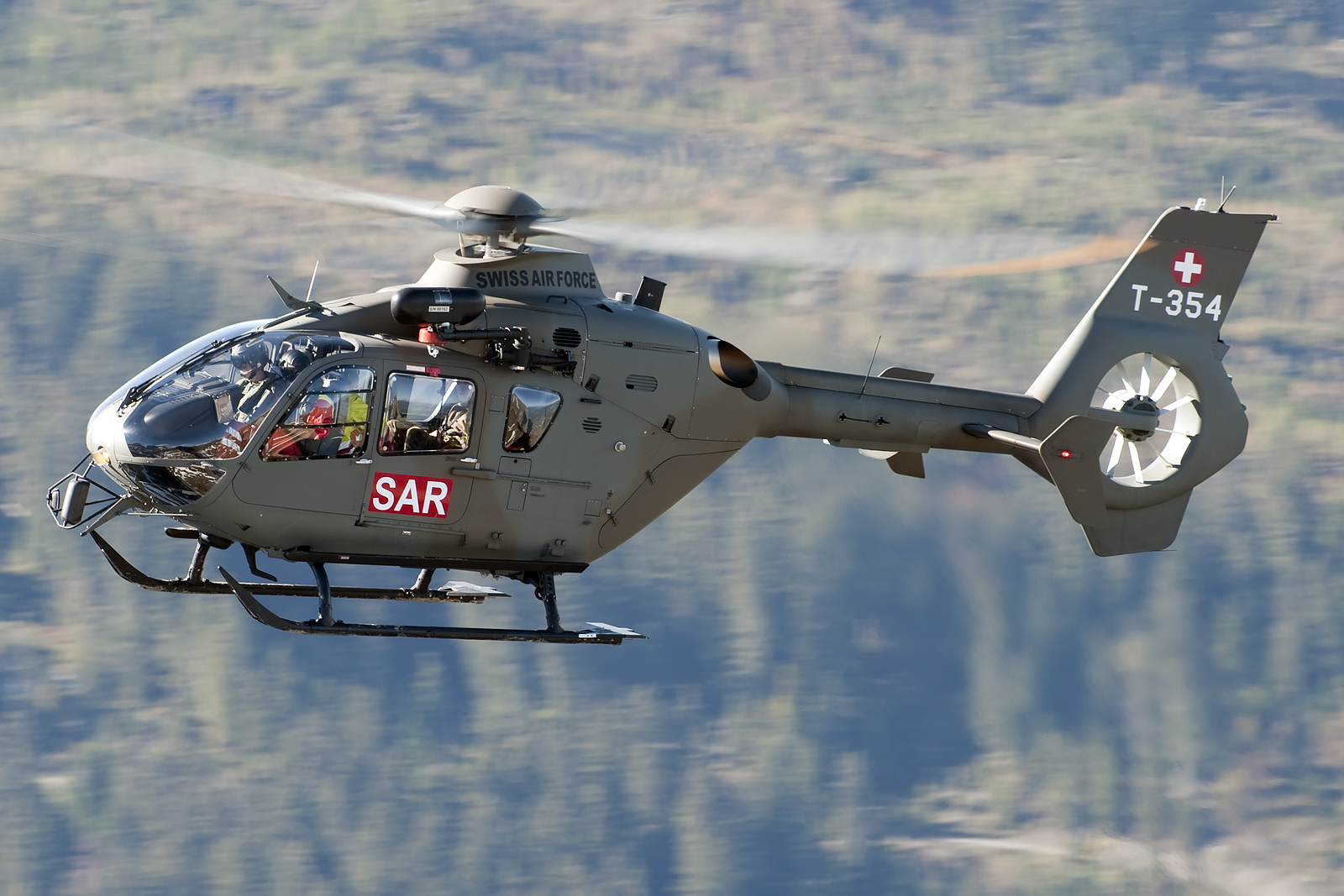
T-354 Eurocopter EC635

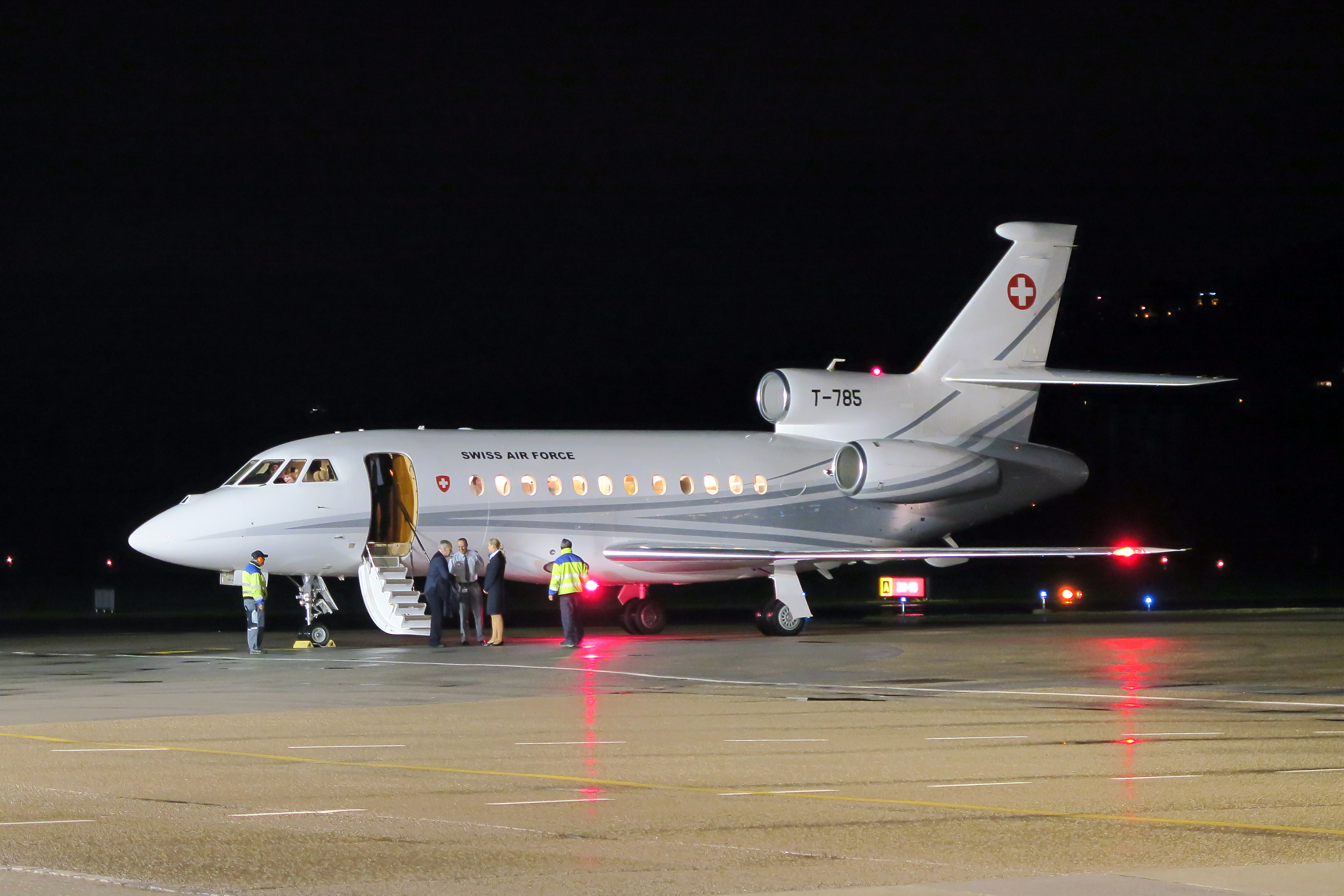
T-785 VIP flight

=== Air defence, air surveillance and air policing ===
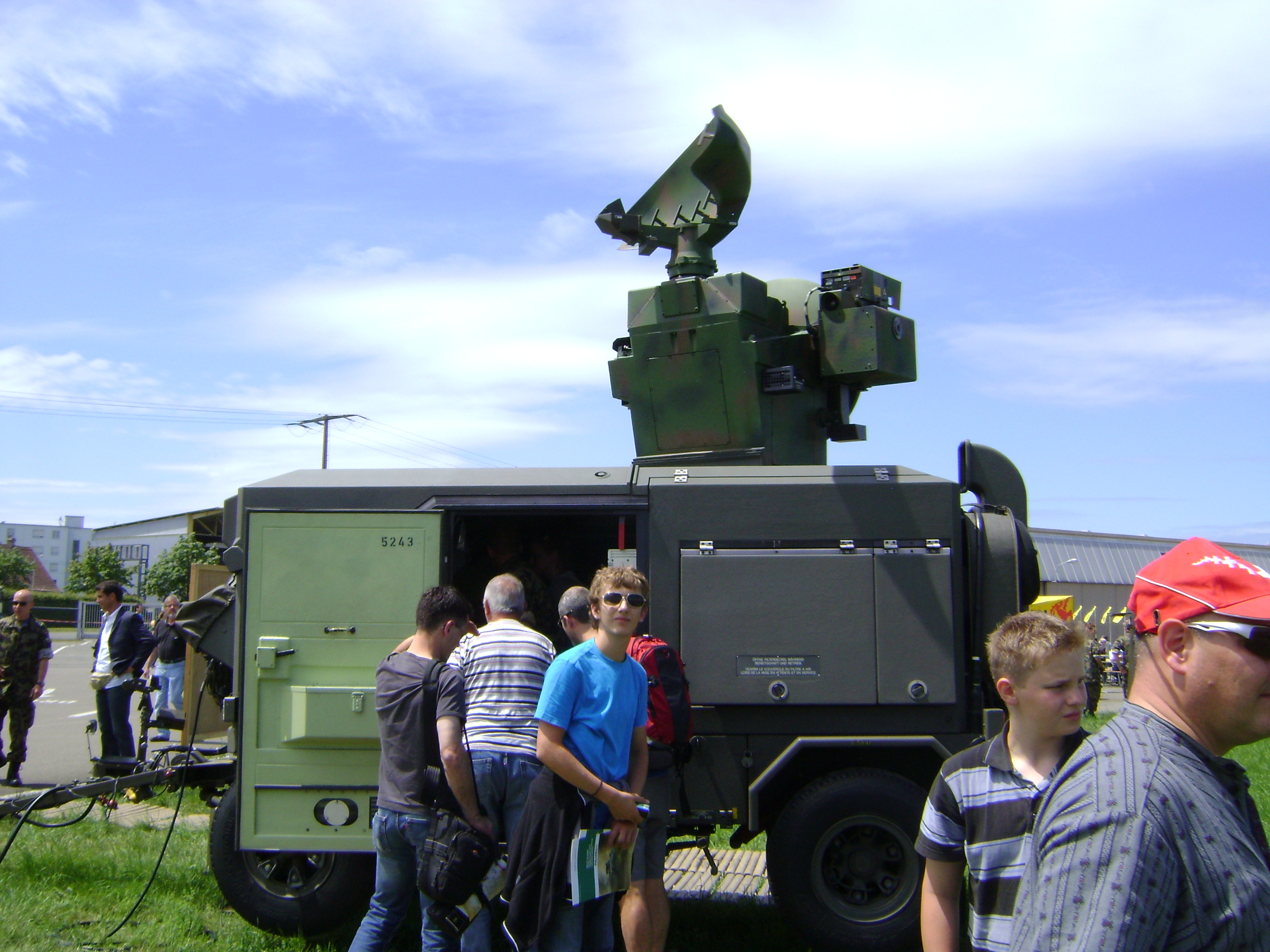
GBAD Oerlikon Skyguard

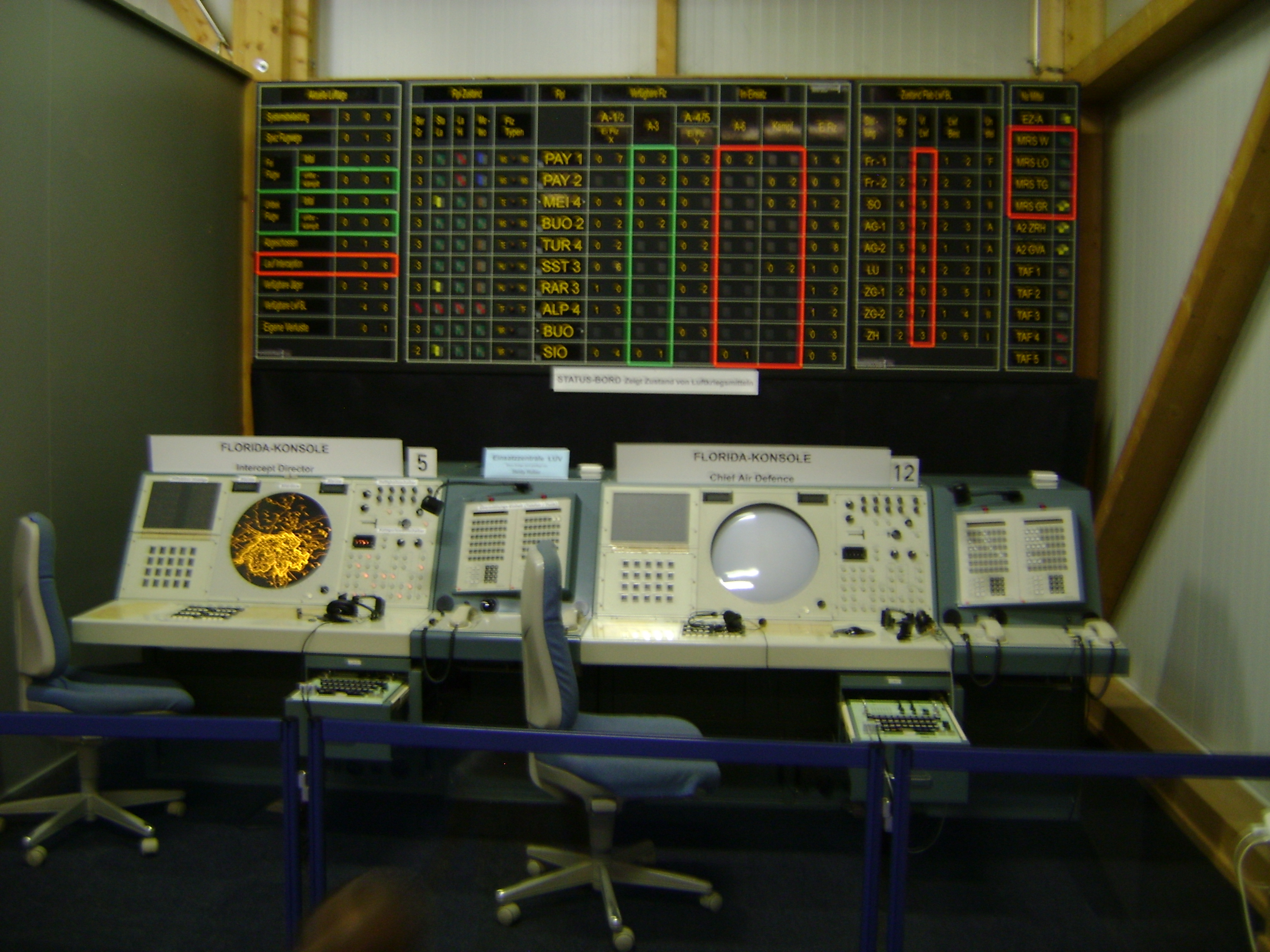
FLORIDA workspace at Dübendorf

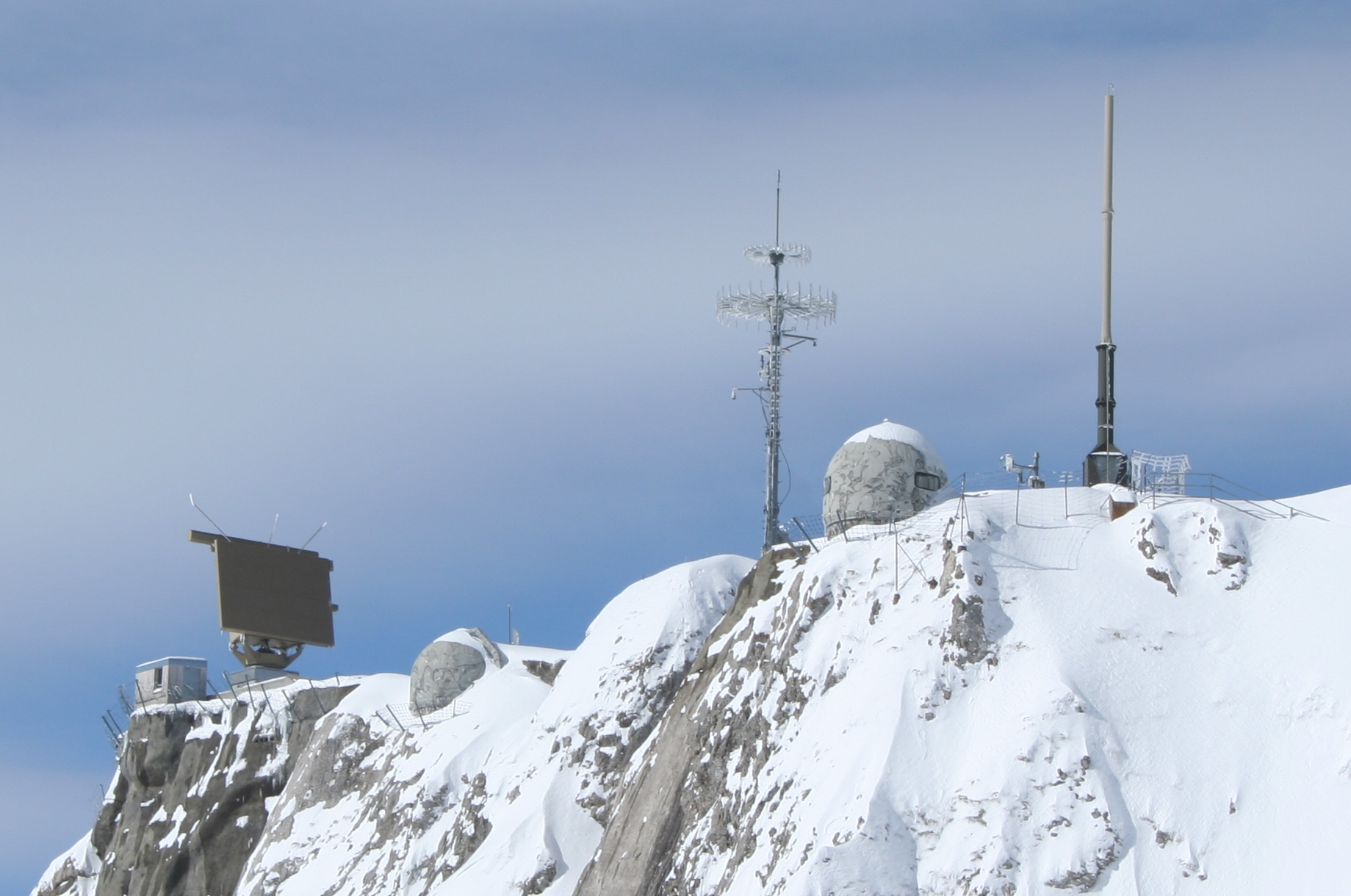
FLORAKO radar at Mount Pilatus

During the past 35 years, Swiss military and civil airspace control depended on the FLORIDA (FLugsicherungs Operations Radar IDentifikation Alarm – Flight Ops, Radar Identifying, and Alerting) air defense system.

Since its phasing out, however, the Swiss airspace control and defence is being carried out by the THALES Raytheon FLORAKO. This system is being operated from 4 fixed locations on the Pilatus, Scopi, Weisshorn and Weissfluh mountains.

At least one of these Command, Control, and Communications (C3) facilities is always connected to the Air Defence & Direction Center (ADDC or air ops centre) at Dübendorf Air Base and fully operational on-line on a 24/7 basis, monitoring Swiss airspace. Depending on the international situation, more facilities will be manned; in case of crisis or war (ADDC and 4 facilities operational) radarcoverage will be extended far beyond the Swiss boundaries. Each of these facilities is capable of making all battle management decisions in case of elimination of the ADDC or other facilities.

The first FLORAKO unit activated in 2003 and the operational lifetime of this hi-tech system is guaranteed by its manufacturers for at least 25 years. The system consists of:

- A communication system KOMSYS. Integrating element of all geographically divided parts of the FLORAKO system uniting speech, data communications, and system commands in a single data network.
- A radar station FLORES. Consisting of standard high-power search radars, advanced radars (search mode, high-update ratio, and special functions), and civil authority mono-pulse secondary radars. The 4 radar stations are the main data sources and are complemented by existing military and civil radar data.
- A radar layer-system RALUS. Translating the data automatically into flight paths and producing a complete civil-military air picture for all authorities.
- A warning message system LUNAS-EZ. AirOps Centres are the combining factors between the FLORAKO-system with real-time data (air picture, planning, and environmental data) and its military users. Workstations are identically configured and built accordingly to latest ergonomics, visual colour high resolution, menu guidance, and known user environment. The Dübendorf Air Defence & Direction Centre – as well as the air operations units in the Alps – are equally equipped, thus assuring full-time operational redundancy in producing the actual air-picture; permanent defence of airspace; early warning; command and control; coordination of civil and military air traffic and air policing.
- The Military-Civil Airspace Management System MICAMS. This secondary system provides a computing backup for flexible airspace use for both civil and military flight security.

The radar system may eventually be completed by 2 mobile TAFLIR (TAktische FLIeger Radars – Tactical Flight Radars). These AN/MPQ-64 radars are a variant of the Northrop Grumman AN/TPS-75 and are deployable in areas of difficult terrain or where specific coverage is needed. Peacetime TAFLIR deployment locations are at Dübendorf Air Base and Emmen. In time of crisis or at war they can be deployed anywhere.

Air surveillance in Switzerland (including the airspace of Liechtenstein) is also called Permanent Air Surveillance (PLÜ); uninterrupted 24/365 coverage with the FLORAKO system, wherein the Identifications Officer (IDO) and Track Monitor (TM) monitor and represent the general Recognized Air Picture (RAP).

The Air Force has several operational centres. In peacetime, the primary military command centre is at Dübendorf Air Base joint with the civilian air traffic control Skyguide. The locations of the other operational centres are classified. The command centres are part of the unit "Einsatz Luftwaffe," the chief of which is directly subordinate to the commander of the Air Force. It consists of the operations center of the Air Force, redundant direct connections to the emergency organizations (air rescue and federal police), as well as to the 2 Skyguide air traffic centers (Geneva and Zurich) and to the relevant military and civilian air traffic control centers of neighboring countries.

Air policing is the main peacetime activity of the Swiss Air Force. The Air Force distinguishes live missions (observation, identification) and hot missions (intervention).

Year	Live mission	Hot mission	Notes
2006	342	22	
2007	295	23	
2008	308	23	
2009	294	9	
2010	246	22	
2011	350	12	
2012	207	10	
2013	202	9	
2014	277	15	
2015	276	37	
2016	337	26	
2017	292	36	
2018	245	16	
2019	270	18	
2020	290	15	

=== Ground based air defense ===
The Ground Based Air Defence (GBAD) is currently headquartered at Emmen Air Base. Formerly it used the fixed emplacement BL-64 "Bloodhound" missile system. The current system uses three shorter ranged but mobile systems which may be deployed anywhere.

- Rapier a mobile 10 km range surface-to-air system. Operated as towed four-missile launchers and related command and control vehicles – 40 units in service.
- FIM-92 Stinger man portable 4.8 km range shoulder-launched infrared surface-to-air missile with a related Stinger Alert short range radar – 96 units in service.
- Oerlikon 35 mm twin cannon 4 km range towed anti-aircraft artillery operating with a Skyguard fire control radar with 15 km detection range. 24 units in service.

=== Supporting third party organisations ===
The Swiss Air Force supports third party organisations with equipment and staff. It provides the civilian radar Skyguide with FLORAKO radardata enabling safe air traffic management. Air Force helicopters and drones regularly conduct surveillance flights for the Border Guard Corps GWK, for general surveillance at major events and search flights (SAR) for national police and Rega (air rescue). The Fire Department also uses its drones and helicopters with FLIR to locate forestfires and to extinguish them with Bambibuckets. 3 helicopters supported Swisscoy in the KFOR, some supported in large-scale events for relief abroad (e.g. Sumatra after the tsunami). The Air Force supports the Federal Office of Public Health, National Emergency Operations Centre and conducts regular ENSI flights collecting airquality data and radioactivity measurements; it also does parabolic F-5 flights as part of the ARES program of the ETH Zurich and other research institutions. The Air Force also modified all diplomatic flights outside the opening times of the FOCA and represents the REGA (Swiss Air Rescue) communication systems. The Swiss Air Force operates the Rescue Coordination Center "RCC Zurich" on behalf of the FOCA at the Dübendorf Air Base.

== Future ==
Planned acquisitions and projects in progress

- FLORAKO upgrading: In 2017 Armasuisse and RUAG confirmed the contract with Thales for the upgrading of the Master A and M type radars in the FLORAKO system.
- ADS15: As part of the Armament Program 2015, six Elbit Hermes 900 will replace the remaining 15 RUAG Ranger ADS-95s that are still in service by 2019.
- Transport aircraft: In 2015, Minister of Defence Ueli Maurer gave assurances that a transport aircraft purchase was planned by 2018. Initial competitors included the Lockheed C-130 Hercules, Boeing C-17 Globemaster III, Alenia C-27, Airbus C-295 and Airbus A400M Atlas, but the C-17 has since ceased production.
- BODLUV2020: The three anti-aircraft systems (Oerlikon 35 mm twin cannon FIM-92 Stinger and Rapier missile) should be replaced by 2020 by two systems which will have their command and control connected to the FLORAKO System.
- 24h/365 QRA15: by 2020 the Swiss Air Force intends to have a round-the-clock 15 minutes Quick Reaction Alert capability (15 minutes from an alert to fighters becoming airborne) with fully armed F/A-18 fighter jets, based at Militärflugplatz Emmen and at Payerne Air Base (the main base for QRA operations); During this time, the presence of F/A-18s will be steadily increased to full strength at permanent readiness.
- F/A-18 replacement: In June 2021, it was announced that the Lockheed Martin F-35A had been chosen to replace Switzerland's fleet of F/A-18 Hornets. A total of 36 aircraft are planned to be procured, alongside which Switzerland will also purchase five MIM-104 Patriot SAM systems. Switzerland allocated $6.48 billion funds for total 36 F-35A fighter jets. Raytheon America to partner with Rheinmetall Air Defence and Radar Systems and Mercury Systems to provide Patriot air defense systems to Switzerland as part of $2.16 billion contract.

== Equipment and designations ==
=== Current equipment ===
==== Aircraft ====
Aircraft	Origin	Role	Variant	In service	Notes
Combat aircraft
F-5 Tiger II	United States	Light fighter	F-5E	15	6 assigned to the Patrouille Suisse.
F/A-18 Hornet	United States	Multirole fighter	F/A-18C	25	28 initially, 3 losses.
F-35 Lightning II	United States	Stealth swingrole fighter	F-35A	0	30 to be received, despite 36 ordered initially, replacing the F/A-18C/D.
Transport
Pilatus PC-6	Switzerland	Transport / utility (STOL)		14	
Bombardier Challenger 600	Canada	VIP / MEDEVAC	CL604	2	Operated by the Federal Air Transport Service.
Bombardier Global 7500	Canada	VIP		1	Operated by the Federal Air Transport Service
Special role aircraft
Super King Air	United States	Photomapping / transport	300C	1	Operated for the Swiss Office of Topography.
DHC-6 Twin Otter	Canada	Photomapping		1	Operated for the Swiss Office of Topography.
Pilatus PC-12	Switzerland	Test aircraft		1	Armasuisse, test aircraft for the FLORAKO system.
Diamond DA42 Twin Star	Austria / United States	Test aircraft	MPP Centaur OPA	1	Armasuisse, development of UAS system for ADS 15 UAV.
Helicopters
Aérospatiale AS 332M1 Super Puma	France	Utility / SAR	TH06	15	TH89 prior to modernisation, TH06 after modernisation.
Eurocopter AS532 Cougar	France	Utility / SAR	AS532UL (TH18)	10	12 purchased, 1 lost in 2011, 1 lost in 2016. TH98 when purchased, 9 modernised to standard TH18
Eurocopter EC635	Germany	Utility	EC635 P2+	17	20 purchased, 2 configured for VIP transport, and 1 of the 18 utility variant was lost in 2024.
Eurocopter EC635	Germany	VIP	EC635 P2+	2	20 purchased, 2 configured for VIP transport, and 1 of the 18 utility variant was lost in 2024.
Trainer aircraft
Pilatus PC-7	Switzerland	Basic trainer	PC-7 WE	27	
Pilatus PC-21	Switzerland	Advanced trainer / LiFT		7	MLU in 2020.
F-5 Tiger II	United States	Conversion trainer	F-5F	4	
F/A-18 Hornet	United States	Conversion trainer	F/A-18D	5	
UAVs
Elbit Hermes 900	Israel	ISR	ADS 15	3	3 more on order.

==== Vehicles ====
Name	Image	Origin	Type	In service (2025)	Notes
Firefighting
Rosenbauer Panther 6×6 S Panther 33.700 6×6 A135	(illustration)	Austria	Airport crash tender	19	Support deployments of the Swiss Air Force.
Rosenbauer Panther 8×8 Flugfeldlöschwagen schwer		Austria	Airport crash tender	7	Used on stationary bases
Mercedes Benz G270 CDI Work Löschwagen leicht 04		Germany	Airport crash tender	19	
Mercedes Benz G270 CDI Work Zubringerwagen leicht 05		Germany	Feeder vehicle	10	

=== Former equipment ===
Former used radar systems

- FLORIDA Airspace monitoring and management system- US origin – 1970/2003
- SRF Airspace monitoring and management system- French origin – 1955/1970
- LGR-1 Radar- US origin – 1948/1955
- Target allocation radar TPS-1E- US origin Italian licensed – 1958/1989
- Super Fledermaus- Swiss origin – 1965/1977
- Fire control radar Mark VII- UK origin – 1958/1967

Former used anti-aircraft systems

- Oerlikon 20 mm cannon- Swiss origin – 1937/1992 (L Flab Kan 37)
- Oerlikon 20 mm cannon- Swiss origin – 1954/1995 (L Flab Kan 54 Oe)
- Bloodhound missile system- UK origin – 1964/1999 (Flab Lwf BL 64)

Some systems have also been offered by Swiss and foreign companies to be trialed by the Swiss Air Force but these have never been purchased.

- Fliegerabwehrpanzer 68 – Swiss origin – 1958/1964
- RSA missiles – Swiss origin – 1946/ 1958
- RSD 58 missiles – Swiss origin – 1952/1958
- RSE Kriens missiles – Swiss origin – 1958/1966
- MOWAG Shark – Swiss/UK origin – 1981/1983 with French Crotale missiles and the UK twin AAA Wildcat 2×30mm cannon.

==== Air demonstration teams ====
The Air Force has a number of aerobatic teams and solo display aircraft that are used to represent the Swiss Air Force at events around Europe:

- Patrouille Suisse – An aerobatic team originally formed in 1964 with four Hawker Hunters, since 1996 used six Northrop F-5E in a red and white livery; the aircraft have been fitted with smoke generators.
- PC-7 Team – A turboprop display team using nine Pilatus PC-7s turboprop trainers.
- Hornet Solo Display – A single F/A-18 Hornet.
- Super Puma Display – A single Eurocopter AS332 Super Puma.
- Parachute Reconnaissance Company 17 performs parachute displays as the "Air Show Team".

==== Aircraft serial numbering ====
Swiss military aircraft are identified by a role prefix and number, the prefix or code identifies the role and the serial numbers the type or variant, the system was introduced in 1936.

Aircraft role identification code
Code letter	Role	Example
A	Ausbildung = Trainer	Pilatus PC-21: A-101
B	Bomber	De Havilland D.H.98 Mosquito: B-5
C	Cible = Target	Pilatus PC-9: C-403
D	Drohne = Drone	ADS-95: D-108
J	Jäger = Fighter	F/A-18C: J-5001
KAB	Kampfbeobachtung = "Battlefield observation"	Hiller UH-12: KAB-101
R	Reconnaissance	Diamond DA42: R-711
T	Transport	Dassault Falcon 900: T-785
U	Umschulung = "Advanced trainer"	BAe Hawk: U-1251
V	Verbindung = Liaison	Pilatus PC-6: V-622
Z	Zieldrohne = Target drone	Farner/RUAG KZD-85: Z-30

This is followed by a number having from two to four digits

In four digit numbers, the first digit identifies the aircraft type. The next three are the sub-type and individual aircraft, with the first and sometimes second for the subtype; and the third and sometimes fourth for the individual aircraft, In the following examples, "x" identifies the individual aircraft:

- Mirage IIIBS = J-200x
- Mirage IIIDS = J-201x
- Mirage IIIRS = R-21xx
- Mirage IIIC = J-22xx
- Mirage IIIS = J-23xx
- F-5E = J-30xx (serials previously used for the FFA P-16)
- F-5F = J-32xx
- F/A-18C = J-50xx
- F/A-18D = J-52xx

3 digit numbers Most aircraft have three numbers. These follow a broadly similar pattern to the four-digit numbers, although there are exceptions.

Transport aircraft have a first digit of 3 for helicopters and 7 for fixed wing aircraft.

2 digit numbers Target drones have only two numbers.

Radio callsigns

- Bambini-Code – a tactical radio code used from the 1940s to the 1990s

== Bibliography ==
- Force Report: Swiss Air Force, Air Forces Monthly magazine in association with Air Forces Intelligence – The Online Air Arms Database, September 2009 issue.
- Andrade, John (1982). Militair 1982. London: Aviation Press. ISBN 0-907898-01-7.
- Lombardi, Fiona (2007). The Swiss Air Power: Wherefrom? Whereto?. Zurich University. ISBN 978-3-7281-3099-0.
- Owers, Colin (Spring 1994). "Fokker's Fifth: The C.V Multi-role Biplane". Air Enthusiast. No. 53. pp. 60–68. ISSN 0143-5450.
- Roman Schürmann: Helvetische Jäger. Dramen und Skandale am Militärhimmel. Rotpunktverlag, Zürich 2009, ISBN 978-3-85869-406-5.
- Armasuisse Centauer, AT: Diamond Air, archived from the original on 2014-02-03.
