= Bambini-Code =

Brevity code used by the Swiss Air Force

The Bambini-Code was a brevity code used for tactical radio voice communications by the Swiss Air Force (SAF). It was developed by the SAF during World War II and was used until 1998. It is sometimes referred to as the "fifth national language" of Switzerland.

== History ==
The code was developed from the need to communicate via poor-quality radio links in the noisy environment of the aircraft then in service with the SAF. It was used by the SAF from around the start of the Second World War until 1998.

As the SAF started to have regular communications with foreign air forces in Switzerland and abroad, the Bambini-Code was no longer suitable. For example, with the retirement of the Hawker Hunter from SAF service in 1994, SAF pilots in the United States learning to fly its replacement the McDonnell Douglas F/A-18 Hornet found they could not be understood when using the Bambini-code. So in 1998 the SAF changed to the NATO standard multiservice tactical brevity code. This was also at the time the SAF switched from using the metric system of measurement to the Imperial units of feet and miles per hour, although it kept the use of litres rather than gallons as the measurement unit for fuel. The NATO Brevity Code is now the standard code for the SAF at any time.

== Code words ==
The Bambini-code comprised a vocabulary of about 500 words.

The code words were chosen so that they were phonetically as clear and distinct as possible. Vowel-rich words meet this requirement best and Italian words tend to have this characteristic, so many of the codewords sound Italian. For example, "Bambini" is the Italian for "Children".

=== Examples of code words ===
Some of the words are given below with their meanings in English.

- Addio = Dispersal, disengagement
- ALA = Flaps
- Alarme = Alarm
- Altezza = Altitude above sea level in hectometers
- Alto = Top, high
- Angeli = Friendly aircraft (Ängeli is Swiss German for little angel)
- Atlanta = West
- Attaco ident numero = Tactical attack to read the aircraft Serial No.
- Attaco ident Timonella = Tactical attack to force an aircraft to land
- Attaco Siwa = Attack with Sidewinder missile
- Attendez = Wait
- Attendez campo = Wait on the airfield
- Avanti = Start attack, attack curve
- Aviso = Message, information
- Bambini = All our aircraft
- Basso = Below
- Bello = Friendly aircraft are safe
- Bibi = Fighter
- Bingo = Fuel remaining on reserve
- Camille = Fuel at 1000 lbs / l
- Campari = Fuel (Campari is an Italian apéritif).
- Campo = Airfield, base
- Capito = Understood
- Carello = Landing gear (caRrello is Italian both for shopping trolley and landing gear)
- Casino = Home base
- Clearance = Release, authorization
- Colonna = Column
- Color = Landing lights
- Condor = Unidentified aircraft
- Conditione = Weather conditions
- Corso = Compascurs
- Demitour = Reverse curve
- Descenze = Descent
- Diaboli = Enemy aircraft
- Domanda = Request
- Finale = Final approach
- Finito = End of the radio traffic, closed end
- Formazione grande = Wide formation
- Formazione picco = Close formation
- Gardez = Watch it, watch
- Inferno = Rain
- In posizione = In position
- In siesta = In peace
- Lago = Lake, water
- Libero = Not used, free
- Lili = Left
- Lilitour = Turn 90° left
- Mekka = East
- Meteo = Weather
- Montare Pece = Maximum afterburner climb
- Montare sec = Climb at full throttle
- Nase = straight ahead (Nase is German for nose)
- Nobis = No
- Nobis capitonnage = Not understood
- Norwega = North
- Partenza = Start, departure
- Pece = Afterburner
- Piano = Slow, slower
- Piccolo = Little, small
- Positione = Location
- Possibile = Probably
- Positione = Partenza location
- Pressione = Speed
- Presto = Fast, faster
- Pronto = Ready
- Rendezvous = Meeting time
- Repetez = Repeat the message
- Rera = Right
- Reratour = Turn 90° right
- Reravolte = right turn
- Riposo = Land
- Riposo direkt = Direct approach
- Risponde = Reply
- Ritorno = Return
- Sec = Full throttle
- Silencium = Radio silence
- Siwa = AIM-9 Sidewinder missile
- Sopra = Over
- Stabilo = Back
- Stuka = Dive brakes ("Stuka" is an abbreviation of Sturzkampfflugzeug, the German term for a dive bomber)
- Subito = Immediately
- Sudan = South
- Timo Ella = Call for landing
- Tiralto = Pull command
- Touchez Repartenza = Touch-and-go landing
- Vista = View, sight
