= List of former units and aircraft of Celle Air Base =

This is a list of all former units and aircraft stationed at Celle Air Base – also named Immelmann-Kaserne (Immelmann-Barracks).

Current units and aircraft as well as detailed information about the base can be found at Celle Air Base.

== Units ==
Unit	Nation	Stationed						Successor
Unit	Nation	From		Former base	until		Later base	Successor
Flugschule (A-Schule)	Germany	Founded	1934	–	Renamed	1936	Celle	Flugschule (B–Schule)
Flugschule (B-Schule)	Germany	Renamed	1936	Celle	Renamed	1937	Celle	Flugschule (C–Schule)
Blindflugschule	Germany	Founded	1936	–	Moved	1937	Wesendorf	Blindflugschule
Flugschule (C-Schule)	Germany	Renamed	1937	Celle	Moved	1939	Leipzig	unknown
Sturzkampfgeschwader 77	Germany	Moved	1939	unknown (Poland)	Moved	1940	unknown (France)	Schlachtgeschwader 77
During World War II several units were stationed only briefly at the air base. No reliable information about these units are available yet.
Flugzeugführerschule A/B 6	Germany	Moved	1945	Gdańsk	Disbanded	1945	–	–
84 Group / 34. Wing Royal Air Force	United Kingdom	unknown	1945	unknown	unknown	1957	–	–
226 Signal Squadron Royal Corps of Signals	United Kingdom	unknown	1945	unknown	unknown	1957	–	–
No. 51 Squadron RAF Regiment	United Kingdom	unknown	1945	unknown	unknown	1957	–	–
No. 2 Squadron RAF	United Kingdom	unknown	1945	unknown	unknown	1946	–	–
No. 4 Squadron RAF	United Kingdom	unknown	1945	unknown	unknown	1945	–	–
No. 16 Squadron RAF	United Kingdom	unknown	1945	unknown	unknown	1946	–	–
No. 41 Squadron RAF	United Kingdom	moved	16-4-45	Twente NL	moved	9-5-45	Kastrup DK	–
No. 130 Squadron RAF	United Kingdom	moved	16-4-45	Twente NL	unknown	1945	–	–
No. 137 Squadron RAF	United Kingdom	unknown	1945	unknown	unknown	1945	–	–
No. 268 Squadron RAF	United Kingdom	unknown	1945	unknown	unknown	1945	–	–
No. 350 Squadron RAF	United Kingdom	moved	16-4-45	Twente NL	unknown	1945	–	–
No. 414 Squadron RAF	United Kingdom	unknown	1945	unknown	unknown	1945	–	–
No. 486 Squadron RAF	United Kingdom	unknown	1945	unknown	unknown	1945	–	–
No. 652 Squadron RAF	United Kingdom	unknown	1946	unknown	unknown	1956	–	–
317th Troop Carrier Wing (Hvy)	United States	Moved	1948	Tachikawa, (Japan)	Moved	1949	Frankfurt	–
39th Troop Carrier Squadron	United States	Moved	1948	Wiesbaden	Disbanded	1949	–	–
40th Troop Carrier Squadron	United States	Moved	1948	Wiesbaden	Disbanded	1949	–	–
41st Troop Carrier Squadron	United States	Moved	1948	Wiesbaden	Disbanded	1949	–	–
No. 11 Squadron RAF	United Kingdom	unknown	1949	unknown	unknown	1950	–	–
No. 14 Squadron RAF	United Kingdom	unknown	1949	unknown	unknown	1950	–	–
No. 98 Squadron RAF	United Kingdom	unknown	1949	unknown	unknown	1950	–	–
No. 16 Squadron RAF	United Kingdom	unknown	1950	unknown	unknown	1957	–	–
No. 93 Squadron RAF	United Kingdom	unknown	1950	unknown	unknown	1952	–	–
No. 94 Squadron RAF	United Kingdom	unknown	1950	unknown	unknown	1957	–	–
No. 145 Squadron RAF	United Kingdom	unknown	1952	unknown	unknown	1957	–	–
OL6 601st AC&W Squadron	United States	Founded	1956	–	Disbanded	1966	–	–
Flugplatzkommando (H) 846	Germany	Founded	1957	–	Disbanded	1957	Celle	Heeresfliegerstaffel
Flugplatzkommando (H) 847	Germany	Founded	1957	–	Disbanded	1957	Celle	Heeresfliegerstaffel 1
Flugplatzkommando (H) 848	Germany	Founded	1957	–	Disbanded	1957	Celle	Heeresfliegerstaffel
Heeresfliegerstaffel	Germany	Founded	1957	–	Renamed	1967	Celle	Flugplatzkommando (H) 422
Heeresflieger Staffel 813	Germany	Moved	1957	Fritzlar	Disbanded	1959	Celle	Heeresfliegerstaffel 1
Heeresflieger Staffel 814	Germany	Founded	1957	–	Moved & Renamed	1957	Itzehoe	Heeresfliegerstaffel 6
Heeresflieger Staffel 815	Germany	Founded	1957	–	Disbanded	1957	Celle	Heeresfliegerstaffel 1
Heeresfliegerstaffel 1	Germany	Founded	1957	Celle	Moved & Renamed	1959	Oberschleißheim	Heeresfliegerstaffel (Gebirge) 8
Heeresfliegertransportstaffel 823	Germany	Founded	1957	–	Renamed	1959	Celle	Heeresfliegertransportstaffel 103
Heeresfliegerstaffel 1	Germany	Founded	1959	Celle	Disbanded	1964	Celle	Heeresfliegerbataillon 11
Heeresfliegertransportstaffel 103	Germany	Renamed	1959	Celle	Moved	1961	Rheine	Heeresfliegertransportstaffel 823
Flugabwehrbatterie 30	Germany	Founded	1959	–	Renamed	1962	Celle	Flugabwehr(L)batterie 90
Lufttransportgeschwader 62	Germany	Founded	1959	–	Moved	1960	Cologne	unchanged
Lufttransportgeschwader 63	Germany	Founded	1960	–	Moved	1967	Hohn	unchanged
Heeresfliegerstaffel 7	Germany	Moved	1961	Rheine	Disbanded	1968	Celle	Heeresfliegerbataillon 7
Flugabwehr(L)batterie 90	Germany	Renamed	1962	Celle	Disbanded	1967	Celle	–
Heeresfliegerausbildungskompanie 432	Germany	Founded	1962	–	Disbanded	1971	Rotenburg	Heeresfliegerausbildungskompanie 432
Drohnen Lehr- und Versuchsgruppe	Germany	Founded	1963	–	Renamed	1969	Celle	Drohnen Lehr- und Versuchsstaffel
Heeresfliegerbataillon 11	Germany	Founded	1964	Celle	Disbanded	1971	Celle	Heeresfliegerregiment 10, Heeresfliegerstaffel 11
Flugplatzkommando (H) 422	Germany	Renamed	1967	Celle	Renamed	1973	Celle	Heeresflugplatzkommandantur 101
Heeresfliegerinstandsetzungsstaffel 108	Germany	Moved	1967	Bückeburg	Disbanded	1971	Celle	Heeresfliegerregiment 10
Ausbildungskompanie Stabsdienst und Militärkraftfahrer 802	Germany	Founded	1967	–	Disbanded	1993	Celle	Kraftfahrausbildungszentrum Celle
Flugsicherungsstaffel Fernmelderegiment 81	Germany	Founded	1967	–	Disbanded	1991	–	–
73. Field Workshop (Aircraft) REME	United Kingdom	Founded	1968	–	Disbanded	1977	–	–
Heeresfliegerbataillon 7	Germany	Founded	1968	Celle	Disbanded	1971	Celle	Heeresfliegerstaffel 7
Drohnen Lehr- und Versuchsstaffel	Germany	Renamed	1969	Celle	Renamed	1973	Celle	Heeresfliegerversuchsstaffel
Heeresfliegerstaffel 11	Germany	Founded	1971	Celle	Moved	1972	Rotenburg	unchanged
Heeresfliegerstaffel 7	Germany	Founded	1971	Celle	Disbanded	1994	–	–
Heeresfliegerregiment 10	Germany	Founded	1971	–	Moved	1981	Faßberg	unchanged
Heeresfliegerversuchsstaffel	Germany	Renamed	1973	Celle	Moved & Renamed	1981	Bückeburg	Heeresfliegerversuchsstaffel 910
Heeresflugplatzkommandantur 101	Germany	Renamed	1973	Celle	Disbanded	1994	Celle	Heeresfliegerregiment 16
Heeresfliegerregiment 16	Germany	Founded	1979	–	Disbanded	2003	Celle	Heeresfliegerunterstützungsstaffel 14; Heeresfliegerverbindungs- und Aufklärungsstaffel 100; Heeresfliegerinstandsetzungsstaffel 100
Heeresfliegerausbildungsstaffel 8/I	Germany	Moved	1995	Rotenburg	Disbanded	2004	Celle	Heeresfliegerstaffel 109
Regionalfahrschule Technische Schule der Luftwaffe 1	Germany	Moved	2001	Faßberg	Disbanded	2003	–	–
Heeresfliegerunterstützungsstaffel 14	Germany	Founded	2002	Celle	Disbanded	2003	–	–
Heeresfliegerwaffenschule Ausbildungszentrum C	Germany	Founded	2002	–	Renamed	2007	Celle	Heeresfliegerausbildungszentrum C

== Aircraft ==
aircraft	Nation	Stationed	
aircraft	Nation	from	till
Heinkel He-45	Germany	1934	1938
Heinkel He-46	Germany	1934	1938
Heinkel He-72 „Kadett“	Germany	1934	1938
Focke Wulf Fw-44 „Stieglitz“	Germany	1934	1938
Focke Wulf Fw-56 „Stösser“	Germany	1934	1937
Arado Ar-96	Germany	1936	1937
Junkers W-33	Germany	1936	1937
Junkers W-34	Germany	1936	1937
Junkers Ju 52	Germany	1937	1939
Dornier Do 17	Germany	1937	1939
Junkers Ju-86	Germany	1937	1939
Heinkel He 111	Germany	1937	1939
Junkers Ju 87	Germany	1939	1940
During World War II several units where stationed only briefly at the air base. No reliable information about these units are available yet.
Junkers Ju 88 (Final assembly)	Germany	1944	1944
Bücker Bü-181	Germany	1945	1945
Fieseler Storch Fi-156	Germany	1945	1945
Arado Ar-96	Germany	1945	1945
Junkers W-34	Germany	1945	1945
Supermarine Spitfire	United Kingdom	1945	1946
Hawker Typhoon	United Kingdom	1945	1945
Hawker Tempest	United Kingdom	1945	1945
Auster V	United Kingdom	1946	1946
Douglas C-54 Skymaster	United States	1948	1949
De Havilland Mosquito	United Kingdom	1949	1950
De Havilland Vampire	United Kingdom	1950	1955
De Havilland Venom	United Kingdom	1954	1957
Dornier Do-27	Germany	1957	1970
Sikorsky H-34	Germany	1957	1970
Skeeter Mark 6	Germany	1958	1960
Aérospatiale Alouette II	Germany	1959	1994
Nord Noratlas	Germany	1961	1967
Bell UH-1D	Germany	1968	1981
Bölkow BO 105	Germany	1969	2016
