= No. 139 Wing RAF =

No. 139 Wing RAF
- Active: 1944-1947; 1947-1951; 1953-1957
- Country: United Kingdom
- Branch: Royal Air Force
- Role: ground attack
- Size: Wing

Aircraft flown
- Attack: Hawker Typhoon
- Bomber: North American Mitchell

No. 139 Wing RAF was a formation of the Royal Air Force during the Second World War. It comprised No. 320 (Netherlands) Squadron RAF, No. 98 Squadron RAF, No. 271 Squadron RAF and No. 416 Squadron RCAF.

On 6 June 1944 as part of No. 2 Group RAF with its headquarters at RAF Dunsfold, Surrey, it comprised 98, No. 180 Squadron RAF and 320 Squadrons, all with North American Mitchell Mk. IIs, supported by 6098, 6180 and 6320 Servicing Echelons, respectively.

It was active in three periods from 12 May 1944 to 31 October 1947 (Fighter Bomber); from 1 November 1947 to some point in 1951, possibly including 14 and 98 Squadrons at RAF Celle in Germany with No. 83 Group RAF, Second Tactical Air Force; and from 1 April 1953 to 1 December 1957 (as a bomber formation), possibly also at Celle. Both 94 and 145 Squadrons had arrived at Celle before 139 Wing had reformed in 1953, and flew Vampires and then Venoms until 1957.
