= Celle Air Base =

German Army air base at Celle

Celle Air Base Heeresflugplatz Celle (Advanced Landing Ground B-118)
- Celle, Lower Saxony in Germany
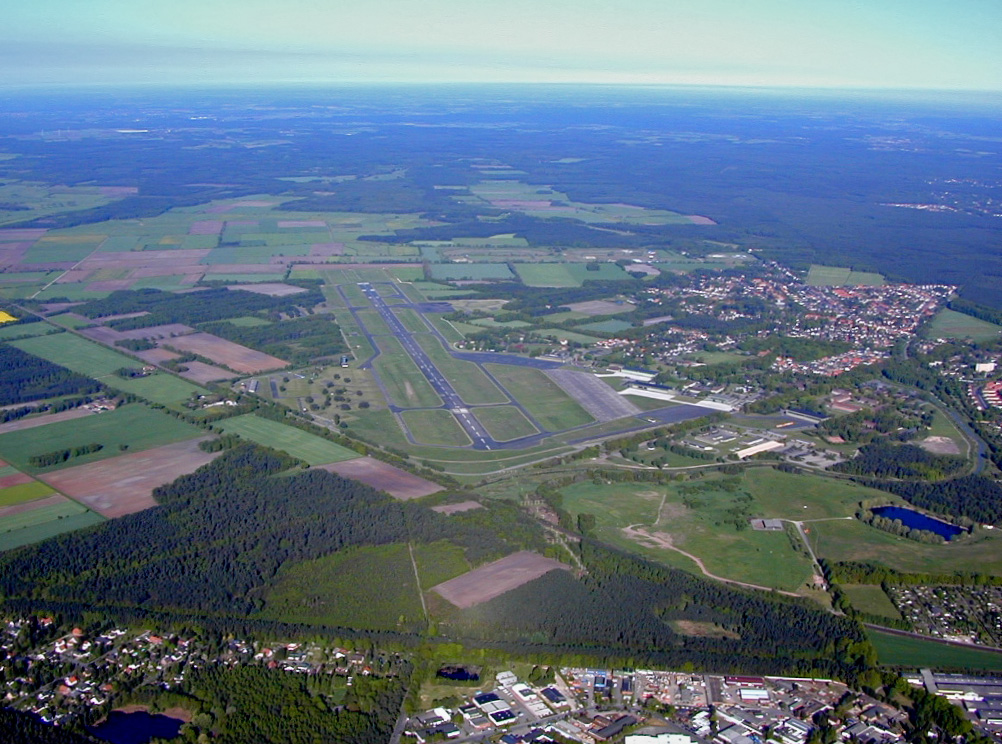

Site information
- Owner: Federal Ministry of Defence
- Operator: German Army
- Controlled by: German Army Aviation School; German Army Aviation Corps

Location
- Shown within Lower Saxony, Germany
- Coordinates: 52°35′28″N 010°01′20″E

Site history
- Built: 1934
- In use: 1934-1946

Garrison information
- Current commander: Lieutenant Colonel Grube

Airfield information
- Identifiers: ICAO: ETHC
- Elevation: 39 metres (128 ft) AMSL
Runways
Direction	Length and surface
08/26	1,831 metres (6,007 ft) Asphalt

Celle Air Base German: Heeresflugplatz Celle (ICAO: ETHC) is a military airbase of the German Army. The airfield is situated southwest of the city of Celle, Lower Saxony, Germany. It was opened in 1934 and has been in military use ever since. Today the aerodrome is used by a helicopter training school, a helicopter liaison and reconnaissance squadron and a helicopter maintenance unit utilising the type Bölkow Bo-105.

Until the end of World War II the airfield operated under the name of Fliegerhorst Celle-Wietzenbruch (Air Base Celle-Wietzenbruch). During Allied occupation it was known as RAF Celle. On 28 July 1967 the base was given the additional name Immelmann-Kaserne (Immelmann-Barracks).

== Location and approach ==
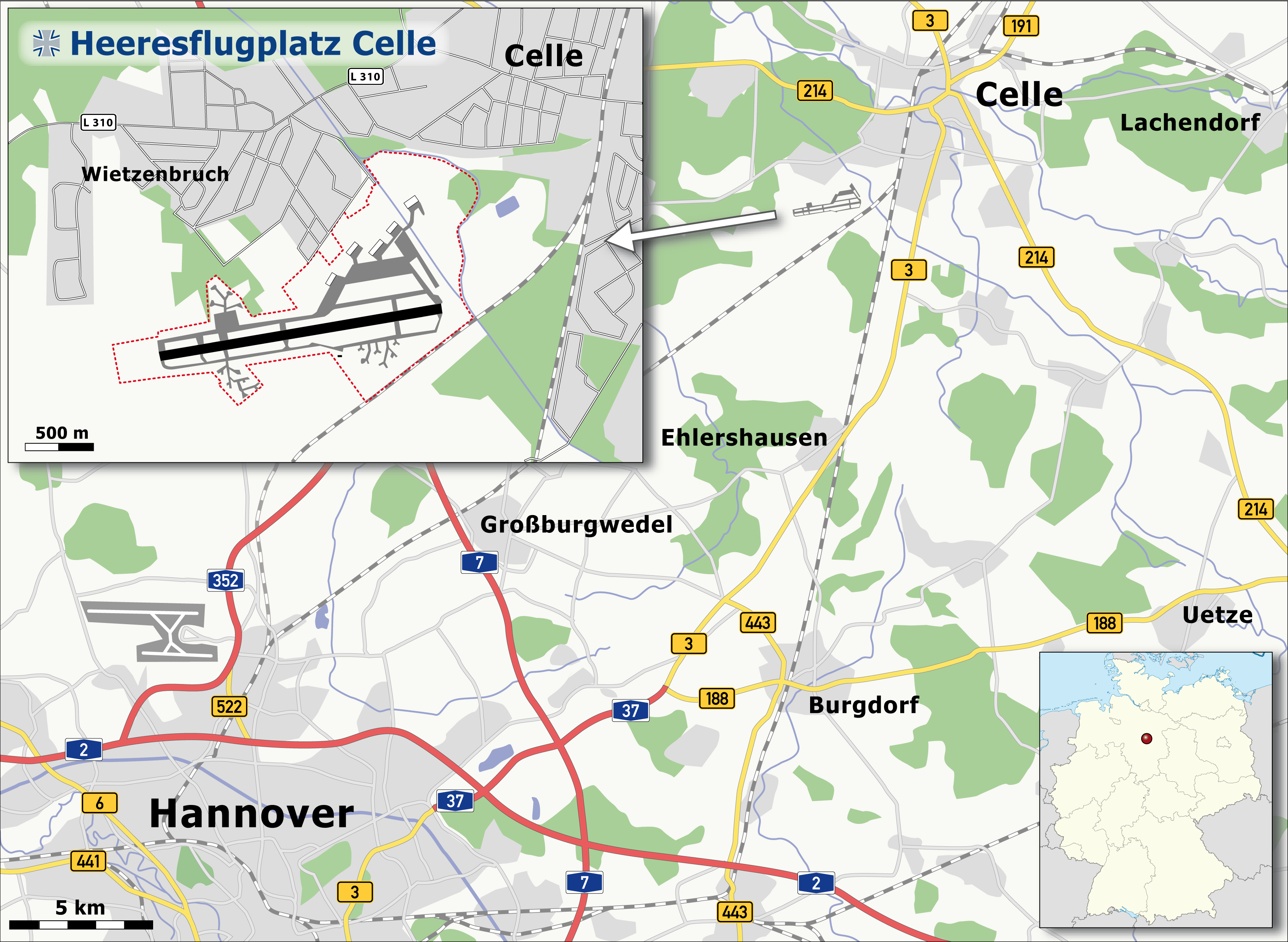
Map of Celle Air Base

Celle Air Base is located 2.7 miles (4.3 kilometres) southwest of the city centre of Celle and 18 miles (29 kilometres) northeast of the city centre of Hanover. To the west the Wietzenbruch is situated, a moor-like area named after the river Wietze and the surrounding fen. This geographical feature gave its name to the suburb "Wietzenbruch" directly to the north of the air base. To the east and the south it borders on the railway line Hanover-Hamburg. The field elevation at the reference point, the exact centre of the runway, is 129 feet (39 metres) above sea level.

Celle Air Base can be approached by way of a connecting road to the Landesstraße 310 which is used as a spur route to the motorways A 7 and A 352. Apart from by motorway, Celle as well as the air base can be approached by federal highways B3, B 191 and B 214. Since 2006 a bus stop called "Wietzenbruch Kaserne" is located in front of the main gate of the base.

Organisationally, the air base is separated into barracks and air field. The entire base is a military security area and completely surrounded by a fence and thus not open to the general public. Admittance to the barracks area is granted to members of the Bundeswehr and Allied forces. In this part administrative, social, sports and medical facilities, and the quarters are situated. The air field is especially fenced in and contains the movement area, aprons and hangars as well as facilities for operating the airfield (radar, tower and point obstruction lights). Like on civil aerodromes access to this part is granted only for employees working there, crew members and passengers.

== History ==
=== Early history of aviation around the city of Celle ===
In 1910 flight trials were undertaken on the Scheuener Heide, a heath north of the river Aller. These trials were carried out not on official but on private initiative by a person named Schlüter. Using an advertisement in the local paper, the population of Celle was invited to watch the spectacle. However, aviation around Celle did not assume any serious forms until the Imperial Navy decided to choose the location for the construction of an airfield in order to enable intermediate stops for flights between Wilhelmshaven and Kiel. The airfield was opened on 3 October 1918 and used extensively until the end of the World War I in November of the same year when news, spread by pilots, of the sailors' revolt and the beginning of the German Revolution reached Celle. This in turn led to revolt within the city of Celle itself on 7 November 1918.

After World War I the airfield was initially abandoned even though some flights took place in the 1920s. The site became more important once the Celle-Wietzenbruch flying school began to use the area as an external landing site in the mid-1930s. Today, part of this former airfield is incorporated into the civilian airfield Celle-Arloh and used for recreational purposes.

=== Wehrmacht 1933 until 1945 ===
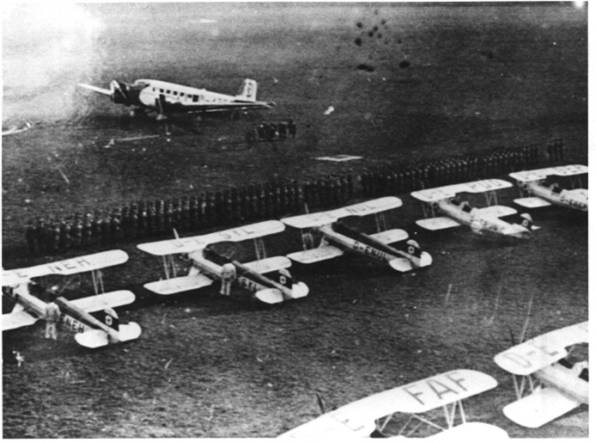
Parade formation of the flying school in 1935 with Junkers Ju 52, Focke-Wulf Fw 44 and Heinkel He 72.

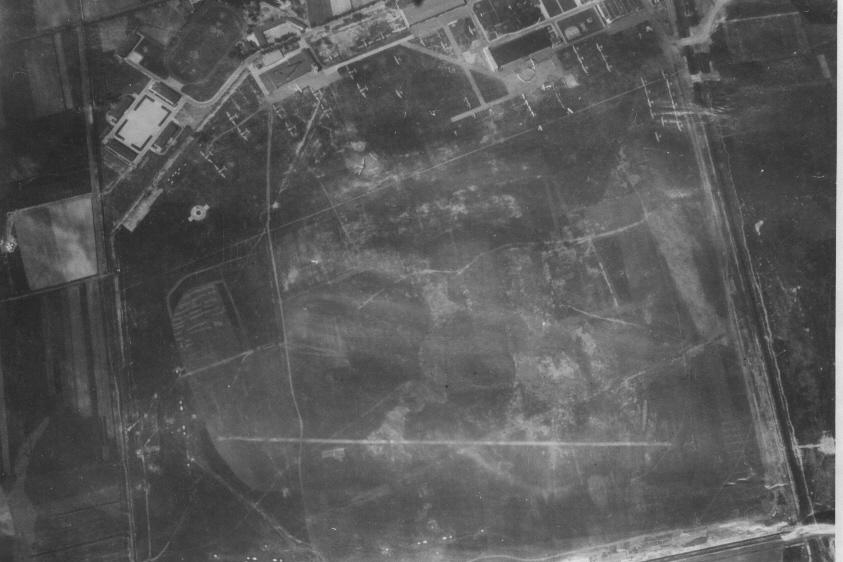
The airfield in 1935.

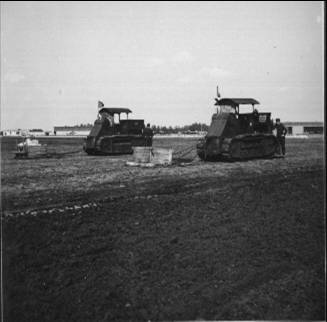
The subsurface of the airfield is mixed with bitumen in 1937.

The Treaty of Versailles in 1919 prohibited the German Reich to have her own air force. To get around this prohibition, the Nazi Party founded the Deutscher Luftsportverband (DLV or "German Air Sports Association") in 1933 as a disguise to accelerate the building of an air force. Therefore, throughout Germany possible locations for air bases were sought. One of these locations was close to the Celle district of Wietzenbruch. According to official information the Deutsche Verkehrsfliegerschule GmbH (German General Aviation School Ltd.) would become the airport holder. Ernst Sagebiel a leading architect in air base design was put in charge of the building works.

After exhaustive construction works, during which the boggy terrain was drained by creating several ditches, the flying school entered service in 1934. Due to the boggy terrain the airfield had to be mixed with bitumen a few years later to prevent airplanes sinking in. This made the ground elastic and resulted in the pilots calling the airfield rubber meadow (Gummiwiese).

On 9 March 1935 Hermann Göring officially announced the existence of a German Air Force and the DLV was not needed any longer. The Luftwaffe was officially declared as being the occupant of the air base and its employees revealed themselves as being members of the armed forces by openly wearing uniforms.

In the course of time, the type of aircraft stationed at Celle became larger and larger and crews were trained on almost all current military aircraft. The extent of the training activities necessitated the construction of external landing strips at Hustedt and Scheuen. The training in blind flight, the precursor of instrument flight, even had to be moved to Wesendorf.

At the beginning of World War II the training school was relocated to Leipzig and Celle Air Base was used by varying units, none of which were stationed there for any long period of time.

Although some production facilities for the Junkers Ju 88 were placed in Hangar V, Celle Air Base played only a secondary role during World War II. This, together with skilful camouflaging of the hangars, prevented the air base from becoming a serious target for Allied tactical or strategic bombing. Contemporary witnesses reported an American fighter plane attacking Hangar V in 1944 until the anti-aircraft fire forced the pilot to abandon his aircraft.

Without having suffered any serious damage the air base was surrendered by a German NCO to the British Army on 11 April 1945. A few days previously, members of the last German unit stationed at Celle Air Base, Flying School A/B 6, had destroyed all remaining aircraft and left the base. Furthermore, a last Allied attack on the airfield on 9 April 1945 had not caused any serious damage to the airfield.

=== Allied occupation 1945 until 1957 ===
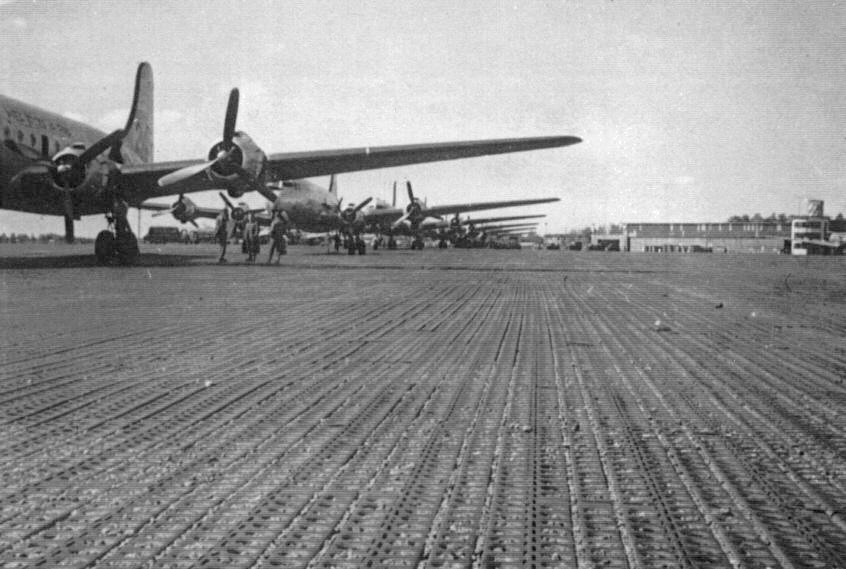
Douglas C-54 Skymaster preparing for the flight to Berlin in 1949

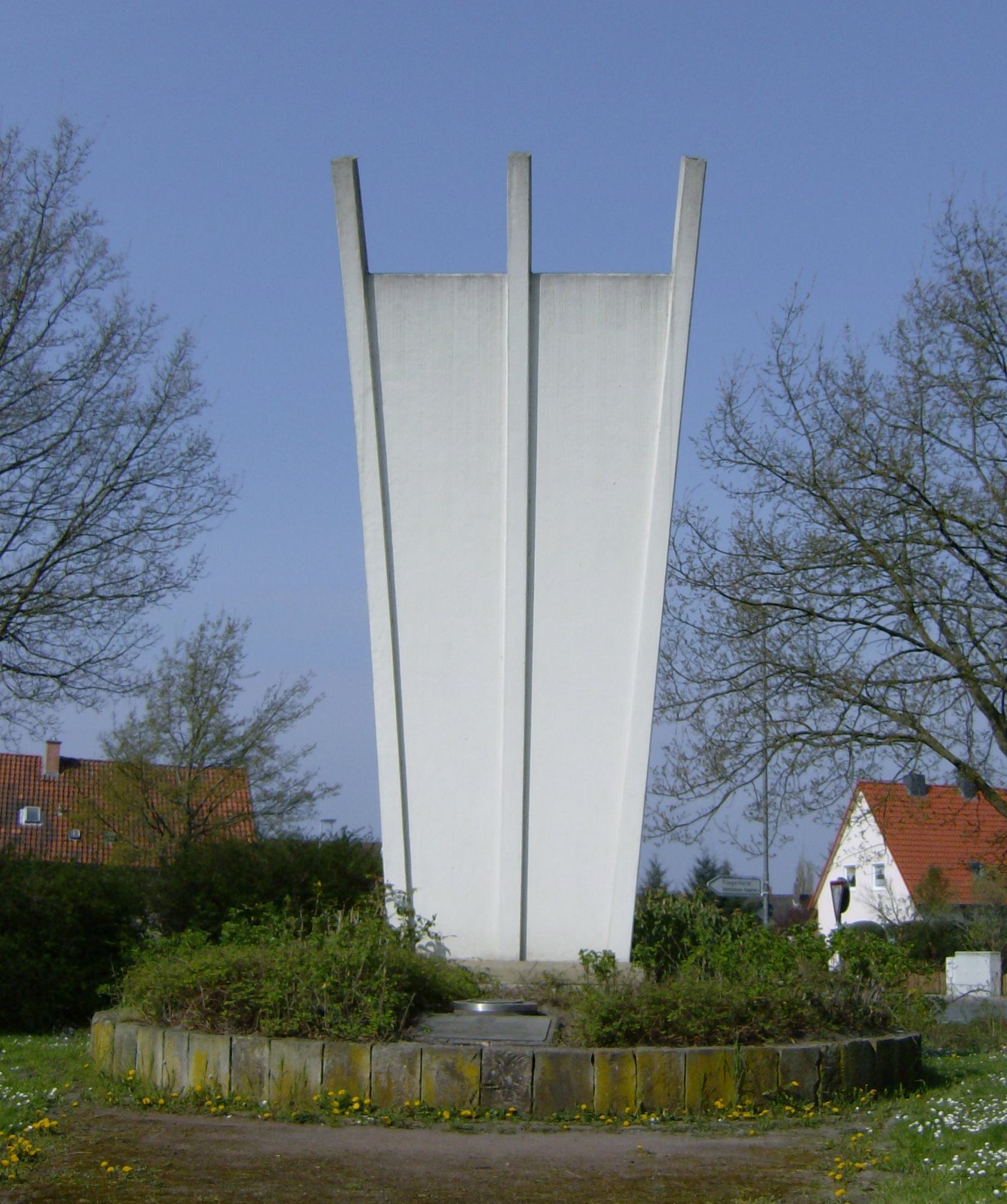
Airlift Memorial at the road leading to the air base

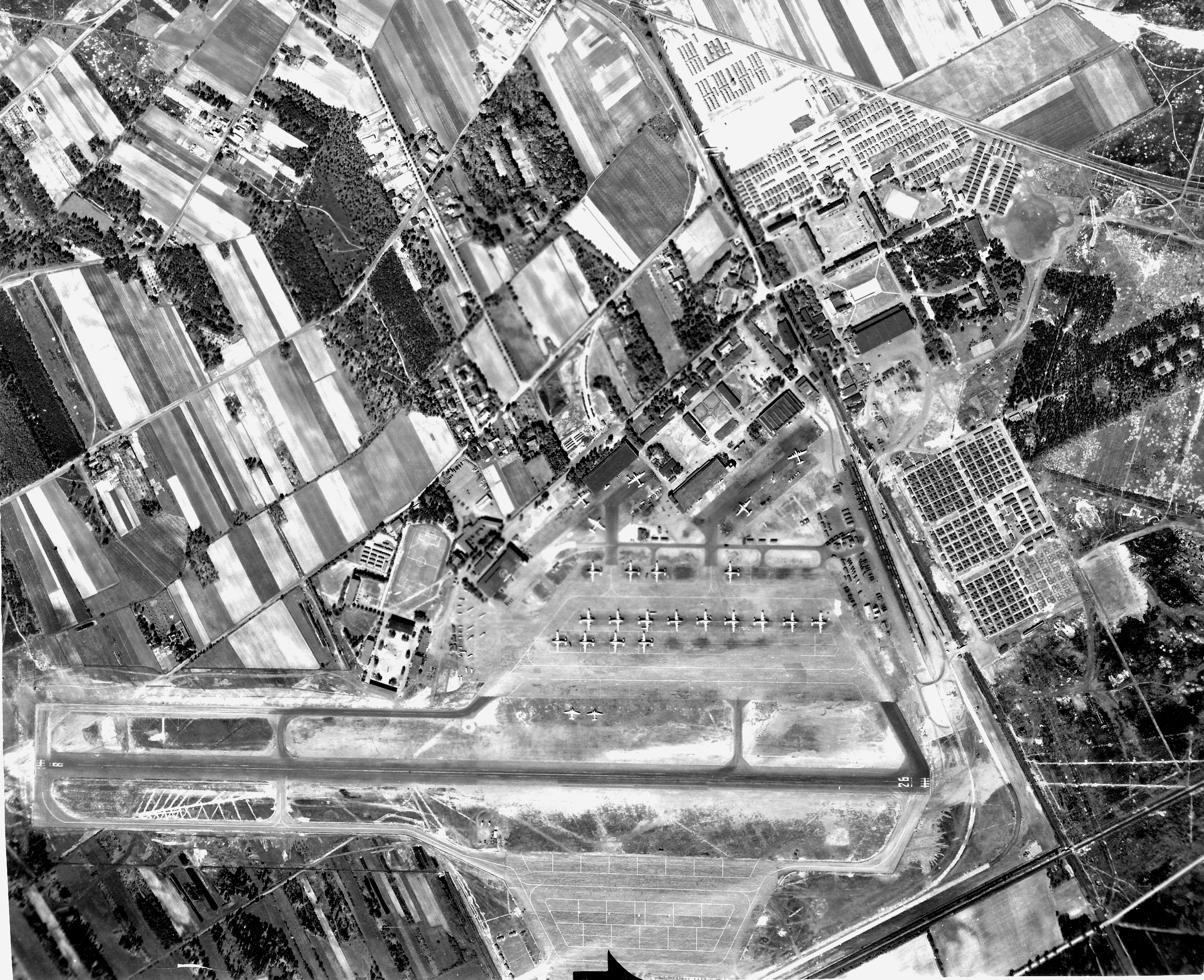
Aerial photograph of RAF Station Celle during the Berlin Airlift

After having been taken over by British forces, it came under the control of the Royal Air Force Germany and was renamed RAF Station Celle.

Under British occupation metal plates were laid on the entire airfield in order to enable the landing of larger aircraft. The airfield retained its secondary role and was mainly used for liaison flights to the United Kingdom. After some flight movements in 1945 and 1946, no flights were recorded in 1947 and the hangars were instead used as storage facilities for furniture and tanks.

With the beginning of the Berlin Airlift in 1948 this, however, changed radically. The Western allies, the United States, the United Kingdom and France, were looking for additional air bases that could be utilised for the airlift. Strategically, Celle offered favourable conditions for supply flights being located at the end of the middle air corridor to Berlin and having the shortest distance to Berlin. Unlike other air bases, Celle was not completely handed over to the United States Air Force (USAF) but remained under the control of the Royal Air Force (RAF) even though the aircraft using the airfield were American.

After RAF Fassberg and RAF Wunstorf Celle became the third airfield in the region to serve in the airlift. USAF 317th Troop Carrier Group equipped with Douglas C-54 Skymaster were stationed on the air base at the end of 1948 and transported mostly coal to Berlin. In order to cope with the enormous traffic the airfield was extended, receiving an unusually long (about 300 metres) rail siding and, for the first time, a runway with an asphalt surface.

At the beginning of the airlift a total of 600 tons of freight were transported into the besieged city which increased to 1000 tons of coal and food each day in the spring of 1949. The American forces were assisted by 5,000 German workers in this undertaking. In order to house them, north of the barracks a huge housing area consisting of Nissen huts was built.

At the same time, Celle residents began to complain about the so-called "Veronikas″, German women attracted to the well paid soldiers. A public appeal by the city of Celle denounced the "women and girls who cause offence and outrage" amongst the population. The public outrage and repeated appeals for morality by local politicians in the local press became well known throughout Germany. Even a Stuttgart-based newspaper published an article about "Celle - an outraged city" on 14 February 1949.

Next to the road leading to Celle Air Base, a monument in memory of the support given by Celle to the Berlin Airlift was erected by the city of Celle in 1988.

Following the end of the Berlin Airlift in 1949, the airfield was again used exclusively by British Forces. Over the years several squadrons were stationed at Royal Air Force Station Celle which since 1950 were equipped with jet engined fighters, the Vampire and Venom.

Unit	Dates	Aircraft	Variant	Notes
No. 2 Squadron RAF	1945	Supermarine Spitfire	XIV	Stationed twice
No. 2 Squadron RAF	1946	Supermarine Spitfire	PR.19	
No. 4 Squadron RAF	1945	Hawker Typhoon	FR.1B	
No. 11 Squadron RAF	1949–1950	de Havilland Mosquito	FB.6	
No. 14 Squadron RAF	1949–1950	de Havilland Mosquito	B.35	No. 139 Wing RAF(?)
No. 16 Squadron RAF	1945–1946	Supermarine Spitfire	XIX, XIV and XVI	
No. 16 Squadron RAF	1950–1955	de Havilland Vampire	FB.5	
No. 16 Squadron RAF	1954–1957	de Havilland Venom	FB.1	
No. 41 Squadron RAF	1945	Supermarine Spitfire	XIV	
No. 93 Squadron RAF	1950–1952	de Havilland Vampire	FB.5	
No. 94 Squadron RAF	1950–1954	de Havilland Vampire	FB.5	
No. 94 Squadron RAF	1954–1957	de Havilland Venom	FB.1	
No. 98 Squadron RAF	1949–1950	De Havilland Mosquito	B.35	No. 139 Wing RAF(?)
No. 130 Squadron RAF	1945	Supermarine Spitfire	XIV	
No. 137 Squadron RAF	1945	Hawker Typhoon	Ib	
No. 145 Squadron RAF	1952–1954	de Havilland Vampire	FB.5	
No. 145 Squadron RAF	1954–1957	de Havilland Venom	FB.1	
No. 268 Squadron RAF	1945	Supermarine Spitfire	XIVe	Stationed twice
No. 350 (Belgian) Squadron RAF	1945	Supermarine Spitfire	XIV	
No. 414 Squadron RCAF	1945	Supermarine Spitfire	XIV	
No. 486 Squadron RNZAF	1945	Hawker Tempest	V	
No. 652 Squadron RAF	1946	Taylorcraft Auster	V	

A number of ground-based units were also present:

- No. 51 Squadron RAF Regiment
- 226 Signal Squadron, Royal Corps of Signals

The infrastructure for a renewed airlift, however, was kept in place and was constantly improved until German reunification. The runway was extended in the 1960s and an instrument landing system (ILS) for runway 26 was installed. At the end of the 1980s, shortly before the fall of the Berlin Wall, the rail siding received an extensive lighting system.

=== Bundeswehr 1957 until the present ===
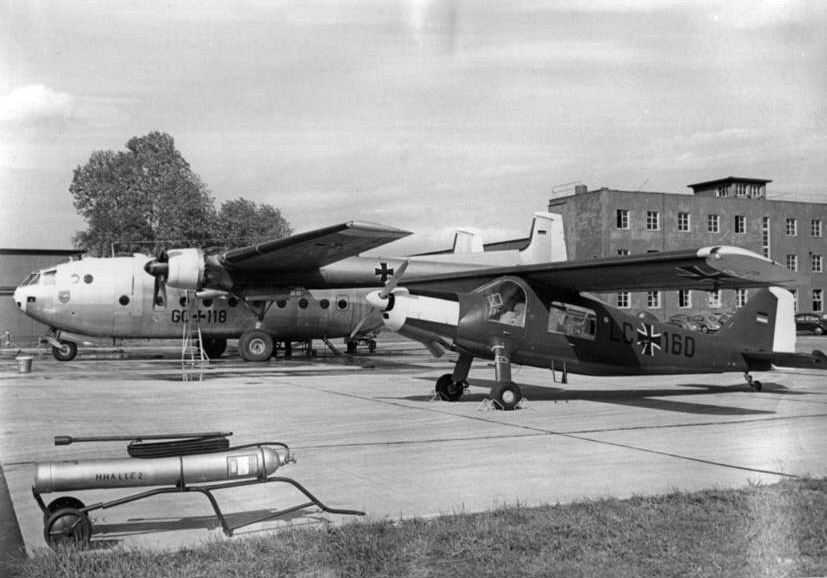
Nord Noratlas and Dornier Do-27 in front of Hangar II

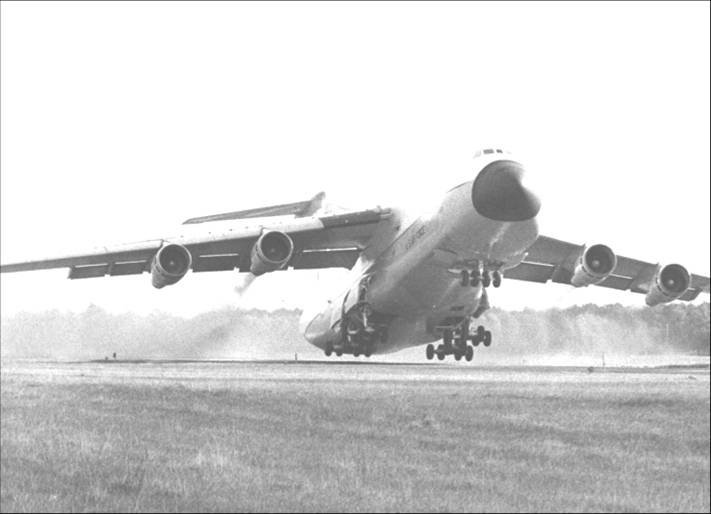
A Lockheed C-5 Galaxy. The aircraft flew men and material of the Drohnen-Lehr-und-Versuchsgruppe into the USA.

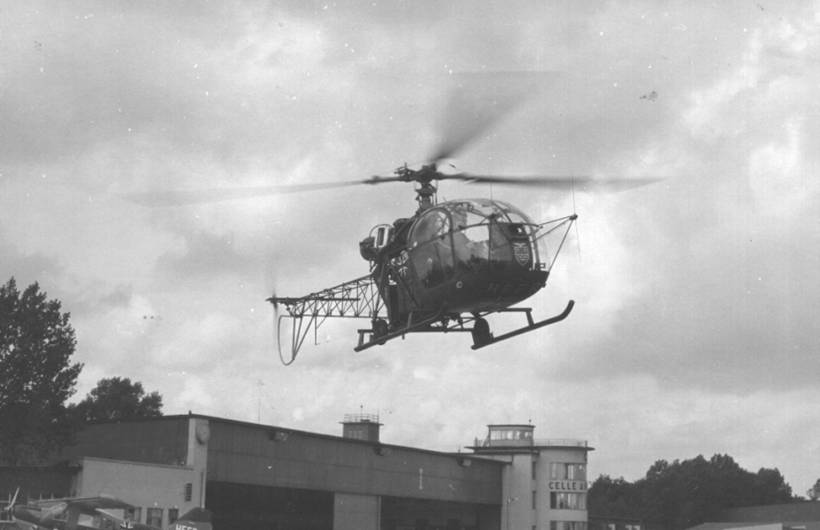
An Alouette II hovering in front of Hangar I. These types of helicopter together with the Bölkow Bo-105 PAH symbolised the Celle Air Base for three decades

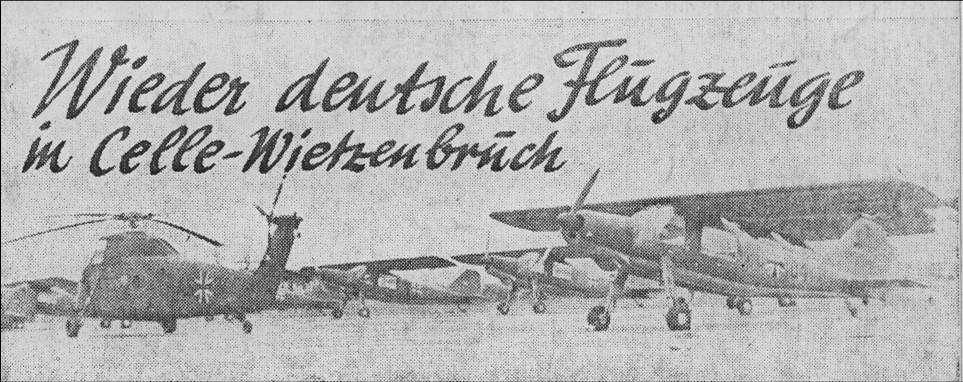
Headline of the newspaper "Hannoversche Presse" on 30 November 1957

One year after the foundation of the Bundeswehr the British forces handed over the airfield to the German Army on 29 November 1957. After Niedermendig and parallel to Fritzlar Celle was one of the first garrisons of the German Army Aviation Corps, at the time the youngest branch of the German armed forces, that stationed various units and aircraft at Celle Air Base throughout the following years.

Peculiarly, from 1959 until 1967 two transport wings of the German Air Force were also stationed at Celle. Thus Celle became a mixed base used by Army and Air Force – unique in the Bundeswehr until the 1990s. However, already in 1960 Lufttransportgeschwader 62 (Air Transport Wing 62) was relocated to Cologne Bonn Airport. Seven years later Lufttransportgeschwader 63 (Air Transport Wing 63) moved to its new base in Hohn, Schleswig-Holstein where it is still stationed.

Due to the tense situation during the building of the Berlin Wall a small unit of the National Guard of the United States was stationed at Celle Air Base in 1961 in case of a second Berlin Airlift.

Following the move of its transport wings, the German Air Force did not station any flying units at Celle Air Base. However, air traffic control (ATC) was provided by a mixed Army/Air Force unit until the 1990s. Apart from the stationary ATC unit, a mobile ATC unit existed in Celle which was equipped with a mobile tower, radar and other equipment to provide air traffic control services for specially allocated places, for example, on German motorways designed as emergency landing strips during the Cold War.

From 1959 until 1966, a US Air Force unit equipped with two MSQ-1A radars was stationed at Celle Air Base. This unit's tasks were to link into missiles of the type TM-61C (MGM-1 Matador) and guide them towards their target. For complete air coverage, especially eastwards, the unit at Celle was not necessary. In order to save costs this unit was disbanded in 1966.

Between 1963 and 1981 Celle was home to a test squadron for unmanned aerial vehicles and helicopters. This unit experimented with helicopters and other weapon systems intended for acquisition by the Bundeswehr. One example of successful testing and bringing into service is the Bölkow Bo-150 in the version as anti-tank helicopter.

The unit being stationed the longest at Celle was the Heeresfliegerstaffel 7 (Army Aviation Squadron 7). It was relocated from Rheine to Celle in 1971. In 1968 it had become a battalion but three years later, on its move to Celle, it was redesignated again as a squadron. The unit was equipped with the Alouette II liaison and reconnaissance helicopter and was disbanded in 1994.

At the beginning of the 1970s the strength of the German Army Aviation Corps considerably increased when more manpower and material was allocated to it. In Celle Heeresfliegerregiment 10 (Army Aviation Regiment 10) equipped with Bell UH-1D was the first of these larger units, which would become the new standard.

In 1979 a second regiment, Heeresfliegerregiment 16 (Army Aviation Regiment 16), equipped with anti-tank helicopters was founded at Celle. Since the air base was too small to house two regiments, Heeresfliegerregiment 10 subsequently relocated to Faßberg Air Base in 1981. Its coat of arms still shows the stylised Celle Castle.

After the end of the Cold War Celle Air Base's ability for instrument flights was removed and the emergency landing strips on the motorways were abandoned. Following the removal of ILS as well as approach radar and the corresponding reduction within the ATC unit, the German Air Force finally left the base. Several smaller units were disbanded or relocated and only the Heeresfliegerregiment 16 remained as a flying unit at Celle.

Within the framework of the restructuring of the German Army and in preparation of the introduction of the new helicopter types NH-90 and Tiger in 2002 and 2003, Heeresfliegerregiment 16 was disbanded and parts of the Heeresfliegerwaffenschule (German Army Aviation School), originally located at Bückeburg Air Base, were moved to Celle. At the same time the Heeresfliegerverbindungs- und Aufklärungsstaffel 100 (Army Aviation Liaison and Reconnaissance Squadron 100) and the Heeresfliegerinstandsetzungsstaffel 100 (Army Aviation Maintenance Squadron 100) were founded.

With the commencement of training flights, Celle Air Base regained instrument flight ability and Bell UH-1D helicopters were again stationed on the air base.

Since having been taken over by the German Army Aviation Corps, hardly any new buildings were erected on the air base. Some had to be pulled down due to their dilapidated state or due to environmental issues: a kitchen and dining room from the time of the Berlin Airlift (the so-called Berlin Küche), the cinema, swimming pool and a petrol depot. Others have been and are being renovated and rebuilt, altering their function completely.

In October 2011 the German Federal Ministry of Defence announced a reorganisation/reduction of the German Armed Forces. As a result, Army Aviation Training Centre C will be closed and Army Aviation Liaison and Reconnaissance Squadron 100, Army Aviation Maintenance Squadron 100 and Army Aviation Squadron 109 will be disbanded. The Medical Services Squadron will be expanded into a regional medical centre. A battalion of aspirant non-commissioned officers will be based at Celle, and a centre for airborne operations will be established. However, the number of military personnel stationed at Celle Air Base will be significantly reduced from 1080 to 400.

Disaster relief

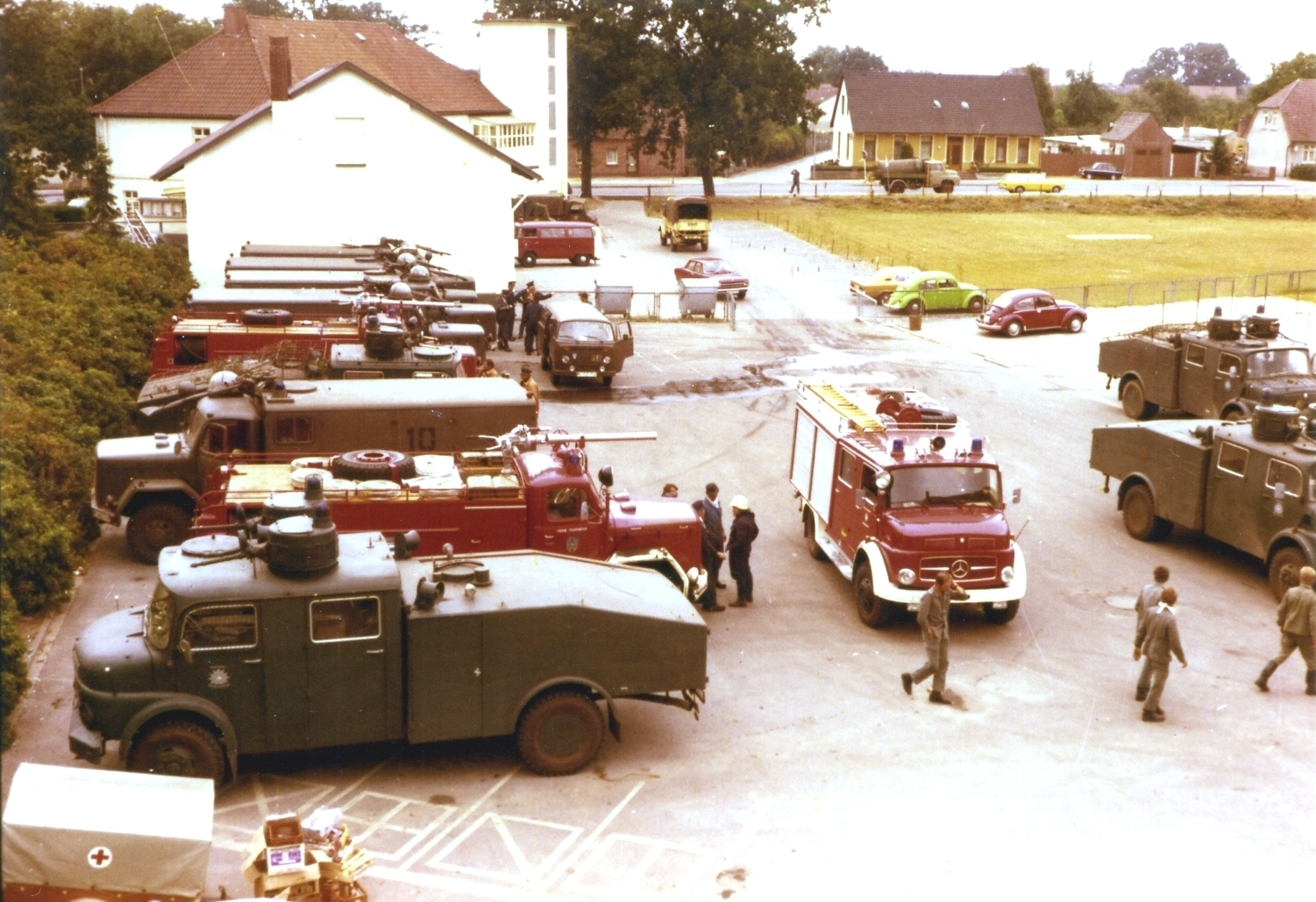
Fire engines of the Bundeswehr, the Bundesgrenzschutz and volunteers at the town Eschede

In accordance with the Basic Law for the Federal Republic of Germany statutory tasks within the borders of Germany are exclusively reserved for the German police. Only in case of an officially declared civil state of emergency is the German Army is permitted to act within the borders of Germany. Up until now there have been seven cases in which soldiers of Celle Air Base participated in such internal missions.

During the North Sea flood of 1962 evacuation and supply flights particularly in Hamburg and its surrounding areas were performed using the Sikorsky H-34 of the Heeresfliegertransportstaffel 823 (Army Aviation Transport Squadron 823).

In 1975 during the catastrophic wildfire on the Lüneburg Heath the Heeresfliegerregiment 10 used its Bell UH-1D helicopters with "Smokeys", water-filled containers hung under the helicopters, for fighting the conflagration. The ground forces of the air base, particularly the airfield fire fighters, also came to the assistance of the emergency services.

In the winter of 1978/1979 severe weather conditions resulted in a disastrous blizzard affecting the whole of northern Germany. Air traffic control at Celle Air Base in particular distinguished itself by providing around the clock radar assistance for the numerous rescue missions flown.

During the huge flooding of the river Oder in 1997 and the river Elbe in 2002 and 2006 several soldiers and equipment from Celle Air Base assisted in securing the dikes although at the air base itself normal business continued.

During the Eschede train disaster on 3 June 1998 Celle Air Base was given the task of coordinating the German Army's massive rescue and salvage operation by land and air. Two of the wrecked railway carriages, parts of the rails and all relevant bogies were stored in an empty hangar at Celle Air Base until the investigation into the cause of the accident was completed.

== Equipment ==
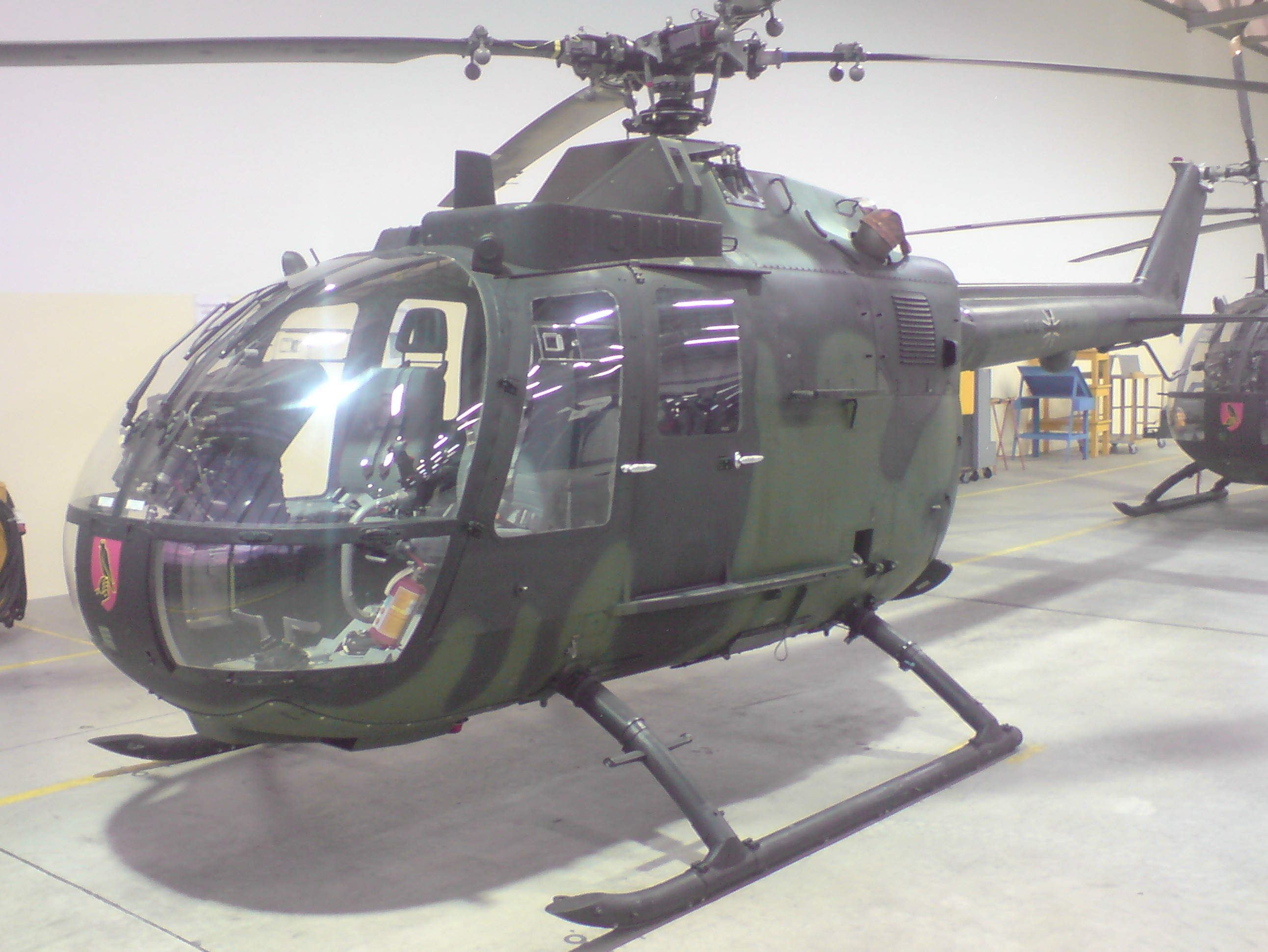
The Bölkow Bo-105 is the main mission- and training-helicopter at Celle Air Base

Celle Air Base is a controlled military airbase where visual and instrument flights are allowed. It is surrounded by a control zone of airspace class "D" which is active during the hours of operation. The area of responsibility is classified as "E".

Since the air base is mainly used as a training site for helicopter pilots, several grassy areas parallel to the runway are used for the training of emergency landing procedures, for example autorotation and engine failure.

In order to decrease the noise level for the inhabitants of Celle, the city having expanded towards the air base over the years, an additional helicopter training site at Scheuen (north of Celle) is used.

Celle Air Base is equipped with a non-directional beacon (Frequency: 311 KHz, Identification: CEL). This is used for approach and departure procedures of Celle as well as for the airports Hanover and Braunschweig-Wolfsburg and as a waypoint for two airways (J803 und T803) in radio navigation. Additionally, the airfield is equipped with a precision approach radar (PAR-80) and airport surveillance radar (ASR-910).

On the air base an Aeronautical Information Service, a section of the Met Office and a fire brigade are located. All services needed for national and international flights are kept available.

Celle Air Base is an airport of entry and can be flown to directly from abroad.

For parking and maintenance of aircraft five hangars are used. Each hangar may keep up to 24 helicopters. The apron offers space for about 40 aircraft of various types. Additional space is offered in the north-, the southwest- and southeast-spider. These are spider-like platforms for aircraft, partly covered with trees and bushes as during the Cold War. Most of these platforms are no longer in active use but can be activated for military exercises.

Jet fuel is provided by tank lorries. A subterranean refuelling station with filling abilities close to the taxiway is available but used only very occasionally.

Arresting gear is not available.

Heeresfliegerinstandsetzungsstaffel 100 (Army Aviation Maintenance Squadron 100) is a specialised unit and unique within the German Army. It performs the highest grade of maintenance for the helicopter Bölkow Bo-105 and is therefore responsible for all helicopters of this type used in the German Army. In contrast, the other units at Celle may perform only general maintenance for the Bölkow Bo-105 and Bell UH-1D. At present, other types of aircraft cannot be maintained but only served.

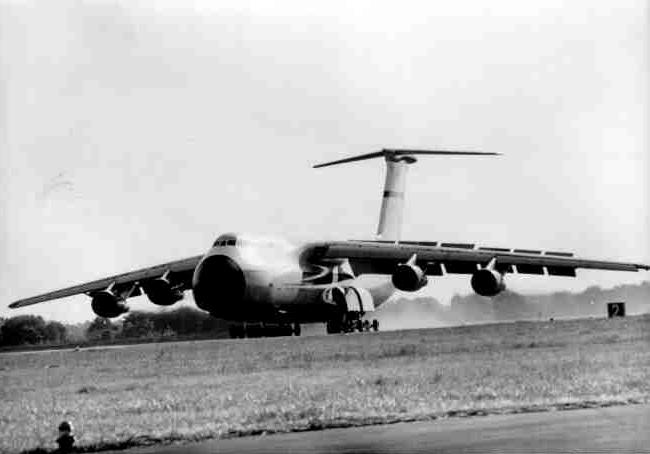
A Lockheed C-5 Galaxy landing at Celle Air Base on 3 August 1972

The dimensions of the runway generally allow landing and take-off of nearly all existing aircraft. Until now, the largest aircraft to land at and take off from Celle was a Lockheed C-5 Galaxy in 1972.

== Use ==
Being a military airbase within NATO Celle is generally available for aircraft of the German armed forces, Allied forces and the German Police but restricted by a so-called "PPR" (Prior Permission Request) regulation. This means that pilots intending to approach Celle need a permission prior to departure from their original base. This regulations aims to protect the population living near the airbase from noise pollution made by military aircraft.

For arrival and departure of civilian aircraft a prior request and permission in writing or a contract for using the airfield is needed, the exception being aircraft in distress.

Additionally to the flying and support units, other military units are based at Celle Air Base, using the military infrastructure but not necessarily need an airfield to perform their tasks.

=== Flying units ===
==== Aviation Training Centre C ====
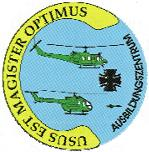
HFlgAusbZentr C

Celle Air Base is mainly used as a training airfield for prospective helicopter pilots and therefore part of the German Army Aviation School whose headquarters is in Bückeburg. The training by Army Aviation Training Centre C (Heeresfliegerausbildungszentrum C) is performed on Bell UH-1D and Bölkow Bo-105 and contains the following tasks:

- training of prospective pilots in simulated emergency situations such as engine failure, autorotation, failure of rear rotor and failure of hydraulic or other systems
- retraining of pilots who had piloted only other helicopter systems
- training of prospective flight instructors
- special helicopter courses
- training of own pilots
- disaster relief

Following the reorganisation/reduction of the German Armed Forces this unit will be disbanded.

=== Flight support units ===
==== Geo-Information Service Unit Celle ====
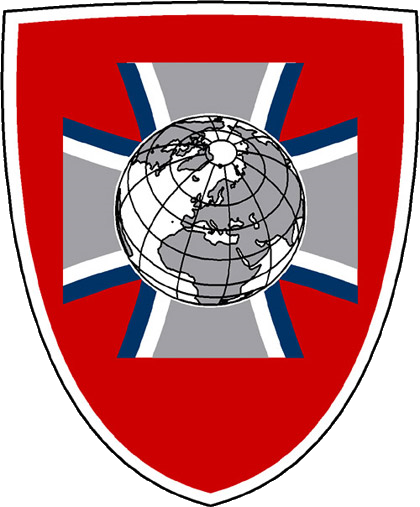
AGeoBw

The Geo-Information Service Unit Celle (Geoinformationsberatungsstelle Celle) functions predominantly as the local Met Office of Celle Air Base. The unit is responsible for weather information which is passed on to air traffic control, and weather forecasts for pilots. The unit is permanently on duty even when the airfield itself is closed. Around the clock weather observations are fed into a worldwide data system.

==== Celle Air Base Fire Services ====
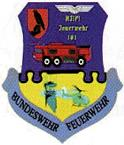
HFlPlFw Celle

Celle Air Base Fire Services (Heeresflugplatzfeuerwehr Celle) is given the task of fire fighting, rescuing and technical assistance on the air base. Celle Air Base Fire Services are on 24 hours stand-by even at times when the airfield is officially closed. In case of aviation accidents or emergency situations Celle Air Base Fire Services are responsible for coordinating and instigating the initial actions on the airfield and its immediate surroundings.

When the helicopter training site Scheuen is used for pilot training, a small contingent of fire fighters from Celle Air Base are temporarily stationed there.

==== Medical Services Squadron Celle-Wietzenbruch ====
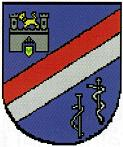
SanStff Celle-Wietzenbruch

Medical Services Squadron Celle-Wietzenbruch (Sanitätsstaffel Celle-Wietzenbruch) consisting of general practitioners and dentists supported by two flight surgeons, are responsible for the medical care of all soldiers stationed at Celle Air Base.

In case of aviation accidents or emergency situations the flight surgeons together with the fire services are responsible for the rescue of and attendance to victims.

==== Garrison Administrative Services ====
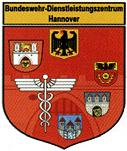
BwDLZ Hannover

German law stipulates a separation between military tasks and civil administration within the armed forces. The garrisons are administrated by a civilian force which is responsible for the facilities by ensuring technical standards, the general maintenance of the area and its buildings, and putting the base at the disposal of the military. The administrative force (Standortservice) is stationed at the garrison and is subordinate to the German Armed Forces Administrative Service Centre Hanover (Bundeswehrdienstleistungszentrum Hannover).

==== Military chaplaincy ====
Evangelische Militärseelsorge

Katholische Militärseelsorge

For spiritual welfare an ecumenical chapel is available which is used alternately by a Protestant minister and a catholic priest with services being held monthly. The official residence of the military chaplains (Militärseelsorger) is Hanover. They are part of the "psychosocial network of help" in cases of flight accidents and other incidents causing possible psychological trauma to the personnel involved. The network consists of flight surgeons, chaplains and members of the other social services of the German armed forces. The network attends to people affected by stressful situations related to flight incidents, their relatives as well as the rescue teams.

Facilities for other religious denominations are not available.

=== Non-flying units ===
==== Garrison commander ====
StOÄ Celle

The garrison commander (Standortältester Celle) is the official representative of the garrison of Celle towards the city and district of Celle as well as the local press. He functions as the contact person for the civil authorities particularly in cases where assistance from the armed forces is required and for disaster relief. The garrison commander supervises all units and barracks of the German Army at Celle Air Base and its immediate surroundings. He coordinates affairs of common interest, for example the use of military exercise areas and shooting ranges.

==== NCO for Reservist Liaisons ====
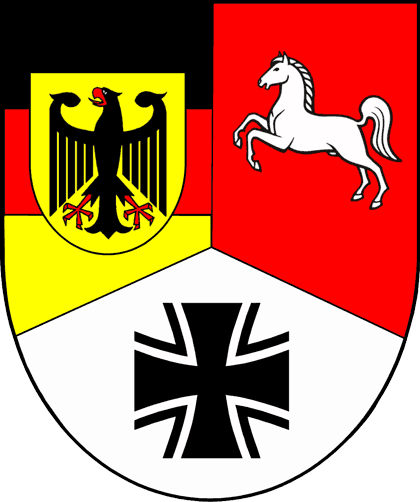
LKdo Nds

This is a small unit consisting of only one NCO (Feldwebel für Reservistenangelegenheiten). His responsibility is the liaison between the army and the army's reservists living in the districts Celle and Soltau-Fallingbostel, particularly the organisation of information and training events for former army personnel and to support them during reserve exercises. He keeps in close contact with the Association of Reservists of the German Armed Forces (Verband der Reservisten der Deutschen Bundeswehr).

The NCO for Reservist Liaisons is subordinate to Military Command Lower Saxony (Landeskommando Niedersachen).

==== Association of Reservists of the German Armed Forces ====
VdRBw

The Association of Reservists of the German Armed Forces (Verband der Reservisten der Deutschen Bundeswehr) is supported and financed by the state of Germany and attends to all matters concerning reservists on behalf of the German federal parliament. The association's office on the air base is responsible for the district of Celle. It works in close contact with the NCO for Reservist Liaisons and offers regular events for its members and publishes a biannual newsletter.

=== Disbanded units ===
==== Driving Instruction Centre Celle ====
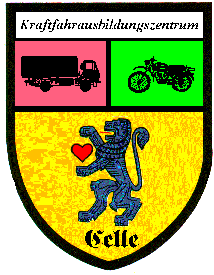
KfAusbZentr Celle

Regardless of their previous driving qualifications members of the German armed forces need an additional driver's licence before being allowed to use a military vehicle. The Driving Instruction Centre (Kraftfahrausbildungszentrum Celle) provided training for vehicles of the classes B and BCE as well as training for driving instructors.

On June 11, 2010, the last driving school graduates received their driving licenses during a ceremonial final roll call. On 31 December 2010 the Driving Instruction Centre Celle was disbanded. Its task will be taken over by other training centres.

==== Army Aviation Liaison and Reconnaissance Squadron 100 ====
HFlgVerbAufklStff 100

Army Aviation Liaison and Reconnaissance Squadron 100 (Heeresfliegerverbindungs- und Aufklärungsstaffel 100) performed liaison flights mainly throughout north and east Germany and took part in national and international exercises. Its tasks were:

- liaison flights between units of Airmobile Brigade 1 (Luftbewegliche Brigade 1) and other units of the German Army
- VIP-flights of military personnel and politicians
- performing own exercises and taking part in exercises of other units
- rescue and reconnaissance flights
- training of own pilots
- disaster relief

Following the reorganisation/reduction of the German Armed Forces this unit was disbanded.

==== Army Aviation Maintenance Squadron 100 ====
HFlgInstStff 100

Army Aviation Maintenance Squadron 100 (Heeresfliegerinstandsetzungsstaffel 100) was a specialised unit for maintenance of the Bölkow Bo-105. The squadron was unique within the German armed forces in that it was responsible for the entire fleet of this type of helicopter. Costly maintenance work, overhauls and repairs which units equipped with the Bölkow Bo-105 were not capable of carrying out, due to lack of either equipment or knowledge, were flown to Celle where the necessary repairs were performed. Afterwards the aircraft was returned to their home base.

Following the reorganisation/reduction of the German Armed Forces this unit was disbanded in 2013.

==== Army Aviation Squadron 109 ====
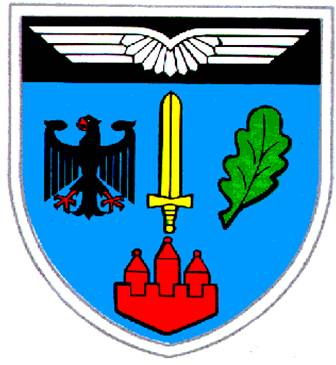
HFlgStff 109

Army Aviation Squadron 109 (Heeresfliegerstaffel 109) was the basic military training unit for volunteers. Additionally, the squadron provided specialist military courses for soldiers destined for missions abroad.

Soldiers of NCO rank intended to be used for guard duty received their theoretical and practical training in order to qualify as guard commander at Army Aviation Squadron 109.

Following the reorganisation/reduction of the German Armed Forces this unit was disbanded in 2013.

=== Other uses ===
Until the 1980s, members of the aristocracy, particularly of British provenience, as well as other persons of the public life used the possibility to land on a military airfield where journalists and photographers have no access. The most famous of these were the "Queen Mum" Elizabeth Bowes-Lyon in 1965, Queen Elizabeth II in 1967 and 1984, Prince Charles and Diana in 1987 as well as Princess Beatrix of the Netherlands in 1965.

Today Celle is only occasionally used by members of the British royal family for visits to the British troops stationed in Celle and Bergen or for cultivating the traditional relationship between the House of Windsor and Celle originating in Sophia Dorothea of Celle.

Due to the massive reduction of British forces in Germany and their redeployment out of Germany the importance of Celle for such visits has been decreasing since the 1990s. On average there are about three visits of this kind per year. Heads of states have not landed at Celle Air Base since 1984.

== Significance and future development ==
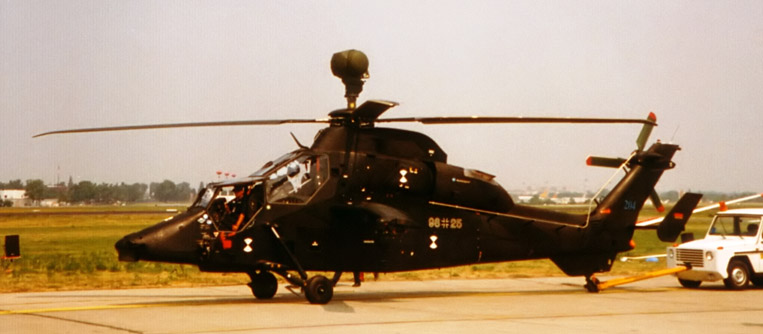
Eurocopter TIGER – This attack helicopter replaced the Bölkow Bo-105 PAH 1

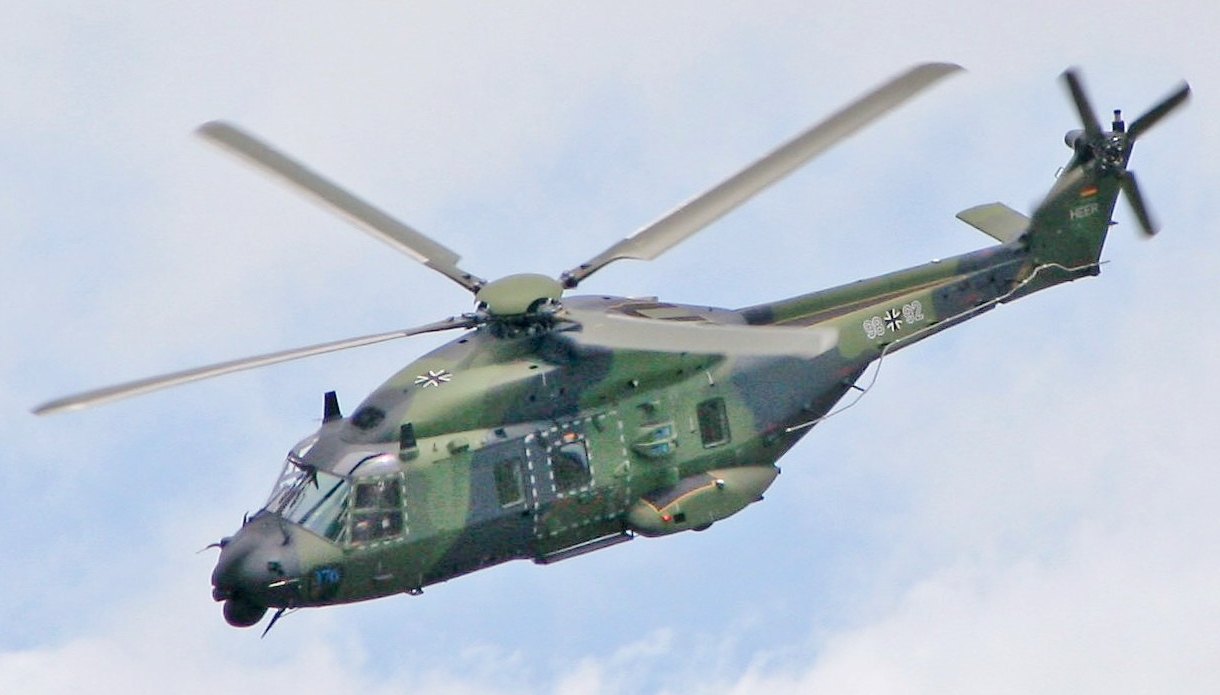
In the future, the NATO-Helikopter 90 (NH-90) is to take over the tasks of the Bell UH-1D being more cost-effective and less noisy

Celle Air Base is an important economic factor in the structurally weak Celle region. The air base spends approximately 3.5 Million Euro annually on building and maintenance works and an additional 3 Million Euro per year on facility management (2006). More than 2000 soldiers, civil servants and ancillary staff are employed at the base.

German armed forces' helicopter pilots will pass through the airbase at a stage of their training.

Training flights as well as missions throughout Germany are flown from Celle Air Base. Due to the role of Army Aviation Maintenance Squadron 100 helicopter units from all over Germany head for Celle Air Base.

Combined with areas controlled by the military air bases Bückeburg, Wunstorf and Faßberg (southwest to northeast) the airspace surrounding Celle is part of a larger area of responsibility which represents one of the largest connected military air spaces near the ground in Germany. This enables military flights inside this area to remain solely under military control.

Due to its proximity to the large military training areas Bergen and Munster Celle Air Base occasionally participates national and international manoeuvres when military aircraft are involved.

In contrast to other air bases like Ramstein Air Base, Celle Air Base is relatively unknown within Germany. Apart from local newspapers and internal media of the German Army it is rarely mentioned in the press. Civil aviation does not take place at Celle Air Base.

Due to an increase in costs and in order to decrease the noise pollution for the population flight simulators are increasingly used. Only the essential elements of flight training are practised by using actual helicopters. By 2012 the German armed forces had intend to have implemented the new Tiger and NH-90 helicopters. Consequently, training on the Bell UH-1D was to be reduced and terminated in September 2010. The remaining Bell UH-1D helicopters were handed over to Faßberg Air Base where they will be flown until the delivery of the new NH-90 helicopter. The practicing of autorotation was to be continued at Celle as this could not be trained on the standard helicopter for initial flight training, the Eurocopter EC-135 stationed at the main base of Army Aviation School at Bückeburg. However, with the forthcoming discontinuation of flying activities at Celle Air Base, the practice of autorotation will be trained elsewhere.

Army Aviation Maintenance Squadron 100 was to remain responsible for the entire fleet of Bölkow Bo-105 of the German armed forces. Apart from missions flown by Army Aviation Liaison and Reconnaissance Squadron 100, training flights of the Army Aviation School were also supposed to continue at Celle since, in view of cost-effectiveness and noise pollution, it was thought that this task could not be managed by a single airfield alone. Nevertheless, due to the reorganisation/reduction of the German Armed Forces both Army Aviation Maintenance Squadron 100 and Army Aviation Liaison and Reconnaissance Squadron 100 were disbanded.

In October 2011 the German Federal Ministry of Defence announced a reorganisation/reduction of the German Armed Forces. As a consequence, some units stationed at Celle Air Base ceased to exist. These units were either disbanded or relocated to and integrated into the International Helicopter Training Centre at Bückeburg. The facilities at Celle are also to be used to house a regional medical treatment facility, a non-commissioned officer candidate battalion, an air manoeuvre training centre and a fire brigade unit. The number of military personnel at the air base will be reduced from 1080 to 400.

== Criticism ==
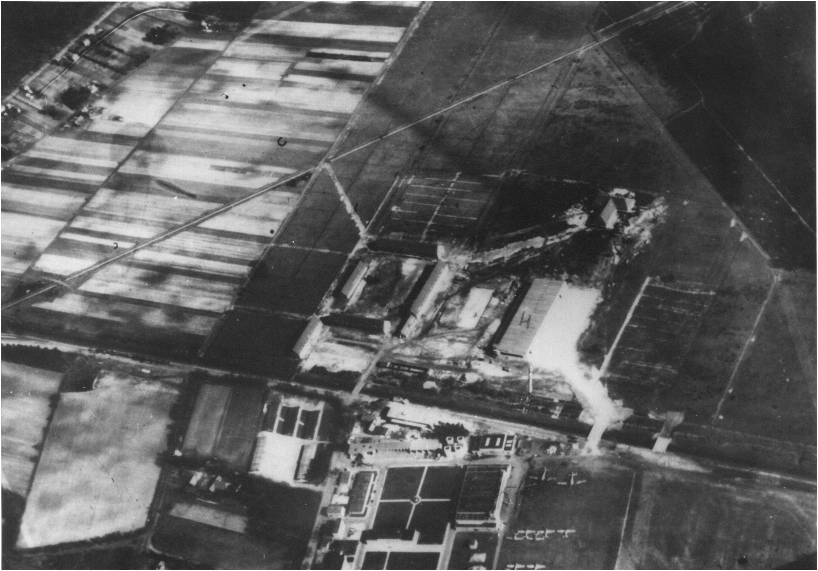
View from Celle Air Base eastwards towards the arable land in the year 1936. Nowadays the aircraft noise affected town districts of Heese und Westercelle are situated there

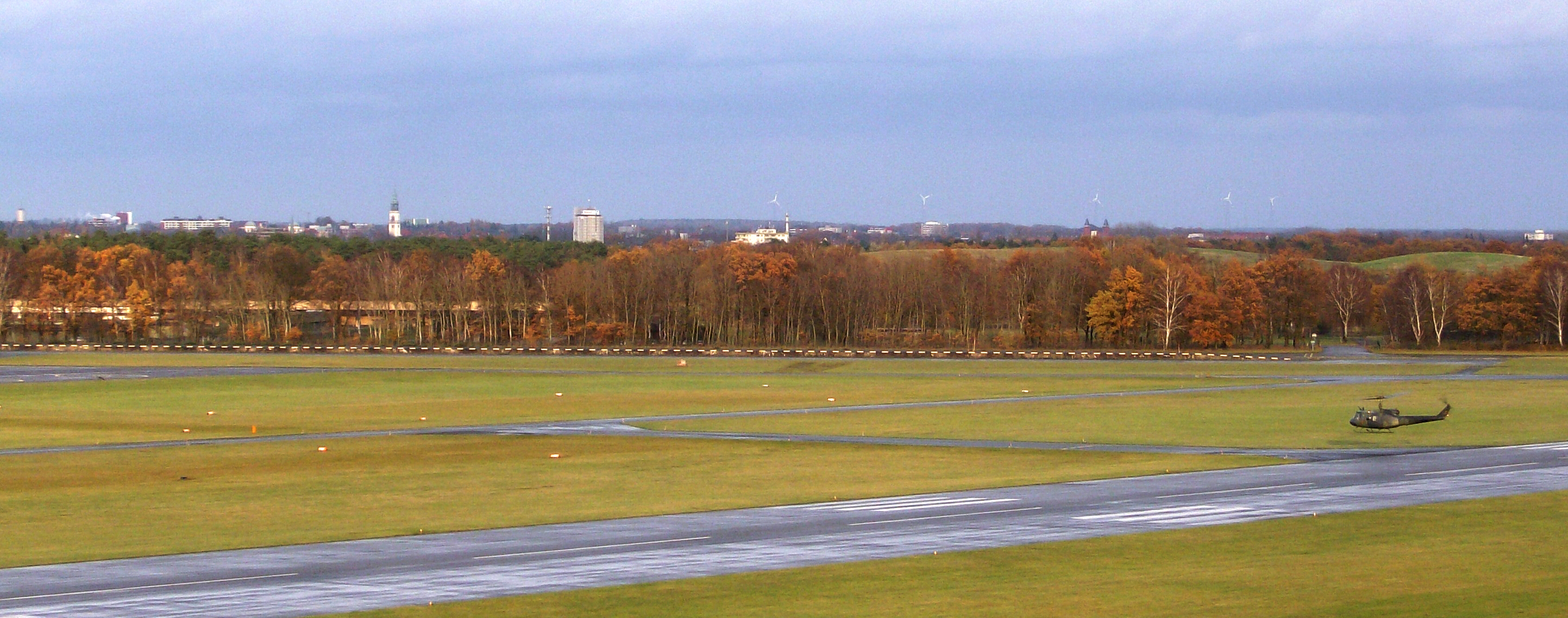
A Bell UH-1D vacating the runway of Celle Air Base, in the background the city of Celle. Helicopters of this type with their characteristic rotor sound lead to many complaints regarding aircraft noise

In the course of time the city of Celle has expanded towards the actual air base, a development which occurred at other military airfields too. Since the inception of the air base the attitude of the public towards the military and its training facilities has changed significantly. The first complaints about aircraft noise were published in the local newspapers shortly after the German Army Aviation Corps took control of the air base. The complaints reached a climax in 1965 when plans were made public to have a second runway, leading from the northeast to the southwest, built at Celle Air Base and to have a wing of strike fighters stationed at the airfield. Residents, mostly from Wietzenbruch, founded a voluntary association and petitioned the federal parliament. The plans were abandoned and after the Federal Ministry had given assurances that only helicopters would be stationed at Celle Air Base the association dissolved. The noise produced by the helicopters, however, remained a subject of contention in local newspapers.

Since the 1990s areas directly to the north of the air base have been demarcated for land development, namely Westercelle, and Altencelle. These areas are situated directly beneath the approach path of runway 26. Even though developers and prospective buyers were previously informed regarding the proximity of the airfield and also benefited from reduced house prices, some did not realise the actual effects of living close to an active airfield, particularly during periods of night flight training, which has led to numerous complaints.

Following German reunification Army Aviation Regiment 16 equipped with helicopters of the type Bölkow Bo-105 remained the only flying unit at Celle. The disbandment of this regiment in 2002 and the subsequent establishment of the helicopter training school from 2003 onwards resulted in a significant increase in air traffic and brought the issue of noise pollution back on the agenda. When helicopters of the type Bell UH-1D were relocated to Celle Air Base in the spring of 2005 it caused additional protest by the population living in the vicinity of the airfield. The sound made by the rotor blades (colloquially called "carpet beater") is perceived as particularly noisy in comparison with the Bölkow Bo-105. Many residents who had bought houses or had them built during the relatively silent years were surprised by this new intensity of aircraft noise.

As a reaction to this criticism units based at Celle voluntarily restrict themselves to circle the aerodrome only over the mostly uninhabited area to the south of the air base and to avoid training approaches over Westercelle as much as possible. Flight movements at lunch time are kept to a minimum. Approach as well as departure over densely populated areas is prohibited. These restrictions relieve the built-up areas surrounding the air base of noise pollution to a certain degree. They have, however, the effect that flight movements are now channelled along the remaining routes permitted leading to an increase of noise and of annoyance to the population affected. Since many retired soldiers and staff formerly working at the base still live in and around Celle there are not only critics of the air base but also supporters who voice their opinion in various forums and letters to the editor stressing the economic factor of the air base and the fact that the air base had existed since 1934 so that the opponents were in full knowledge of its existence when they bought property at reduced prices in its vicinity.

== Reference in Literature ==
Celle Air Base is mentioned in Frederick Forsyth's 1975 novella The Shepherd, as the point of departure of the pilot flying home to England from Germany at Christmas 1957.

== See also ==
- List of former units and aircraft of Celle Air Base
- Army Aviation
