= Faßberg Air Base =

Military airbase in Germany

Faßberg Air Base Heeresflugplatz Faßberg (Advanced Landing Ground B-152)
- Faßberg, Lower Saxony in Germany
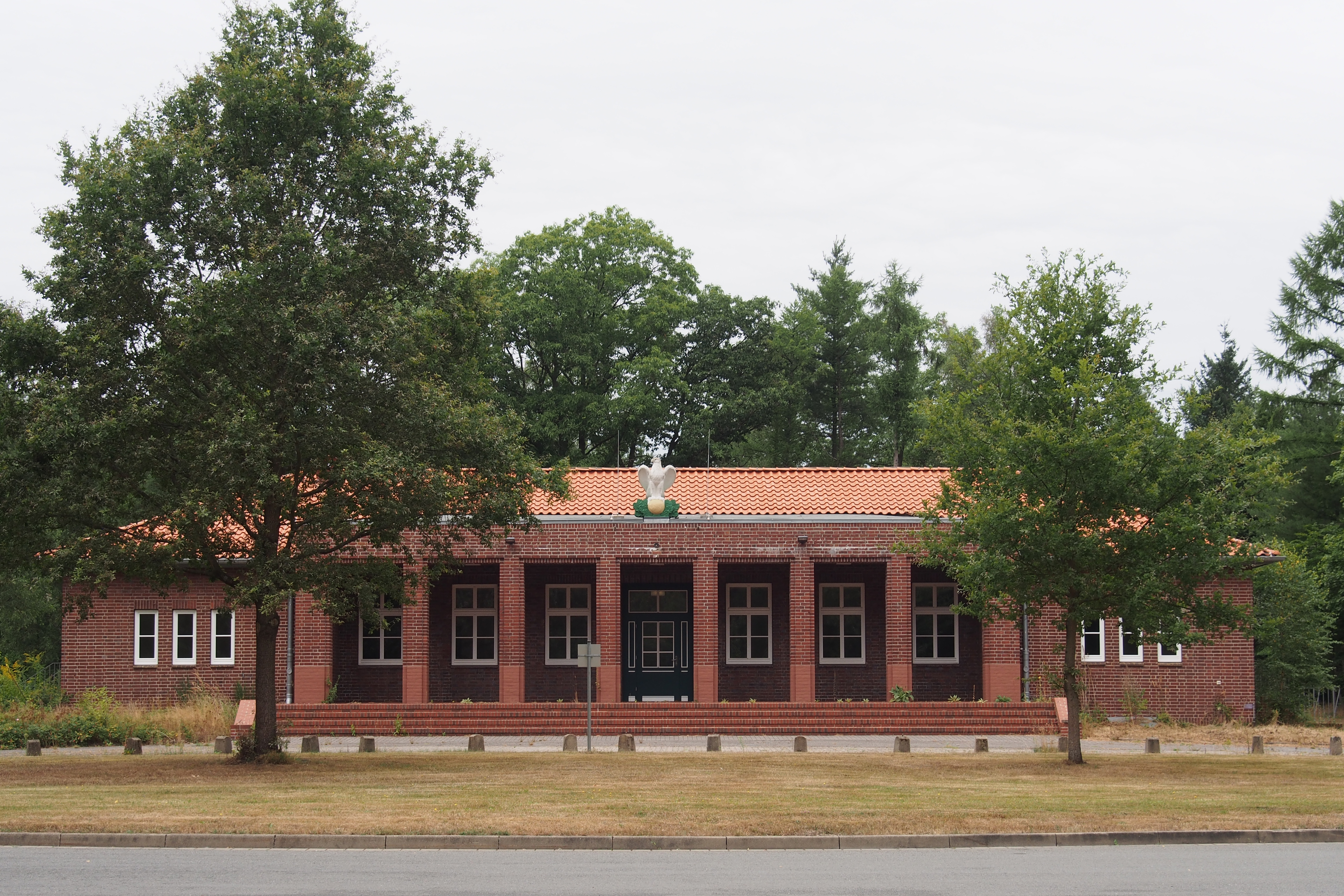
- Former main entrance to Faßberg Air Base

Site information
- Owner: Federal Ministry of Defence
- Operator: Bundeswehr

Location
- Shown within Lower Saxony
- Coordinates: 52°55′10″N 010°11′20″E

Site history
- Built: 1934
- In use: 1934-present

Airfield information
- Identifiers: ICAO: ETHS
- Elevation: 75 metres (246 ft) AMSL
Runways
Direction	Length and surface
09/27	2,440 metres (8,005 ft) Asphalt
09L/27R	1,000 metres (3,281 ft) Grass
06/24	400 metres (1,312 ft) Grass

Faßberg Air Base (German: Heeresflugplatz Faßberg) (ICAO: ETHS) is a Bundeswehr base located 2 kilometres (1.2 mi) northeast of the municipality of Faßberg, Lower Saxony, Germany. The air base is jointly used by the German Army (Heer) and the German Air Force (Luftwaffe). Its main user is the German Army Aviation Corps.

== History ==
An airfield was established in 1934. However, since Germany was not allowed to possess an air force under the rules of the Treaty of Versailles, the airfield was supposed to serve a future air force.

Between 1934 and 1945 various Luftwaffe units were based on the air base, flying aircraft as diverse as Junkers Ju 52, Junkers Ju 88, Heinkel He 111, and towards the final stages of World War II Messerschmitt Me 163 and Messerschmitt Me 262.

In April 1945 the airfield was overrun by the British Army and subsequently used by the Royal Air Force (RAF). It was renamed first Airfield B 152 and later RAF Fassberg. During the Berlin Blockade RAF Fassberg played an important role as a hub for supplying the city.

Whilst being operated by the British Armed Forces several RAF squadrons were based at Fassberg. The first of these was 26 Squadron who arrived on 13 April 1946 and stayed for varying periods during the next 16 months. The squadron initially used the Hawker Tempest F.5 until June 1946 when it switched to the Tempest F.2. The squadron stayed until 11 August 1947 then moved to RAF Gutersloh.

The next squadron was 14 Squadron which arrived on 1 November 1950 with the de Havilland Mosquito B.35, however only two months later during February 1951 they changed to the de Havilland Vampire FB.5 and further between May 1953 and July 1954 the Venom FB.1 was introduced with the squadron utilising both Vampires and Venom. On 23 June 1955 the squadron moved to RAF Oldenburg.

On 1 November 1950 98 Squadron joined with the Vampire FB.5 and changed to the Venom FB.1 during August 1953, the squadron moved to Jever on 19 April 1955.

The next squadron to arrive was 118 who reformed here on 10 May 1951 with the de Havilland Vampire FB.5. Shortly afterwards on 12 May 1951 112 Squadron also reformed here operating the Vampire FB.5 however it was only a short stay and the squadron moved to RAF Jever on 7 March 1952.

The de Havilland Venom FB.1 arrived to 118 Squadron during September 1953 and the squadron operated both the Vampire FB.5 and Venom FB.1 until June 1954 when the last Vampire's had left. The unit moved to Jever on 6 May 1955.

On 26 September 1955 11 Squadron arrived with the Venom FB.4 but they only stayed until the following October and moved to RAF Wunstorf. Similarly 5 Squadron joined on 10 October 1955 also with the Venom FB.4 and moved to Wunstorf on 9 October 1956.

During 15 October 1955 266 Squadron arrived with the Venom FB.4 and moved to Wunstorf exactly a year later.

The following units were also here at some point:

- No. 23 Light Anti-Aircraft Battery.
- No. 3 Armoured Car Squadron RAF Regiment.
- No. 22 (LAA) Squadron RAF Regiment also at the handing over of the station to the Luftwaffe.

Following the foundation of the Bundeswehr in 1955 and consequently the establishing of a German air force, Faßberg Air Base was returned to Germany on 1 January 1957. It was home of the Technical School of the Luftwaffe and for some time the Luftwaffe's Officer Training School. For fifteen years a helicopter pilot training school was also located at Faßberg Air base; this school has since been disbanded.

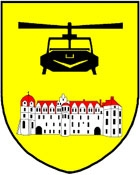
Coat of arms of Transport Helicopter Regiment 10

== Current use ==
Faßberg Air Base is home to the army's Transport Helicopter Regiment 10 (Transporthubschrauberregiment 10) which was established in 1971. The regiment was first based at Celle Air Base but was moved to Faßberg in 1981. Transport Helicopter Regiment 10 is equipped with helicopters of the type Bell UH-1D. Other units stationed at the air base are the airforce's training school, a technical-logistical training centre for rotary wing aircraft run by both the air force and the army, part of the Franco-German training facilities for the Eurocopter Tiger, a medical services centre, a family support unit and part of the administration of Bergen-Hohne Training Area.

== See also ==
- German Army Aviation Corps
- History of the German Army Aviation Corps
- German Army
- List of airports in Germany
- List of former Royal Air Force stations
- 60th Air Mobility Wing
