= De Havilland Venom =

Fighter aircraft family

DH 112 Venom
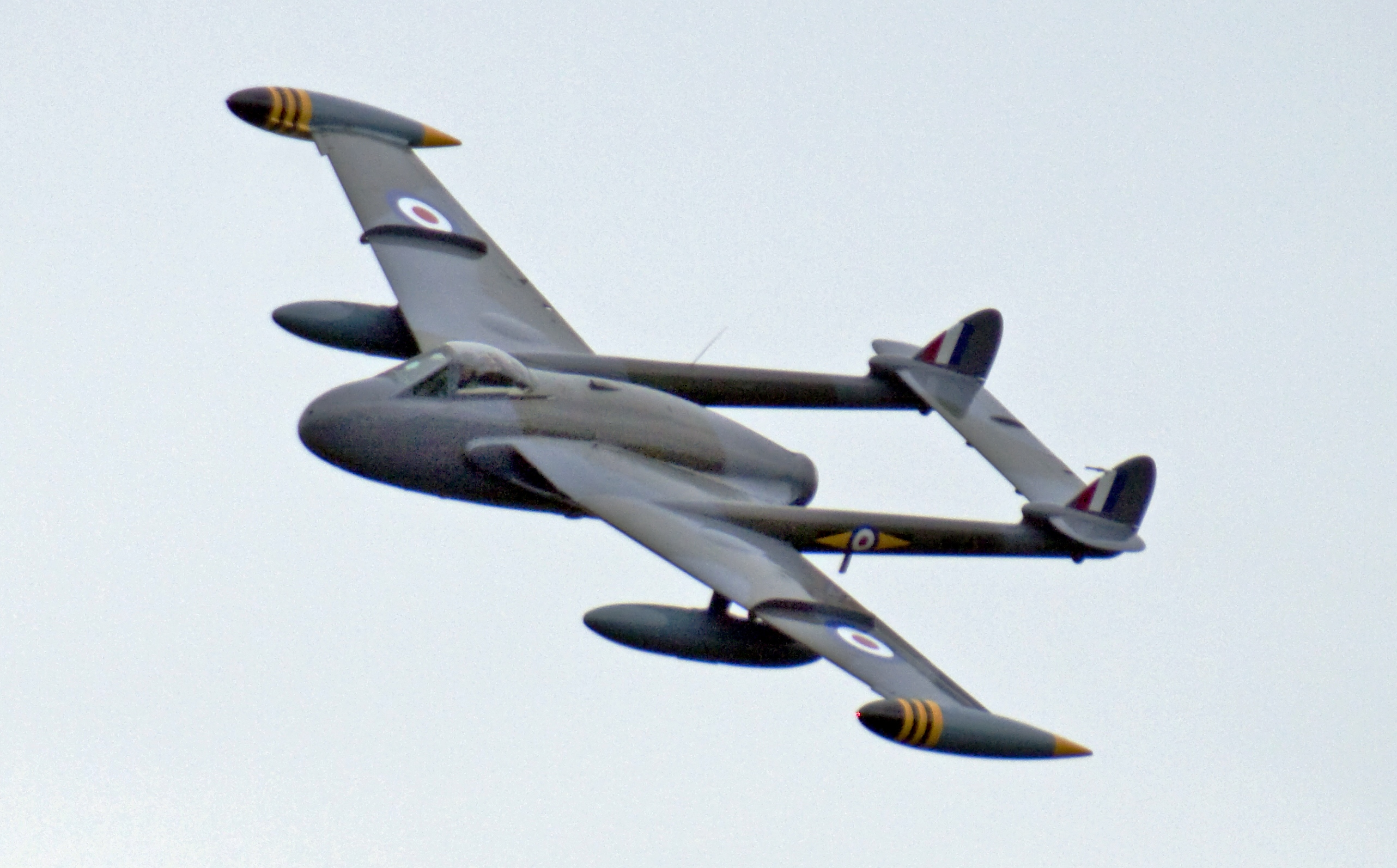
- Privately owned Venom FB.50 in flight.

General information
- Type: Fighter-bomber
- National origin: United Kingdom
- Manufacturer: de Havilland Aircraft Company
- Primary users: Royal Air Force Swedish Air Force; Swiss Air Force; Venezuelan Air Force
- Number built: 1,431 (including Sea Venom/Aquilon)

History
- Introduction date: 1952
- First flight: 2 September 1949
- Retired: 1983
- Developed from: de Havilland Vampire
- Variant: de Havilland Sea Venom/Aquilon

The de Havilland DH 112 Venom is a British post-war single-engined jet aircraft developed and manufactured by the de Havilland Aircraft Company. Much of its design was derived from the de Havilland Vampire, the firm's first jet-powered combat aircraft; it was initially referred to as the Vampire FB 8 prior to the adoption of the Venom name.

The Venom was developed during the late 1940s to fulfil Air Ministry Specification F.15/49, under which the aircraft was intended to be operated as an interim solution, lying between the first generation of British jet fighters – straight-wing aircraft powered by centrifugal flow engines such as the Gloster Meteor and the Vampire – and later swept wing, axial flow-engined combat aircraft, such as the Hawker Hunter and de Havilland Sea Vixen. In comparison with the Vampire, it had a thinner wing and a more powerful de Havilland Ghost 103 turbojet engine, making the aircraft more suitable for high altitude flight. Both the Royal Air Force (RAF) and the Royal Navy took interest in the type; in order to suit the needs of the latter, a specialised derivative, the Sea Venom, was produced; it was a navalised model of the aircraft that was suitable for carrier operations. A dedicated model for aerial reconnaissance was also procured by the Swiss Air Force. On 2 September 1949, the first Venom prototype, VV612, performed its maiden flight.

The Venom entered service with the RAF in 1952, where it was operated as both a single-seat fighter-bomber and two-seat night fighter. Despite the type's relatively short service life with the RAF, British Venoms flew on operations on several occasions, including the Suez Crisis, the Malayan Emergency, and the Aden Emergency. It was withdrawn from front line operations by the service in 1962 following the introduction of more capable aircraft. The Venom had also proved to be popular on the export market, having been sold in substantial numbers to Iraq, New Zealand, Sweden, Switzerland and Venezuela. The Swiss Air Force was the final operator to use the type in an active military role, finally retiring their last examples during 1983. Large numbers of ex-military Venoms have since been acquired by private entities and several have continued to fly, performing displays at various air shows, while many examples have been preserved in static display conditions in museums and as gate guardians.

== Development ==
=== Origins ===
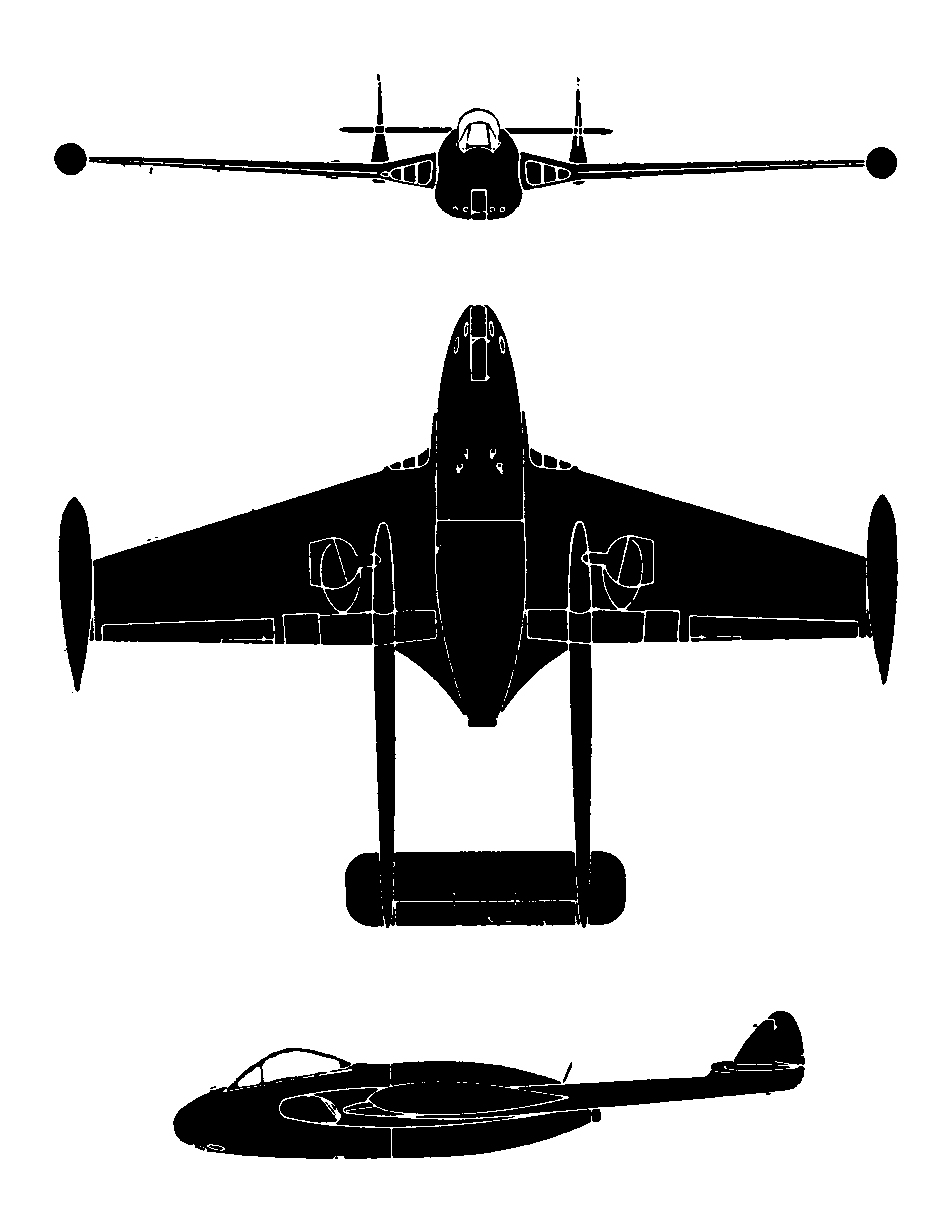
de Havilland Venom FB 1

During 1948, the British aircraft manufacturer de Havilland proposed a development of the Vampire, furnished with a thinner wing and a more powerful engine, to serve as a high altitude fighter, designated as the 'Vampire FB 8' ("fighter bomber Mark 8"). The design gradually shifted, with company designation DH 112, in order to fulfill Air Ministry requirement OR.277, defined in Specification F.15/49, which sought a fast, manoeuvrable and capable fighter-bomber to replace the Royal Air Force's (RAF) existing Vampires in that capacity. From the onset, the envisioned role had been intended as an interim fighter-bomber, while the development of aircraft capable of even greater performance had already been anticipated by the service.

Although generally similar in appearance to the preceding Vampire, sharing the distinctive twin-boom tail and composite wood/metal structure, the Venom was a completely new design. As originally designed, it was powered by the de Havilland Ghost 103 turbojet engine, which was capable of generating 4,850lb of thrust, considerably more powerful than the earlier de Havilland Goblin that had been used on the Vampire. The Venom adopted a wing designed with a leading edge sweepback of 17.6 degrees, a minimised thickness/chord ratio reduced from 14 per cent to 10 per cent, while the trailing edge was straight; a pair of optionally-fitted wing tip tanks were also designed to be fitted without any negative impact on the aircraft's overall combat manoeuvring capability.

A single Vampire F 1 had flown with the new Ghost engine in 1947. On 2 September 1949, the first Venom prototype, VV612, performed its maiden flight at Hatfield, Hertfordshire, piloted by John Derry. In May 1950, following the end of company trials, the prototype was delivered to RAF Boscombe Down for official trials by the Aeroplane and Armament Experimental Establishment (A&AEE). In the course of these trials, the aircraft proved capable of satisfactory performance, including the besting of some contemporary fighters during mock combat, while some minor faults were also uncovered. On 23 May 1950, the second prototype, VV613, officially joined the development programme; it was delivered to the A&AEE for further trials on 3 April 1951.

The first six production Venom also participated in trials performed by both de Havilland and the A&AEE. On 21 April 1952, the first delivery of a production-standard Venom, a single-seat fighter-bomber, was made to the Central Fighter Establishment, where it was used for a full service evaluation prior to the type being cleared for active service. During 1952, the initial production model entered operational service with the RAF as the 'Venom FB 1'. A total of 375 of this initial model were constructed.

=== Further development ===
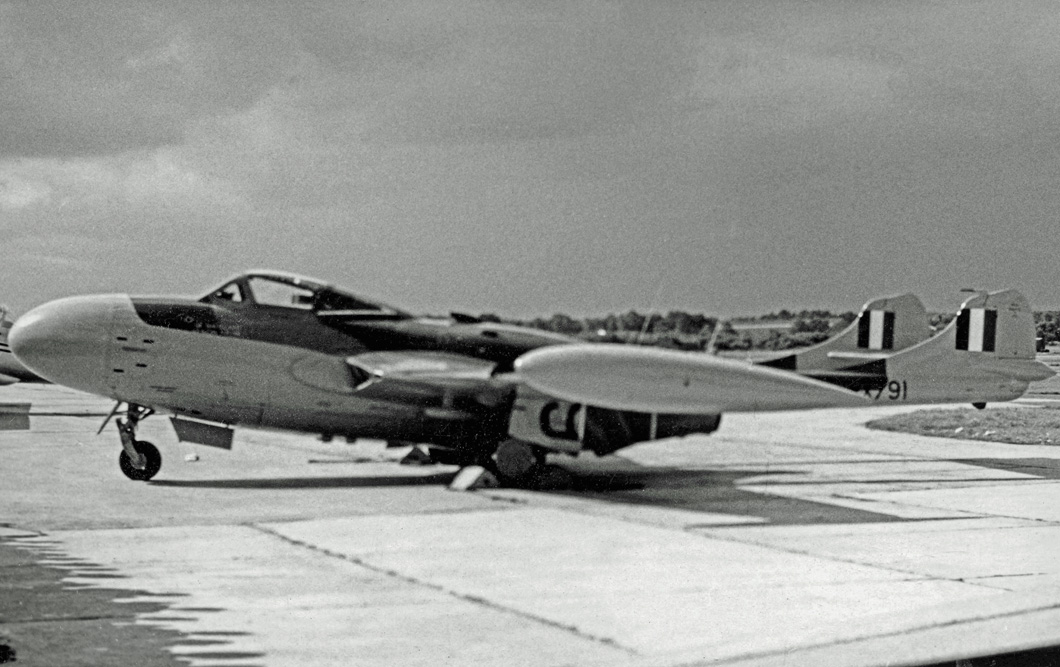
A Venom NF.3. Note the clear view canopy and revised tail surfaces of this mark.

On 22 August 1950, an improved Venom, the NF.2 night fighter, performed its first flight, piloted by John Derry. de Havilland had developed it from the single seat ground attack-oriented Venom to serve as a replacement for the Vampire NF 10. For this variant, the fuselage was redesigned to accommodate a two-man crew, (pilot and navigator/radar operator), seated in a side-by-side configuration, and an aircraft interception radar installed in the extended nose. During late 1953, the Venom NF.2 entered squadron service, after being delayed to resolve minor problems that had been discovered. Specifically, preliminary handling trials had revealed unsatisfactory performance in poor weather conditions.

The Venom NF.2 was modified after being involved in several accidents in which pilots had difficulty making night-time approaches. Changes included the adoption of jettisonable clear canopies and alterations to the flight control surfaces, and the altered aircraft were re-designated NF.2As. The Venom NF.2 was soon followed by the NF 3, which was the ultimate night fighter variant of the Venom. It incorporated further improvements, including power-actuated ailerons and an improved air interception radar. In 1953, the Venom NF 3 performed its first flight; it entered operational service with the RAF during June 1955.

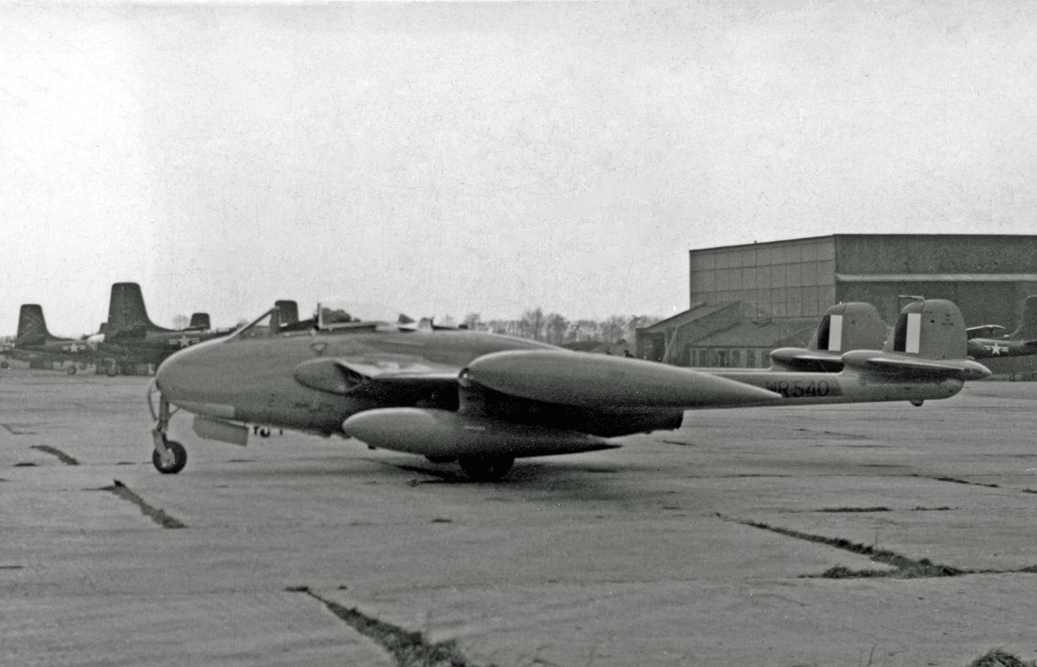
A Venom FB.4, note the revised tail surfaces. This aircraft served Nos. 28 and 60 Squadrons of the RAF.

The final Venom model developed for the RAF was the single-seat FB.4, which first flew on 29 December 1953. It entered service in 1955 and 250 were built. The FB.4 was powered by a single 4,850 lbf (21.6 kN) thrust de Havilland Ghost 103 engine. It was the first Venom to be fitted with an ejector seat, as well as being furnished with redesigned tail surfaces and hydraulically powered ailerons. The new rudder design prevented excessive yaw and eliminated incidents of rudder locking at low speeds. The FB 4 variant was the first to be compatible with the underwing fuel tanks.

The majority of the type's production was conducted by de Havilland themselves. Following the completion of an initial batch of 15 production Venoms, manufacturing was transferred from de Havilland's Hatfield facility to their larger production plant at Hawarden Airport. On 26 July 1952, the first Hawarden-built Venom was delivered to the RAF. In addition, the construction effort was augmented by numbers of Venom FB.1, FB.4 and NF.51 aircraft that were produced by Fairey Aviation at Manchester (Ringway) Airport. At one point, the production of further Venoms at the Bristol Aeroplane Company's Filton facility was considered but was ultimately not pursued. During the early 1950s, the prospects for Italian aircraft manufacturer Fiat Aviazione producing the type under license were explored; these did not materialise however.

On account of substantial demand for the type from the Swiss Air Force, a licensed production arrangement was established with a consortium of Swiss aviation manufacturers in 1953, who did produce large numbers of Venoms. In the early 1970s, Swiss Venoms were equipped with a new extended nose to add space for the addition of a ultra high frequency (UHF) radio, an Identification friend or foe (IFF) transponder and a SAAB BT-9K ballistic computer that was used in conjunction with ground attack ordnance.

== Design ==
The de Havilland Venom was a jet-propelled combat aircraft, featuring a distinctive twin-boom tail and composite wood/metal structure. Originally developed as a ground-attack fighter, it served as an interceptor as well. It possessed a favourable rate of climb and other positive characteristics that lent itself well to combat operations, and represented a significant advance over the preceding Vampire. It was a sound ground attack aircraft, possessing good manoeuvrability, steadiness, endurance, handling, and a range of compatible stores. The Venom's manoeuvrability even gave it an edge against many dogfighters of the era, although its limited top speed proved to be a weakness in this role. Early issues, such as a rear spar weakness and flash fires due to the ingestion of vented fuel by the engine air intakes under some conditions, were quickly identified and overcome.

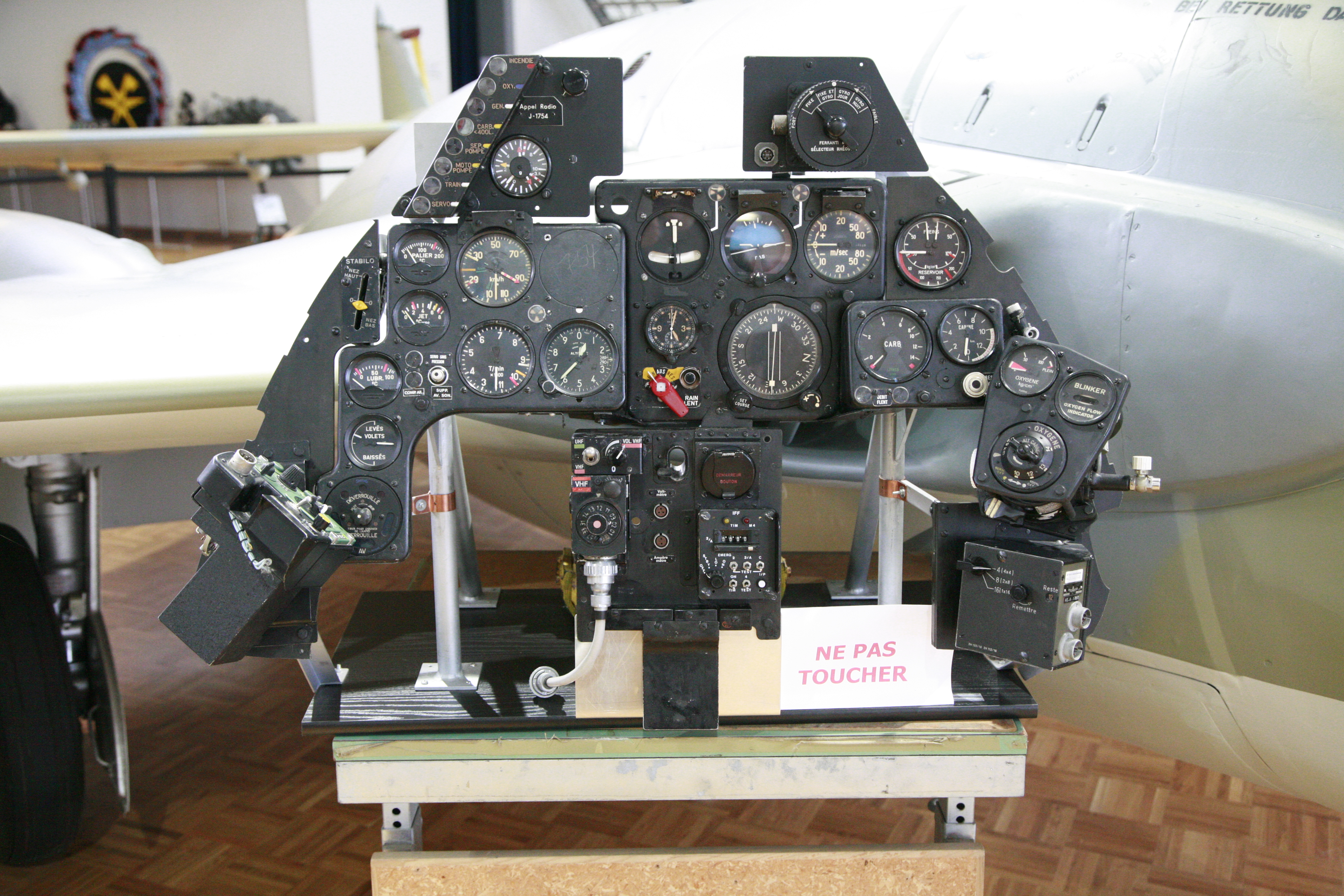
Instrument panel of a Swiss Venom

The Venom FB 1 was armed with four nose-mounted 20 mm (.79 in) Hispano Mk V autocannon and could carry either two 1,000 lb (approx 450 kg) bombs (Note: 1,000 lb was the nominal weight of these Medium Capacity bombs) or eight RP-3 "60 lb" air-to-ground rocket projectiles – the heavier bombs being an improvement over the Vampire FB 5. For additional range, each of the wing tips could be fitted with a 75 imp gal (340 L) fuel tank, freeing up the underwing stores positions for other stores and munitions, these tanks could not be jettisoned during flight. When installed, the tip tanks also had the effect of improving the aircraft's roll rate, which was lower than many of its contemporaries. Early production Venoms commonly suffered from weaknesses within the wing structure, leading to flight limitations and warning markings being applied to distinguish them from typical aircraft.

The Venom FB 1 was powered by a single 4,850 lbf (21.6 kN) thrust de Havilland Ghost 48 Mk.1 turbojet engine; later marks were equipped with increasingly powerful models. The engine was ignited using explosive cartridges, known as Coffman engine starters; at the time, many operators were not previously familiar with such means of start up. Early production models lacked ejection seats, which was subject to official criticism and in response, they were fitted in later production models. The airframe itself had a relatively short life in UK service as it had been designed as a short term interim aircraft pending development of what would become the Hawker Hunter but in Swiss service, where the type was subject to a lengthy service life, several strengthening modifications were performed to more than double its viable lifespan. It was known for its simplicity in construction and relative cost-effectiveness, which contributed to its popularity to export customers.

== Operational history ==
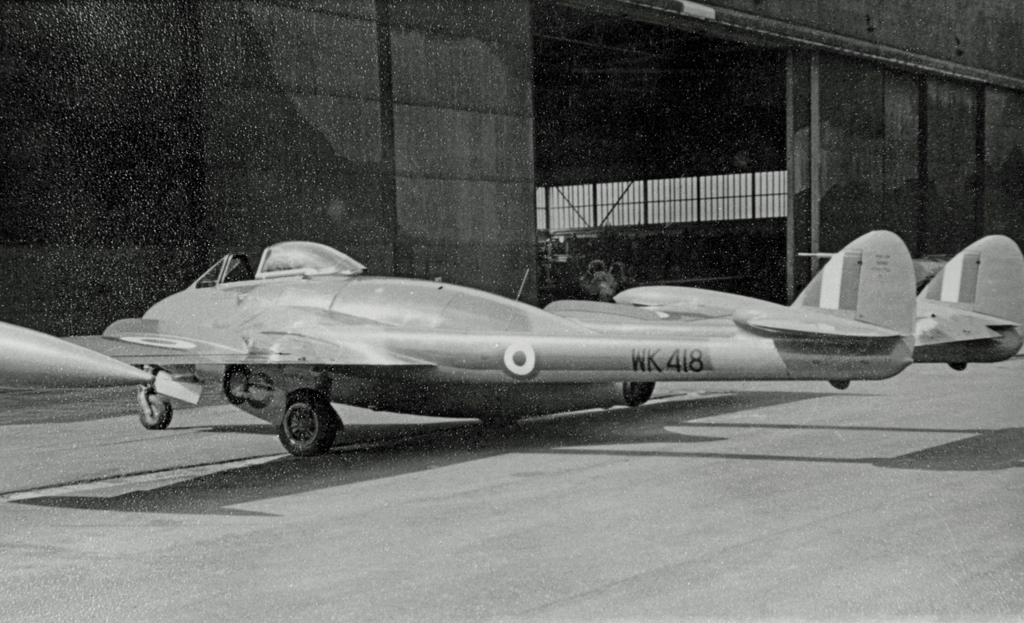
Venom FB.1 built by Fairey Aviation in 1954

In August 1952, No. 11 Squadron become the first overseas squadron to convert to the Venom in exchange for their existing Vampires inventory; No. 11 was responsible for conducting the type's operational service trials for the service. Upon their introduction to service, none of the single-seat fighter-bomber Venoms were deployed to home-based squadrons; priority was given to overseas forces, such as the Second Tactical Air Force stationed in Germany as well as those stationed in hotter climates where the benefits of the more powerful engine were most felt, such as Cyprus, the Middle East, Africa, and Asia.

During September 1952, the Venom participated in its first NATO training operation, Exercise Mainbrace. In mid-1953, a second Venom wing, consisting of Nos. 14, 98 and 118 Squadrons, was formed at RAF Fassberg, Lower Saxony; a third wing, comprising Nos. 16, 94, and 145 Squadrons, was also formed at RAF Celle, Lower Saxony, during the following year. In this capacity, the Venom was only operated for a short time, those squadrons stationed at RAF Fassberg converted to the Hunter in 1955, while those at RAF Celle were disbanded in 1957.

Throughout the mid-1950s, Venoms were dispatched to the furthest corners of the Commonwealth, being typically used to replace the Vampire in the fighter-bomber role. In August 1955, a flight of four Venoms conducted a 10,000 flight from RAF Habbaniya, Iraq to Wingfield Aerodrome, South Africa and back; while on the return leg of this journey, a speed record was set on the Cape Town-Pretoria route, covering the 807-mile distance in one hour and 23 minutes.

On 6 May 1953, the first of the Venom night fighters was delivered to the RAF. From 1955 onwards, an improved model of the night fighter, the Venom NF.3, was introduced to squadron service. However, the night fighter Venom had only a relatively brief career with the RAF, having been procured to serve as an interim solution while more capable designs were developed. Accordingly, in 1957, the RAF's night fighter Venoms began to be withdrawn in favour of the newly introduced Gloster Javelin twin-engined all-weather fighter. In the night fighter role, the Venom was also adopted by export customers; the Swedish Air Force adopted the type as their principal night fighter in 1955 and operated three squadrons in this capacity.

RAF Venoms saw action during the Malayan Emergency, which took place between 1948 and 1960, although these aircraft did not commence operations until the mid-1950s with Nos. 45 and 60 Squadrons. While there, the Venom supported counterinsurgency operations against Communist guerrillas as part of Operation Firedog, the codename for RAF operations in Malaya. By 15 November 1957, the day on which the Venom was withdrawn from combat in the theatre, the type had conducted more than 300 strikes against guerrillas. Several Venoms were lent to the Royal New Zealand Air Force (RNZAF) for use during the same conflict, being operated by No. 14 Squadron RNZAF.

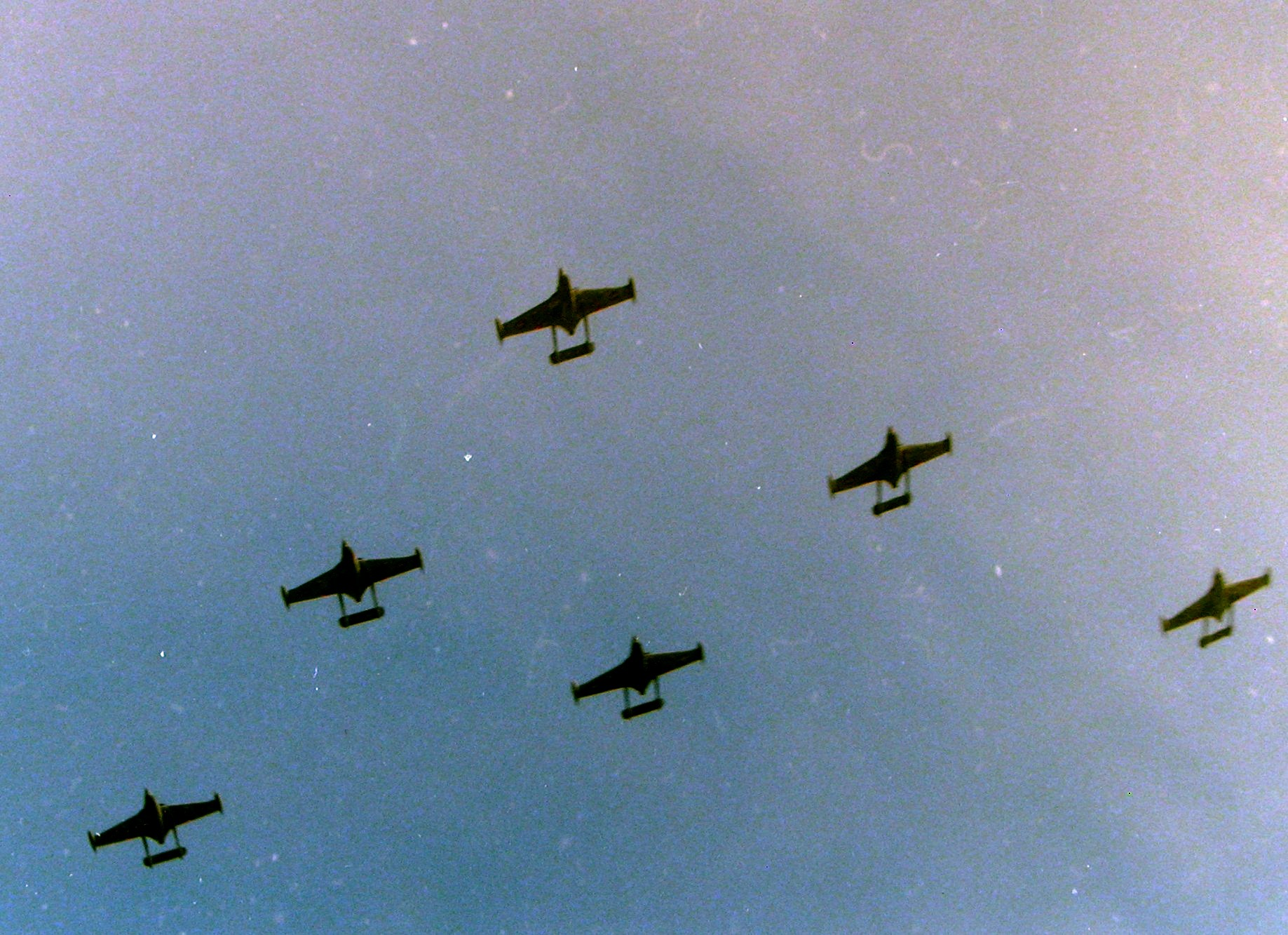
Venoms of the Swiss Air Force in formation over Interlaken, Bern, 1983

The Venom also saw combat service during the Suez Crisis during late 1956. The type was operated by Nos. 6, 8 and 249 Squadrons, flying from RAF Akrotiri, Cyprus. The Anglo-French invasion, codenamed Operation Musketeer, took place in response to the nationalisation of the Suez Canal by Egypt's leader, General Nasser. The air war began on 31 October 1956. The Venoms attacked a variety of military installations on the ground; only a single RAF Venom was lost throughout the crisis.

From 1956 onwards, Middle Eastern-based RAF squadrons progressively received the improved Venom FB 4. Starting in 1956, RAF Venoms were deployed during the Aden Emergency, where they were used in support of counterinsurgency operations against terrorists and rebel tribesmen in Aden and Oman. In 1957, British RAF Venoms participated heavily during Jebel Akhdar War in Oman to expand the territory of the Sultanate, which was a de facto British colony, in order to gain access to oil wells in the interior parts of Oman. The RAF conducted 1,635 raids, dropping 1,094 tons and firing 900 rockets at the interior of Oman between July and December 1958; insurgents were the primary targets, resulting various mountain top villages, water channels, and crops being struck in a conflict that remained relatively low profile internationally. As the conflict progressed, squadrons equipped with the Venom were reequipped, mainly by the English Electric Canberra; in 1960, the final squadron in the region that used the type was reequipped with the Hunter.

Outside of the RAF, the Swiss Air Force were the most prolific user of the Venom. In addition to the domestic production of 136 ground attack-orientated models and its Ghost engine to power them, Switzerland also produced a dedicated aerial reconnaissance variant of the aircraft, which were outfitted with specially modified underwing fuel tanks that had automated cameras installed in the forward section. Swiss Venoms were also subject to multiple improvement and upgrade programmes, including life extension modifications, the addition of UHF radio sets, and an improved licence-built bombsight.

In 1962, all of the remaining Venoms in RAF service were withdrawn from first-line duties. The very last Venoms to leave active service were those aircraft in service with the Swiss Air Force, the last of which being retired from combat duties during the latter part of 1983.

== Variants ==
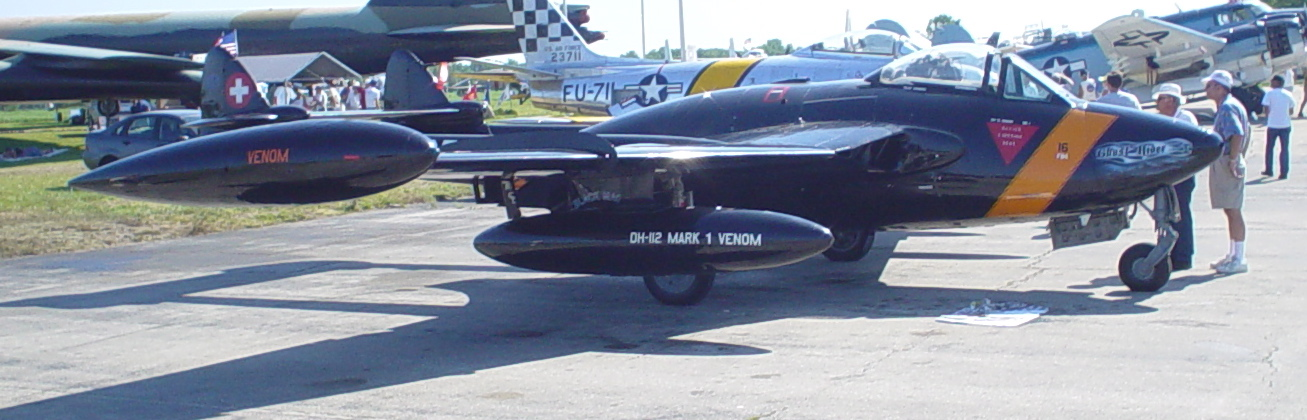
Privately owned long nosed Swiss Venom FB.54

DH.112 Prototypes

- VV612 converted from a Vampire FB.5 and first flown as a DH.112 on 2 September 1949.
- VV613 converted from a Vampire FB.5 and first flown as a DH.112 on 29 July 1950.

FB.1
Single-seat fighter-bomber, entered service in 1952; 375 built.
NF.2
Two-seat night fighter, an interim night fighter developed from a planned export for Egypt; 91 produced.
NF.2A
Modified NF.2, which received some strengthening improvements to the wing spar after problems, that had led to a number of accidents, had been found with the NF 2 and other Venoms.
NF.3
Modified NF.2, including the fitting of ejector seats, the Ghost 104 engine, AI.21 radar (Westinghouse AN/APS-57 provided under US Military Assistance Program) which led to the NF 3's nose being slightly altered; 123 produced.
FB.4
Final Venom for the RAF, single-seat fighter-bomber. Ghost 103 engine, ejector seats, powered ailerons and structural modifications; 250 built.
FB.50
Export version used by Iraq and Italy in the 1950s; 15 Built.
NF.51
Export version of the night fighter for Sweden with Swedish licence-built engines. Sixty-two - 30 NF.2 and 32 NF.2A - and given the designation J33. It served 1953–1960 at the dedicated night fighter F1 wing at Västerås.
Fiat G.80
Proposed licensed built version of the Venom FB.50 to be built in Italy.

== Operators ==
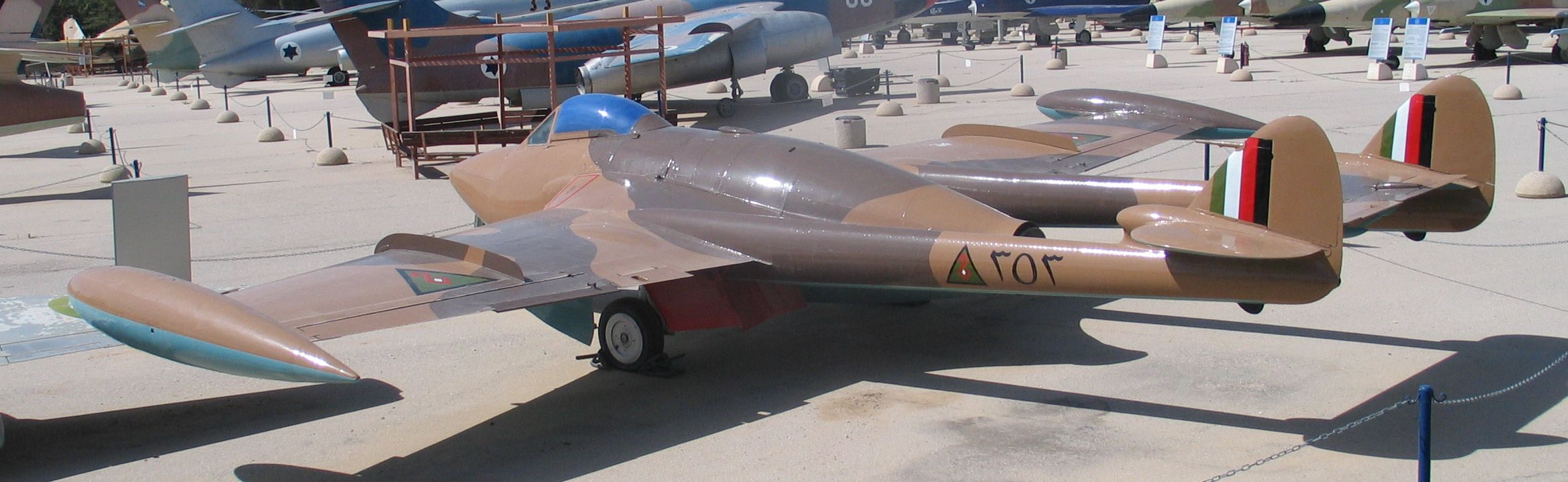
A Venom (formerly of the Swiss Air Force; now in the livery of the Iraqi Air Force) at the Israeli Air Force Museum in Hatzerim

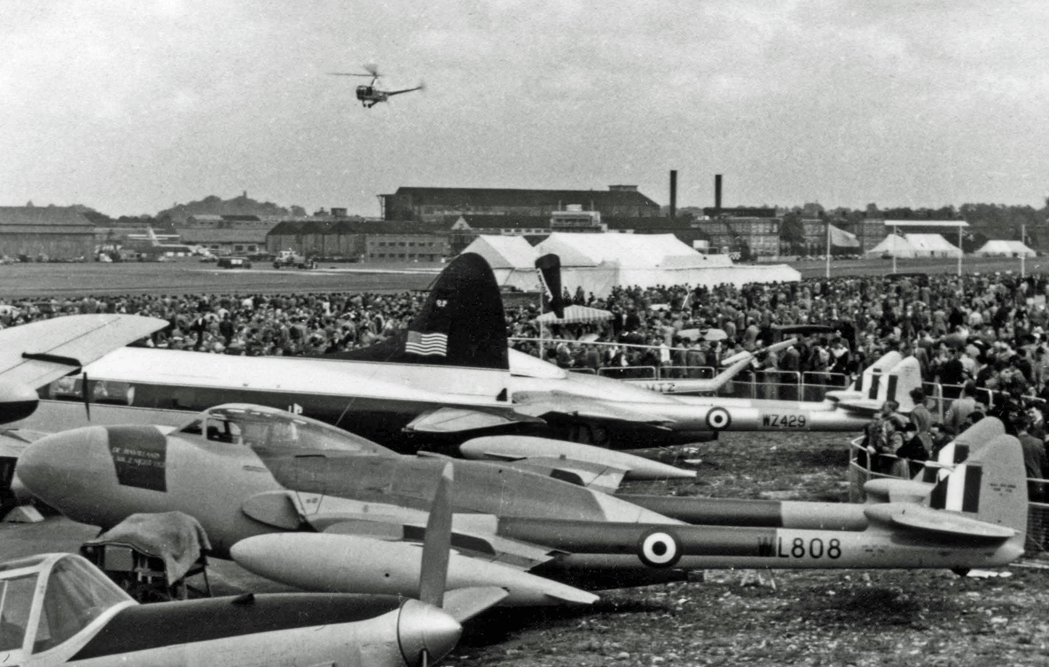
RAF Venom NF.2 night fighter at the Farnborough air show in 1952

Iraq
Iraqi Air Force
Italy
Italian Air Force (Aeronautica Militare Italiana) received two Venom FB.50s, a plan for Fiat to license-build the aircraft as the G.81 being abandoned.
New Zealand
Royal New Zealand Air Force

- No. 14 Squadron

Sweden
Swedish Air Force

- Västmanland Wing (F 1)

Switzerland
Swiss Air Force
United Kingdom
Royal Air Force

- No. 5 Squadron RAF FB.1 & FB.4 (1952–57)
- No. 6 Squadron RAF FB.1 & FB.4 (1954–57)
- No. 8 Squadron RAF FB.1 & FB.4 (1955–60)
- No. 11 Squadron RAF FB.1 & FB.4 (1952–57)
- No. 14 Squadron RAF FB.1 & FB.4 (1953–55)
- No. 16 Squadron RAF FB.1 (1954–57)
- No. 23 Squadron RAF NF.2 & NF.3 (1953–57)
- No. 28 Squadron RAF FB.1 & FB.4 (1956–62)
- No. 32 Squadron RAF FB.1 & FB.4 (1954–57)
- No. 33 Squadron RAF NF.2A (1955–57)
- No. 45 Squadron RAF FB.1 (1955–57)
- No. 60 Squadron RAF FB.1 & FB.4 (1955–59)
- No. 73 Squadron RAF FB.1 & FB.4 (1954–57)
- No. 89 Squadron RAF NF.3 (1956–57)
- No. 94 Squadron RAF FB.1 (1954–57)
- No. 98 Squadron RAF FB.1 (1953–55)
- No. 118 Squadron RAF FB.1 (1953–55)
- No. 125 Squadron RAF NF.3 (1955–57)
- No. 141 Squadron RAF NF.3 (1955–57)
- No. 142 Squadron RAF FB.4 (1959)
- No. 145 Squadron RAF FB.1 (1954–57)
- No. 151 Squadron RAF NF.3 (1955–57)
- No. 208 Squadron RAF FB.4 (1959–60)
- No. 219 Squadron RAF NF.2A (1955–57)
- No. 249 Squadron RAF FB.1 & FB.4 (1954–57)
- No. 253 Squadron RAF NF.2A (1955–57)
- No. 266 Squadron RAF FB.1 & FB.4 (1953–57)

Venezuela
Venezuelan Air Force

== Aircraft on display ==
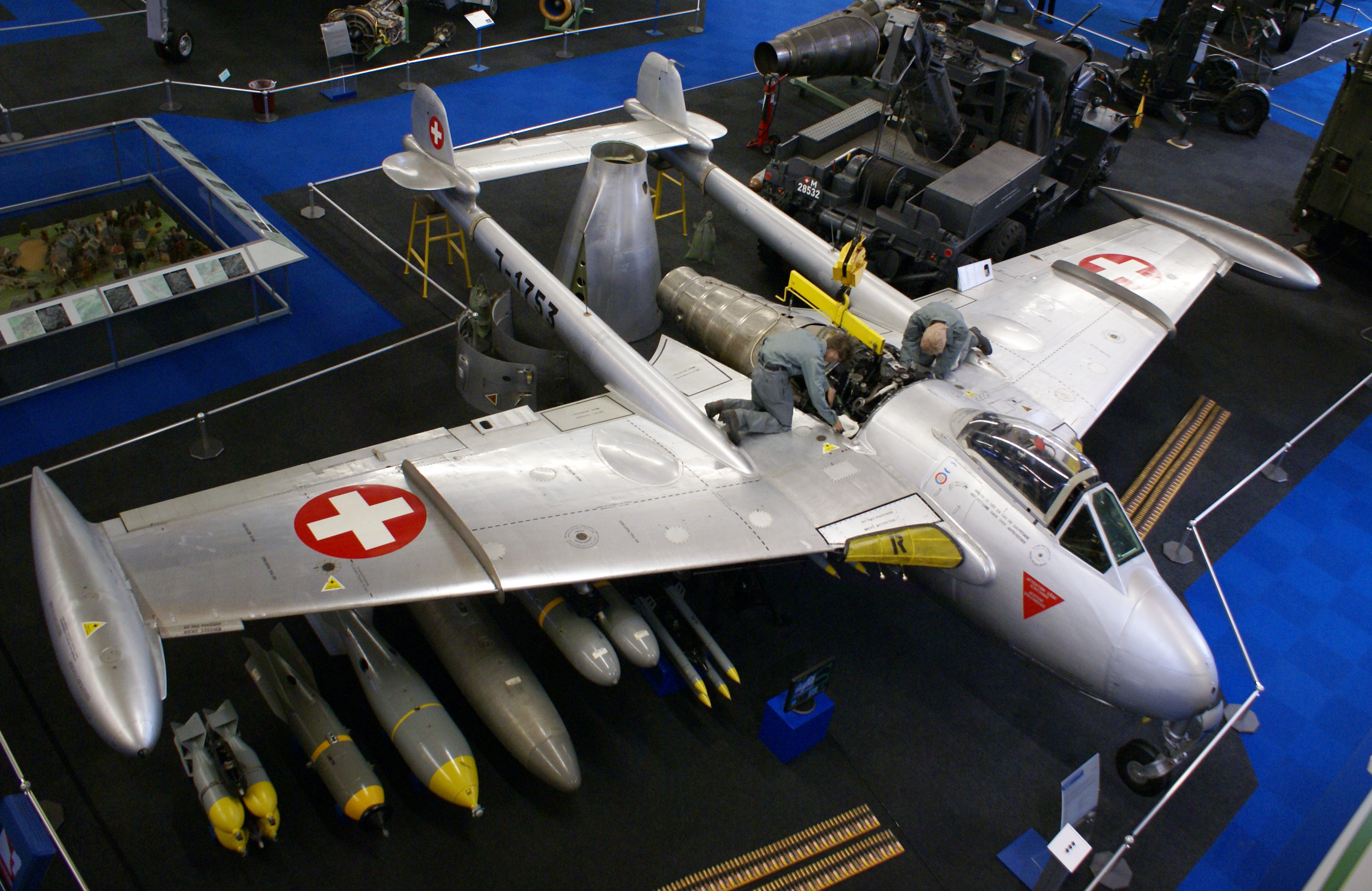
A Swiss Air Force Venom with its array of armaments at the Flieger-Flab-Museum.

The Venom has been preserved in significant numbers, mainly due to its longevity with the Swiss Air Force. In the UK, a number of Sea Venoms have been preserved, along with examples of the NF 3 and Swiss-built FB.50 and 54. In Sweden, two examples of the NF.51 are preserved. There are many survivors in Switzerland, and other Swiss aircraft are scattered throughout Europe. One such aircraft is preserved in the Israeli Air Force Museum in Hatzerim, although in the colours of the Iraqi Air Force. In Australia, a number of Sea Venom FAW.53s have also survived. Venezuela has the only complete surviving British-built single-seat Venom.

The Polish Aviation Museum (PAL) has a British-built Sea Venom, which was used for experiments at de Havilland and the A&AEE and then was transferred to the Imperial War Museum, which sold it to the PAL in 2013.

Although the Venom was, for its era, a popular and affordable warbird, currently only one example of the type is airworthy, J-1630/ZK-VNM in New Zealand. However, J-1643/HB-RVY in Switzerland is reportedly undergoing work to return it to airworthy status.

== Specifications (Venom FB.1) ==
Orthographically projection of the Venom NF.3, with profile of the FB.1 (FB 50 similar).

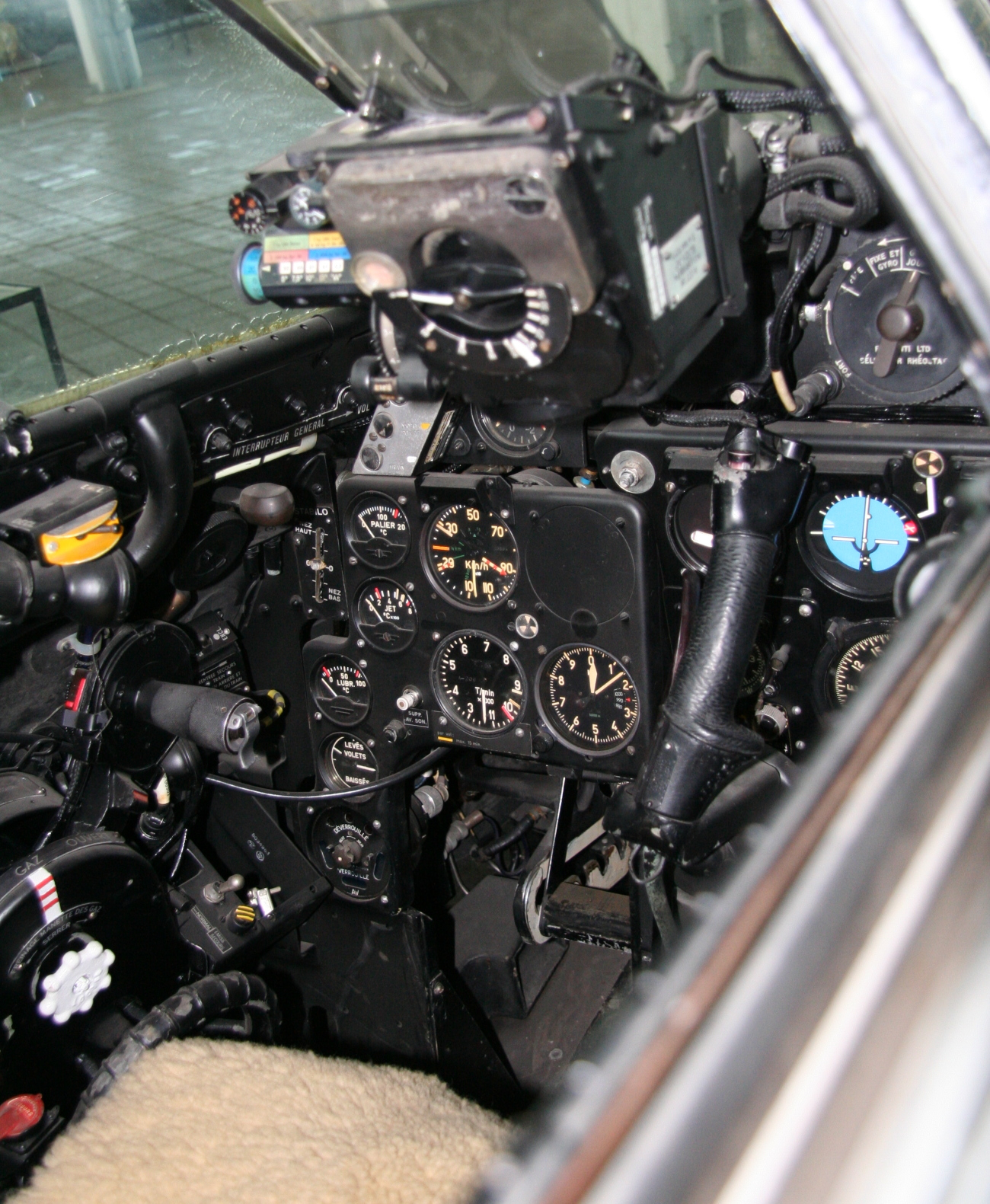
Instrumentation within the cockpit of a preserved Venom

Data from Fighters of the Fifties, International Warplanes

General characteristics

- Crew: 1
- Length: 31 ft 10 in (9.70 m)
- Wingspan: 41 ft 8 in (12.70 m)
- Height: 6 ft 2 in (1.88 m)
- Wing area: 279 sq ft (25.9 m^{2})
- Empty weight: 9,202 lb (4,174 kg)
- Gross weight: 15,400 lb (6,985 kg)
- Powerplant: 1 × de Havilland Ghost 103 centrifugal-flow turbojet engine, 4,850 lbf (21.6 kN) thrust

Performance

- Maximum speed: 640 mph (1,030 km/h, 560 kn)
- Range: 1,080 mi (1,740 km, 940 nmi)
- Service ceiling: 39,400 ft (12,000 m)
- Rate of climb: 9,000 ft/min (46 m/s)
- Wing loading: 56.17 lb/sq ft (274.2 kg/m^{2})
- Thrust/weight: 0.41

Armament

- Guns: 4 × 20 mm (.79 in) Hispano Mk.V cannon, with 600 rounds total (150 rpg).
- Rockets: 8 × RP-3 "60 lb" (27 kg) rockets or
- Bombs: 2 × 1,000 lb (450 kg) MC bombs

== See also ==
External videos
- Preserved Venom performing an aerial display
- In-cockpit view of a Venom flight
- Image compilation of a preserved Venom

Related development

- de Havilland Sea Venom/Aquilon
- de Havilland Vampire
- de Havilland Sea Vixen

Aircraft of comparable role, configuration, and era

- Mikoyan-Gurevich MiG-9
- Republic F-84 Thunderjet
- Saab 21R
- Yakovlev Yak-25 (1947)

Related lists

- List of aircraft of the Royal Air Force
- List of fighter aircraft
