= Swiss Air Force aircraft squadrons =

In the Swiss Air Force, an aircraft usually isn't deployed permanently to a given Squadron, which is especially true of the [militia] squadrons who are not permanently in service. Aircraft are used across several squadrons. Even the aircraft related to the Squadron, such as the F/A-18C J-5017 from 17 Squadron, will be used by other squadrons. Older aircraft will often be retired from front-line service to support squadrons, for example, the Hawker Hunter from a fighter-bomber to a target tug. Two full-scale Hugo Wolf F/A-18C simulators, tail numbers X-5098 and X-5099, are non-flying training simulators for ground crew and not part of any squadron.

| Image | Name | Status | Home base | Aircraft type | History | Notes |
|---|---|---|---|---|---|---|
| | Fliegerstaffel 1 Rokh | Inactive | Dübendorf Air Base | F-5E | Hawker Hunter, DH-100 Vampire, C-3036, Fokker C.V, Häfeli DH-5 | Commander of the Patrouille Suisse was Member of FlSt1. The Patrouille Suisse was Created from parts of the FlSt1 |
| | Fliegerstaffel 2 | Inactive | Payerne Air Base | F-5E | Hawker Hunter, DH-112 Venom, DH-100 Vampire, AFB Ulrichen, Turtmann | |
| | Fliegerstaffel 3 | Inactive | Sion Airport | Mirage IIIRS | Hawker Hunter, DH-112 Venom Recon vers, D-3800, C-3603, Dewoitine D.27 | |
| | Fliegerstaffel 4 | Inactive | Payerne Air Base | Mirage IIIRS | Hawker Hunter, DH-112 Venom, DH-100 Vampire AFB Turtmann, Sankt Stephan | |
| | Fliegerstaffel 5 Lynx | Inactive | Interlaken | Hawker Hunter | DH-100 Vampire, Häfeli DH-5 | Swiss Astronaut Claude Nicollier Pilot at this Sqd |
| | Fliegerstaffel 6 Ducks | active | Payerne Air Base | F-5E | | |
| | Fliegerstaffel 7 | Inactive | Meiringen air base | Hawker Hunter | DH-112 Venom, DH-100 Vampire, Me109, Fokker C.V, AFB Ambri, Interlaken | |
| | Fliegerstaffel 8 Destructors | active | Meiringen air base | F-5E | AFBBuochs Airport | |
| | Fliegerstaffel 9 | Inactive | | DH-112 Venom | DH-100 Vampire, Me109, D-3801, Dewoitine D.27, Fokker C.V | |
| | Fliegerstaffel 10 | Inactive | Buochs Airport | Dassault Mirage IIIRS | DH-112 Venom recon, DH-100 Vampire, C-3603, P-51 Mustang | all equipped with Photocameras |
| | Fliegerstaffel 11 Tigers | active | Meiringen air base | F/A-18 | Dübendorf Air Base, F-5E, Hawker Hunter, DH-100 Vampire, D-3801 | Member of the NATO Tiger Association, F/A-18C J-5011 Squad Aircraft with special paint |
| | Zielflugstaffel 12 | active | Emmen Air Base | Pilatus PC-9/ F-5E | Hawker Hunter, C-36 | |
| | Fliegerstaffel 13 | Inactive | Payerne Air Base | F-5E | DH-112 Venom, D-3800 Morane, Trurtmann AFB, Meiringen air base Ambrì | |
| | Instrumentenfliegerstaffel 14 | active | Locarno | Pilatus PC-7 | DH-100 Vampire, Pilatus P-3 | |
| | Fliegerstaffel 15 | Inactive | Sankt Stephan | Hawker Hunter | DH-112 Venom, DH-100 Vampire, D-3801, Me109, Payerne Air Base | In the last year a Hunter got a "Papyrus" paint this aircraft is now private used |
| | Fliegerstaffel 16 | active | Sion Airport | F-5F | Mirage IIIS, DH-112 Venom & DH-112 R1, DH-100 Vampire, P-51 Mustang C-3603, C-36, Fokker C.V, Buochs Airport | |
| | Fliegerstaffel 17 Falcons | active | Payerne Air Base | F/A-18 | Mirage IIIS, DH-112 Venom, D-3802, C-3603, Häfeli DH-5 Dewoitine D.27 AFB BuochsEmmen, Raron | Sqd Aircraft F/A-18C J-5017 with "Falcons" Paint |
| | Fliegerstaffel 18 Panthers | active | Payerne Air Base | F/A-18 | | Sqd Aircraft F/A-18C J-5018 with "Phanters" Paint |
| | Fliegerstaffel 19 Swans | active | Sion Airport | F-5E | Potez 25, Morane D-3800 P-51 Mustang, DH-112 Venom, Hawker Hunter | |
| | Fliegerstaffel 20 | Inactive | Mollis | Hawker Hunter | DH-112 Venom, DH-100 Vampire, P-51 Mustang, D-3801 | |
| | Fliegerstaffel 21 | Inactive | Raron | Hawker Hunter | DH-112 Venom, DH-100 Vampire, P-51 Mustang, Dewoitine D.27, Me109, AFB Buochs, Turtmann, Dübendorf | |
| | Fliegerstaffel 24 | active | Emmen Air Base | Pilatus PC-9 / F-5F | Hawker Hunter Trainer | Sqd 22 and 23 don't exist |
| | Lufttransportstaffel 1 | active | Payerne Air Base | AS 532UL, AS 332M-1, EC635 | Alouette III | |
| | Lufttransportstaffel 2 | Inactive | Dübendorf Air Base | Alouette III | Aérospatiale Alouette II, Piper Super Cub, AFB Triengen | |
| | Lufttransportstaffel 3 | active | | AS 532UL, AS 332M-1, EC635 | | |
| | Lufttransportstaffel 4 | active | Dübendorf Air Base | AS 532UL, AS 332M-1, EC635, B190, DHC-6, B350 | | Superpuma T-316 with Squadronpainting |
| | Lufttransportstaffel 5 | active | Dübendorf Air Base | AS 532UL, AS 332M-1, EC635 | Alouette IIIDornier Do 27Aérospatiale Alouette II | |
| | Lufttransportstaffel 6 | active | Alpnach | AS 532UL, AS 332M-1 EC635 | | |
| | Lufttransportstaffel 7 | active | Emmen Air Base | Pilatus PC-6 | | |
| | Lufttransportstaffel 8 | active | Alpnach | AS 532UL, AS 332M-1 EC635 | Aérospatiale Alouette III | [www.lufttransportstaffel8.ch] |

== Other aircraft units ==
| Image | Name | Status | Homebase | Aircrafttype | History | Notes |
|---|---|---|---|---|---|---|
| | Berufsfliegerkorps | active | Dübendorf Air Base HQ | all AC types | | former UeG Überwachungsgeschwader |
| | Lufttransportdienst des Bundes | active | Bern Airport | Cessna Citation Excel, DHC-6, B350, B1900, Falcon 900, EC635 | Learjet 35, Falcon 50, Eurocopter Dauphin | |
| | Pilotenschule | active | Emmen Air Base | Pilatus PC-21 | F-5F, BAE Hawk, DH-100 VampireT | |
| | Drohnenstaffel 7 | active | Emmen Air Base | ADS-95 | | |
| | GRD Armasuisse | active | Emmen Air Base | Pilatus PC-6 Turbo-Porter, Pilatus PC-12, Diamond DA42 Aurora Centauer | Hawker Hunter, Mirage IIIC, F-5E(J-3001) | Flight test Service |
| | Patrouille Suisse | active | Emmen Air Base | F-5E | Hawker Hunter AFB Dübendorf | Created from parts of the Fliegerstaffel 1 |
| | PC-7 Team | active | Dübendorf Air Base | Pilatus PC-7 | | |
| | MHR Militär-Helikopter-Rettungsdienst | Inactive | | | Alouette III | SAR, Today made by the civil Rega (air rescue) |
| | ADDC | active | Dübendorf Air Base | | | Air Force HQ, Air Operations Centre, Air Defence& Directions Center |
| | Parachute Reconnaissance Company 17 | active | Locarno | MT-1 | | Para reccon |

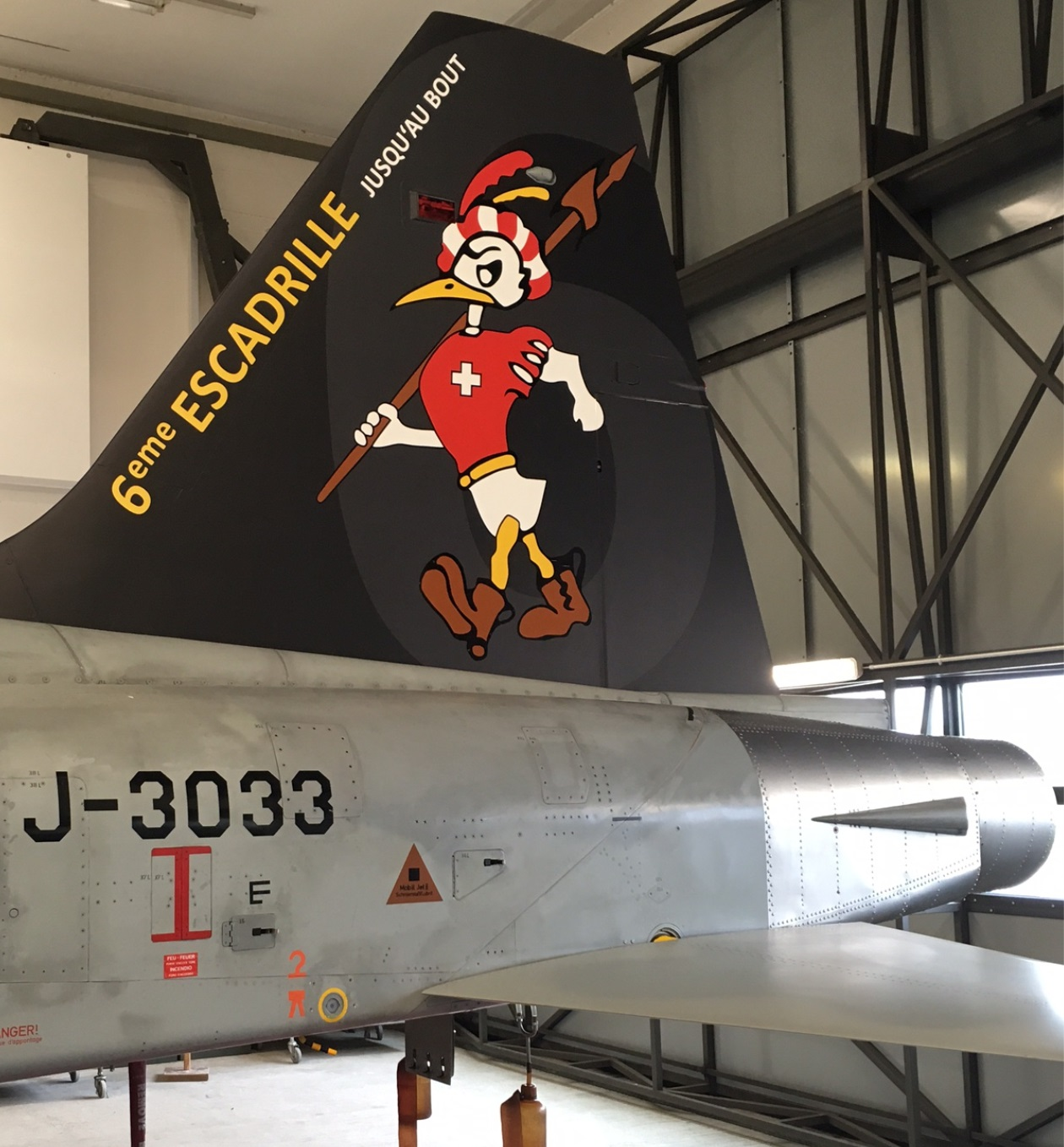
Tail of F-5E J-3033 FlSt6

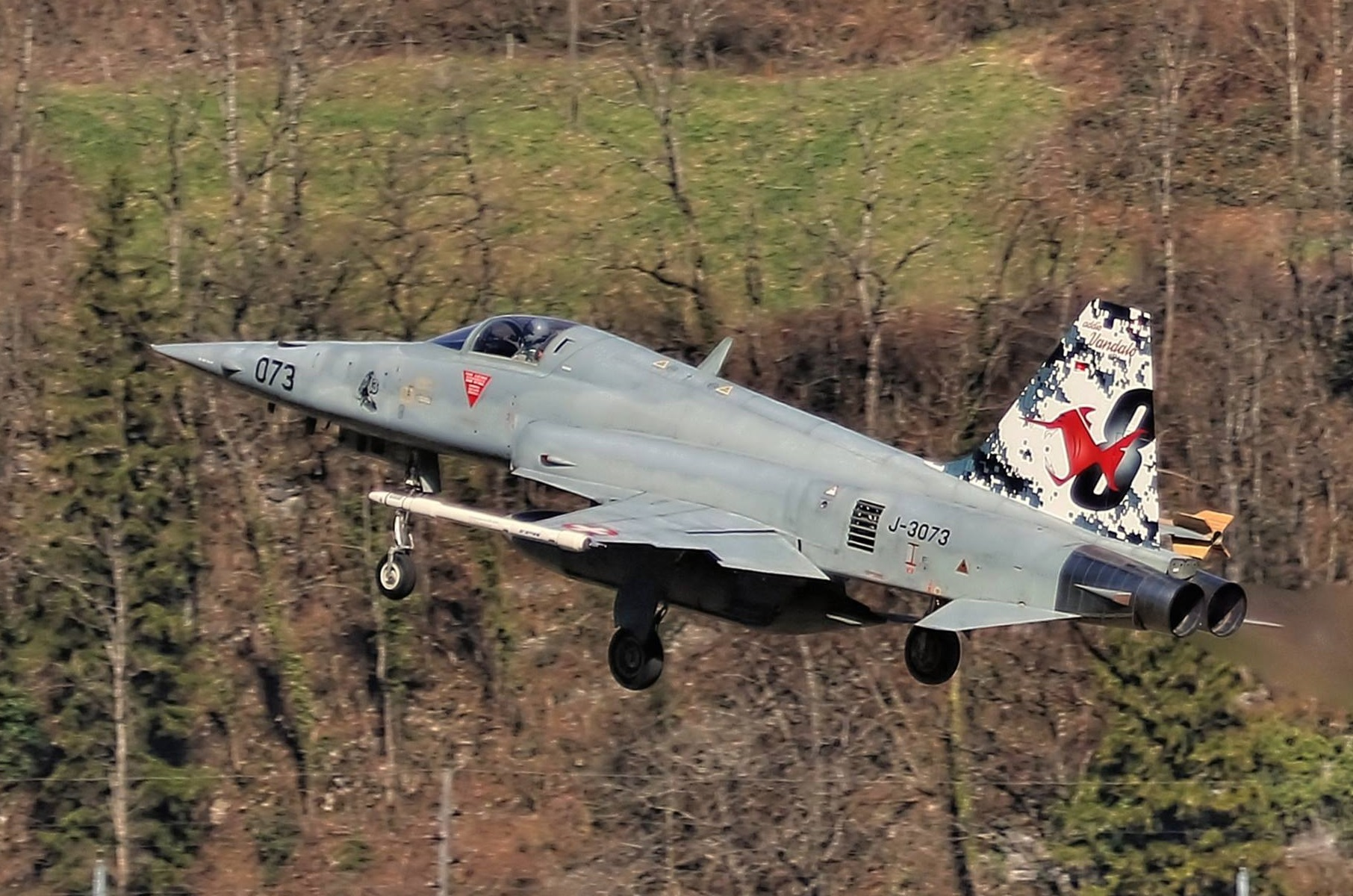
F-5E J-3073 Vandalos FlSt8

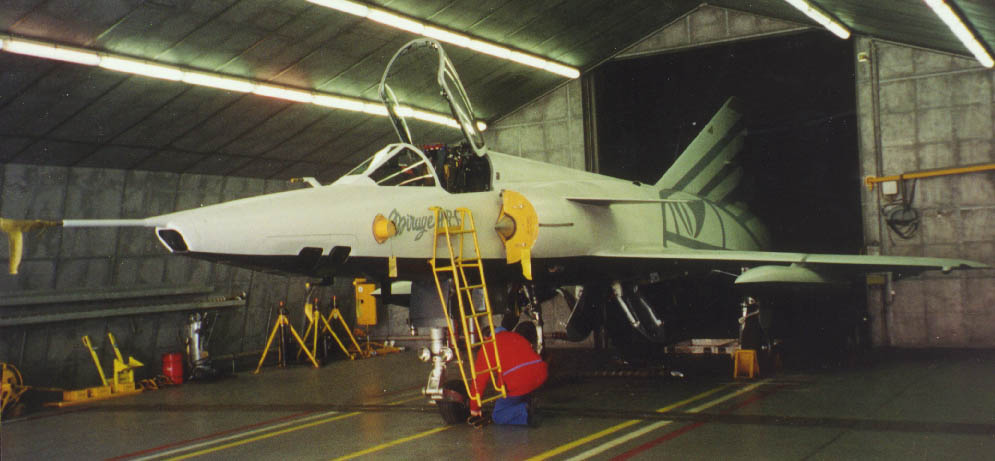
MirageIIIRS FlSt10

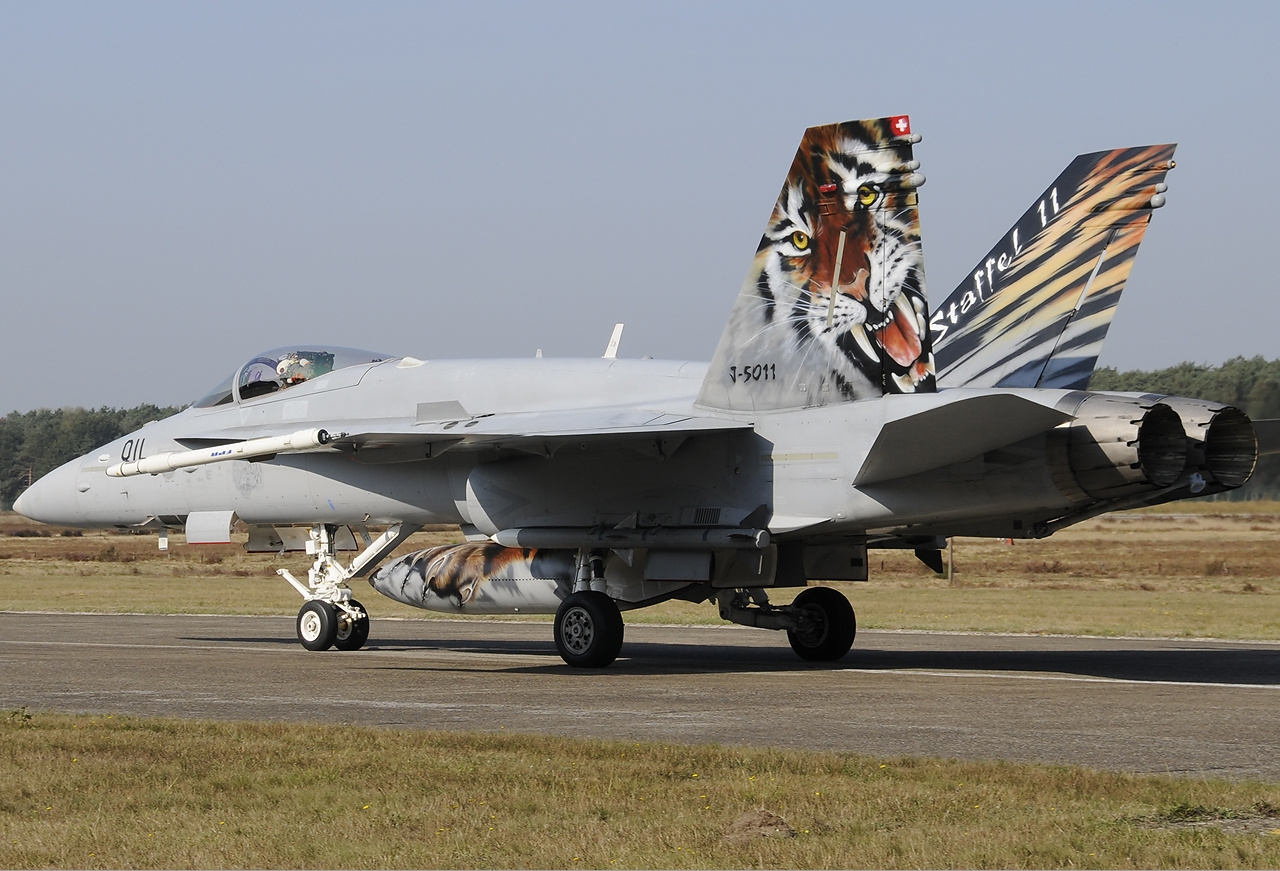
F/A-18C J-5011 Tigers FlSt11

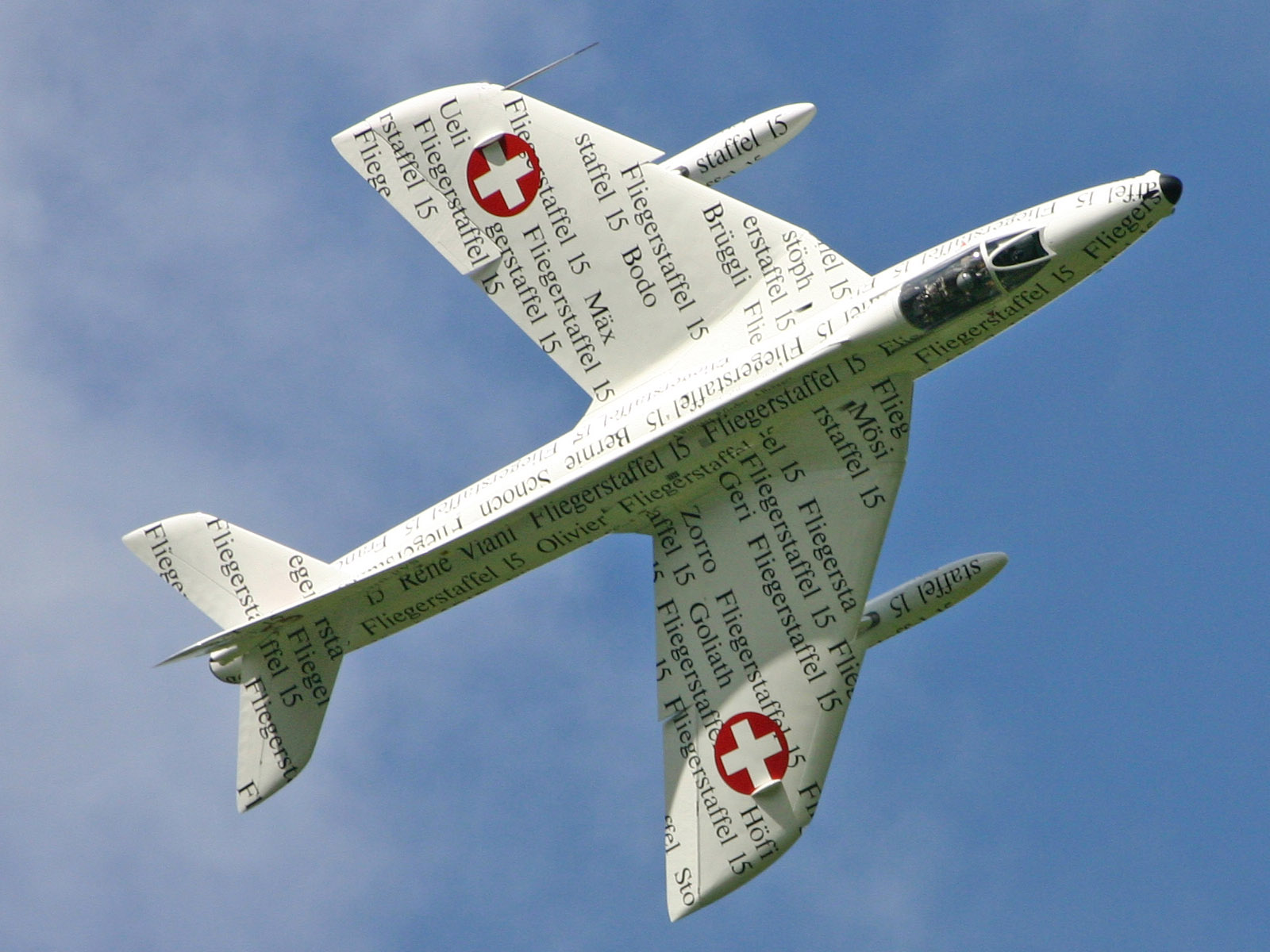
Paper Hunter FlSt15

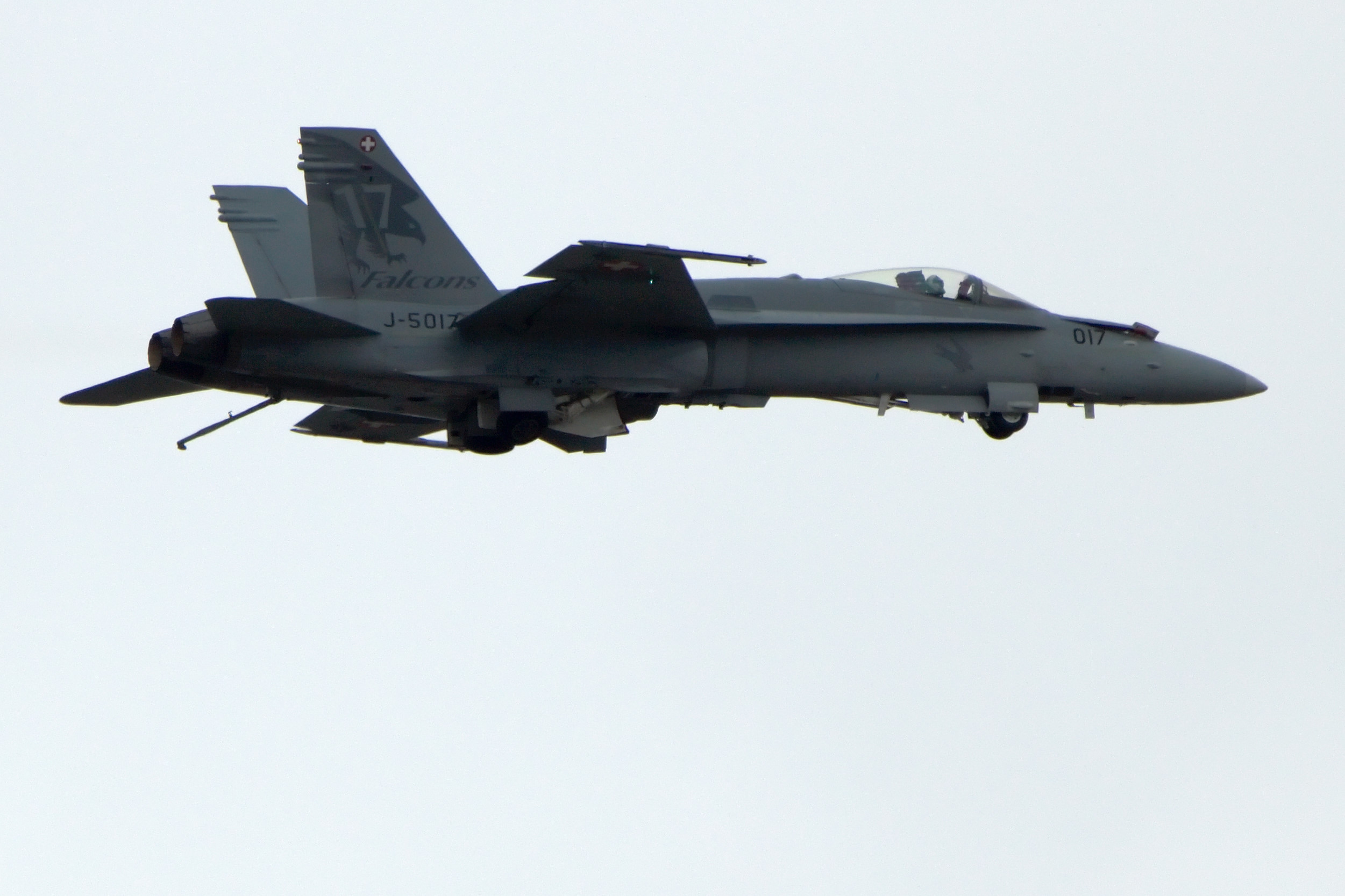
F/A-18C J-5017 Falcons FlSt17

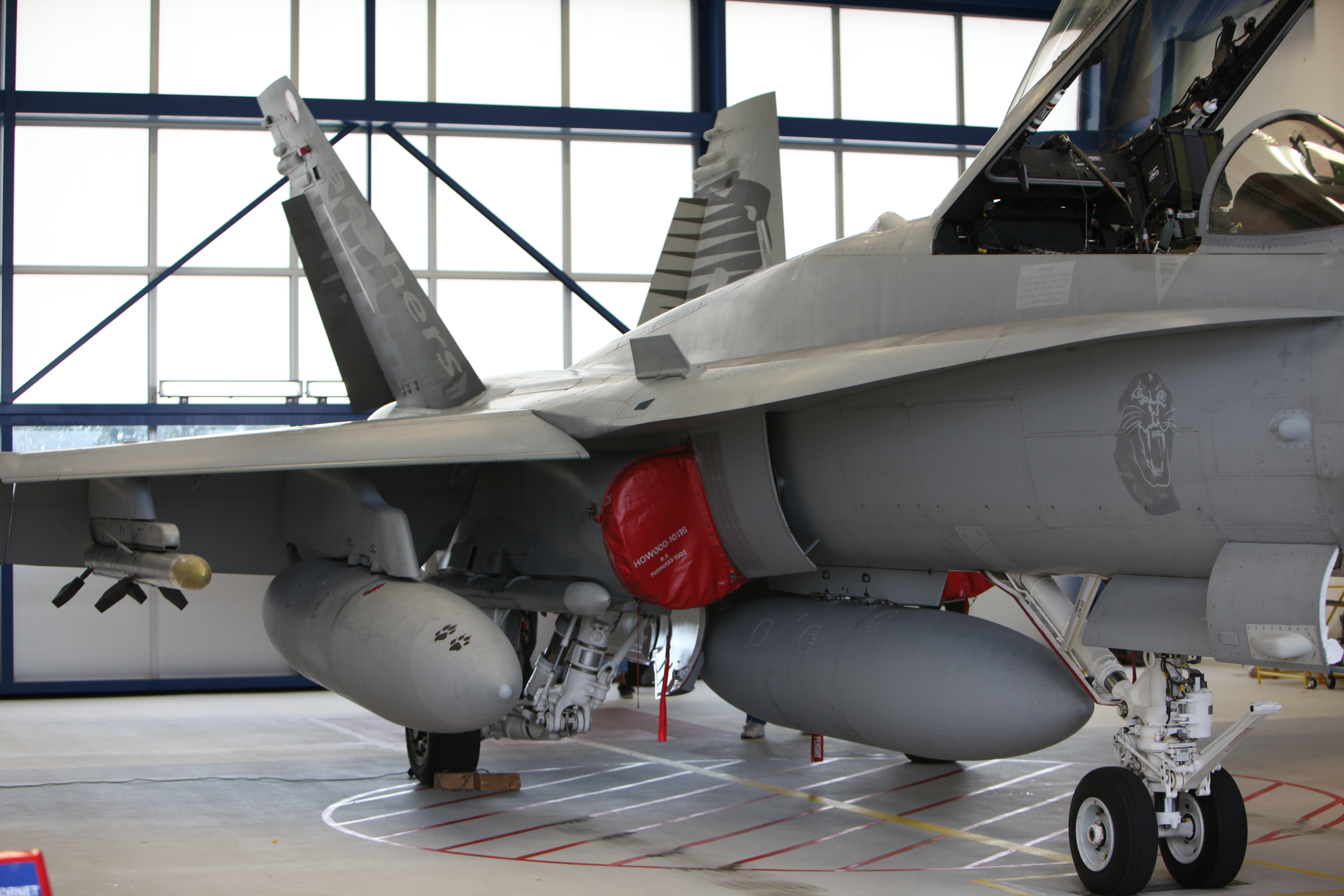
F/A-18C J-5018 Panthers FlSt 18

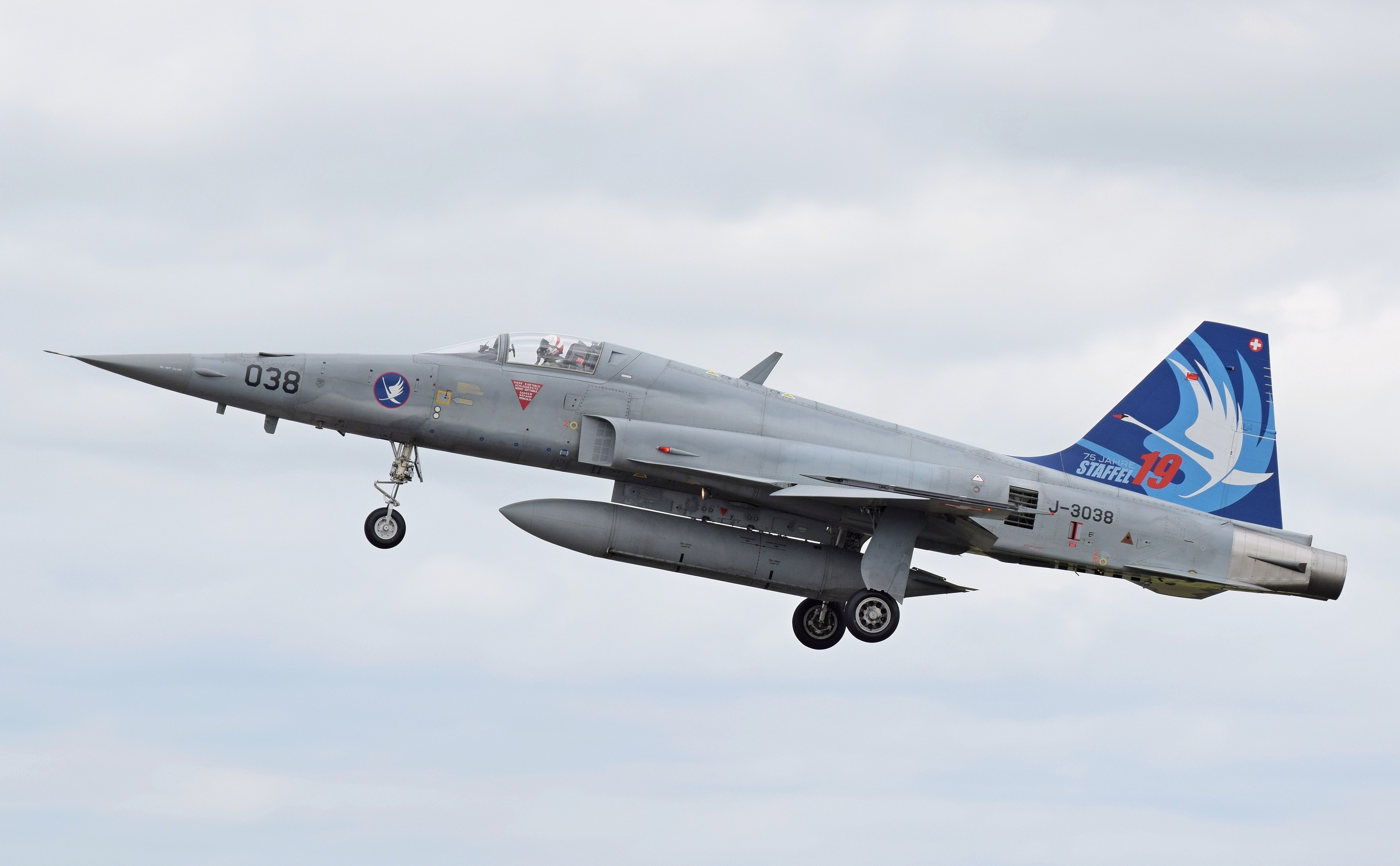
F-5E Swans FlSt19

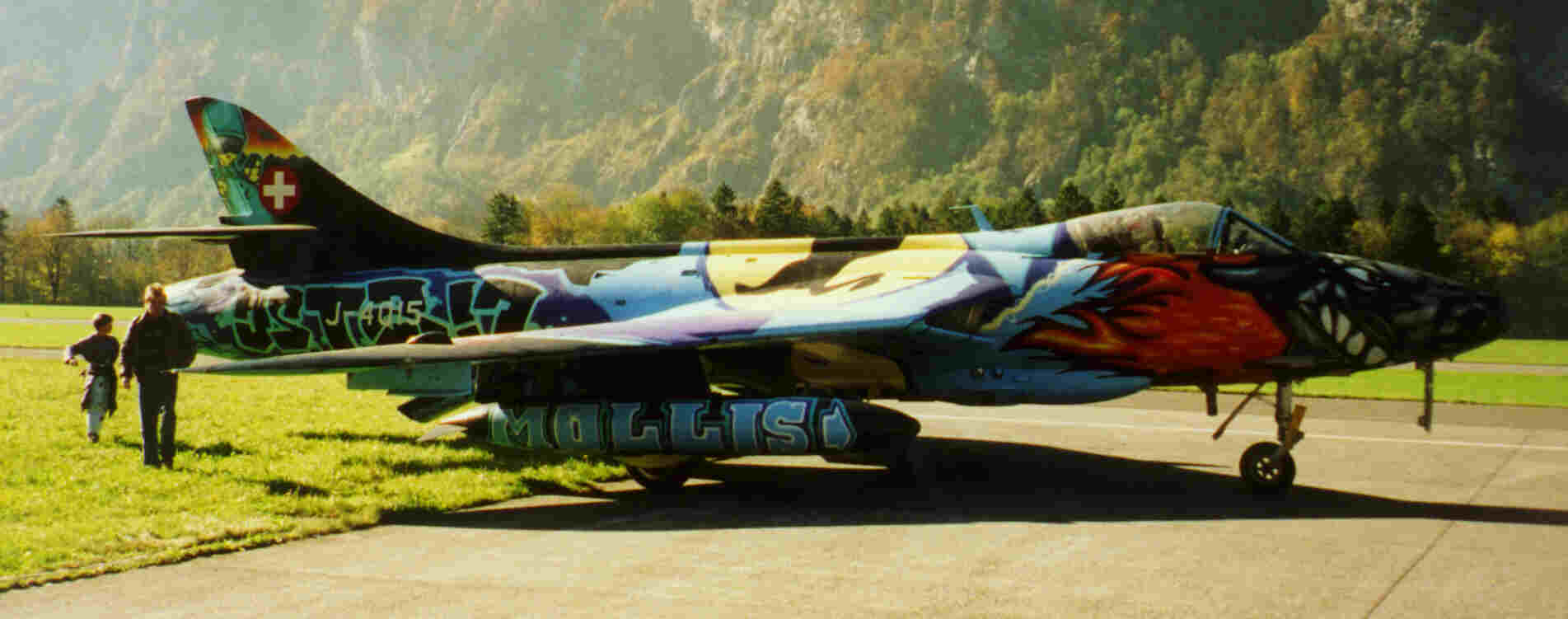
Bison Hunter FlSt20

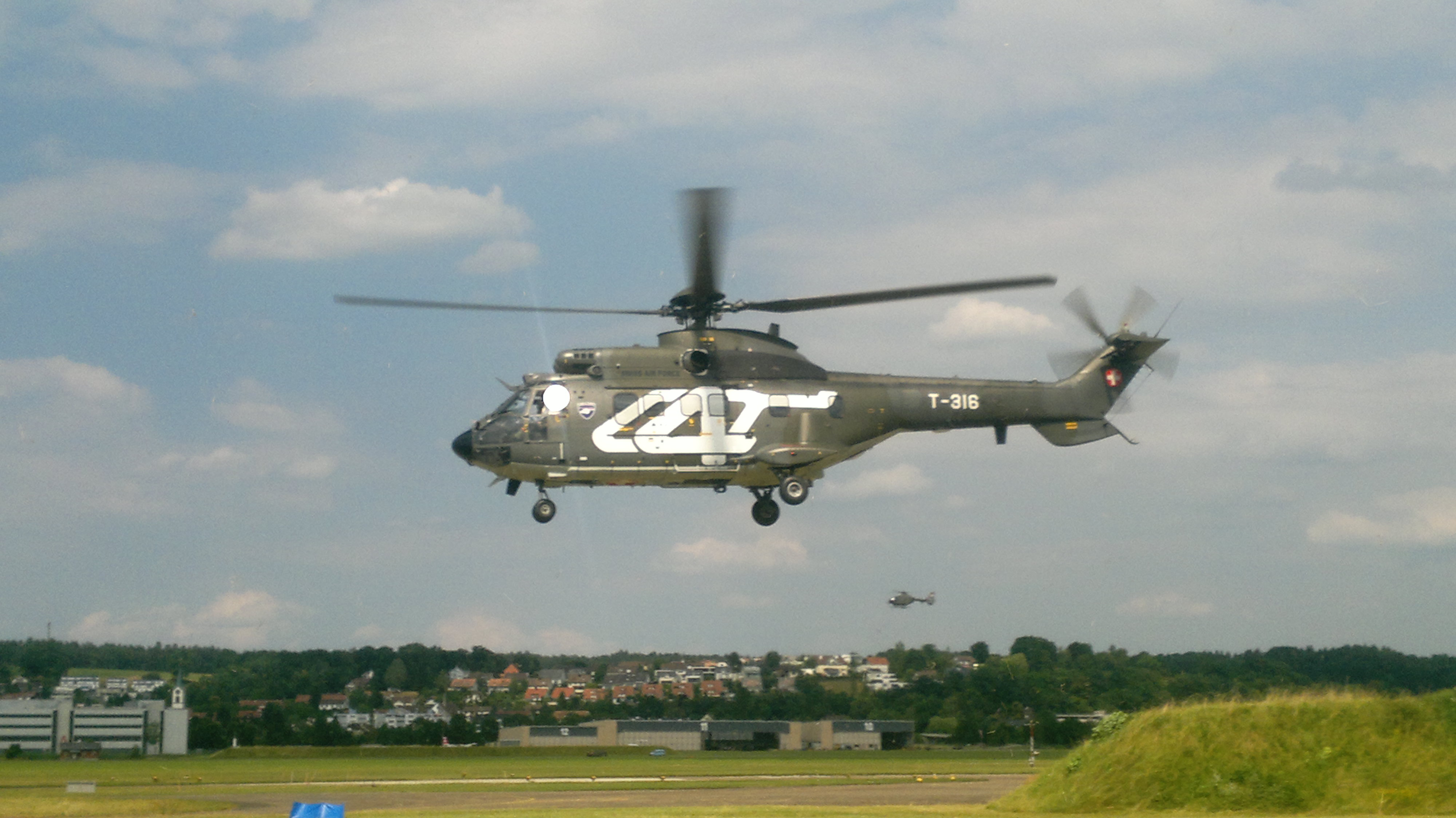
Superpuma T-316 LT4

Media related to Aircraft squadrons of the air force of Switzerland at Wikimedia Commons
