= Fliegerstaffel 13 =

Fliegerstaffel 13 13ème Escadrille Squadriglia d'aviazione 13
- F-5E J-3052 with squadron emblem Fliegerstaffel 13
- Active: 1925-2000
- Country: Switzerland
- Branch: Swiss Air Force
- Role: Fighter squadron
- Garrison/HQ: Payerne Air Base

Fliegerstaffel 13 (No 13 squadron) of the Swiss Air Force was equipped with Northrop F-5 flown by militia pilots when disbanded in 2000. Their home base at the dissolution was Payerne Air Base. Fliegerstaffel 13 wore a shield-shaped insignia with a blue outer edge, showing an eagle with wings spread out and open claws ready to capture its prey, against a white background, with the red number 13 in front of the upper wing. The old emblem was round with an orange background and black border. It showed the stylized side view of a black wasp looking in the direction of the viewer; over its head was the number 13.

== History ==
The unit was founded in 1925 under the designation Fliegerkompanie 13 equipped with Fokker C.V at Ambri Airport.

In 1940, the unit changed to the Morane D-3800 and Morane D-3801 aircraft. In 1945, during a reorganization, the flying staff of the Fliegerkompanie 13 was transferred to the newly created Fliegerstaffel 13.

From 1955 until 1983, the squadron used its first jet aircraft, the De Havilland D.H. 112 Venom, operating from the aircraft cavern.

In 1984 the Fliegerstaffel 13 started to fly the F-5 Tiger. At the same time, Meiringen Air Base became their new war time base, thus flight operations there would be carried out out of an aircraft cavern.

In 1995, Fliegerstaffel 13 changed to the new home base, Payerne Air Base with the F-5E.

In 2000 the Fliegerstaffel 13 was disbanded.

== Airplanes ==
- Fokker C.V
- Morane D-3800
- Morane D-3801
- de Havilland Venom
- Northrop F-5
