= Drohnenstaffel 7 =

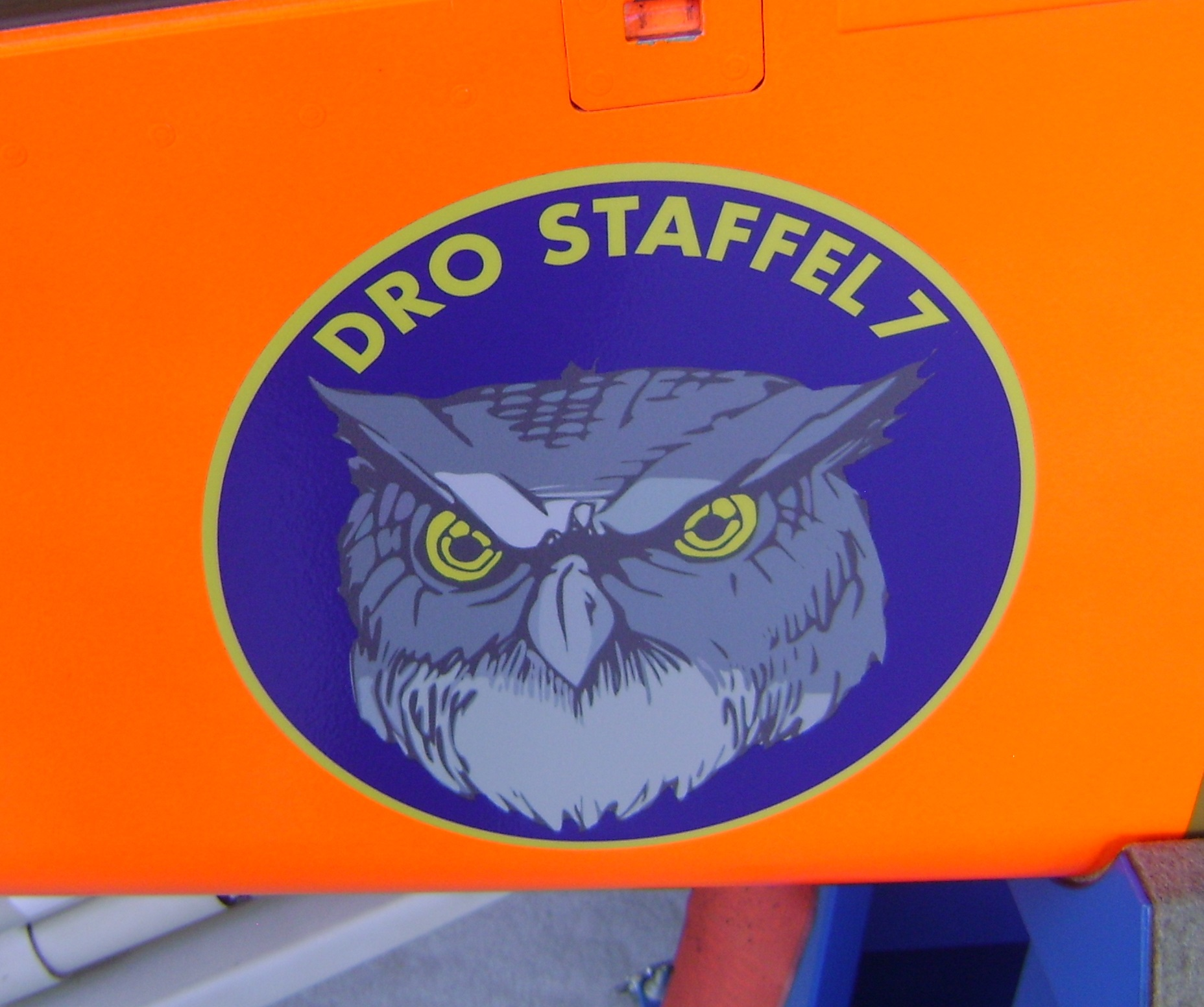
- Badge Drohnenstaffel 7
- Active: 1995- today
- Country: Switzerland
- Branch: Swiss Air Force
- Role: UAV Recon
- Garrison/HQ: Militärflugplatz Emmen

The Drohnesstaffel 7 is a Militia squadron, stationed on the Militärflugplatz Emmen and is under the drone command 84 (Dro Kdo 84). Drohnesstaffel 7 has as Coat of arms a round badge that shows the head of an owl against a dark blue background and the yellow inscription "Dro Staffel 7". It is the only UAV squadron of the Swiss Air Force. The owl symbolizes the good sight of the UAV sensors by day and night.

== History ==
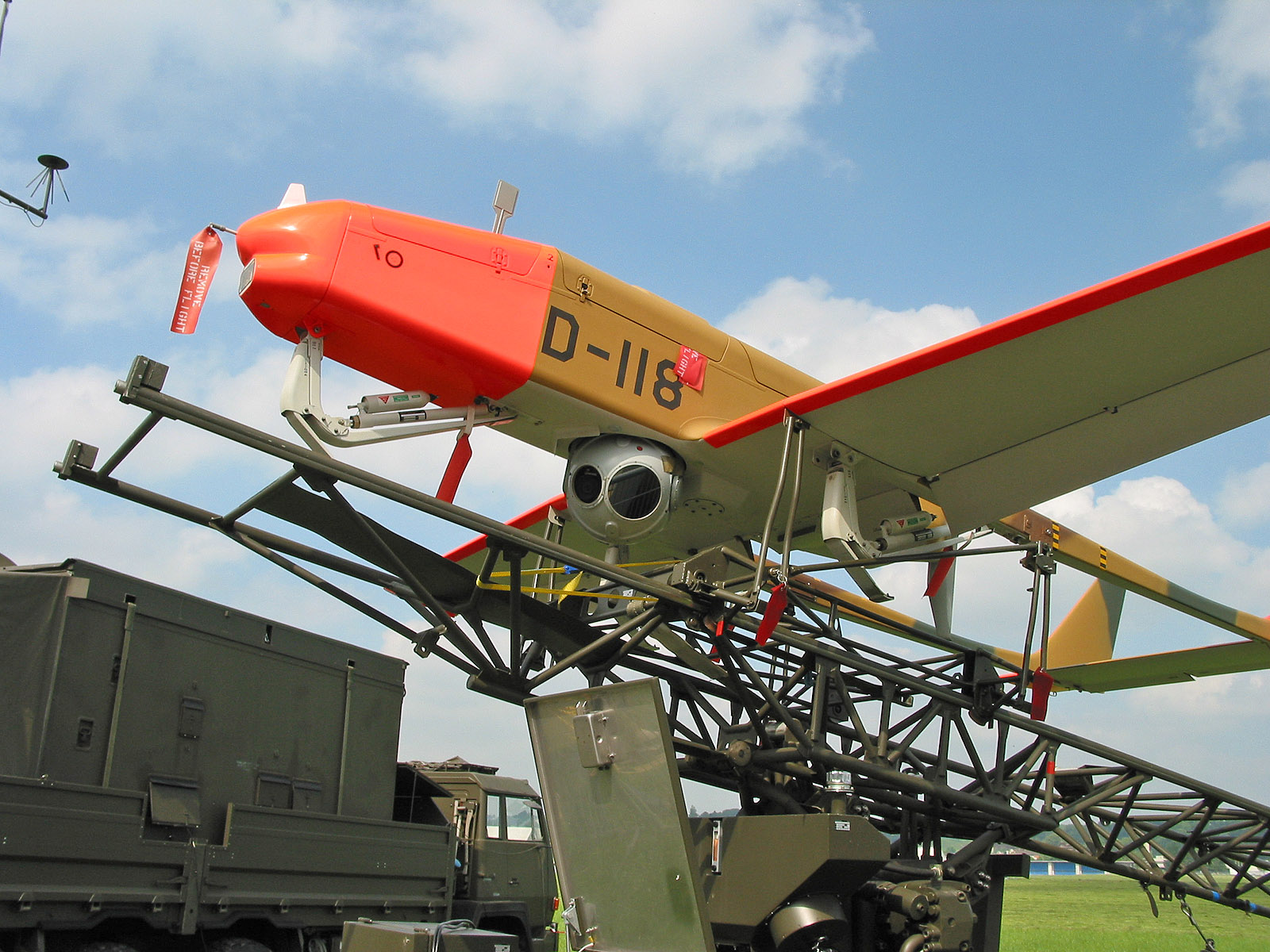
UAV ADS 95 D-118 for demonstration purposes on the start-catapult.

In 1995, the ADS 95 reconnaissance system was procured, and the "Dronesstaffel 7" was founded. In the beginning, they used ADS 95. Today 15 units are still in use. The drone with the number D-119 crashed on 13 September 2011.

The Drohnesstaffel 7 consists of the following functions: The commander, his deputy, the payload operator, the pilot, the airborne Surveillance officer, the drone commandant for the Artillery (Dro SKdt), the dispatch officer and the intelligence officer. The tasks of the Dronesstaffel 7 are the real-time data acquisition by day and by night, the optical verification of information from other sources and the support of the artillery for the fire control.

The Drohnenstaffel 7 is also used in Switzerland for civilian tasks. Thus, for example, The Swiss Air Force carried out explorations in favor of the National Emergency Operations Centre in the large flood in Central Switzerland in 2005 and has been supporting the Swiss Border Guard since the middle of 2006 in monitoring the Swiss border. In the city of Zurich, the use of drones was approved during the UEFA Euro 2008 for monitoring the traffic and security situation or such events like the Street Parade.

As a result of the small silhouette and low visibility for other pilots, the ADS-95 is accompanied by an aircraft (usually a Pilatus PC-6) in peacetime during the day if the ADS-95 is in civilian VFR airspace. These escorts are called "OMBRA" flights; "Ombra" is also the callsign of the accompanying aircraft. The 15 Ruag Ranger are still in use are replaced by six Elbit Hermes 900 according to the 'Armament Program 2015'. The Elbit Hermes 900 will be used in the Swiss Air Force under the designation ADS 15. It is not known whether the Drohnenstaffel 7 remain, with putting the ADS 95 out of service and the introduction of six ADS 15, a Milizstaffel or changes to the Berufsfliegerkorps.

== Aircraft ==
- ADS 95 (current)
- ADS 15 (in the future)
