= Lufttransport Staffel 2 =

Transport squadron of the Swiss Air Force

Lufttransport Staffel 2 Escadrille Transport Aérien 2
- Active: 1965 - 2000
- Country: Switzerland
- Branch: Swiss Air Force
- Role: transport squadron
- Garrison/HQ: Alpnach Air Base

Lufttransport Staffel 2 (LT St 2) was a transport squadron of the Swiss Air Force and belonged to the Überwachungsgeschwader. The Lufttransport Staffel 2 was most recently equipped with Alouette III and had its homebase on the Alpnach Air Base.

The Lufttransport Staffel 2 carried as a coat of arms the top view on a gray-wavy dragonfly with a gray-white number 2 in the background. The badge was round, with a blue background and a gray white outer edge.

== History ==
The Lufttransport Staffel 2 was founded 1965 as Light aircraft squadron. This happened together with the founding of three more transport squadrons. It was only assigned to the Feldarmeekorps 2. The aircraft inventory of the Lufttransport Staffel 2 consisted of nine Alouette II helicopters and four Piper Super Cubs. The home base was the Airfield Triengen.

From 1970 onwards the Lufttransport Staffel 2 operated from Reichenbach, until 1973 the Piper Super Cub was put out of service. Between 1972 and 1974 the Alouette III was added.

On October 21, 1982 the Lufttransport Staffel 2 was hit by a tragic accident between Urnäsch and the Schwägalp Pass when the Alouette III V-211 touched the Rossfall cable with the nose wheel. The pilot and five soldiers of the Fus Kp I / 70 died.

In 1992 the Alouette II was put out of service in the Lufttransport Staffel 2. In 1995, because of the so-called "Armeereform95" (Military reform 95) the Light aircraft squadron 2 was renamed into Lufttransport Staffel 2 (LT St 2).

The Lufttransport Staffel 2 was dissolved on Buochs Airport on June 30, 2000. For the farewell, the Alouette III with the tailnumber V-203 was given a special silver lacquer with the coat of arms of the LT St 2 painted as well as the blue inscription "finito addio" on both sides. This machine was presented to the audience by Major Markus Just, the last commander of the LT St 2.

== Aircraft ==
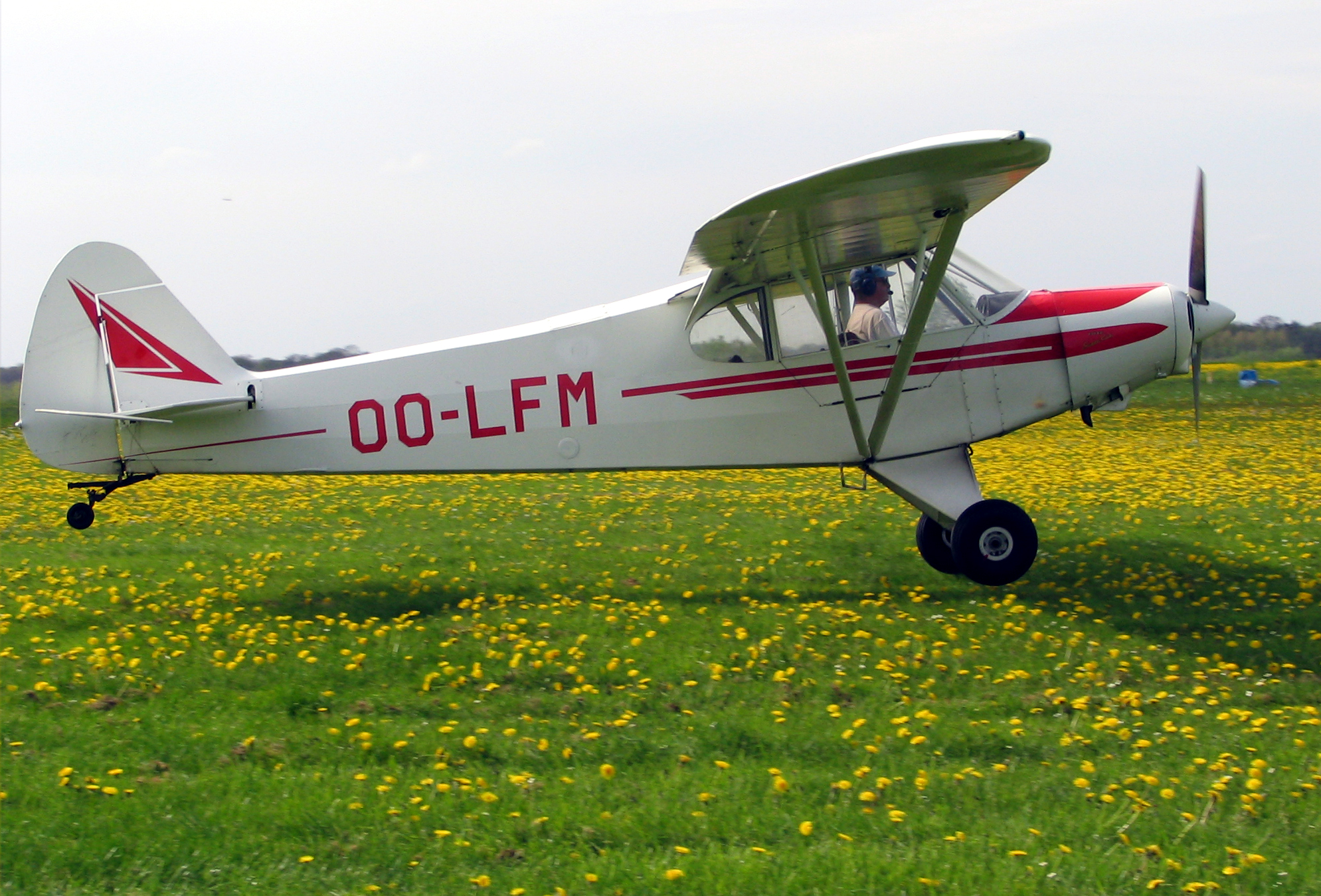
Piper PA-18 Super Cub

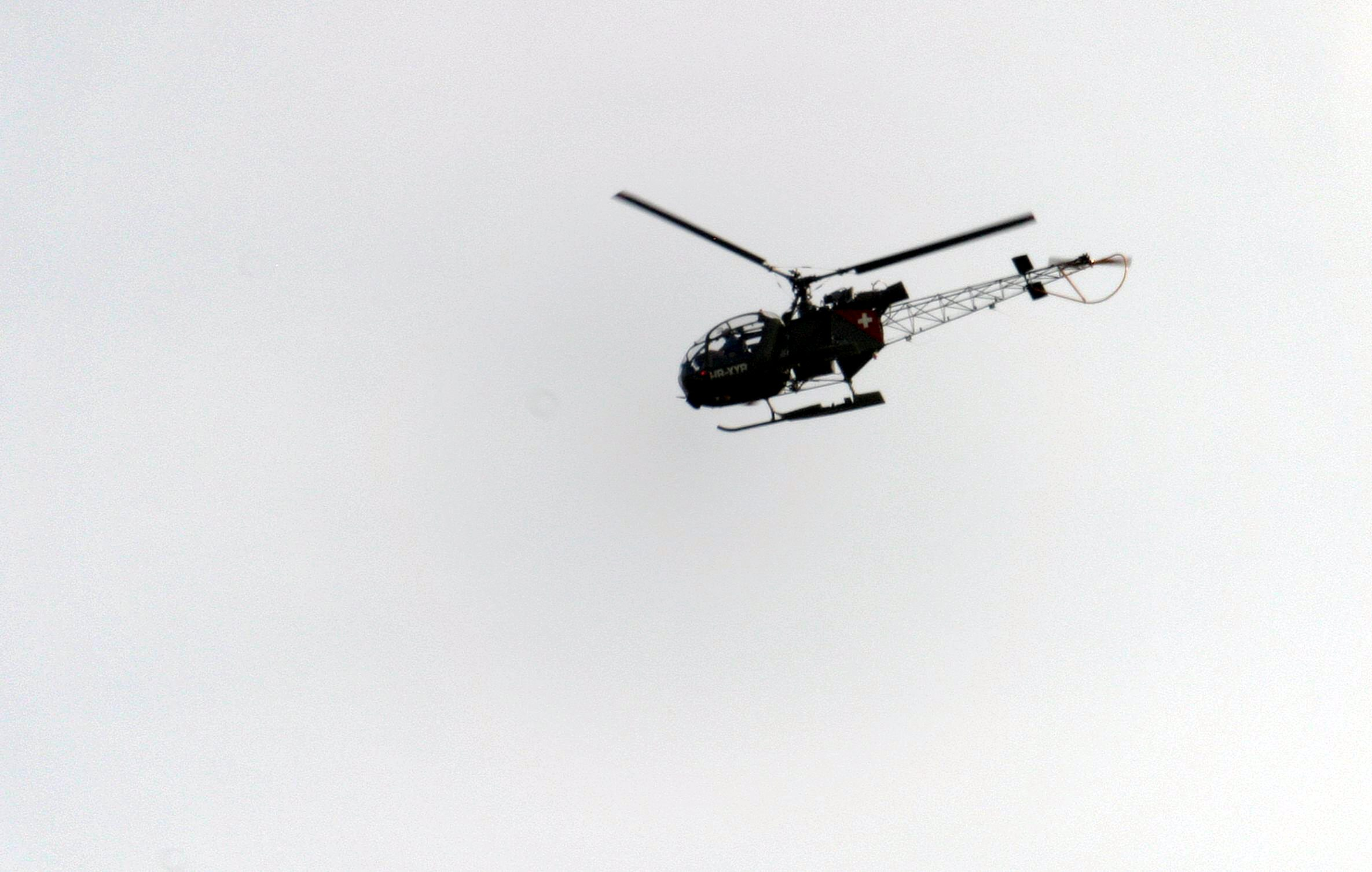
Alouette II

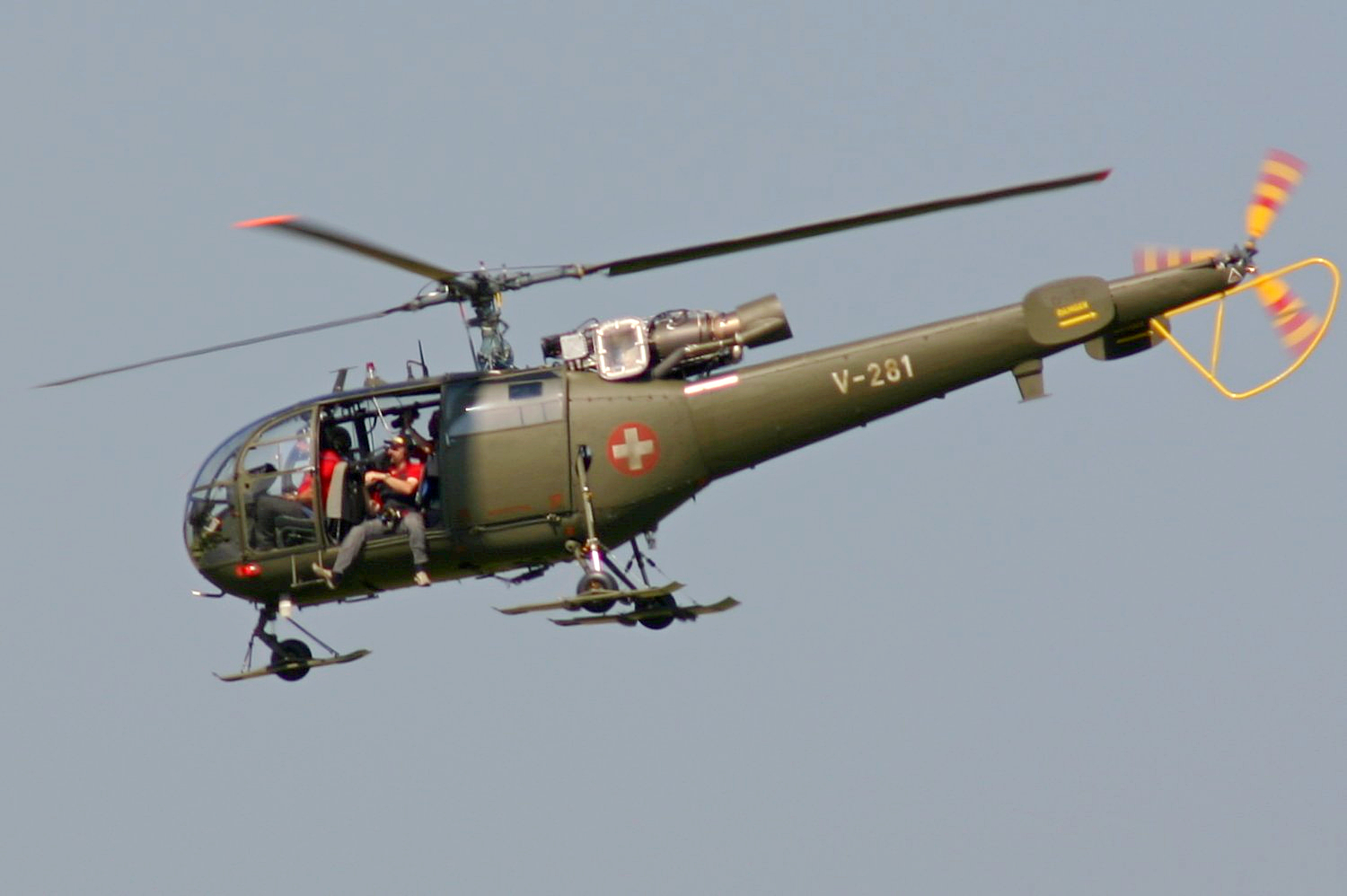
Alouette III
