= Fliegerstaffel 21 =

Fliegerstaffel 21 21ème Escadrille Squadriglia d'aviazione 21
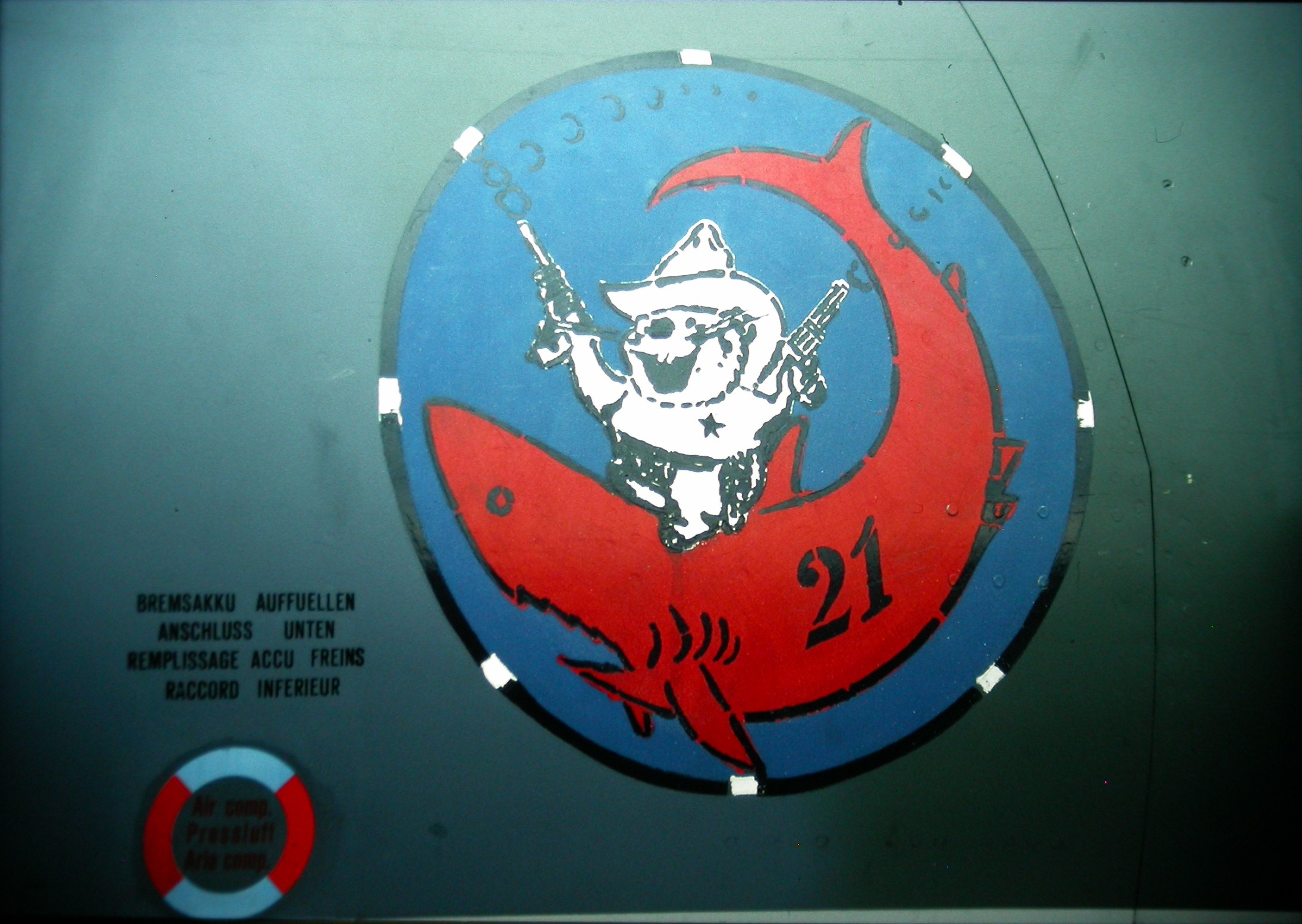
- Squadron emblem of Fliegerstaffel 21
- Active: 1936–1994
- Country: Switzerland
- Branch: Swiss Air Force
- Role: Fighter squadron
- Garrison/HQ: Raron Military Airfield

Fliegerstaffel 21 was a Swiss Air Force squadron equipped with Hawker Hunter aircraft at the dissolution in 1994. Their home base was at the Raron Military Airfield. As a coat of arms, Fliegerstaffel 21 carried a white beaver, firing two guns while riding a red shark. On the shark is the black digit 21.

== History ==
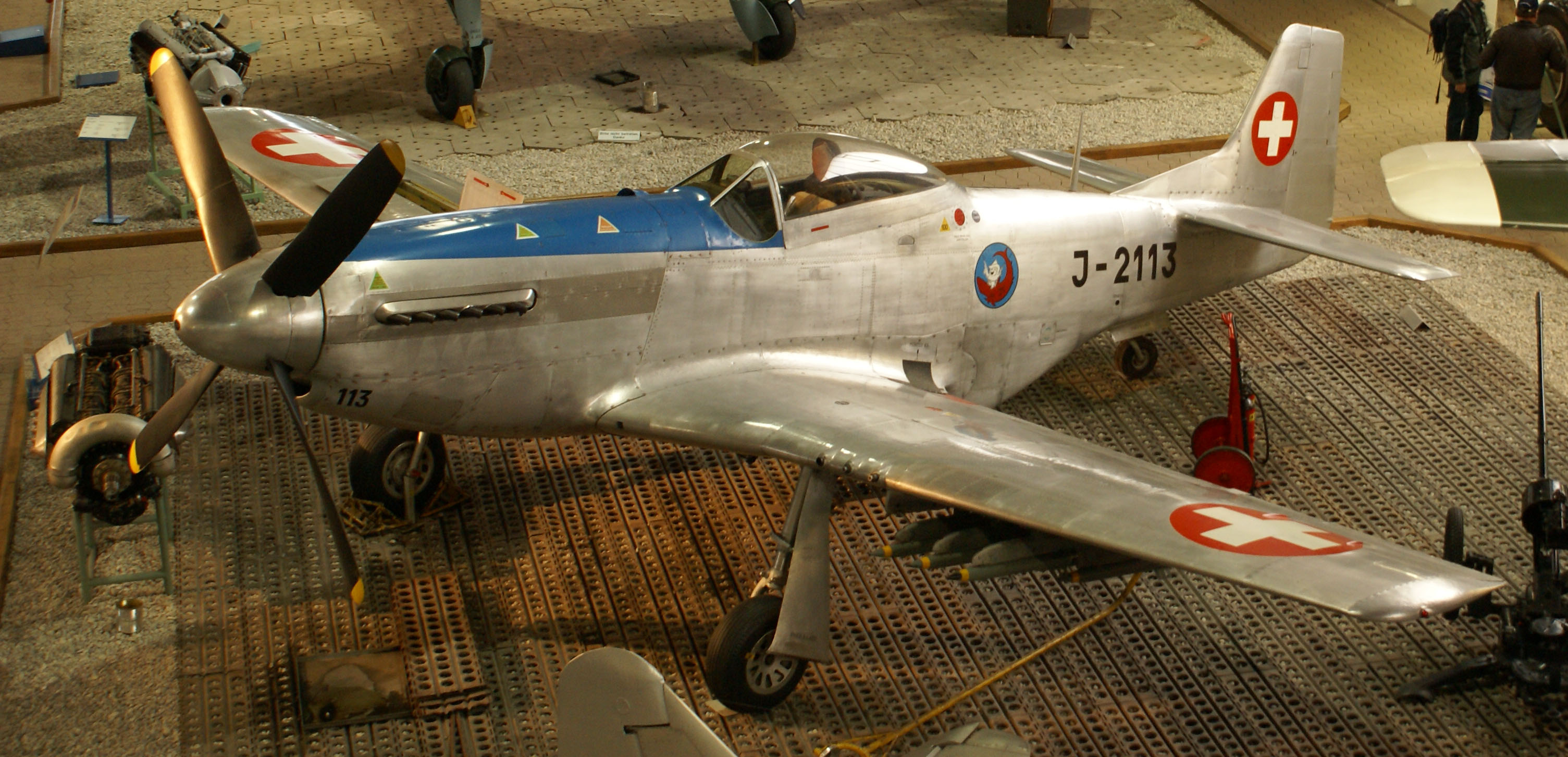
P-51 Mustang J-2113 of Fliegerstaffel 21

The unit was founded in 1936 under the designation Fliegerkompanie 21 and used Dewoitine D-27 aircraft. From 1939 until 1945 the Fliegerkompanie 21 used Messerschmitt Bf 109 E, their home base initially being the military airfield at Dübendorf. However, the FlKp21 was stationed during the war on the Airfield Buochs (1942) and the Military Airfield Payerne. In 1945, a unit consisting of the pilots only was formed and named Fliegerstaffel 21. From 1945 to 1948 it used the Morane D‐3800. This was followed by the P-51 Mustang from 1948 to 1958. The transition to the first jet, the De Havilland D.H. 100 Vampire, took place as early as 1956. The Vampire remained their aircraft until 1957 and was then replaced by De Havilland D.H. 112 Mk 4 Venom. De Havilland D.H. 112 Mk 4 Venom was used at the unit until 1960. One year earlier, in 1959, the military airfield at Buochs became the new home base and in the same year, Fliegerstaffel 21 commenced the introduction of the Hawker Hunter. In 1968, Turtmann became the new home of Fliegerstaffel 21. However, this changed again in 1982, and nearby Raron Airfield became the new home base. This remained the location of Fliegerstaffel 21 until it was dissolved in 1993. Above Fliegerstaffel 21 is a gap in the sequence of the squadrons. The Swiss Air Force had 22 squadrons, but there were no Fliegerstaffel 22 and Fliegerstaffel 23. The 22nd squadron was called Fliegerstaffel 24. The Swiss Air Force meant to appear larger during the Second World War than it was.

== Airplanes ==
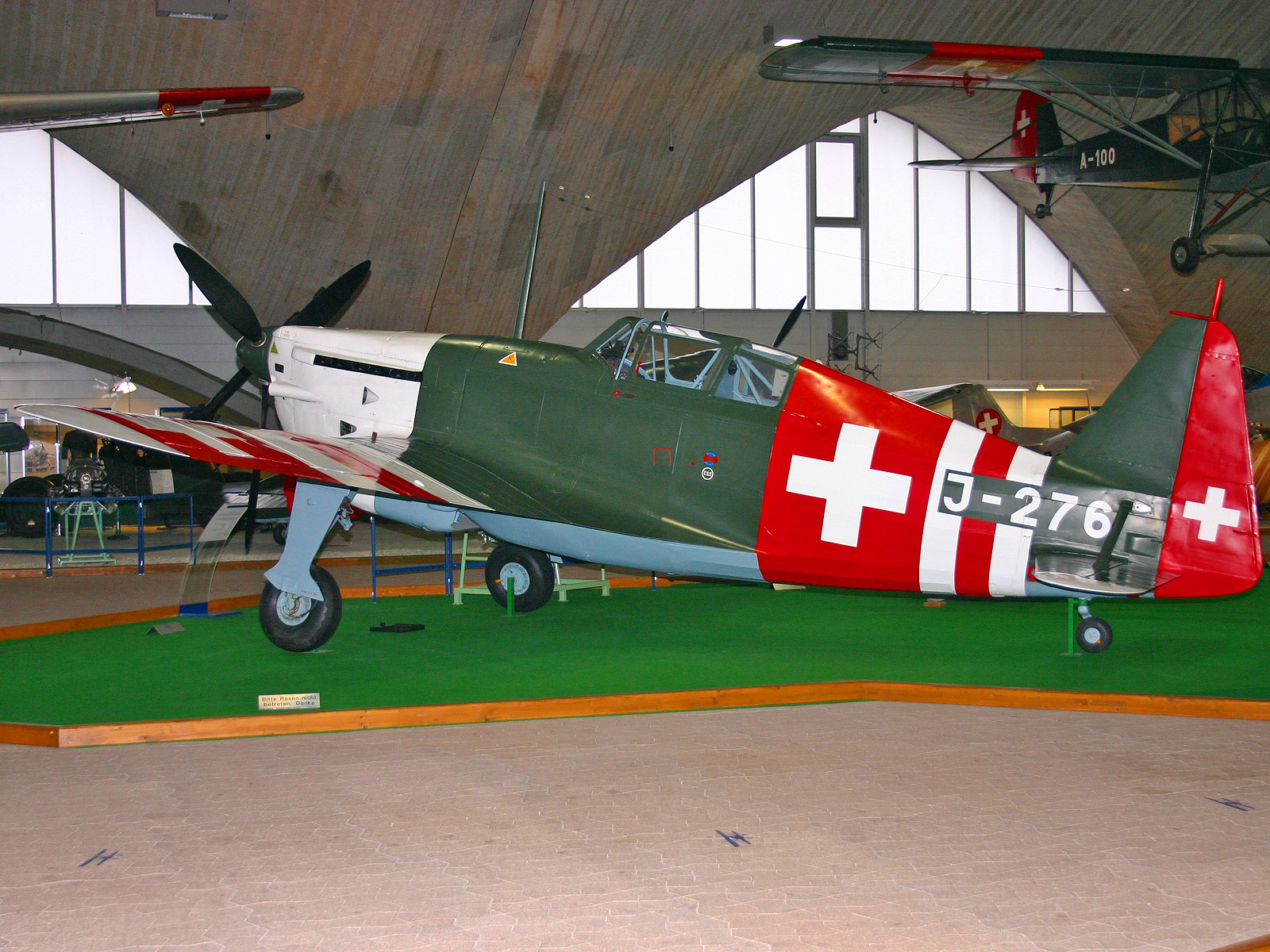
Morane D-3801

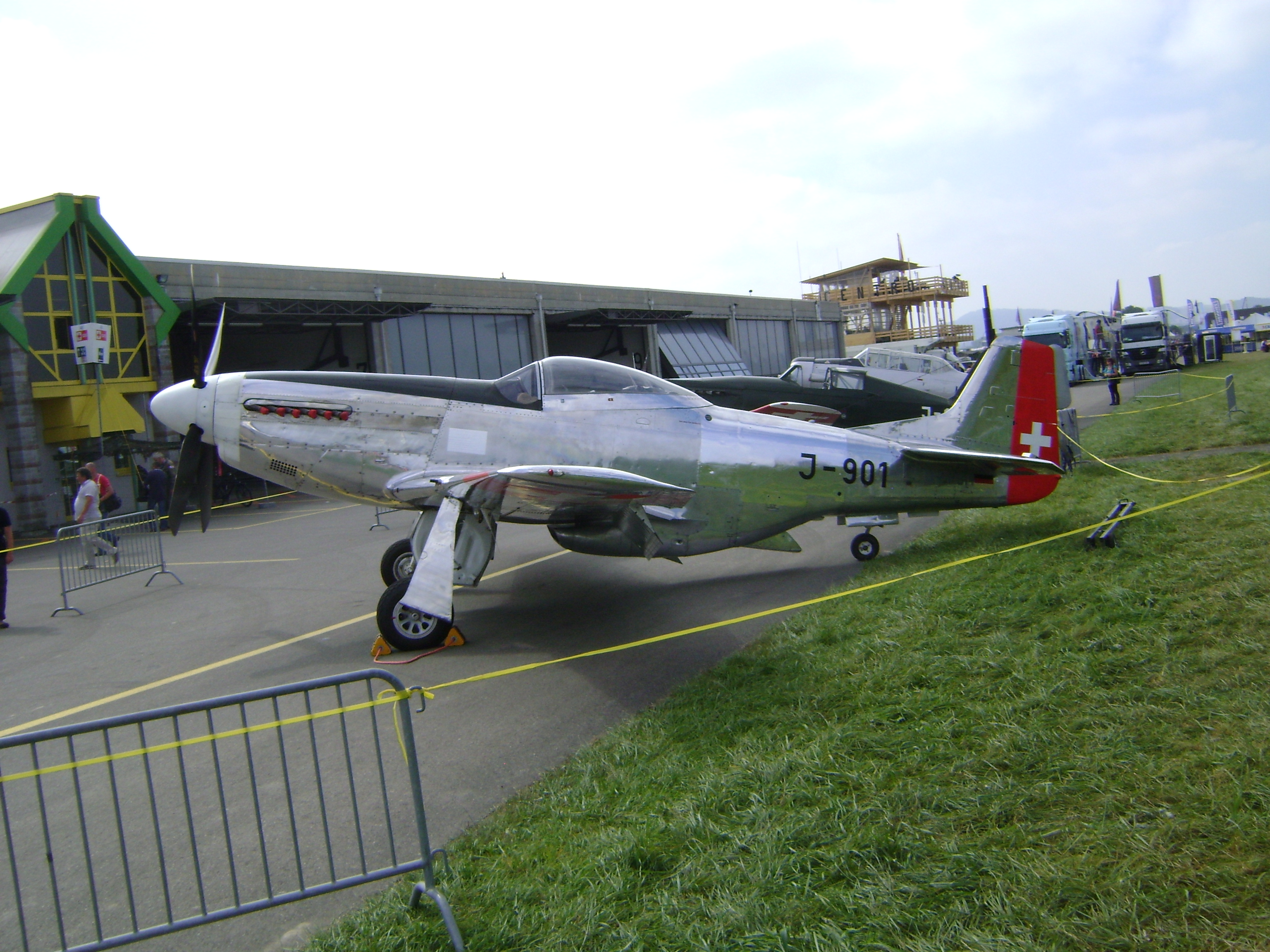
P-51 Mustang

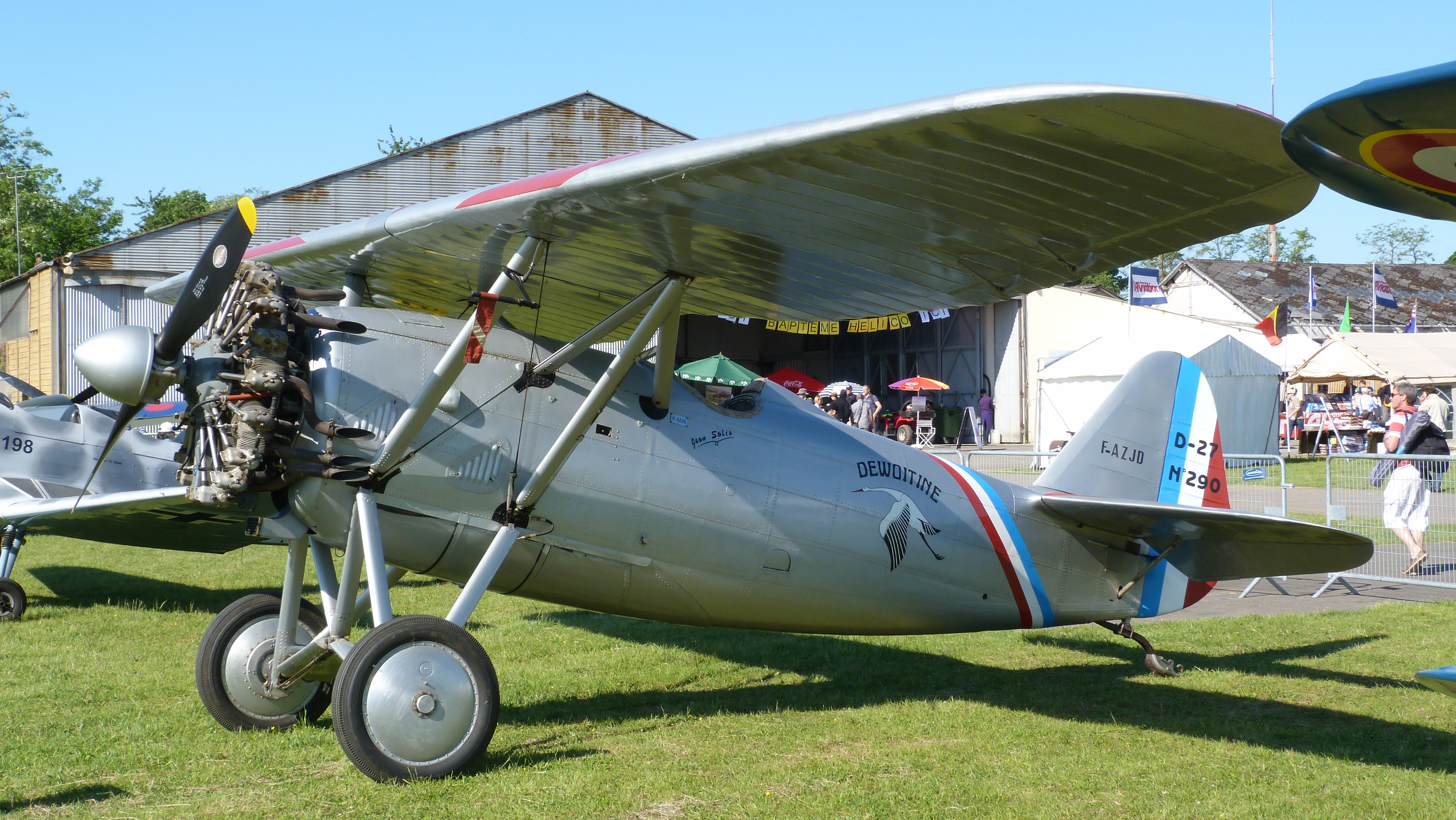
Dewoitine D-27

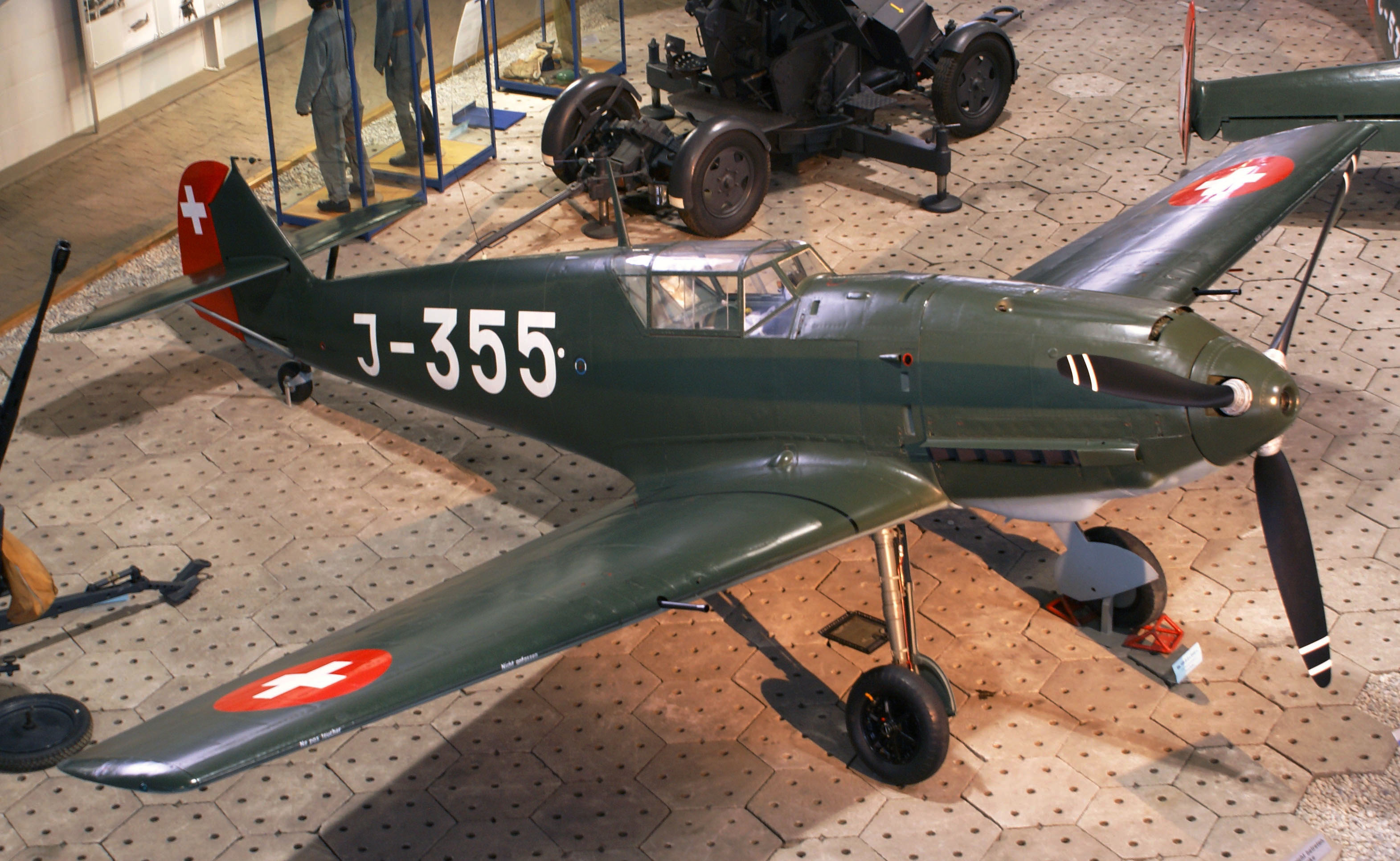
Messerschmitt Bf 109

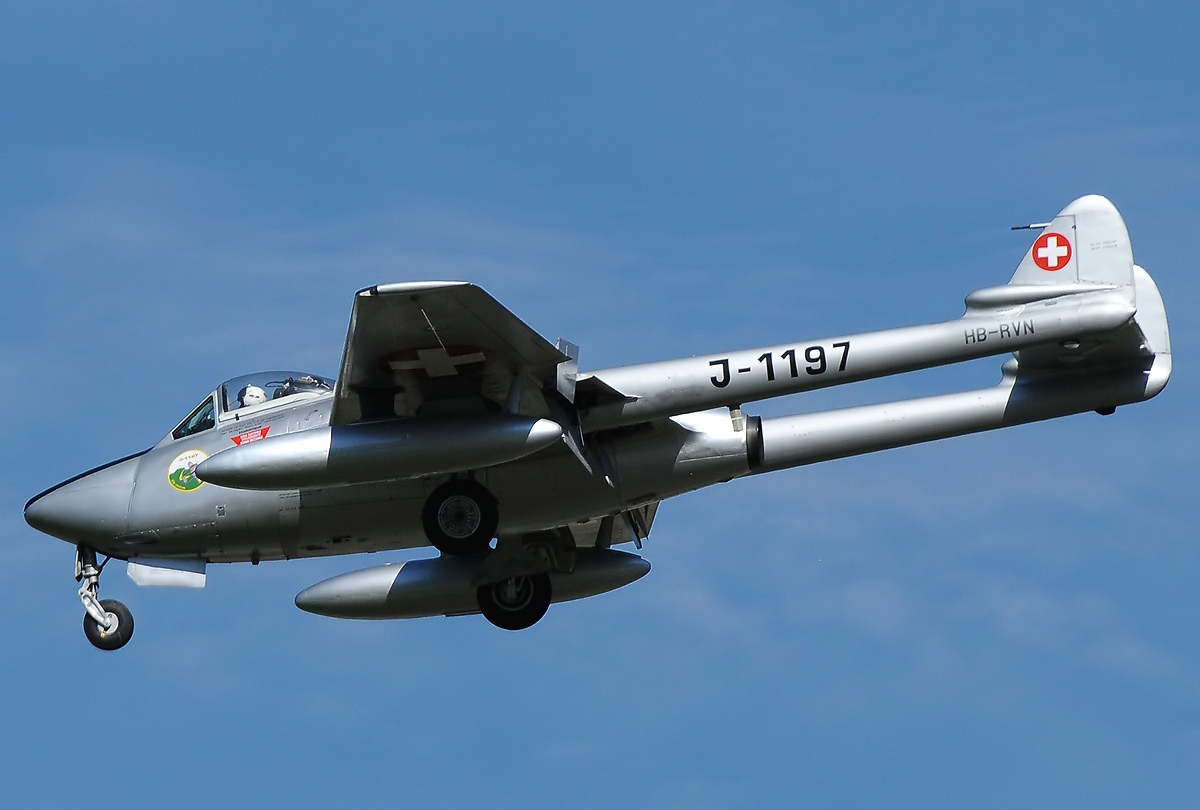
de Havilland Vampire

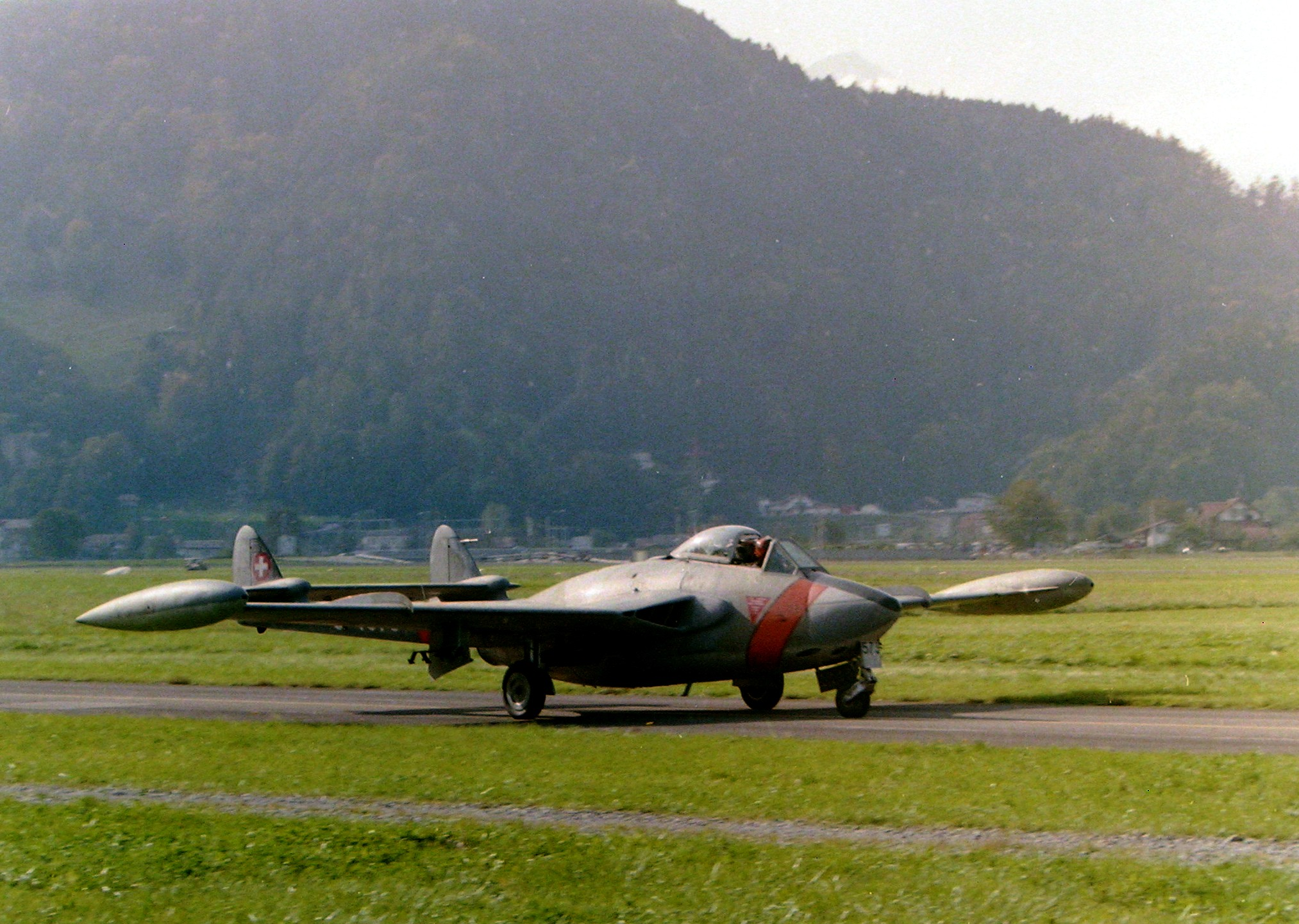
de Havilland Venom

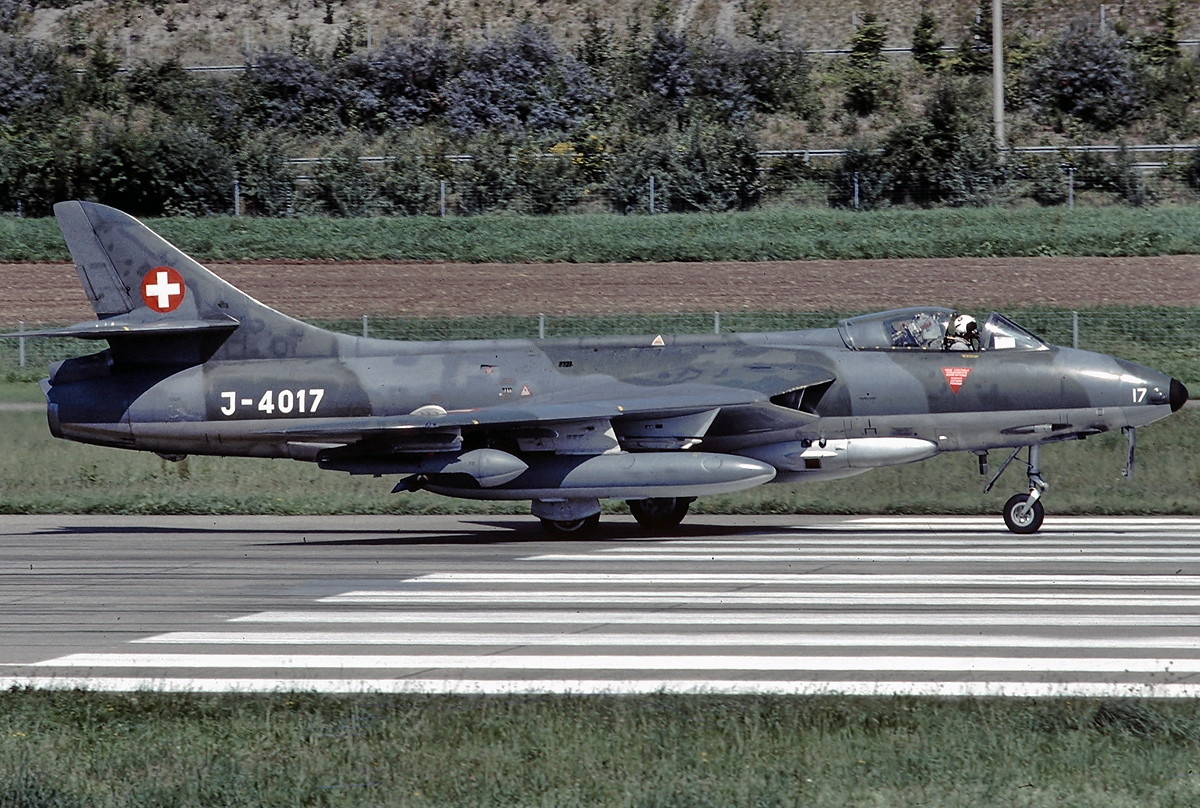
Hawker Hunter
