= Fliegerstaffel 7 =

Fliegerstaffel 7 7ème Escadrille Squadriglia d'aviazione 7
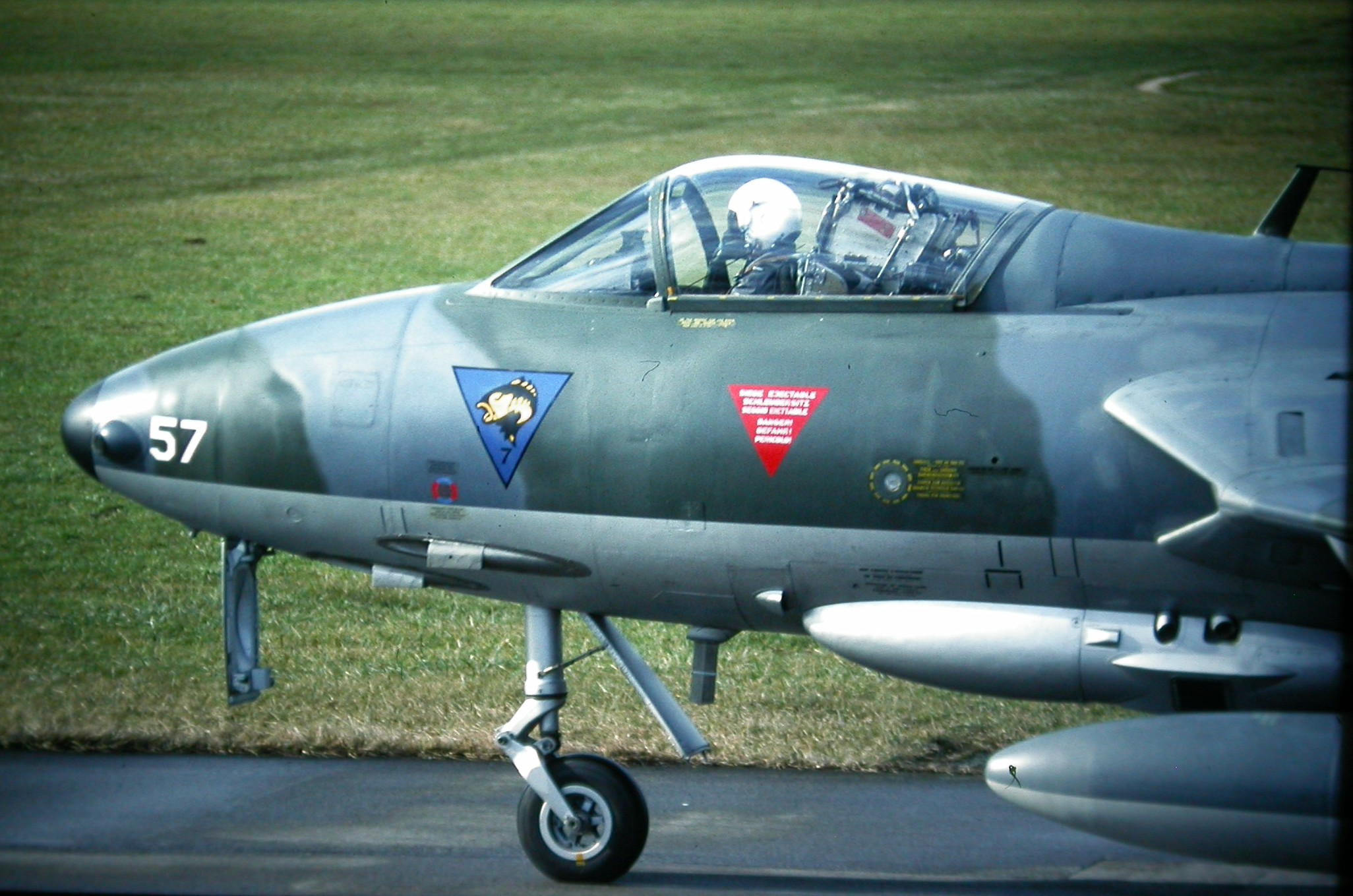
- A Hawker Hunter rolls to the start; A machine with an emblem of Fliegerstaffel 7
- Active: 1925–1994
- Country: Switzerland
- Branch: Swiss Air Force
- Role: Fighter squadron
- Garrison/HQ: Interlaken Airbase

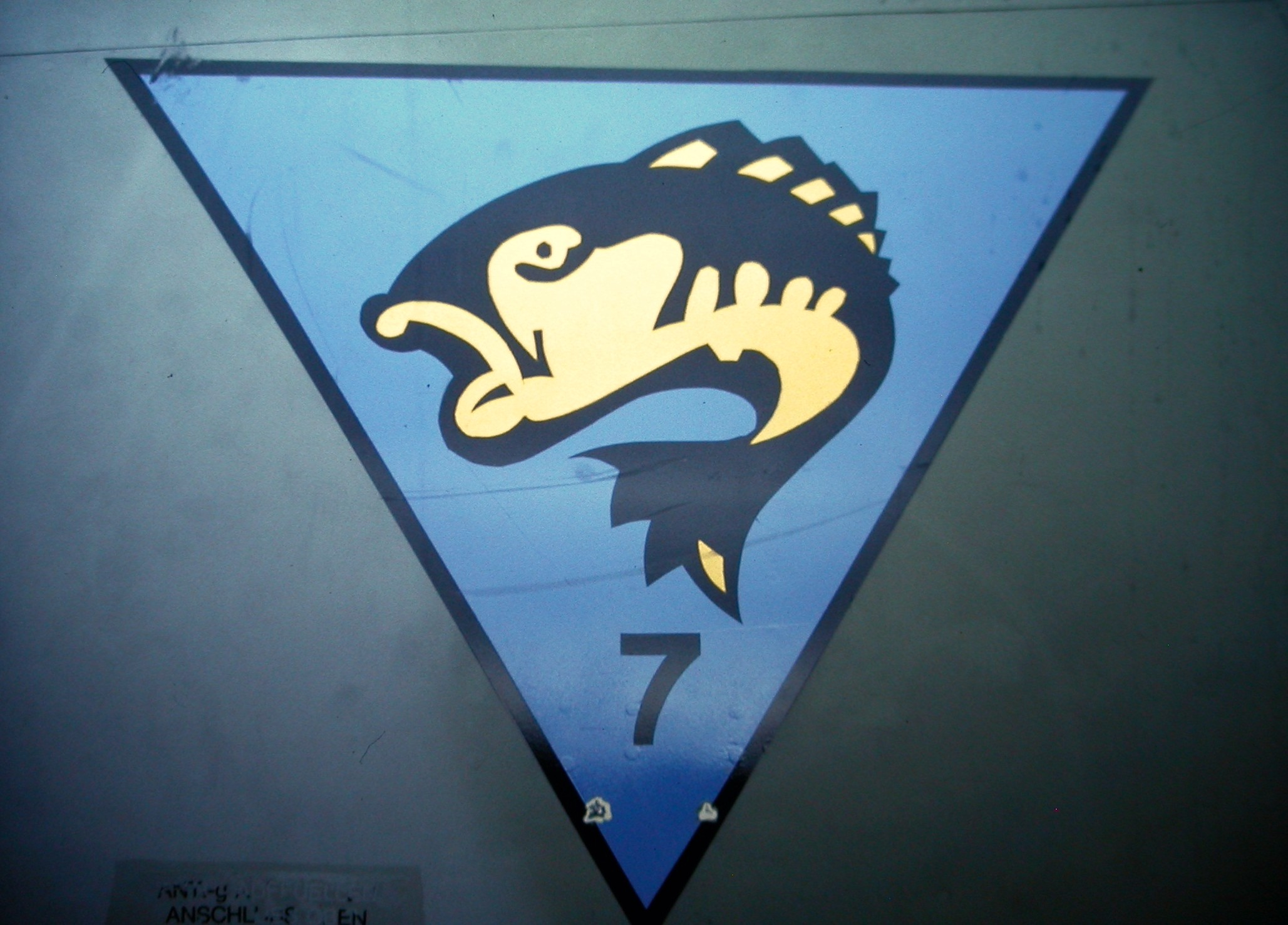
Emblem of the Fliegerstaffel 7 on a Hawker Hunter

Fliegerstaffel 7 was a Swiss Air Force squadron equipped with Hawker Hunter aircraft until 1994. Their home base at the time was the Meiringen Air Base. As a coat of arms, Fliegerstaffel 7 carried a jumping yellow Trout named "Jaqueline" on a dark blue background. The badge itself was an isosceles triangle with a black border that stood on top.

== History ==
In 1925, the unit was founded as 'Fliegerkompanie 7' . The aircraft types Fokker CV and Potez were first used in 1937. 1940 were they replaced by the new Messerschmitt Bf 109, which remained in use until 1947, whereby in 1945 the pilots of the Fliegerkompanie were regrouped into their own unit, Fliegerstaffel 7. From 1951 to 1973 the Fliegerstaffel 7 used jet aircraft De Havilland D.H. 100 Vampire along with De Havilland D.H. 112 Venom, which were in use from 1963 to 1974. From 1975 to 1983, Fliegerstaffel 7 was equipped with Hawker Hunters at Meiringen. From 1984 to 1991, the squadron had its homebase at Interlaken Airport. On the occasion of 14 years (2 times 7) of Hawker Hunter at the Fliegerstaffel 7 and 75 years of the Swiss Air Force in 1989, the aircraft J-4007 received the a blue and yellow special paint scheme. The aircraft was mostly blue, with yellow wing roots and air inlets and a part at the stern leading to the engine exhaust, which gave the hunters' aerodynamic shape a good effect. Also the auxiliary tanks under the wings received a blue top. Their ground forces unit was Fliegerkompanie 9, whose emblem it carried on the right front fuselage. In the years 1992 and 1993, the squadron operated in the Italian speaking part of Switzerland at their war-time homebase in Ambri-Piotta. In 1994, Fliegerstaffel 7 was back at its old home on the military airfield of Meiringen and by the end of the year, the Hawker Hunter was taken out of service and the Fligerstaffel 7 disbanded.

== Airplanes ==
- Fokker CV
- Potez 25
- Messerschmitt Bf 109
- de Havilland Vampire
- de Havilland Venom
- Hawker Hunter
