= Fliegerstaffel 15 =

Fliegerstaffel 15 15ème Escadrille Squadriglia d'aviazione 17
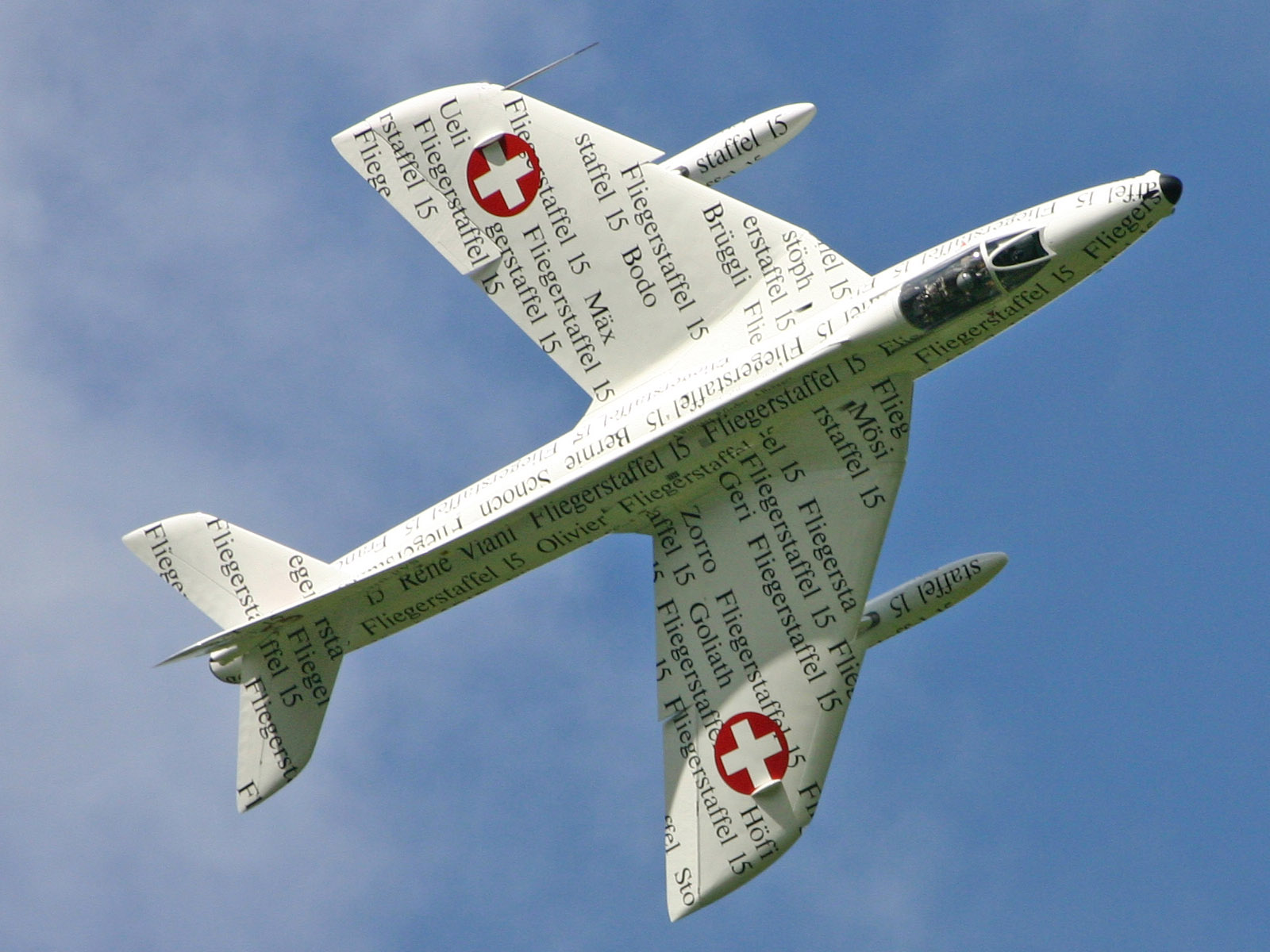
- Papyrus Hawker Hunter of Fl St 15
- Active: 1925–1994
- Country: Switzerland
- Branch: Swiss Air Force
- Role: Fighter squadron
- Garrison/HQ: airfield St. Stephan

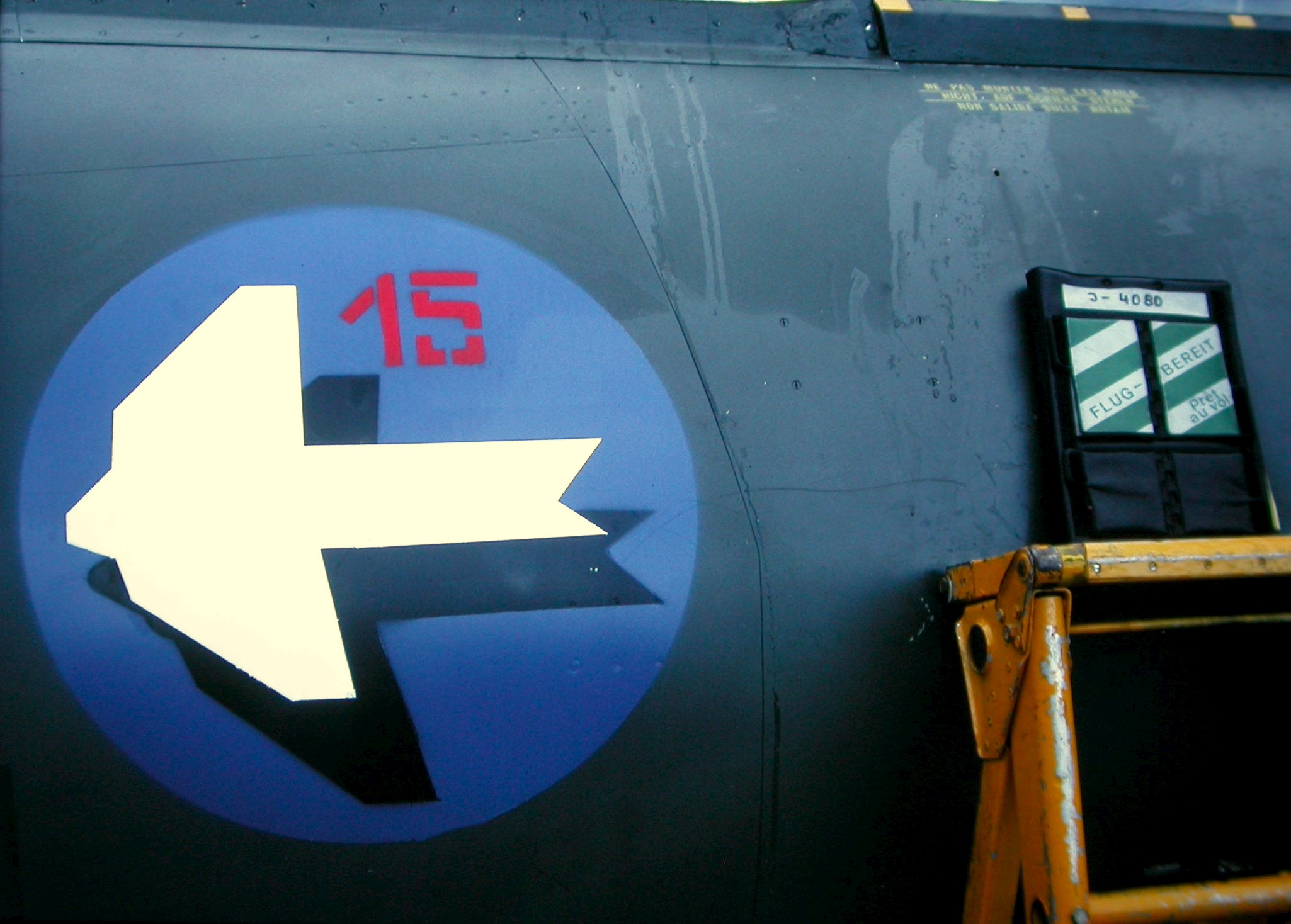
The Fliegerstaffel 15 Badge on the Hunter J-4080.

The late Fliegerstaffel 15 (No 5 Squadron) of the Swiss Air Force was active until 1994 and equipped with Hawker Hunter aircraft. The home base of their last service was the airfield at St. Stephan. The Fliegerstaffel 15 carried as their coat of arms a paper aircraft on a blue ground with a red "15". The old badge of the FlSt15 was a black bird of prey with white background and two red circles.

== History ==
In 1925 the "Fliegerkompanie 15" was founded, which was equipped with Dewoitine D-27 until 1939. After that the unit used the Messerschmitt Bf 109D from 1939 to 1941 at its homebasePayerne Air Base . Using the same type of aircraft as well as its version E, the Fliegerstaffel 15 continued operating from 1941 to 1947 from Biel-Bözingen. In 1945, during a reorganization, only the Flying Staff of the Fliegerkompanie 15 was transferred to the newly created Fliegerstaffel 15, and from 1952 onwards, the crew flew the Morane D-3801 from St. Stephan military airfield. Only three years later, the change to the jet aircraft De Havilland D.H. 100 vampires and the very same year to De Havilland D.H. 112 Venom was done. From 1980 to 1994 the Fliegerstaffel 15 continued to use the Hawker Hunter from St. Stephan. In 1994, the Hawker Hunter was withdrawn from service. The military airfield St. Stephan was handed over to civilian users, and the Fliegerstaffel 15 was disbanded.

In the autumn of 1994 the Hawker Hunter J-4040 received a special painting for the farewell. The all white aircraft wore the names of the pilots as well as texts Fliegerstaffel 15 in newspaper style, in reference to the symbol of the paper aircraft. The underwing tanks also received this coating. The registration was changed from J-4040 to J-4015 (because of the Fliegerstaffel “15”), although the Luftwaffe operated another Hunter with the registration J-4015 at the same time. The Hunter with the original registration J-4015 was decorated in September 1994 as Graffity Hunter by the Fliegerstaffel 20. The 15 Squadron aircraft was named Papyrus-Hunter. Originally, the "Papyrus Hunter" was to be placed on a pedestal at the entrance to the St. Stephan airfield, but the Hunterverein Obersimmenthal managed to keep the aircraft airworthy to this day with the civilian Aircraft registrationHB -RVS and performing displays airshows.

== Airplanes ==
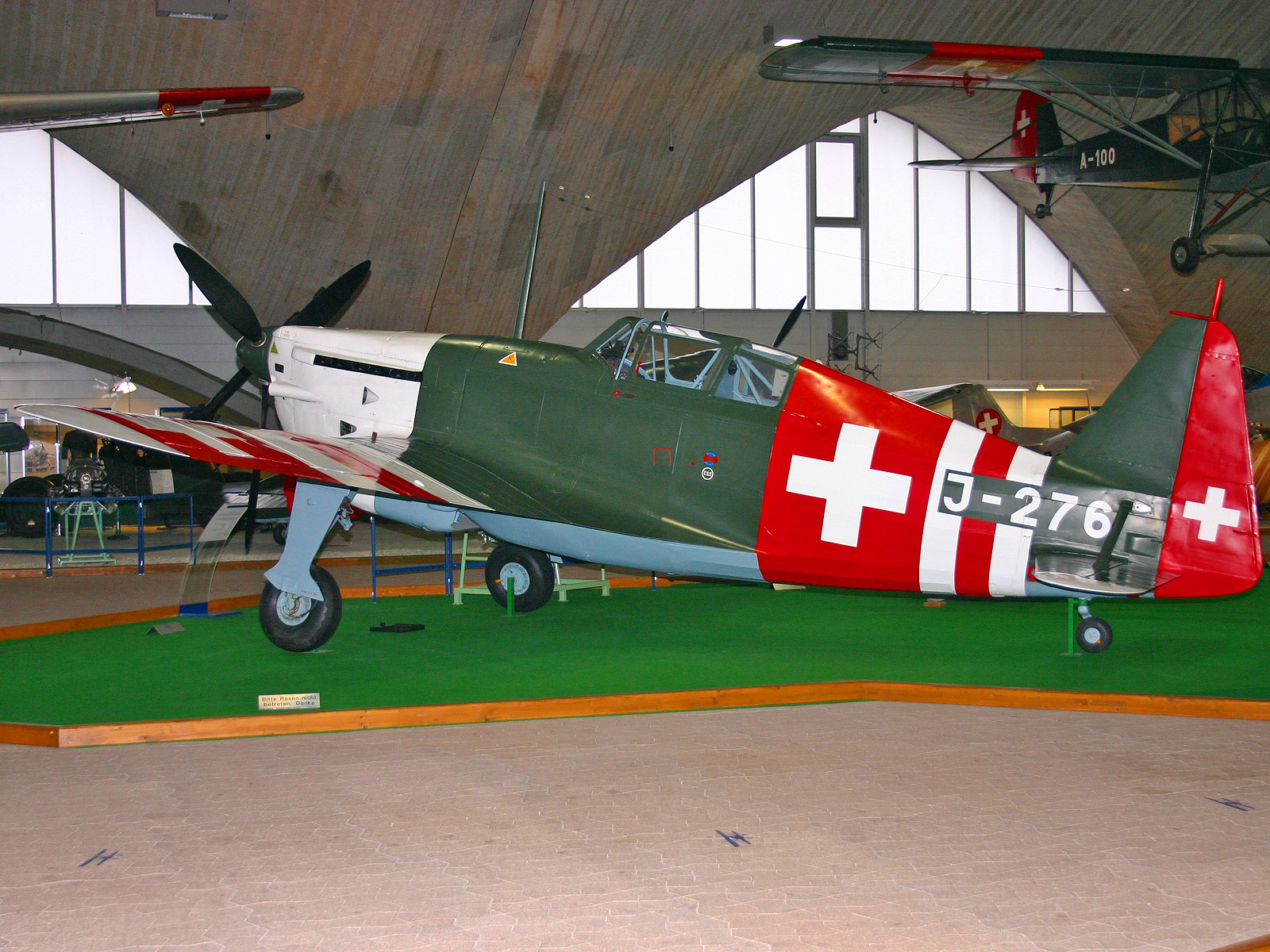
Morane D-3800

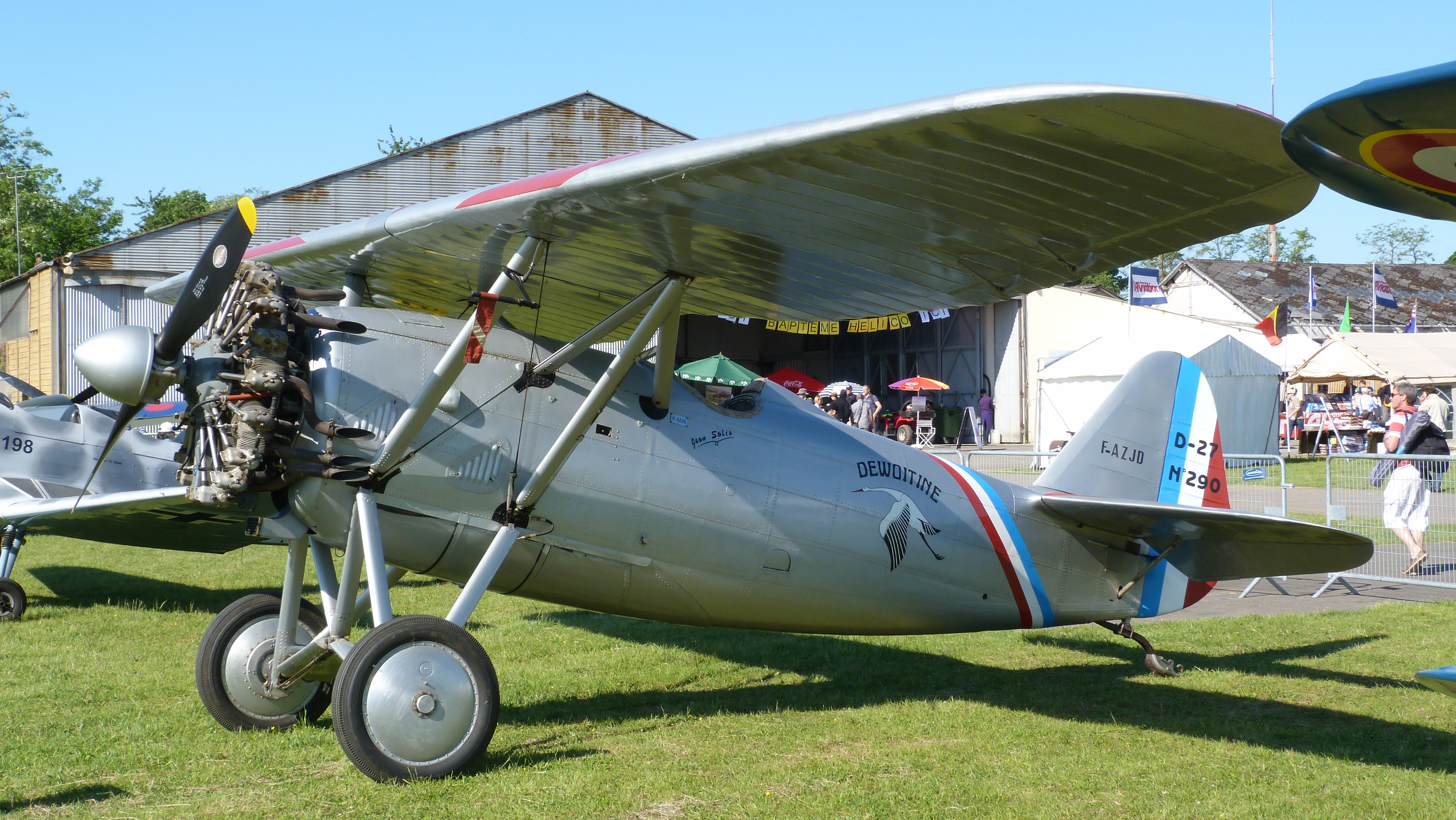
Dewoitine D-27

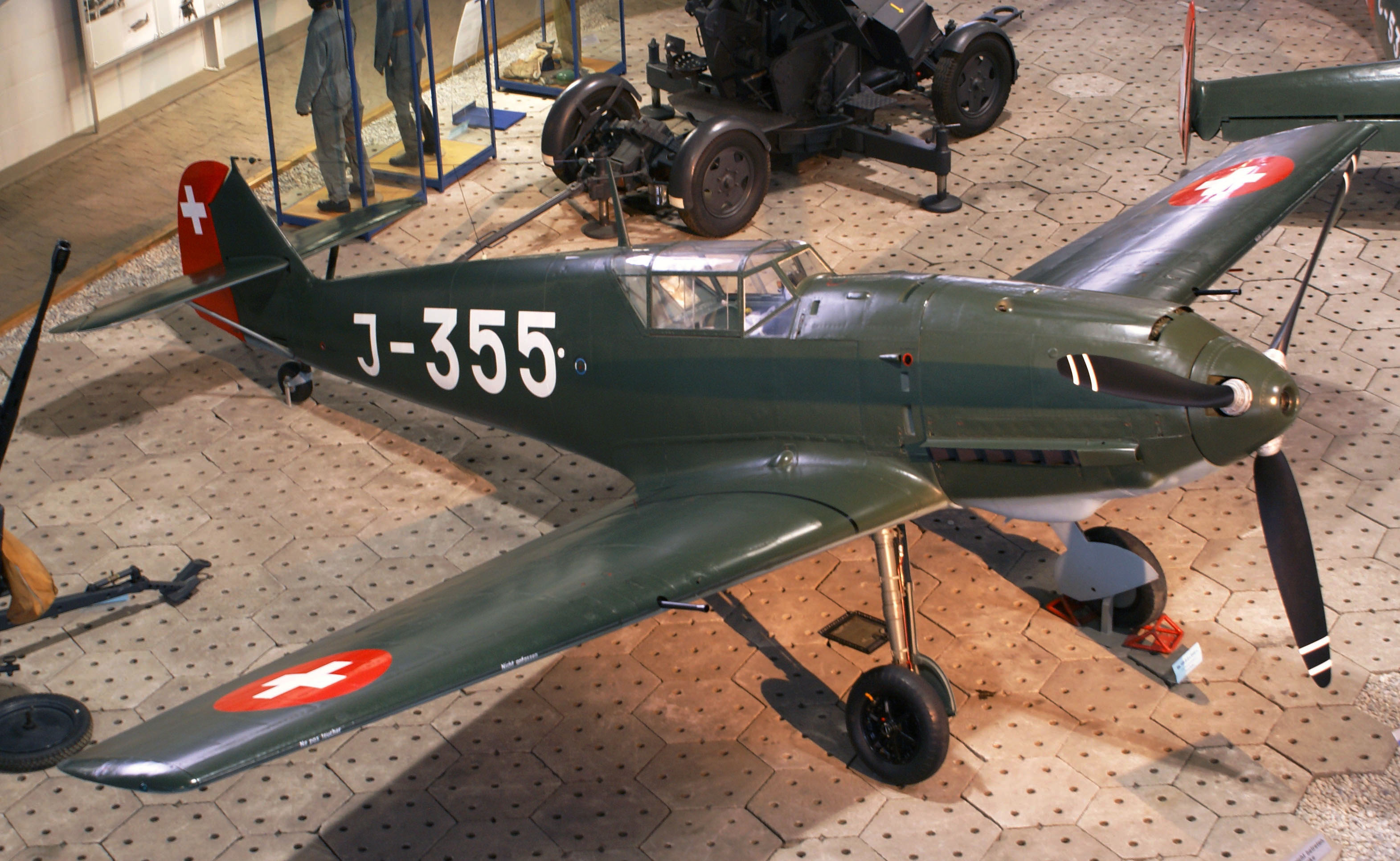
Messerschmitt Bf 109

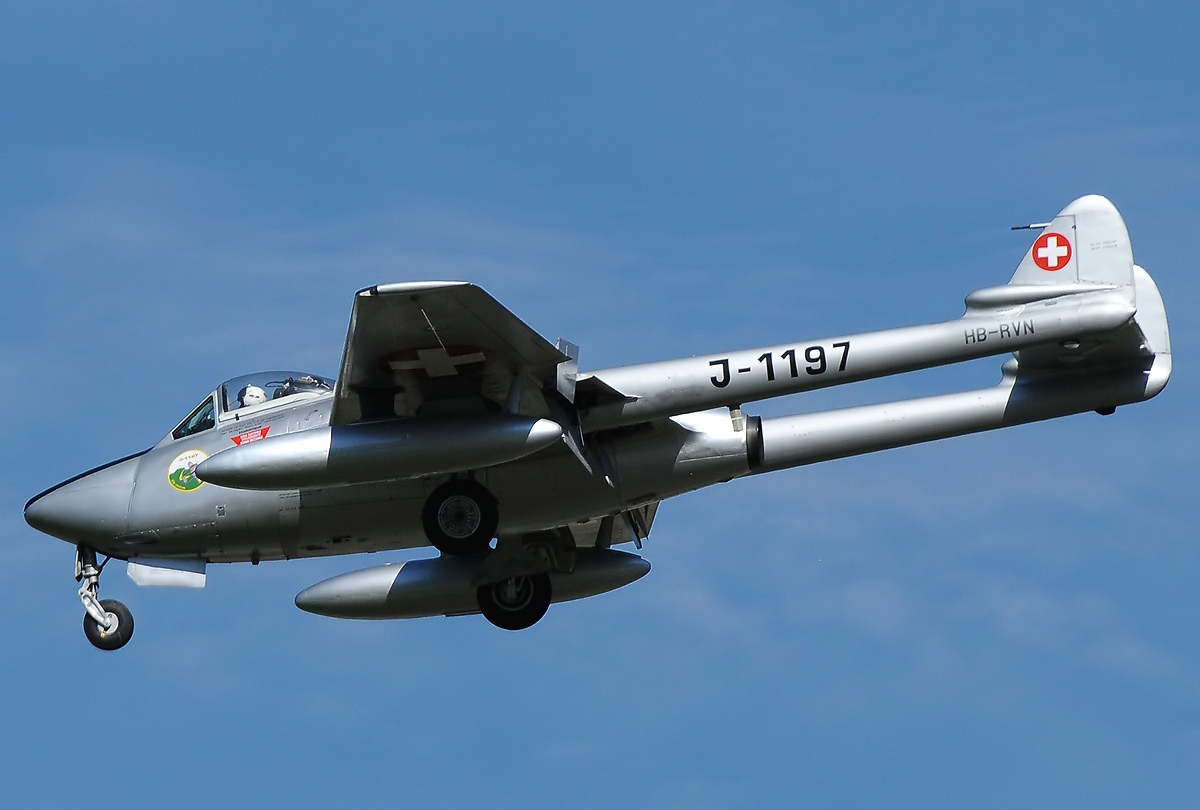
de Havilland Vampire

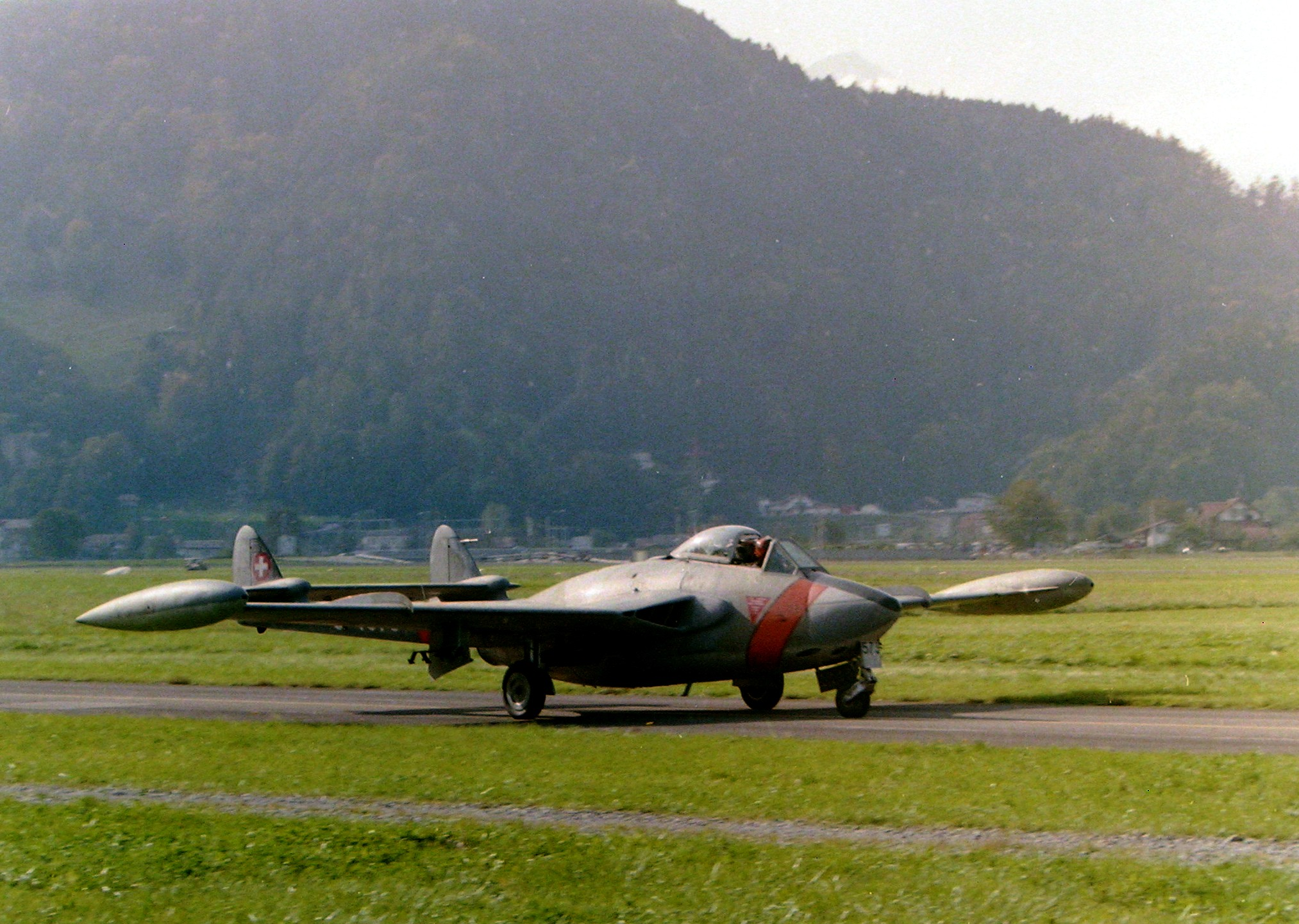
de Havilland Venom

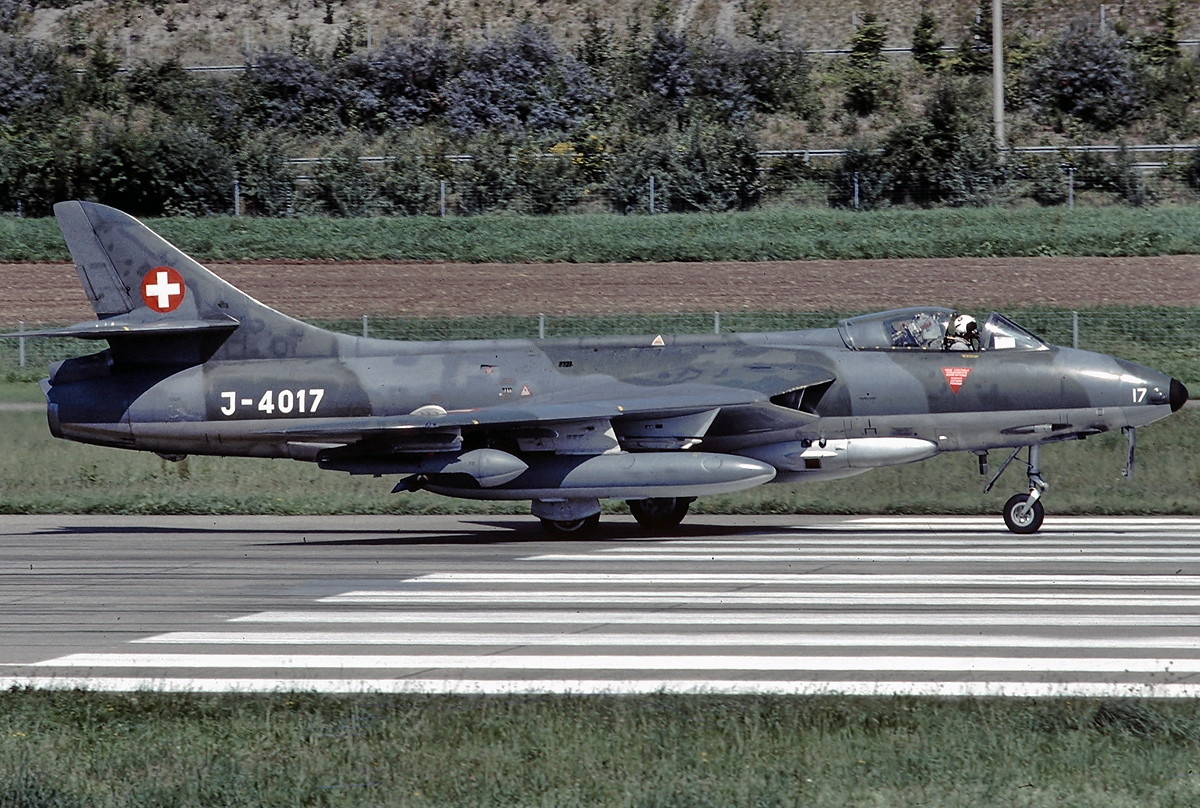
Hawker Hunter

== Trivia ==
Fliegerstaffel 15 had a blue Citroën 2CV which carried the coat of armsof the Fliegerstaffel 15 on both sides.
