= Fliegerstaffel 9 =

Swiss Air Force unit

Fliegerstaffel 9 9ème Escadrille Squadriglia d'aviazione 9
- Active: 1925-1994
- Country: Switzerland
- Branch: Swiss Air Force
- Role: air to ground training squadron
- Garrison/HQ: Sion Airport

The Fliegerstaffel 9 of the Swiss Air Force was in its end equipped with de Havilland Venom Combat Aircraft. Their home base at the dissolution was the Sion Airport. The Fliegerstaffel 9 carried as coat of arms the side view of a red witch riding on a red broom. On a rectangular dark blue background. The witch and the broom were drawn without curves (apart from the black / white eye of the witch). Beneath the witch stands a flight of fliers with white writing. In the upper right corner is a white square 9.

== History ==
The Fliegerkompanie 9 was founded in 1925 and equipped with Fokker CV until 1936. These were replaced by the Dewoitine D-27, which were in service with this unit until 1940. 1940 followed the Messerschmitt Bf 109 and Morane D-3801. In 1945, the flying staff was assigned to the 9th Airborne Squadron. The propeller planes were delivered at the Fliegerstaffel 9 from 1947 onwards. From 1950, the squadron was equipped with the jet aircraft De Havilland D.H. 100 Vampires. De Havilland D.H. 100 Vampires was replaced in 1967 by De Havilland D.H. 112 Venoms. The Fliegerstaffel 9 flew the DH-112 Venom until its deactivation in November 1982. Their task consisted from the 70-years in the ground combat training of young pilots, before they passed to the Hunter frontstaffel. Formally, the Fliegerstaffel 9 was disestablished in 1994.

== Airplanes ==
- Fokker CV
- Dewoitine D.27
- Morane D-3801
- Messerschmitt Bf 109
- de Havilland Vampire
- de Havilland Venom
