= Fliegerstaffel 2 =

Fliegerstaffel 2 2ème Escadrille Squadriglia d'aviazione 2
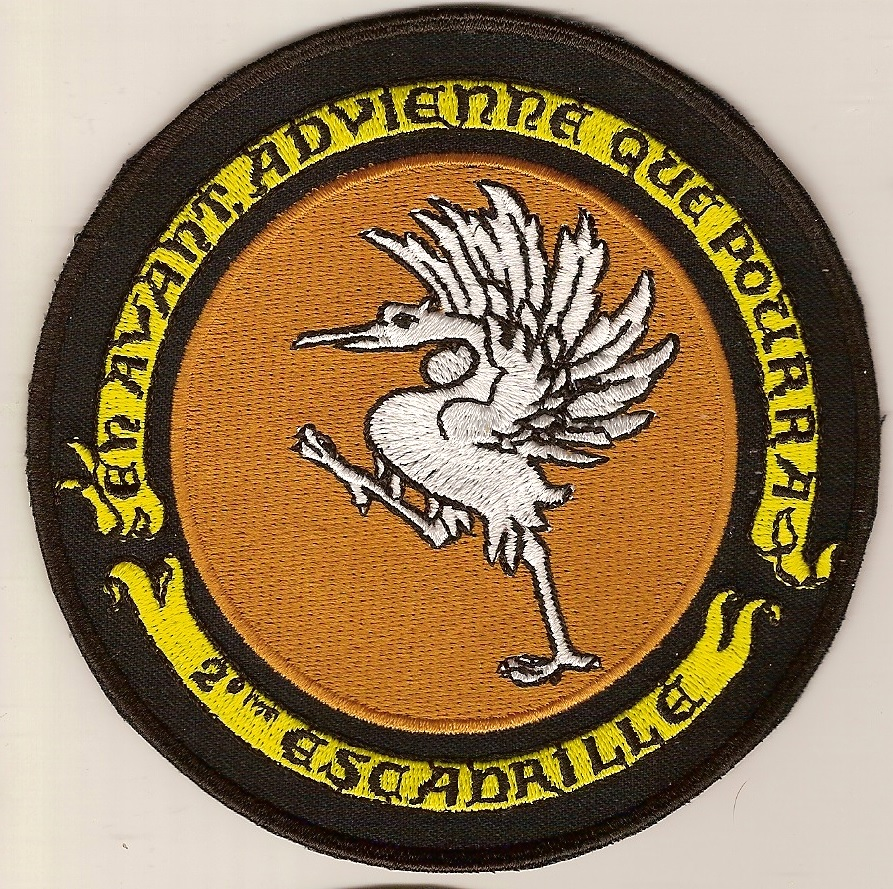
- old badge design of Fliegerstaffel 2
- Active: 1925–1994
- Country: Switzerland
- Branch: Swiss Air Force
- Role: Fighter squadron
- Garrison/HQ: military airfield of Turtmann

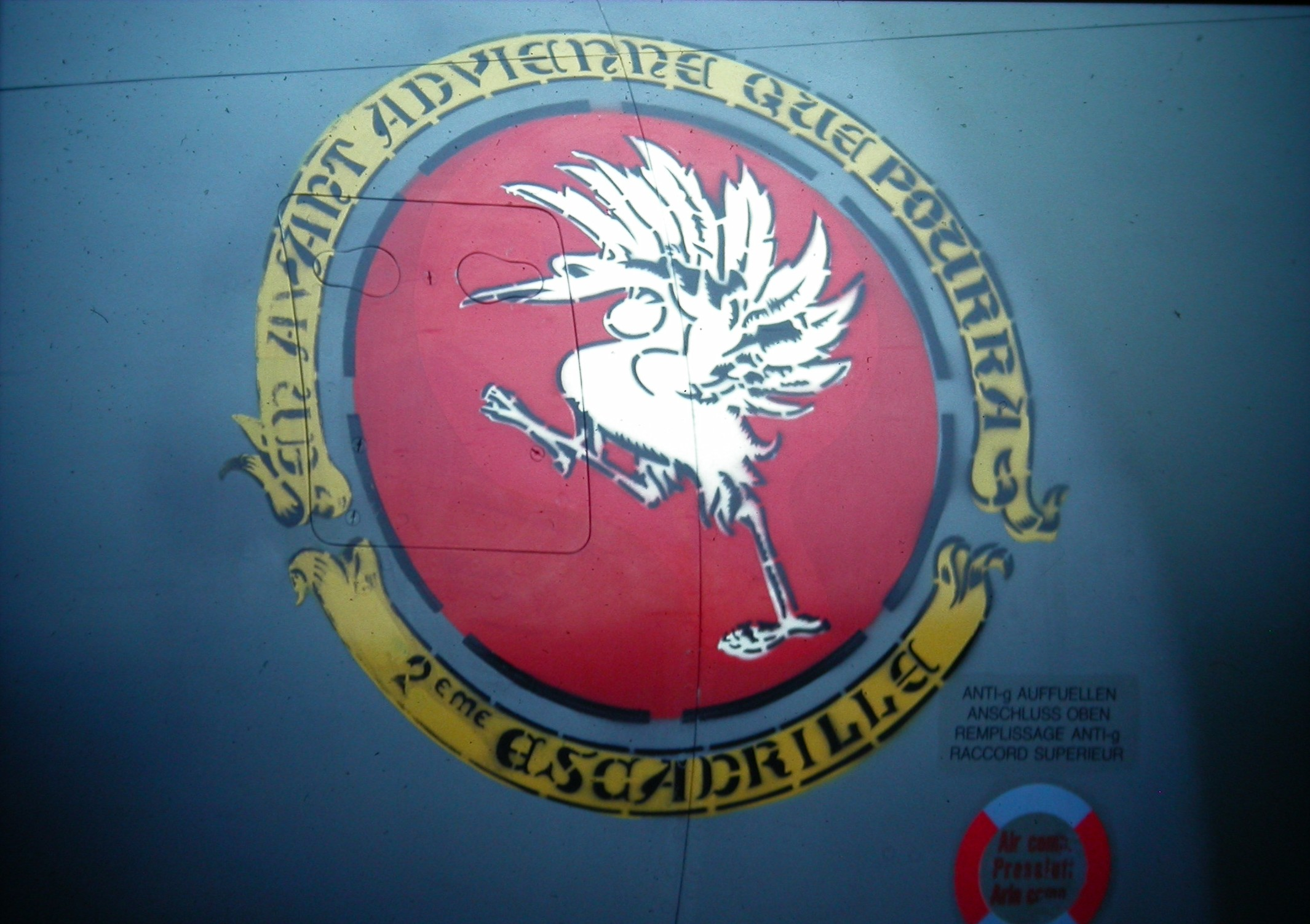
new badge design

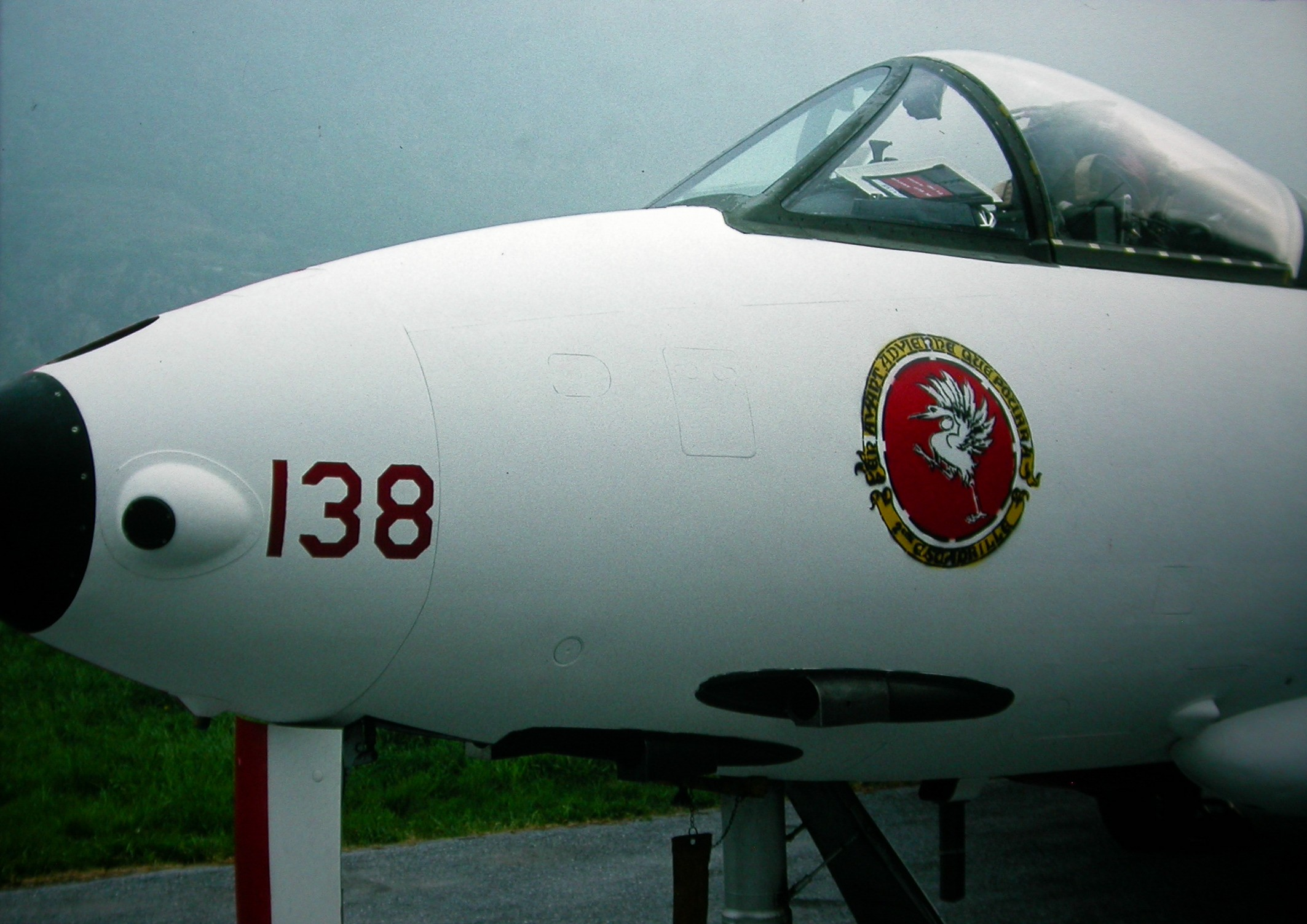
Old Badge on a Hawker Hunter

Fliegerstaffel 2 (No. 2 Squadron) was using Hawker Hunter aircraft for the Swiss Air Force at the time of disbandment. Its pilots origined from French-speaking Switzerland and its home was the military airfield of Turtmann then. As a coat of arms, Fliegerstaffel 2 used a white bird taken from the one of Gruyère District on a red background surrounded by a motto saying "En Avant, Advienne Que Pourra". 2ème Escadrille.

== History ==
The squadrons predecessor was founded in 1925 under the designation Fliegerkompanie 2 with the airplane type Fokker C.V. In 1942 the squadron received the C-3603. In 1945, during a reorganization, the Flying Staff of the Fliegerkompanie 2 was transferred to the newly created Fliegerstaffel 2, using Morane D-3801 until 1949. The squadron badge was changed to a copper background, the outside area was black instead of white and the font was depicted on a yellow ribbon. From 1949 to 1951, Fliegerstaffel 2 used its first jet aircraft, the De Havilland D.H. 100 Vampire. In 1955 it flew the De Havilland D.H. 112 Venom and was based at the Military Airfield of Ulrichen until 1982. In 1983, still on the military airfield of Ulrichen, Fliegerstaffel 2 took over the Hawker Hunter. The Fliegerstaffel 2 operated the Hunter up to its end. During this time, the Fliegerstaffel 2 relocated its flight operations to the (Hardened aircraft shelter) U-20 on the Payerne Air Base. In 1992 the military airfield Turtmann, where aircraft operations took place out of an Aircraft cavern, became a short time new home base of the Fliegerstaffel 2. The Fliegerstaffel 2 was disbanded 1994 with the withdrawal of the Hawker Hunter in the Swiss Air Force. During the last service in 1993 a Hawker Hunter with the registration J-4138 was marked with white color on the left side and on the right side with red color as reference to the Canton of Valais. Since the color was not water resistant, the aircraft was not allowed to fly at that time.

== Airplanes ==
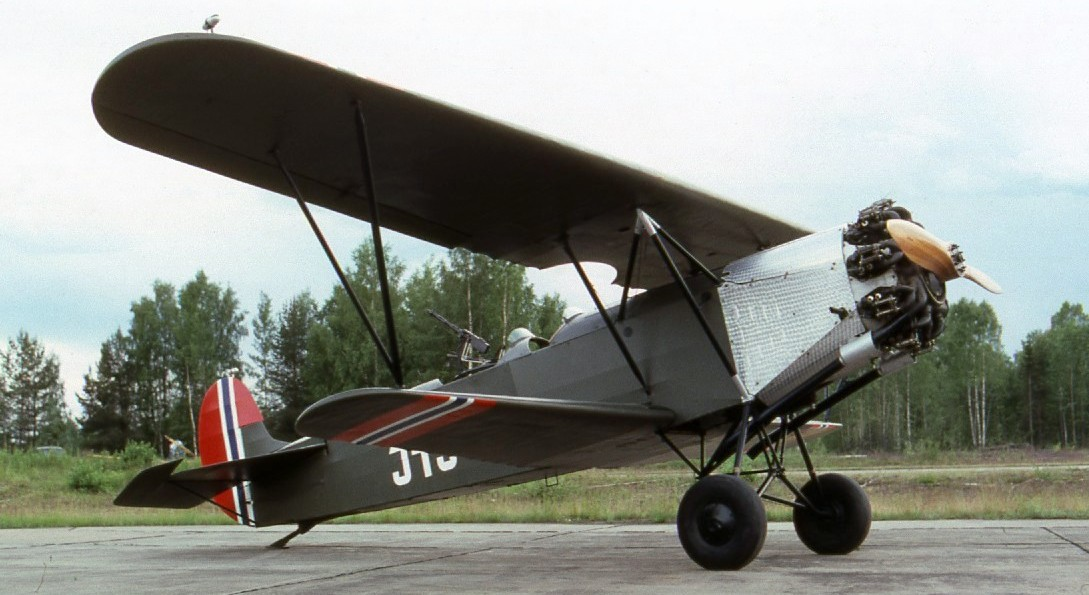
Fokker CV

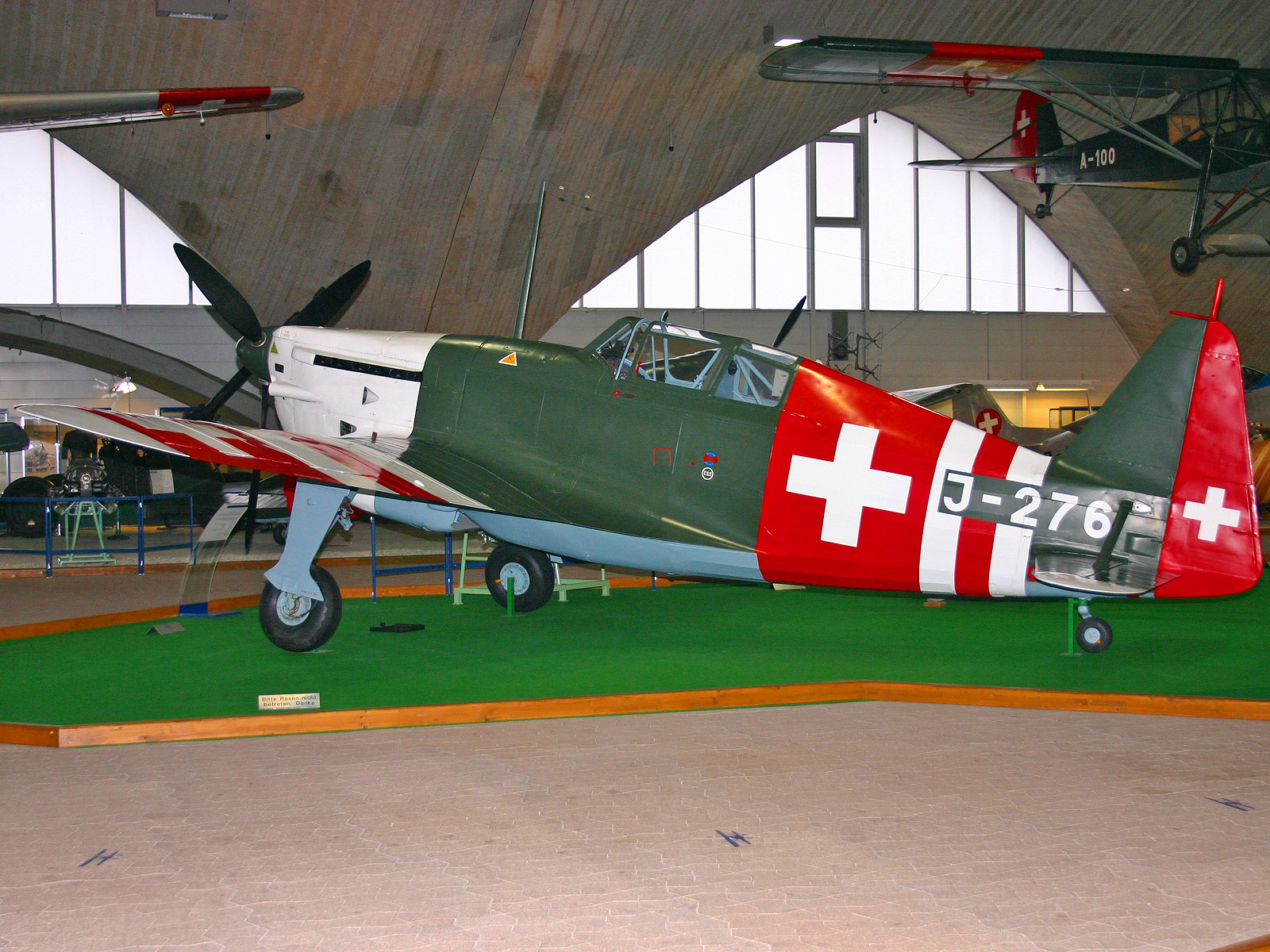
Morane D-3800

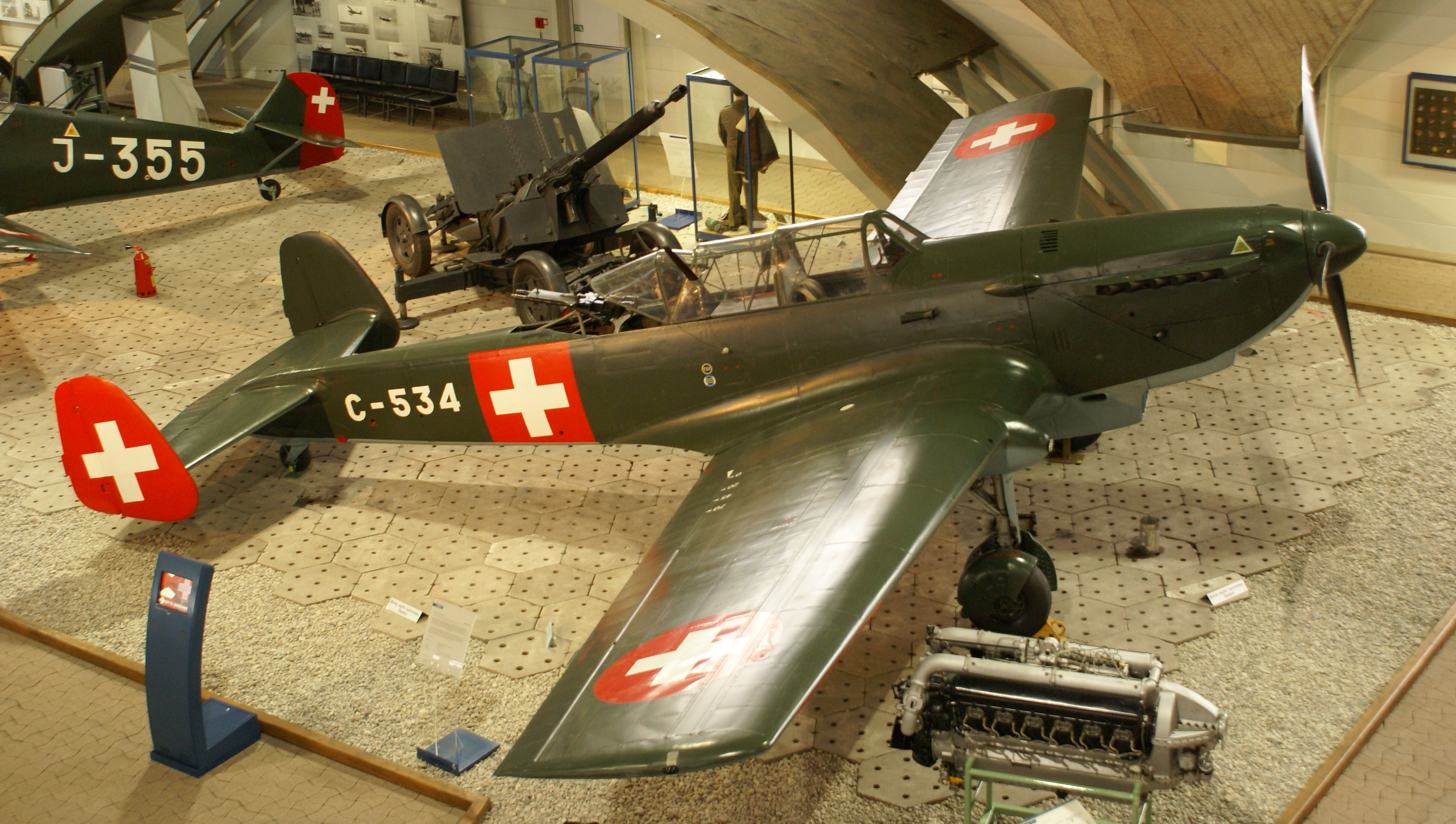
C-3603

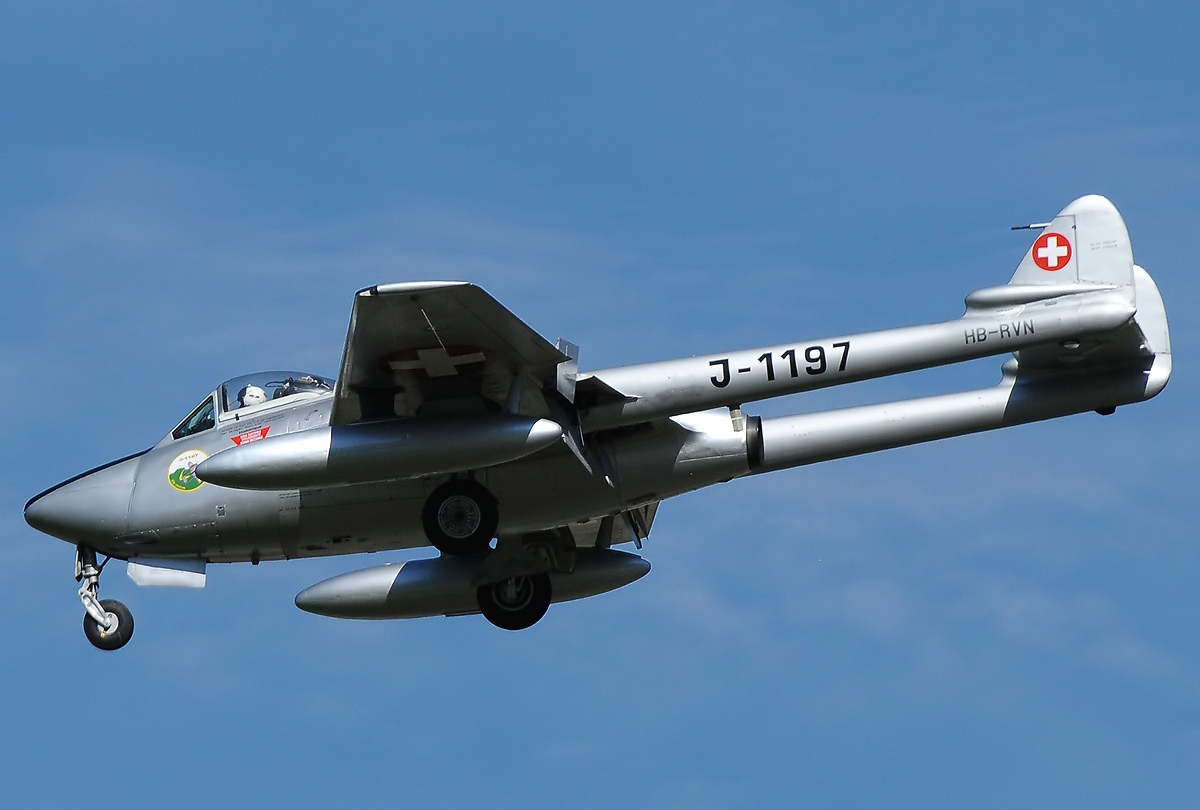
de Havilland Vampire

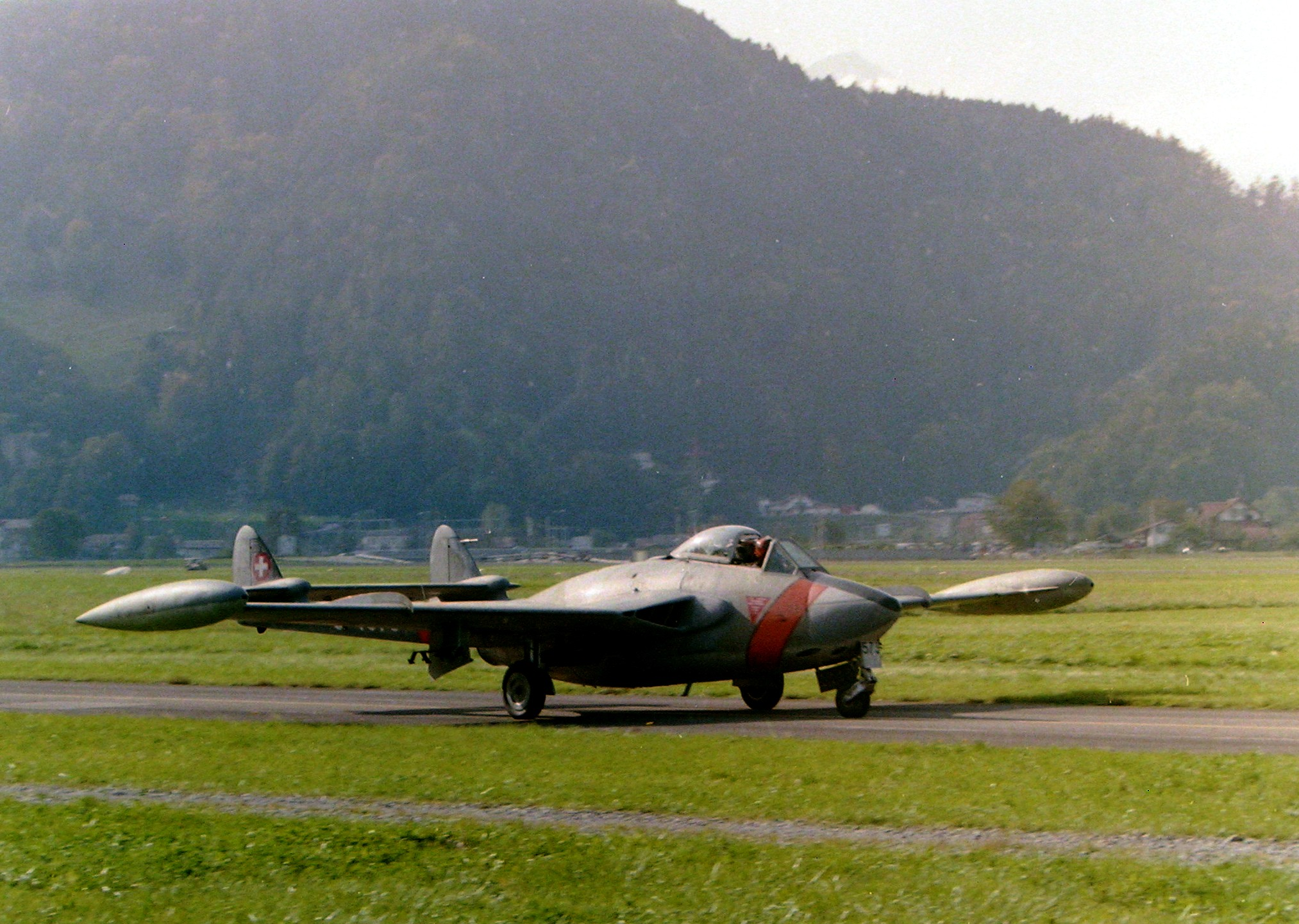
de Havilland Venom

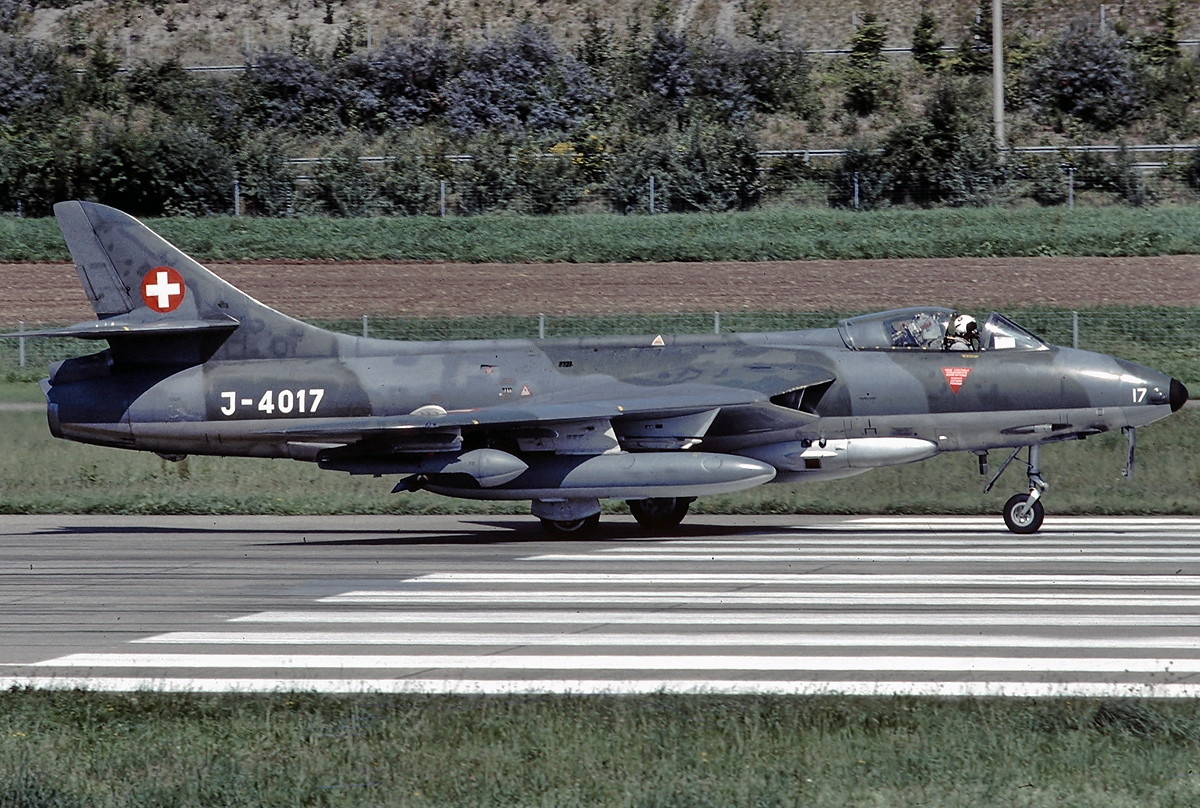
Hawker Hunter
