= Target tug =

Aircraft towing a drone for target practice

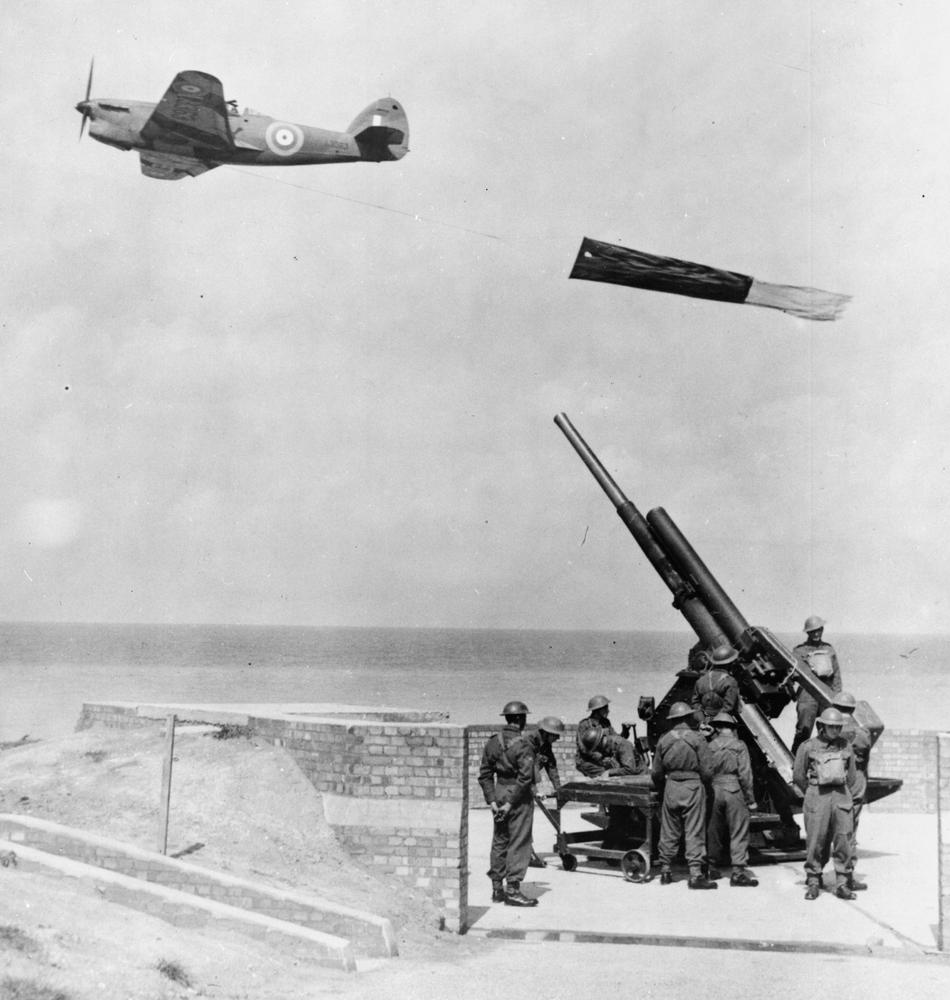
Poster for the British target tug Hawker Henley

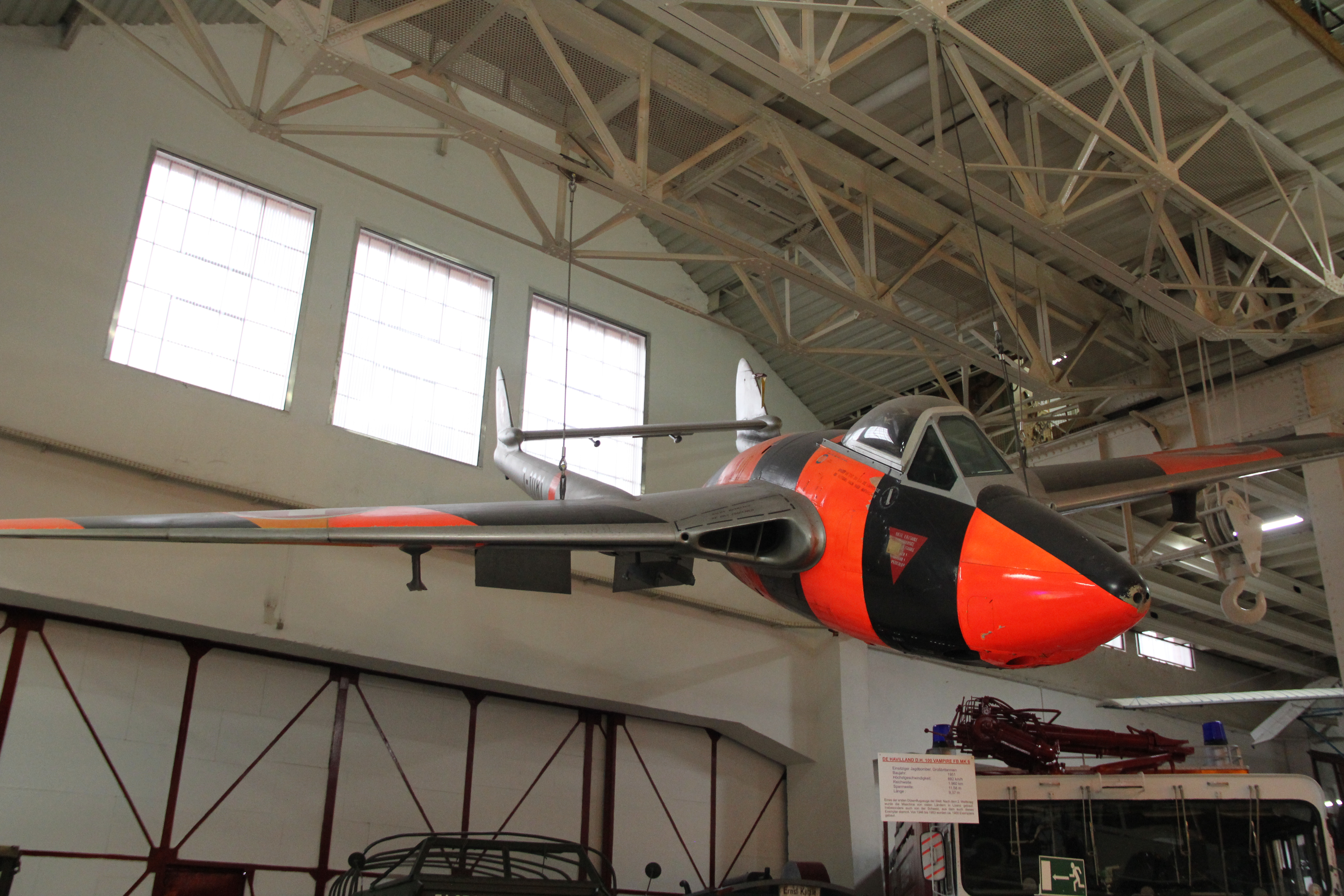
Swiss DH 100 Vampire target tug, painted in bright warning colors. It is common to paint target tugs in vibrant colors to differentiate them from the targets they tow

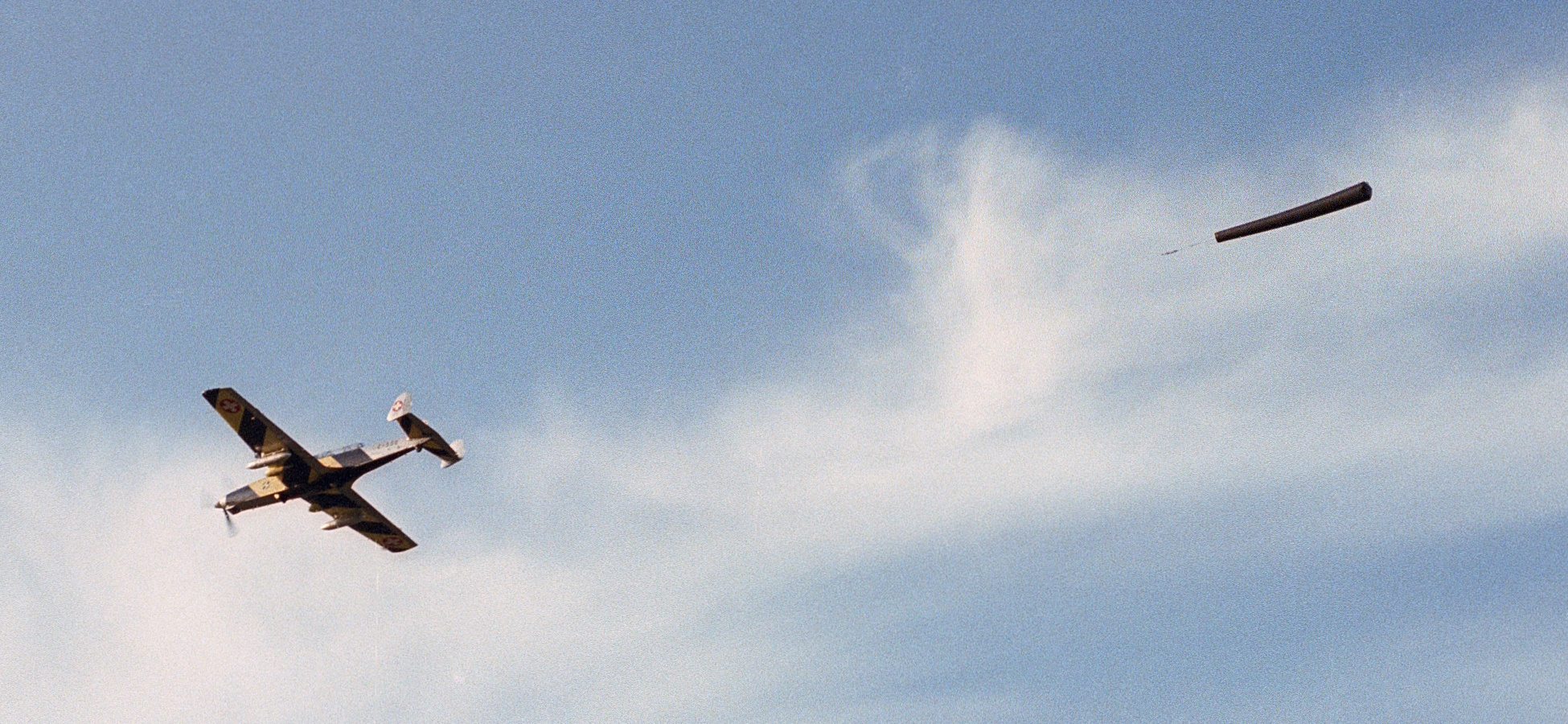
Swiss F+W C-3605 towing a target sleeve

A target tug, or target tower, is an aircraft which tows an unmanned drone, a fabric drogue or other kind of target, for the purposes of gun or missile target practice. Target tugs are often conversions of transport and utility aircraft, as well as obsolescent combat types. Some, such as the Miles Martinet, were specially designed for the role. Flying a target tug was, and is, a relatively hazardous job, as live fire is typically employed and the people doing the shooting are usually still in training.

== History ==
=== World War II ===
Prior to and during World War II target tugs were typically operated by the air arms on behalf of which they flew, and were usually conversions of aircraft that had failed in combat or that were otherwise unsuitable or obsolete in their design roles (see Fairey Battle and Short Sturgeon). These aircraft typically trailed a drogue fabric sleeve at the end of a several-thousand metre long cable. Student fighter pilots or air gunners would shoot at the target from other aircraft using painted bullets so that hits could be recorded and later analysed.

In the RAF, Miles Master IIs were used for this purpose as part of the Target Towing Flight at the Central Gunnery School whilst the School was based at RAF Sutton Bridge from April 1942 to March 1944. Other aircraft used in this role were the Hawker Henley, the Boulton Paul Defiant and the Westland Lysander, although the RAF was by no means the only air arm to use target tugs. They were used by most air forces. The USAAF used older aircraft such as the TBD Devastator as target tugs. The Luftwaffe and the VVS (Red Army) also used tugs.

The chief modifications to the aircraft were a station for the drogue operator and a winch to reel in the cable prior to landing. The winch was typically powered by a small wind turbine on the outside of the aircraft, driven by the airflow and attached to the winch via a clutch. Such devices are still used by some aerial refueling tankers to retract the refueling hose after the operation is completed. The drogue would often be jettisoned at some location convenient for recovery prior to the aircraft's landing. The drogue itself caused a great deal of drag and could be dangerous, particularly to less-powerful aircraft. If the engine failed, the drag from the drogue could be enough to reduce the airspeed of the aircraft below stall speed before the drogue could be jettisoned (see Hawker Henley).

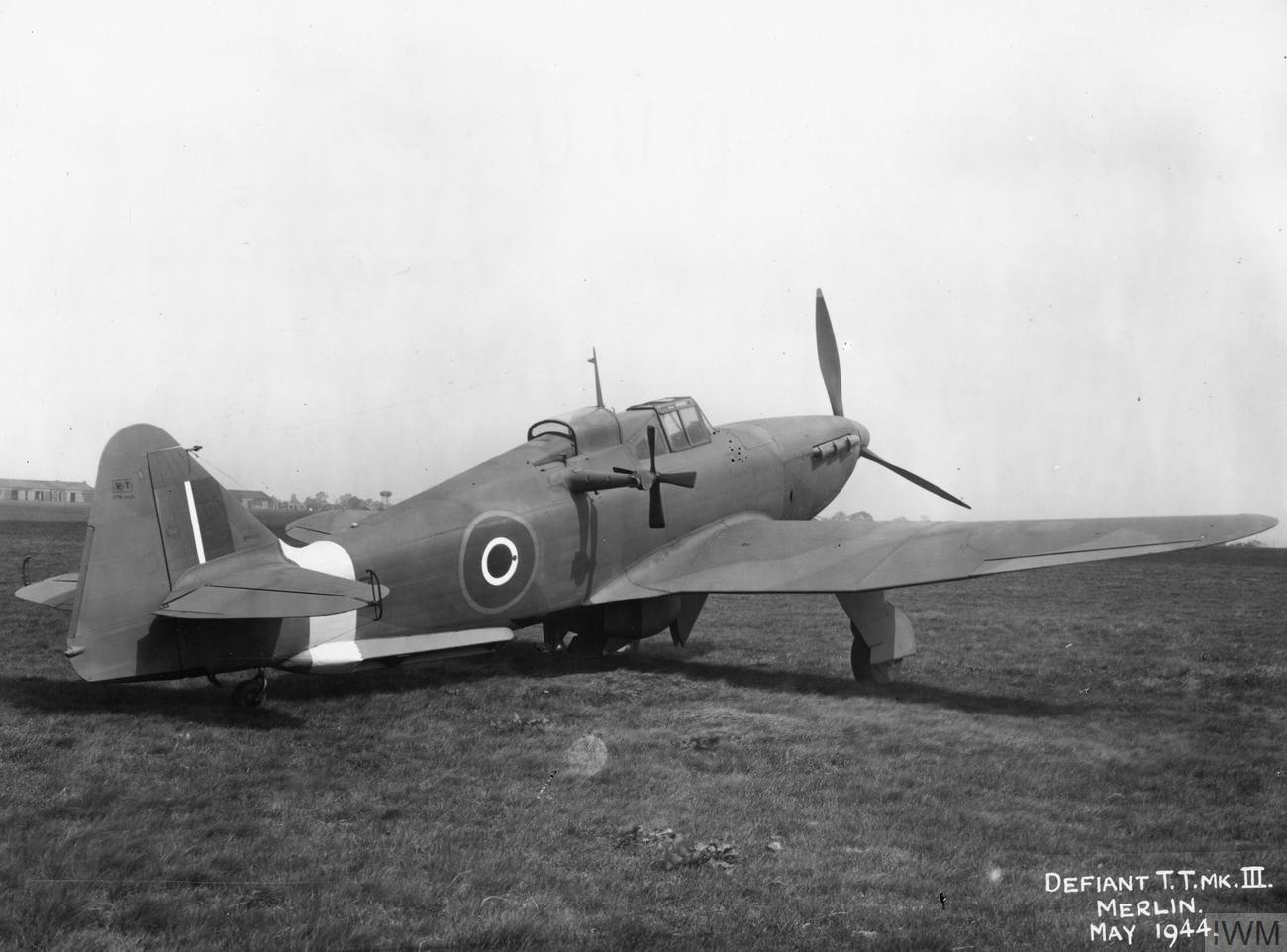
British Defiant TT Mk III target tug, May 1944, with a ram air turbine powered target winch

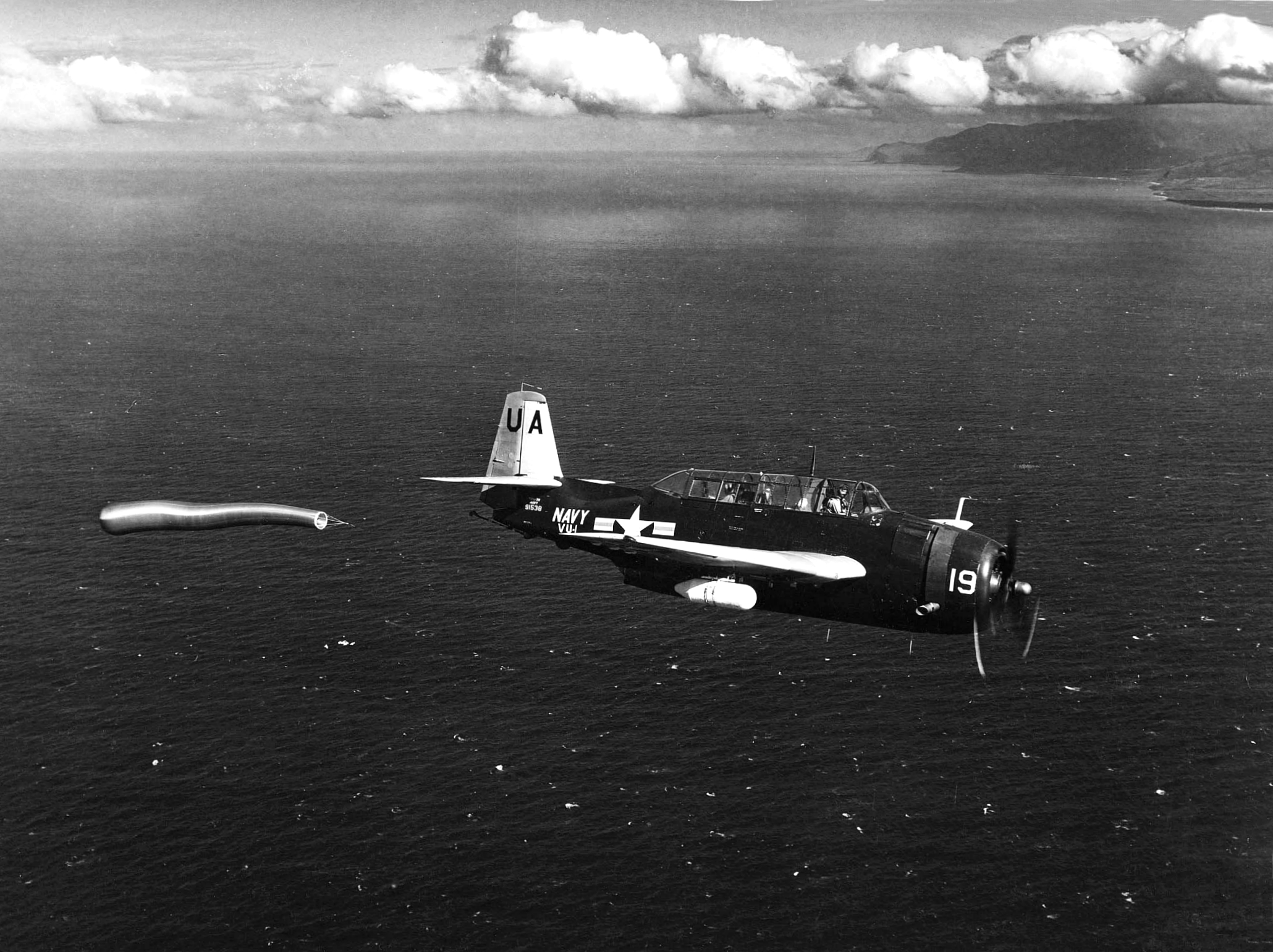
US TBM-3U Avenger towing a target sleeve

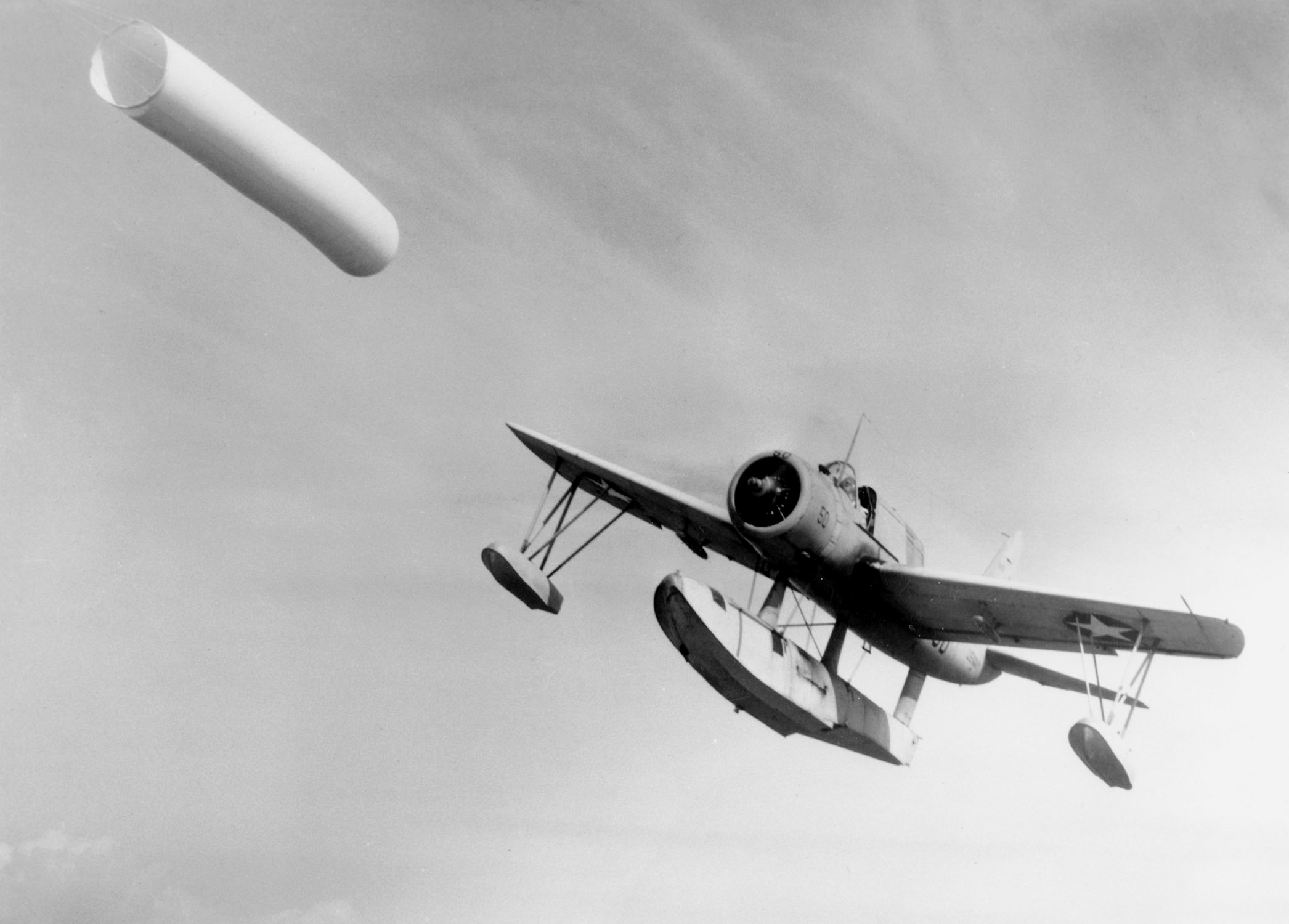
US OS2U Kingfisher following a towed target sleeve

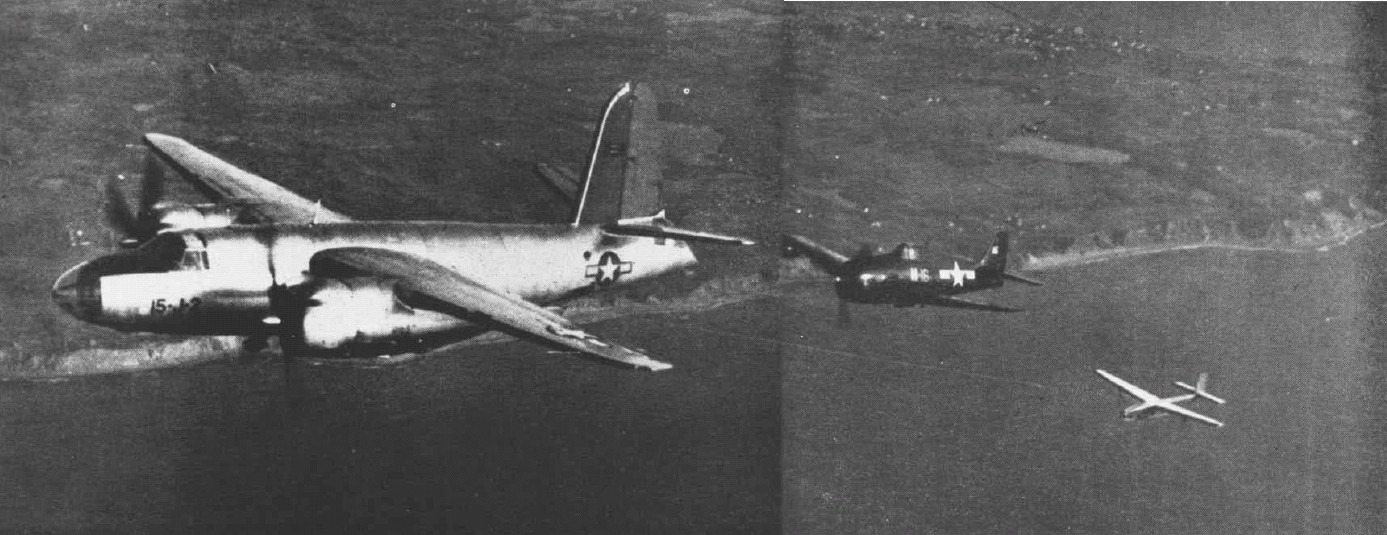
US JM-1 Marauder (B-26C) towing a target aircraft below an F6F-5N Hellcat

=== Post-War ===
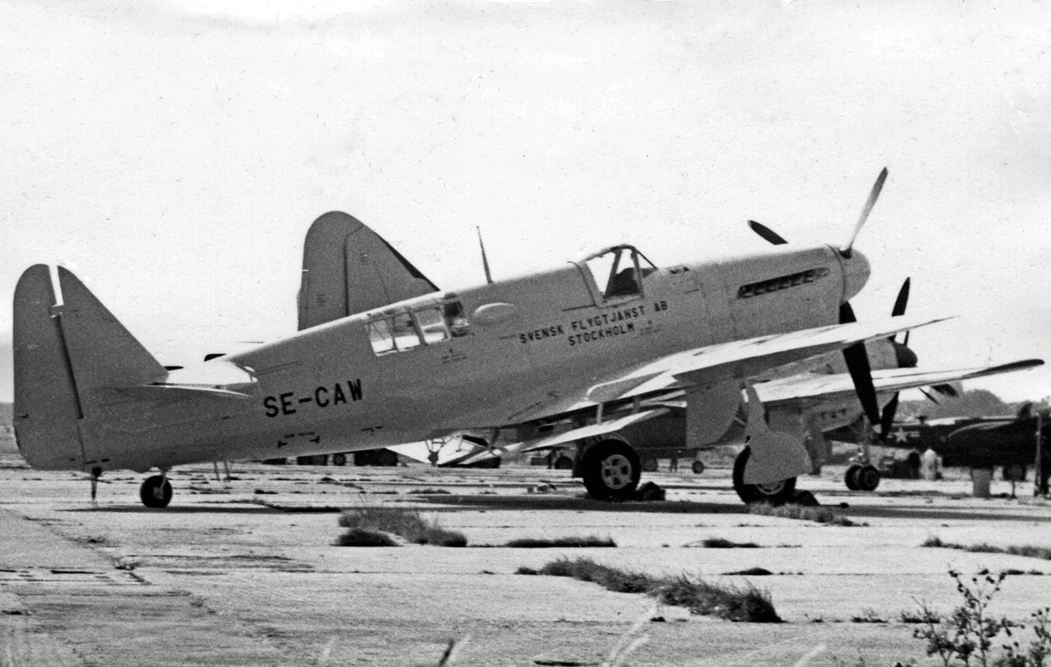
Fairey Firefly TT.1 target tug, painted mustard yellow, of the Swedish Flight Service at Manchester (Ringway Airport) in 1955

The use of such aircraft continued post-war, although a trend developed whereby ex-military aircraft were purchased, modified and operated by civilian companies under contract. Deutsche-Luftfahrt Beratungsdienst of West Germany and Svensk Flygtjänst AB of Sweden were two notable companies in the field in the post-war years, operating such types as the Hawker Sea Fury, Fairey Firefly and Douglas Skyraider. Many air arms however continued to operate target tugs on their own behalf.

In later years the use of civilian companies expanded significantly worldwide, with many companies forming or entering the field in the 1960s and 1970s. The trend was still to use ex-military aircraft, for example Fawcett Aviation in Australia used two ex-RAAF CAC Mustangs from 1960 until the latter part of the 1970s. Flight Systems Inc. commenced operations at Mojave, California with Canadair Sabres converted as QF-86E missile targets, the first aircraft making its first unmanned flight in April 1975; this company later also operated Sabres as target tugs. Flight Systems Inc was later purchased by Tracor and these operations are still performed by BAE Systems Flight Systems with Douglas Skyhawks. The practice of using ex-military aircraft as target tugs (and of air arms retaining older aircraft themselves for such use) resulted in them surviving into an era where such aircraft became desirable as warbirds; many former target tugs are now to be found on the airshow circuit or under restoration to fly, and in aviation museums.

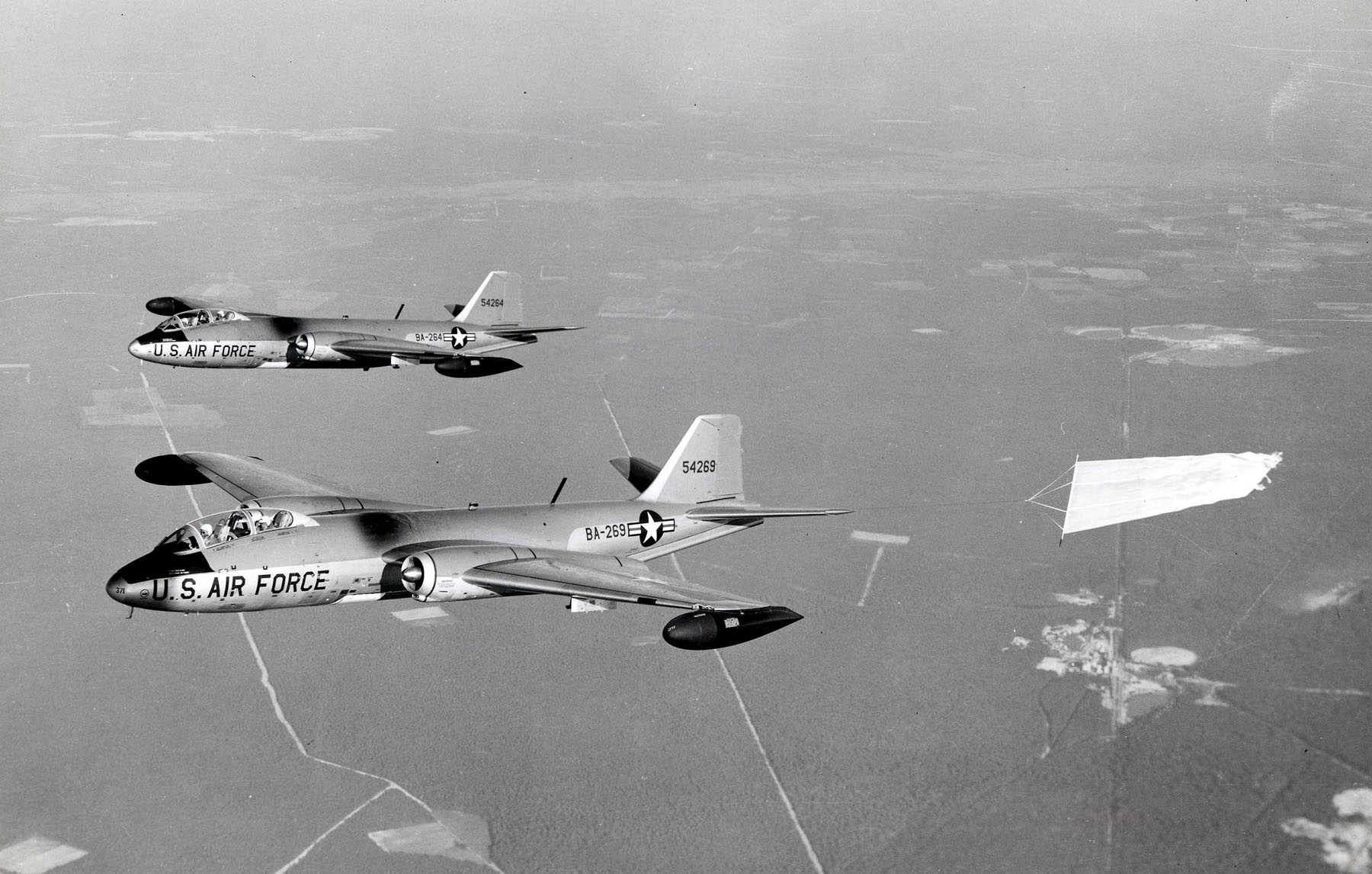
US B-57E Canberra towing a target banner

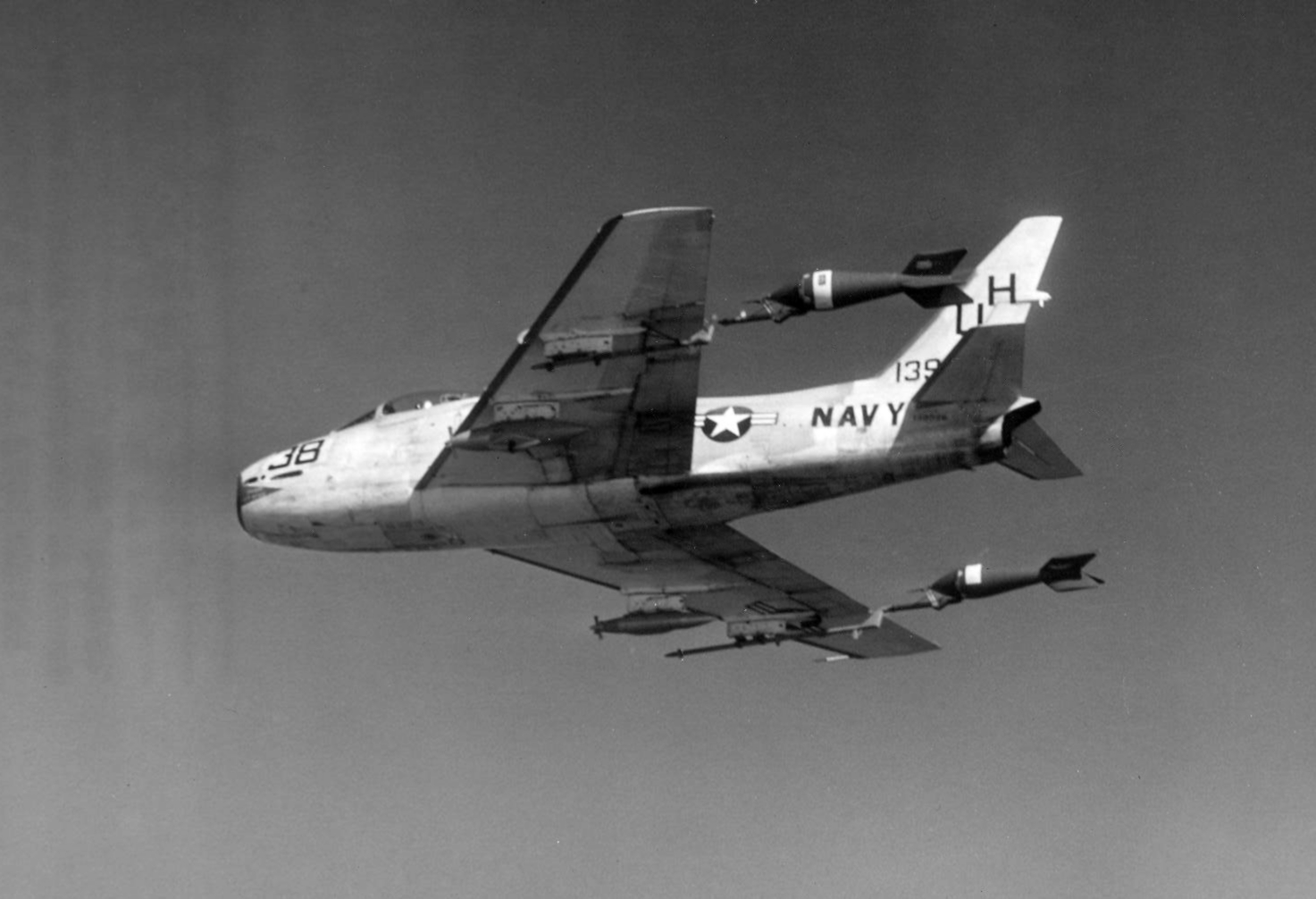
US FJ-4 Fury with retracted towing targets

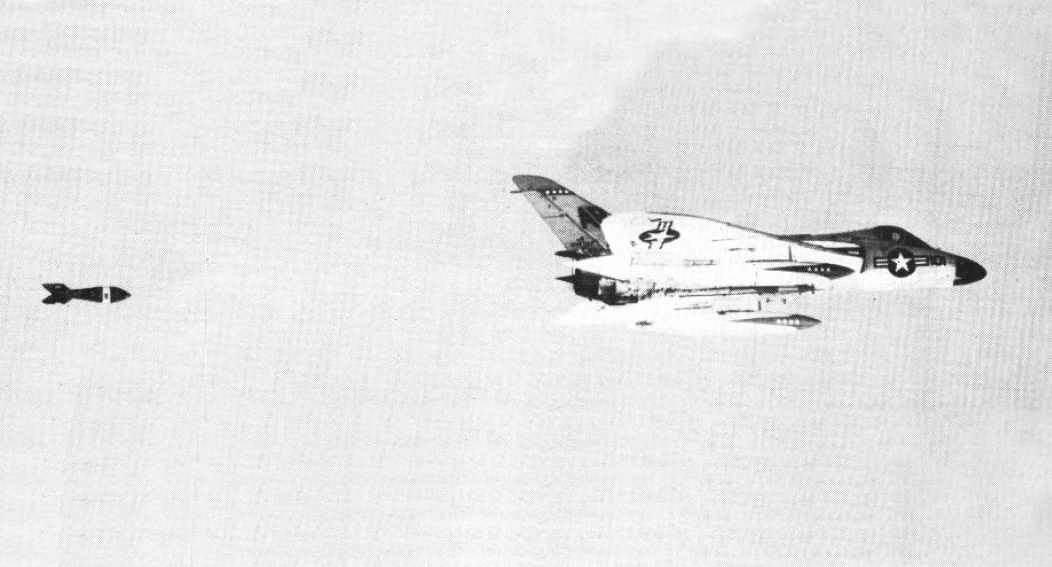
US F4F-1 Skyray with released towing target

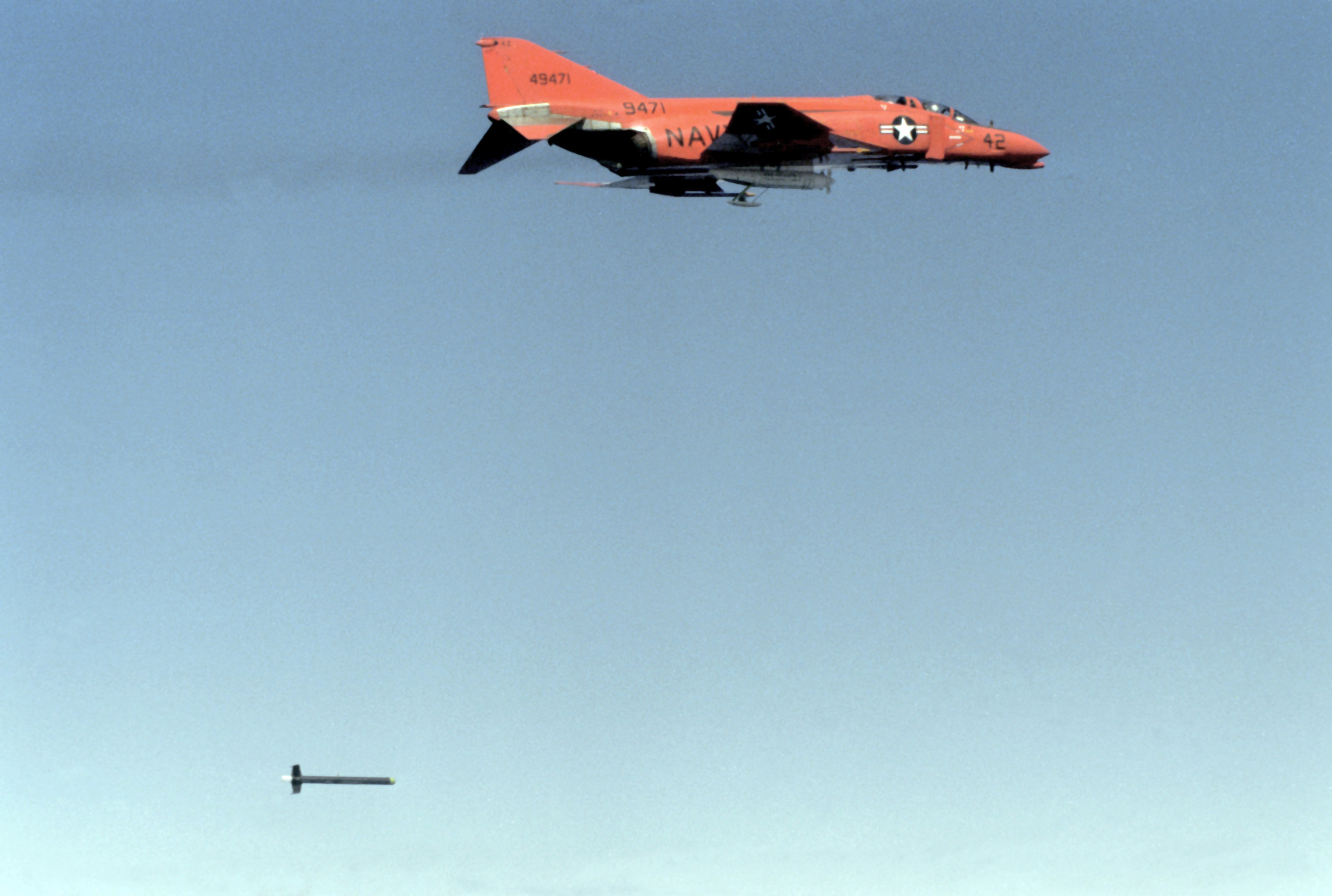
US QF-4B Phantom II target tug towing a missile target

== Current usage ==
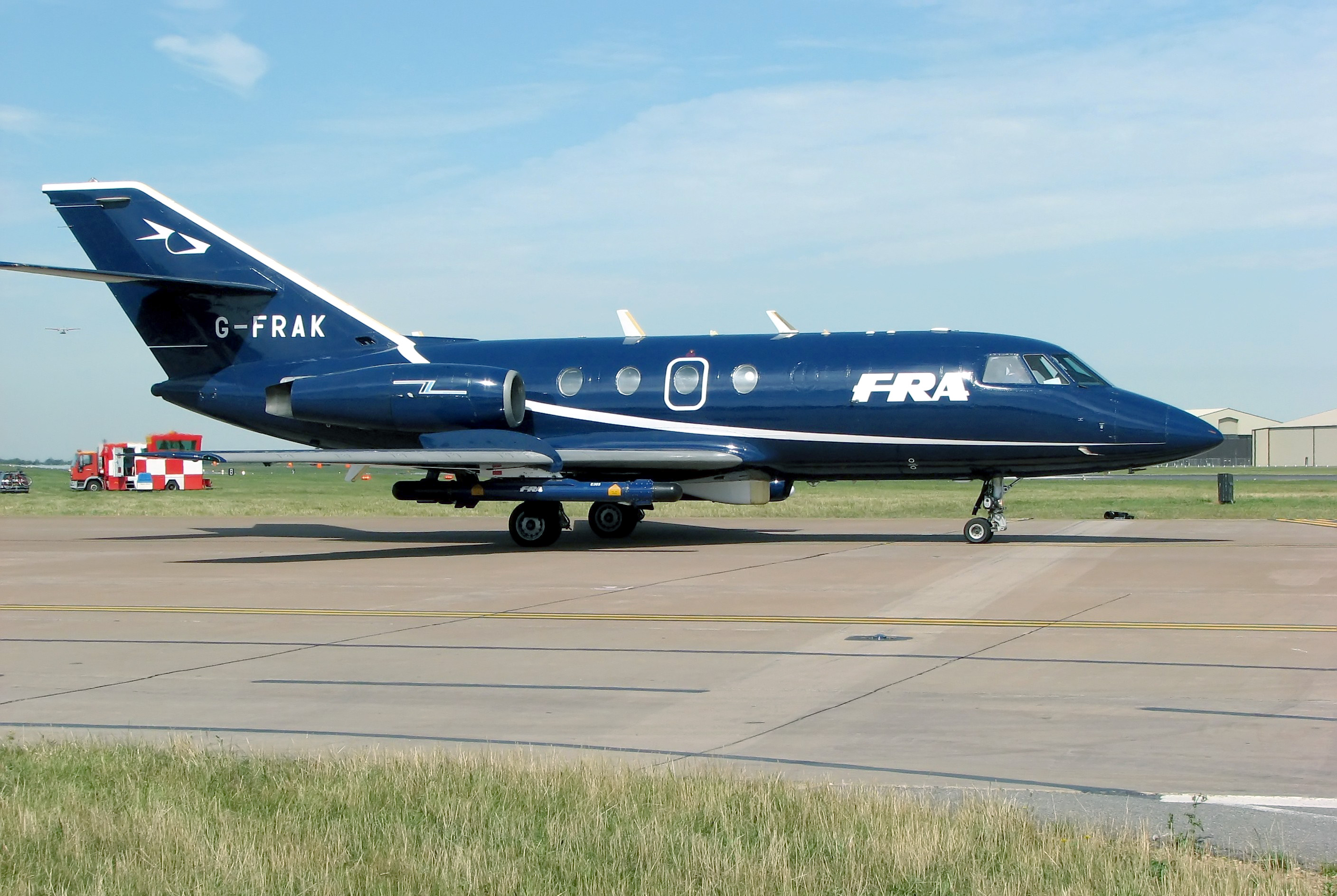
An FR Aviation Services Dassault Falcon 20 modified for target towing at the 2006 Royal International Air Tattoo

Today, more air arms have turned to civilian companies for provision of target towing services. Many companies operating in this field today do so using modified corporate jet aircraft instead of ex-military aircraft. Advantages of operating civil aircraft types include ease of registration (it being difficult in many countries to register ex-military jets as civil aircraft), ease of maintenance and lower operating costs when compared to ex-military aircraft. Companies active in 2007 providing target towing services include FR Aviation Services Ltd. in the UK and associated companies AVdef (in France) and Falcon Special Air Services (in Malaysia) using Falcon 20s; Pel-Air in Australia using Learjets and (in something of a reversal of recent trends) EIS Aircraft Gmbh in Germany using Pilatus PC-9 aircraft.

Target towing operations are not without risk. On September 17, 1994 a Golden Eagle Aviation Lear 35A was accidentally shot down by a ship of the Taiwanese Navy during a live-fire exercise. All four occupants were killed.

== See also ==
- Target drone, an unmanned aerial target craft
- RP-63 "Pinball" (a piloted target craft)
- Towed seaborne target, the naval counterpart
- Banner towing, a similar technique in which an aircraft tows a banner for advertising purposes
- Drogue, a similar device used in aerial refuelling and measuring airspeed
