= F+W C-3605 =

Swiss target towing aircraft built in 1968

C-3605
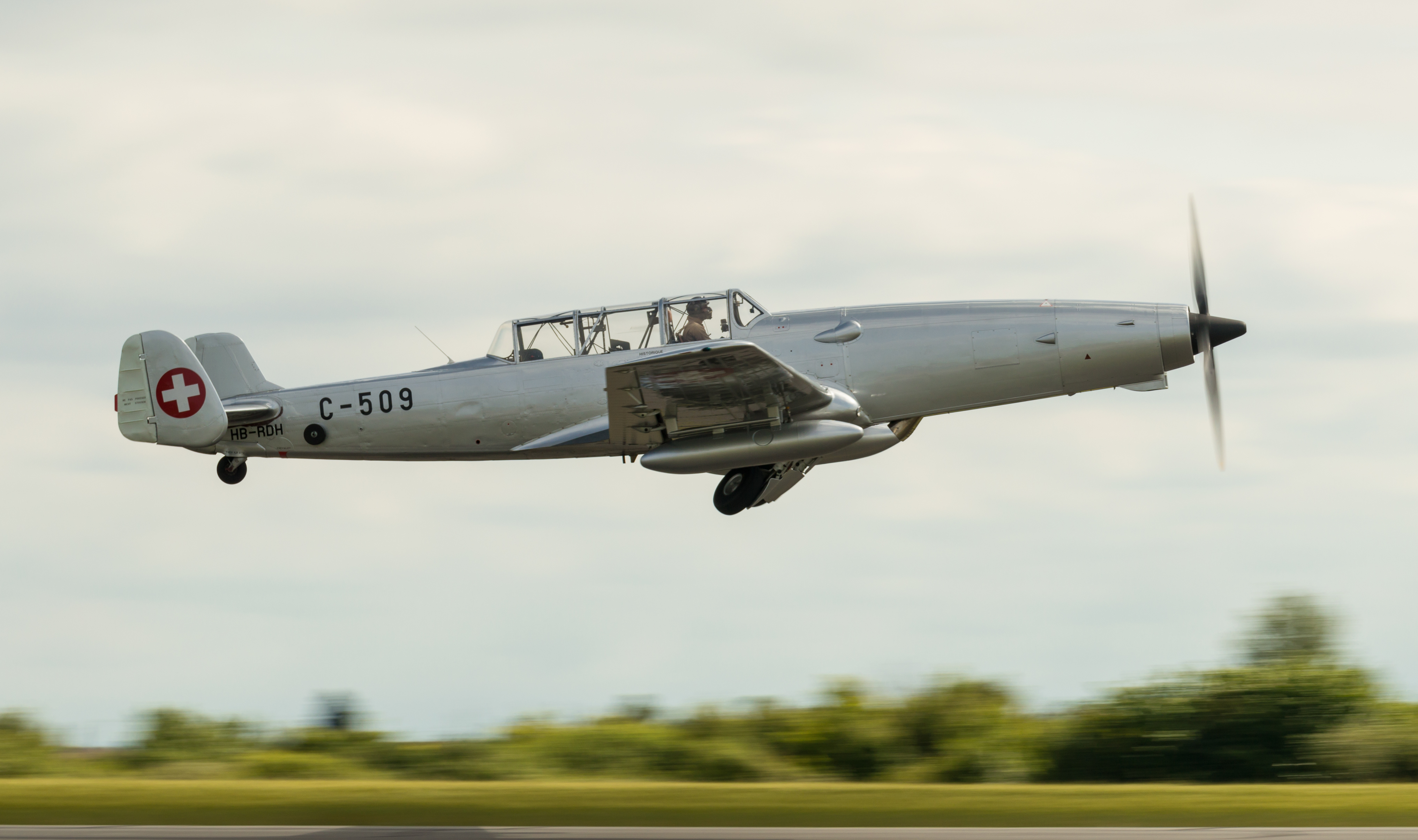
- Schlepp in flight at the AirExpo 2015

General information
- Type: Target tug
- Manufacturer: Farner Werke
- Primary user: Swiss Air Force
- Number built: 24

History
- Manufactured: 1971–1973
- Introduction date: 1971
- First flight: 19 August 1968
- Retired: 1987
- Developed from: EKW C-3603

The F+W C-3605, nicknamed Schlepp ("Tug") or "Alpine Anteater", is a target towing aircraft operated by the Swiss Air Force from 1971–1987. The aircraft was developed during the latter half of the 1960s by the Swiss Federal Construction Works (Eidgenoessische Konstruktionswerkstaette) (EKW), renamed Farner Werke (F+W) in 1972, as a conversion of the existing C-3603 ground attack/target towing aircraft. Following a successful prototype conversion in 1968, 23 aircraft were converted between 1971–1973 with 2 still flying in private hands.

== Development ==
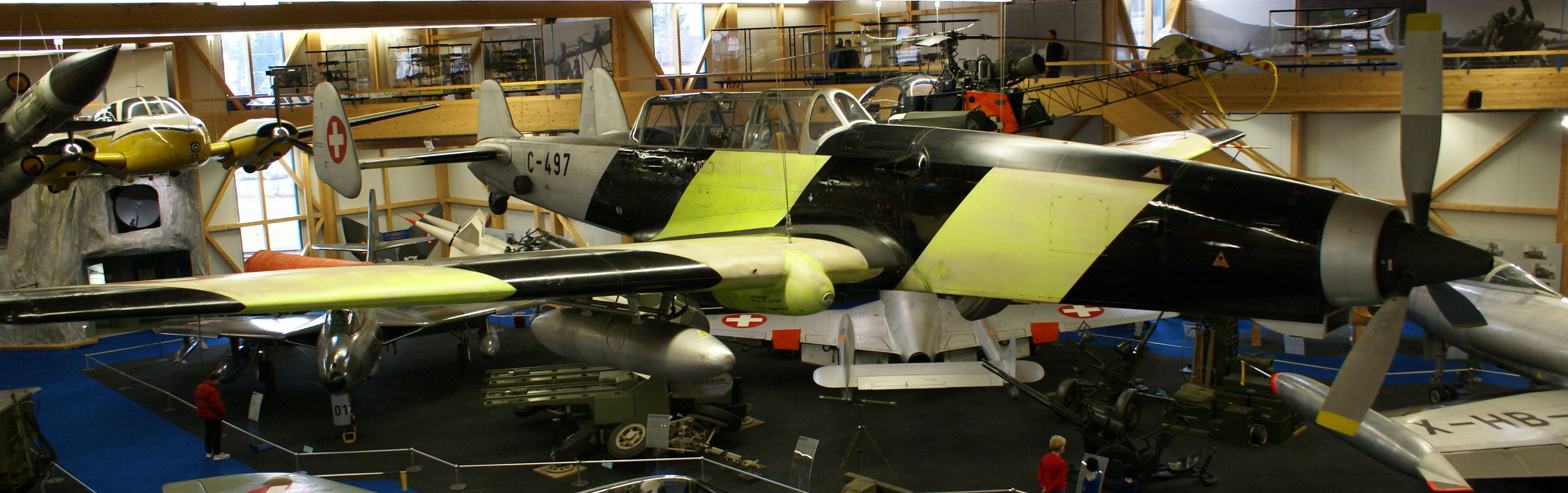
C-3605 at the Aviation Museum in Dübendorf, Switzerland.

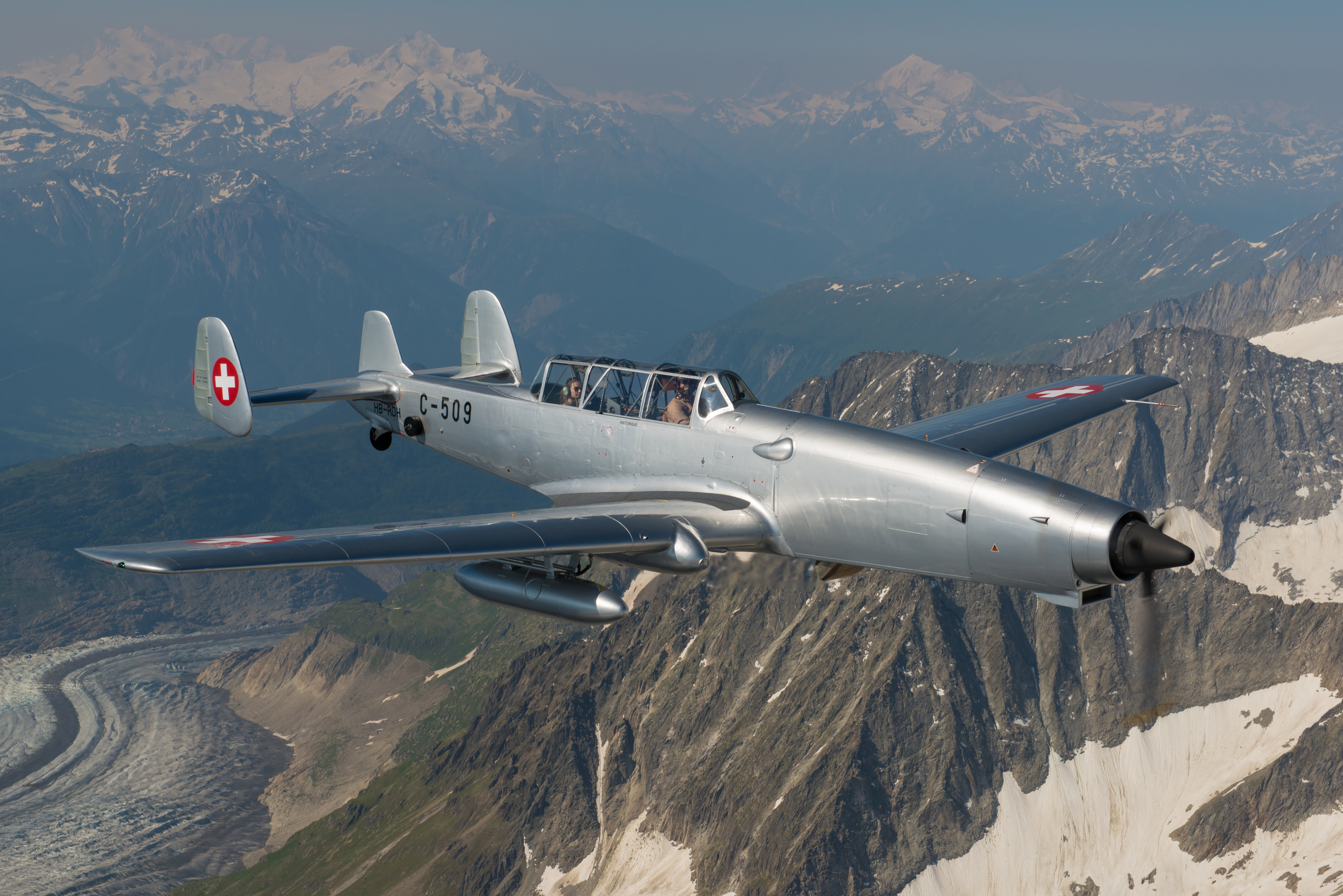
C-3605 HB-RDH airborne over the Swiss alps

In 1967 the Swiss Air Force determined that their C-3603-1 target-towing aircraft still had approximately 10 years of structural life remaining, but that the plane's Hispano-Suiza piston type engines were on the verge of wearing out, with replacements becoming scarce. The C-3603-1 was based on a World War II era ground attack design which had been inspired by the design of the Messerschmitt Bf 109.

Evaluations of various types of foreign aircraft were conducted to find a replacement; however, it was determined in 1965 that the most economical solution would be to re-engineer the existing aircraft with a modern turboprop engine. Accordingly, work began under the direction of Jean-Pierre Weibel to convert the 102nd C-3603 into the prototype C-3605.

The selected replacement engine was a Lycoming T53 turboprop. This was much lighter than the piston engine of the C-3603 and so the conversion included an extension of the nose of the aircraft by 1.82 metres (6.0 ft) to maintain the center of gravity. The remainder of the aircraft was left essentially unmodified. Early flight testing of the prototype began on 19 August 1968. During testing it was found that a third vertical stabiliser was also required.

== Operational history ==
Flight testing showed that the prototype C-3605 possessed satisfactory flight characteristics, and the conversion of 23 C-3603 aircraft to C-3605 standard began. The aircraft were delivered by F+W between 1971 and January 1973. Whilst in the service of the Swiss Air Force the C-3605s were usually painted in conspicuous yellow-and-black striped, high-visibility colour schemes.

The plane operated faithfully in the target towing role, exceeding its expected 10 year structural life. However, by the mid 1980s, the aging aircraft had begun to show signs of airframe fatigue. This led to the decision to retire the type from service in 1987 with the surviving aircraft being sold off and replaced by converted Pilatus PC-9s in the target-towing role.

== Radioactive engines ==
In 2021 it was found that the engines are slightly radioactive, due to the use of thorium in their parts.

== Survivors ==
C-3605s are displayed in several museums, including the Flieger Flab Museum (Aviation Museum) in Dübendorf, Switzerland and the Planes of Fame Museum in Chino, California. The C-3605 is also popular as a "warbird" with civilian owners.

- HB-RDH, C-509, Wk. 289. Airworthy conditions, based in Sion (LSGS) Switzerland. Operated by 46 Aviation S.A.
- HB-RDB, C-494, Wk. 274. Airworthy conditions, based in St. Gallen-Altenrhein (LSZR) Switzerland.

== Operators ==
Switzerland

- Swiss Air Force

== Specifications (C-3605) ==
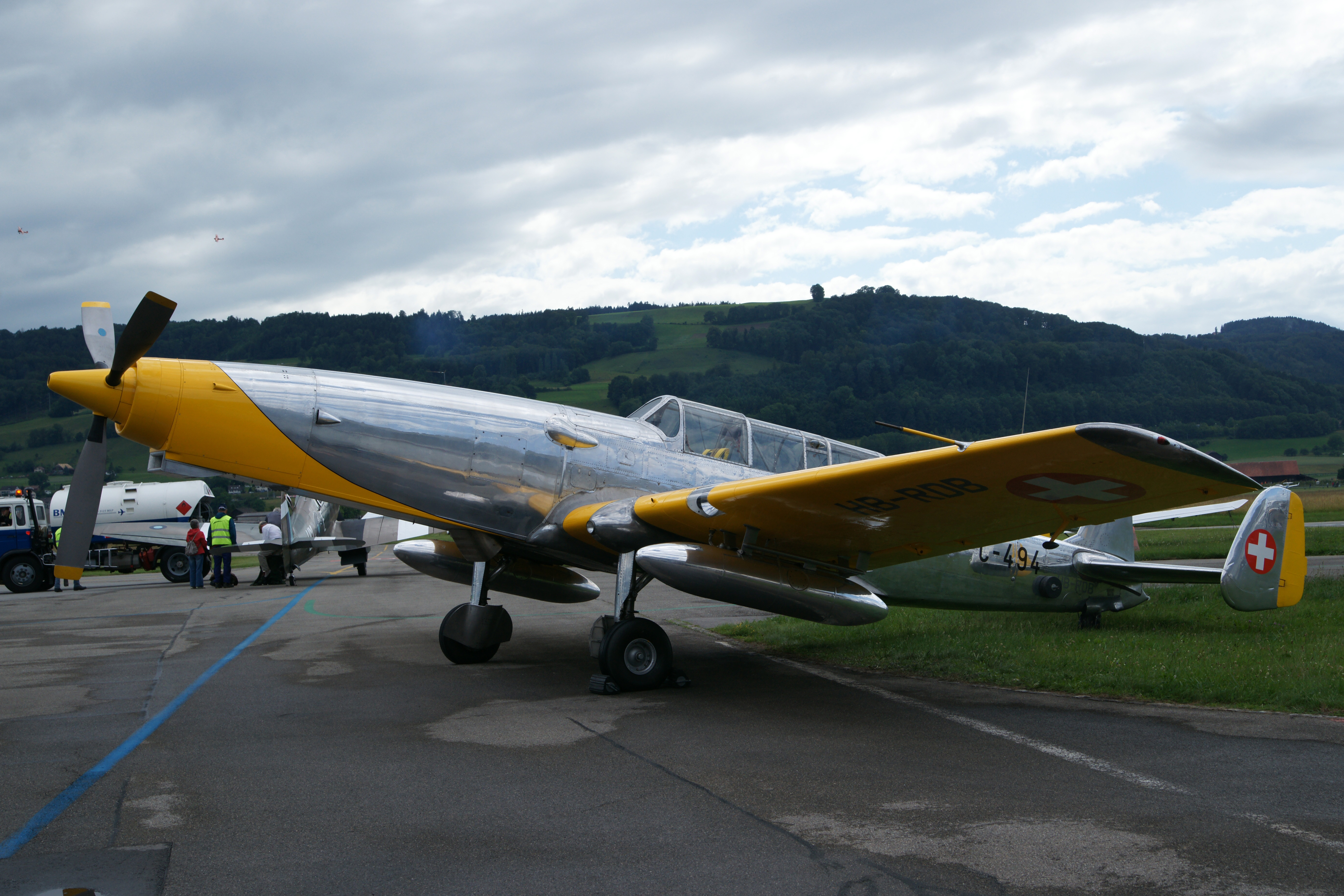
A "warbird" C-3605 parked on the tarmac.

Data from

General characteristics

- Crew: Two (pilot and winch operator)
- Length: 12.03 m (39 ft 6 in)
- Wingspan: 13.74 m (45 ft 1 in)
- Height: 4.05 m (13 ft 3 in)
- Wing area: 28.70 m^{2} (308.9 sq ft)
- Aspect ratio: 6.58
- Empty weight: 2,634 kg (5,807 lb)
- Gross weight: 3,300 kg (7,275 lb)
- Max takeoff weight: 3,716 kg (8,192 lb)
- Fuel capacity: 510 litres (110 imp gal; 130 US gal)
- Powerplant: 1 × Lycoming T53-L-7 turboprop, 820 kW (1,100 shp)
- Propellers: 3-bladed Hamilton Standard 53C51, 3.05 m (10 ft 0 in) diameter

Performance

- Maximum speed: 432 km/h (268 mph, 233 kn) at 3,050 metres (10,010 ft)
- Cruise speed: 420 km/h (260 mph, 230 kn)
- Stall speed: 98 km/h (61 mph, 53 kn) flaps down
- Never exceed speed: 600 km/h (370 mph, 320 kn)
- Range: 980 km (610 mi, 530 nmi) with 10% reserve
- Service ceiling: 10,000 m (33,000 ft)
- Rate of climb: 12.5 m/s (2,470 ft/min)
- Wing loading: 129 kg/m^{2} (26 lb/sq ft) at max takeoff weight
- Power/mass: 3.38 kg/shp (7.45 lb/shp) at max takeoff weight

Armament

- SZW 52 target-towing winch, 2,000 metres (6,600 ft) cable; two underwing hardpoints for supply containers or smoke generators.

Avionics

- 28V DC electrical system; full blind-flying instrumentation.

== See also ==
Related development

- EKW C-36
