= EKW C-36 =

1939 Swiss multi-purpose combat aircraft

C-36
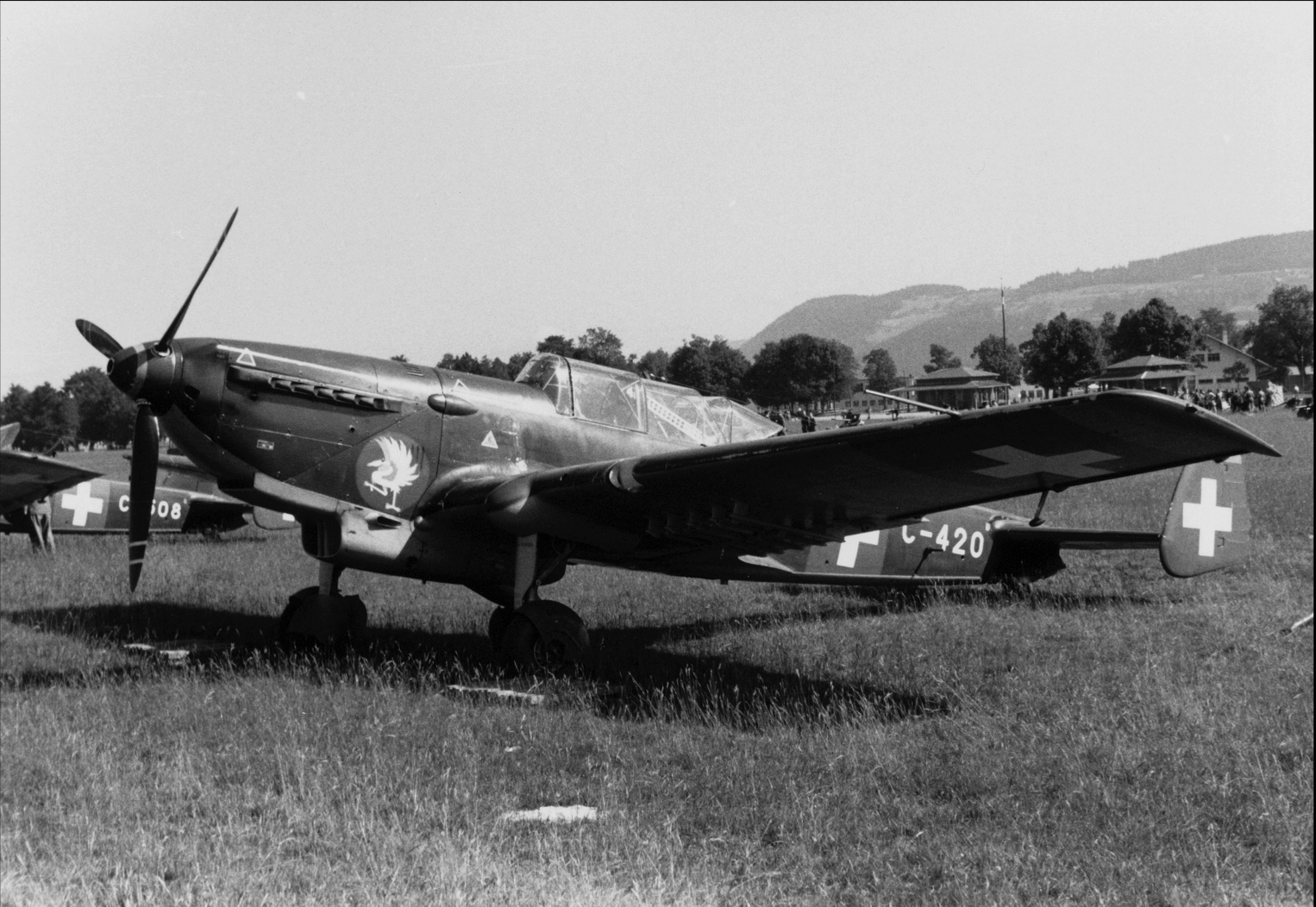
- Swiss C-3603 circa 1942

General information
- Type: Ground-attack aircraft
- National origin: Switzerland
- Manufacturer: EKW
- Primary user: Swiss Air Force
- Number built: 175

History
- Introduction date: 1942
- First flight: 15 May 1939
- Variant: F+W C-3605

The EKW C-36 is a Swiss multi-purpose combat aircraft of the 1930s and 1940s, built by the Eidgenoessische Konstruktionswerkstaette. It was a single-engined monoplane with a crew of two. It entered service during World War II in 1942, and despite being obsolete, remained in front line use until the early 1950s, and as a target tug until 1987.

== Development and design ==
In 1935, the Swiss Air Force developed a requirement for a replacement for the Fokker C.V-E biplanes, which were used as reconnaissance aircraft, escort fighters and patrol aircraft. To meet this requirement, the Swiss Federal Constructions Works (EKW) proposed two designs, a modernised C.V, the EKW C-35 and an all new monoplane, the C-36.

Orders for 80 C-35s were placed in 1936, but no decision was made about whether to order the C-36, with preference being given to the purchase of foreign twin-engined aircraft for the role, attempts been made to buy Messerschmitt Bf 110s from Germany or Potez 63s from France. These attempts failed, however, and in 1938 approval was given for EKW to complete detailed design of the C-36 and to build a prototype.

The first prototype, the C-3601, carried out its maiden flight on 15 May 1939. It was a low-winged cantilever monoplane of all-metal construction. It was powered by a single licence-built Hispano-Suiza 12Y engine driving a three-bladed variable-pitch propeller. A crew of two sat in tandem under a long, continuous canopy. The aircraft was fitted with a twin tail, and had a fixed tailwheel undercarriage.

The C-3601 crashed on 20 August 1939 due to wing flutter, but a second prototype, the C-3602, which had a more powerful engine and a constant-speed propeller flew on 30 November that year. Testing was successful, and orders were placed in 1940 for an initial batch of 10 C-3603 with a retractable undercarriage.

== Operational history ==
The C-3603s, along with EKW D-3801s, fought off trespassing aircraft to defend Swiss neutrality, but were soon relegated to training and target-towing duties. The last variant of the C-36 aircraft family, the turboprop powered C-3605, had its maiden flight in 1968 remaining in service with the Swiss Air Force until 1988. Thanks to its black and yellow striped colouration, the C-3605 was called "Flying Zebra Crossing". After retirement several aircraft were kept airworthy on the Civil aircraft register.

== Variants ==
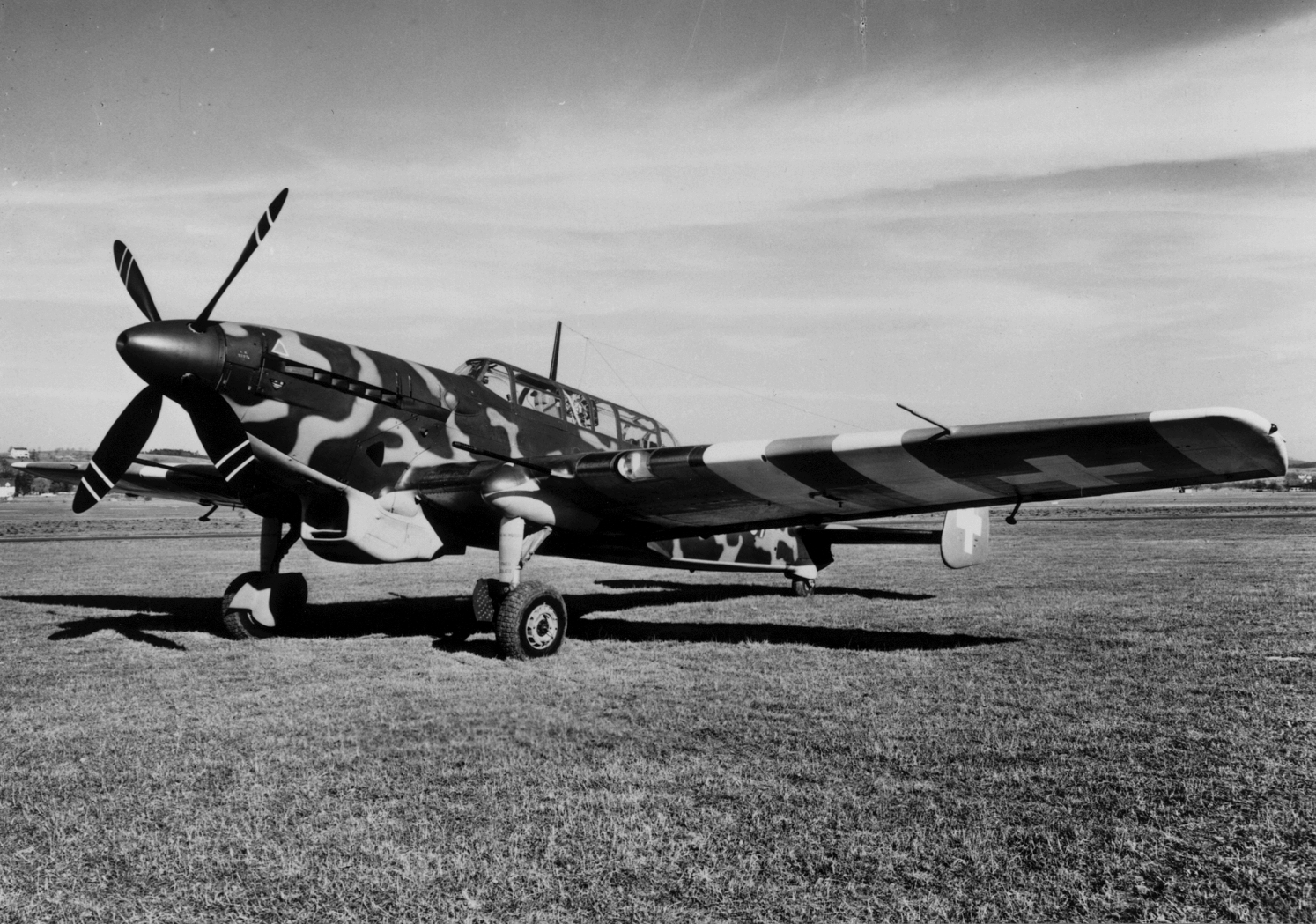
The C-3604 in 1950

C-3601
First prototype with long-span wings, fixed undercarriage and powered by 641 kW (860 hp) Hispano-Suiza 12YCrs engine.
C-3602
Second prototype powered by 746 kW (1,000 hp) Hispano-Suiza 12 Y-51.

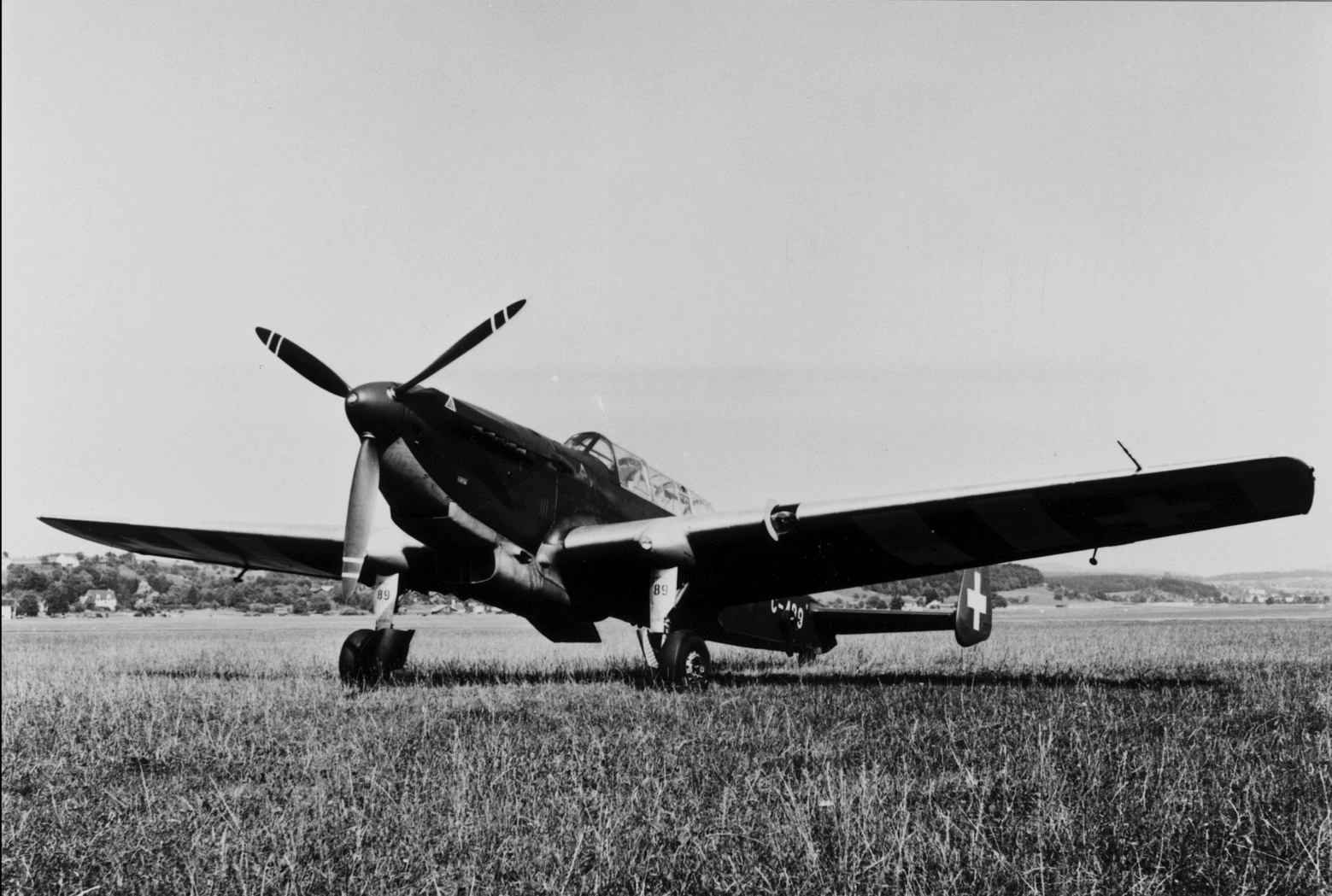
C-3603

C-3603
Production version with retractable undercarriage, powered by Hispano-Suiza 12 Y-51. Armed by one 20mm Oerlikon moteur-canon cannon firing through propeller hub, two 7.5mm machine guns in the wings and two machine guns in the rear cockpit.

C-3603-0
Service trial aircraft with long-span (15.10 m (48 ft 6½ in)) wings. 10 built, of which 9 were later converted to C-3603-1 standard.
C-3603-1
Main production version, with short span (13.74 m (45 ft 1 in)) wings. 142 built by 1944, plus further 6 assembled from spare parts in 1947–48. 20 converted to target tugs (Schlepp) from 1946 by Farner Werke, and 40 (including surviving original conversions) to improved standard by FFA and Farner from 1953–54.

C-3603-1 Tr

Advanced trainer version. Two built.

C-3604
More powerful and heavier armed derivative of C-3603, powered by 929 kW (1,245 hp) Saurer YS-2 (a more powerful Swiss development of the Hispano-Suiza 12Y-51) and carrying an extra two 20mm cannon in its wings. One prototype and twelve production aircraft built.
C-3605
Turboprop version with Lycoming T53 engine (24 converted from C-3603-1). It was much larger and also more powerful than the C-3601, with a maximum speed of 560km/h or 296mph.

== Operators ==
Switzerland

- Swiss Air Force

== Specifications (C-3603) ==
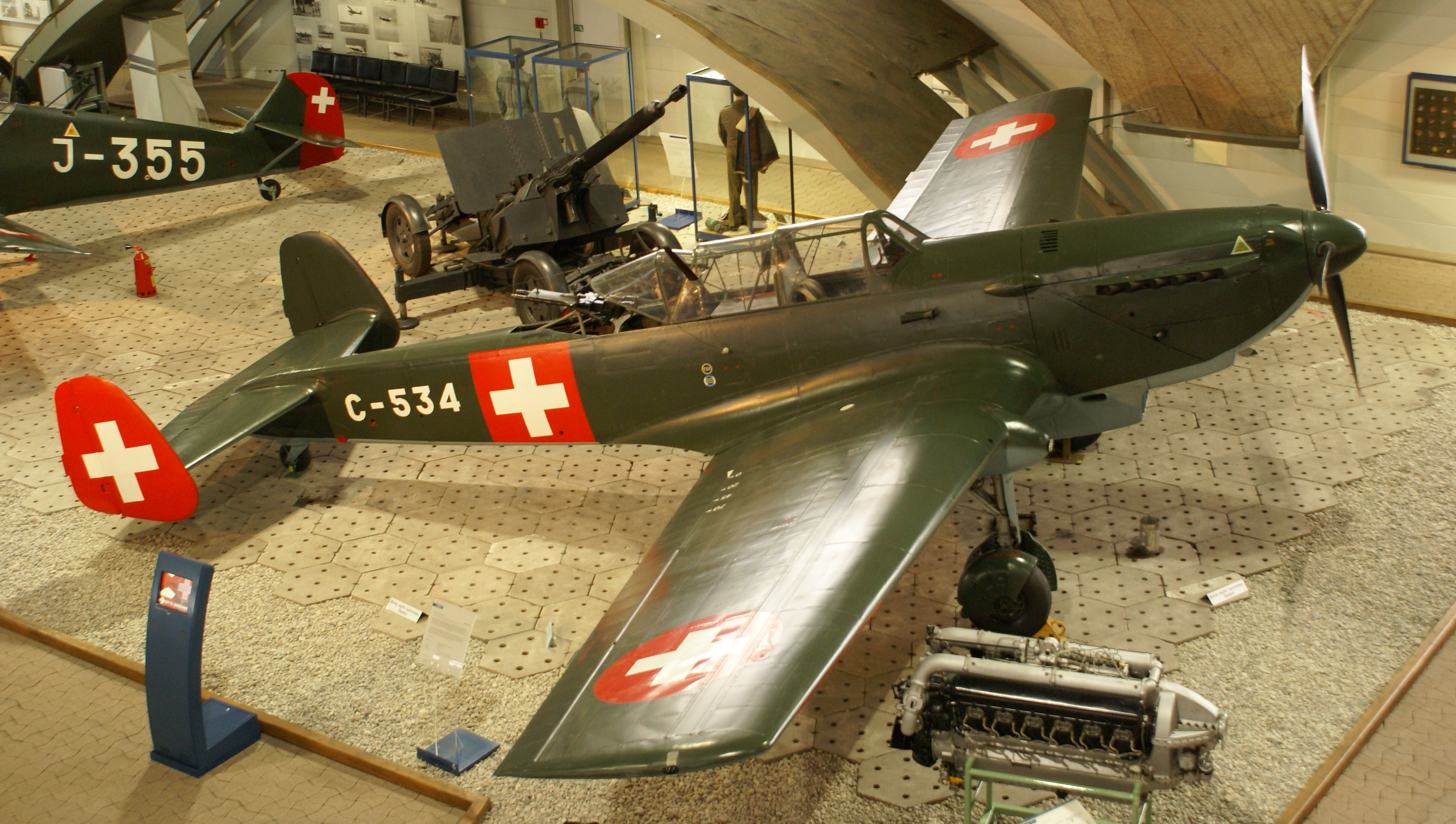
EKW C-36 at Flieger-Flab-Museum

Data from Enduring Tug:The Swiss C-36 Series.

General characteristics

- Crew: Two
- Length: 10.23 m (33 ft 2.33 in)
- Wingspan: 13.74 m (45 ft 1 in)
- Height: 3.29 m (10 ft 9.5 in)
- Wing area: 28.4 m^{2} (305.7 sq ft)
- Empty weight: 2,315 kg (5,103 lb)
- Gross weight: 4,085 kg (9,006 lb)
- Powerplant: 1 × Hispano-Suiza 12Y-51 V12, 746 kW (1,000 hp)

Performance

- Maximum speed: 476 km/h (296 mph, 257 kn)
- Range: 680 km (425 mi, 369 nmi)
- Endurance: 2 hours
- Service ceiling: 8,700 m (28,550 ft)
- Rate of climb: 10.4 m/s (2,050 ft/min)

Armament

- 1× 20 mm cannon and 2× 7.5 mm machine guns fixed forward firing
- 2× 7.5 mm machine guns in rear cockpit
- 400 kg (880 lb) bombs

== See also ==
Related development

- F+W C-3605

Aircraft of comparable role, configuration, and era

- Ilyushin Il-2
