= List of Dassault Mirage III operators =

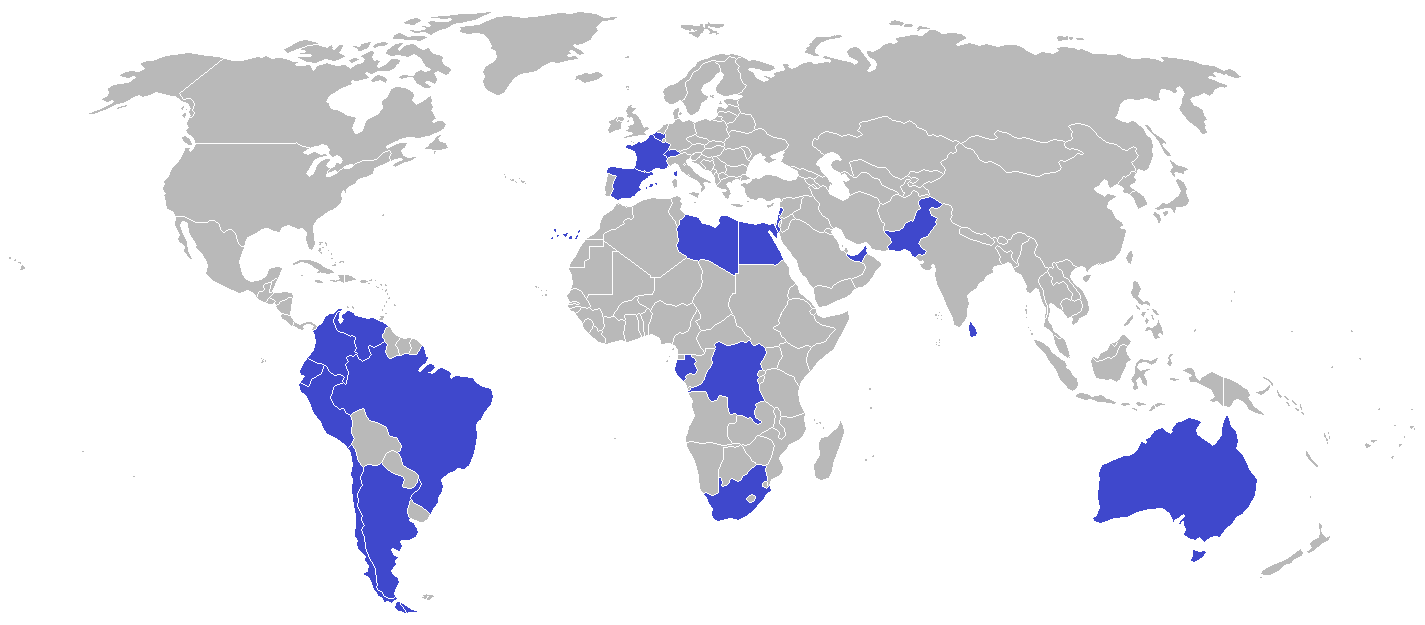
Operators of the Mirage III and its domestic as well as foreign derivatives, including the Mirage 5

This is a list of Dassault Mirage IIIs, Dassault Mirage 5s, and Mirage 50s used by national air forces. The Central Intelligence Agency once estimated that a slightly over 800 of the three aircraft types had been exported to various countries around the world.

The key "1S" indicates a single-seat Mirage fighter, while "2S" indicates a two-seat Mirage, and "PR" indicates a photo reconnaissance aircraft.

== Operators ==
=== Abu Dhabi and the UAE ===
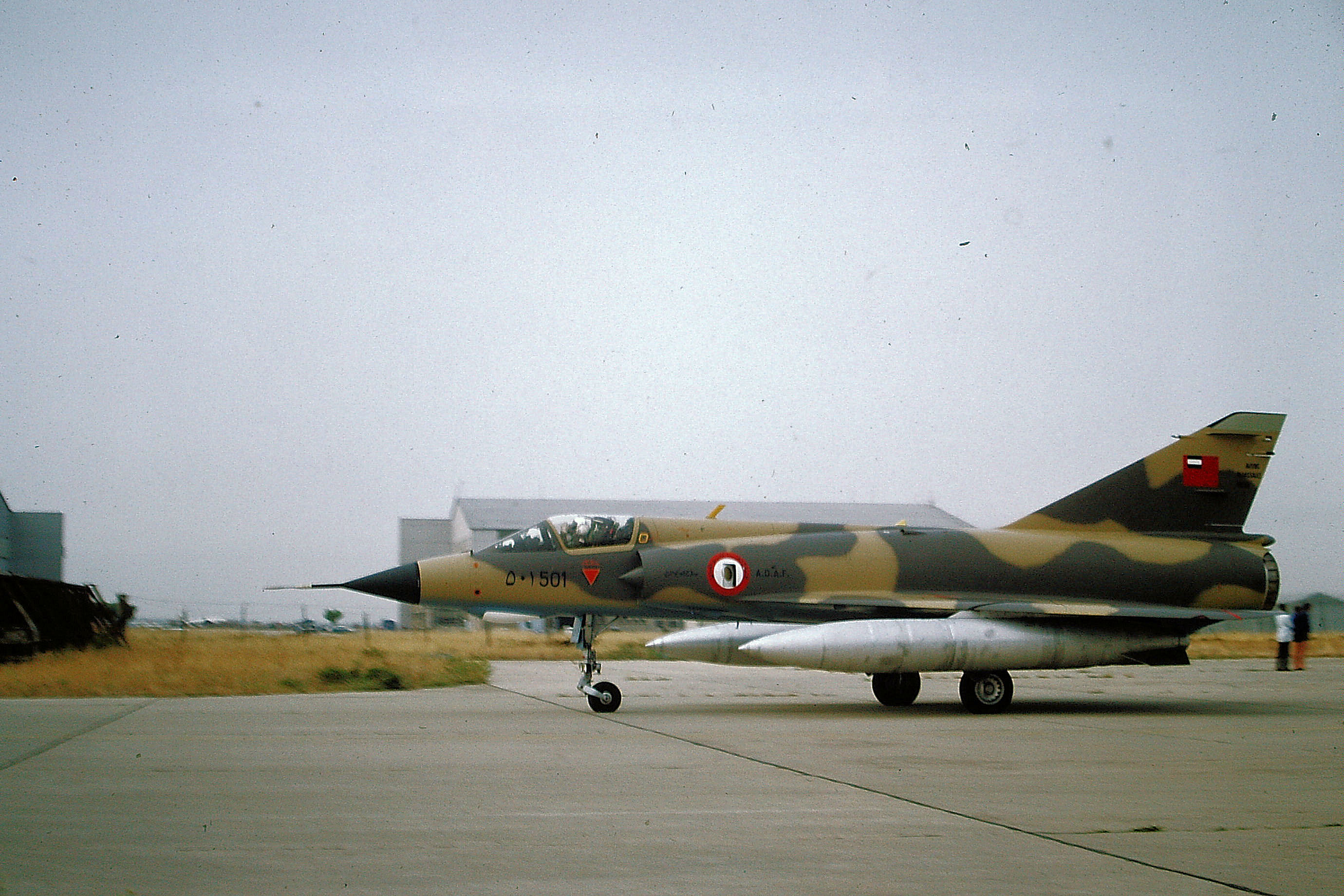
Dassault Mirage 5EAD, taxiway of Istres (France) on 3 July 1976, delivered to Abu Dhabi Air Force (ADAF).

Abu Dhabi Defence Force
United Arab Emirates Air Force

- No.3 Squadron "Shaheen", based at Al Dhafra

Total number of aircraft delivered:

- 1S: 12 5AD + 14 5EAD
- 2S: 3 5DAD
- PR: 3 RAD

Out of Service. All of the remaining aircraft (7 5AD, 9 5EAD, 2 5DAD, and 1 5RAD) were sold to Egypt in 2004.

=== Argentina ===
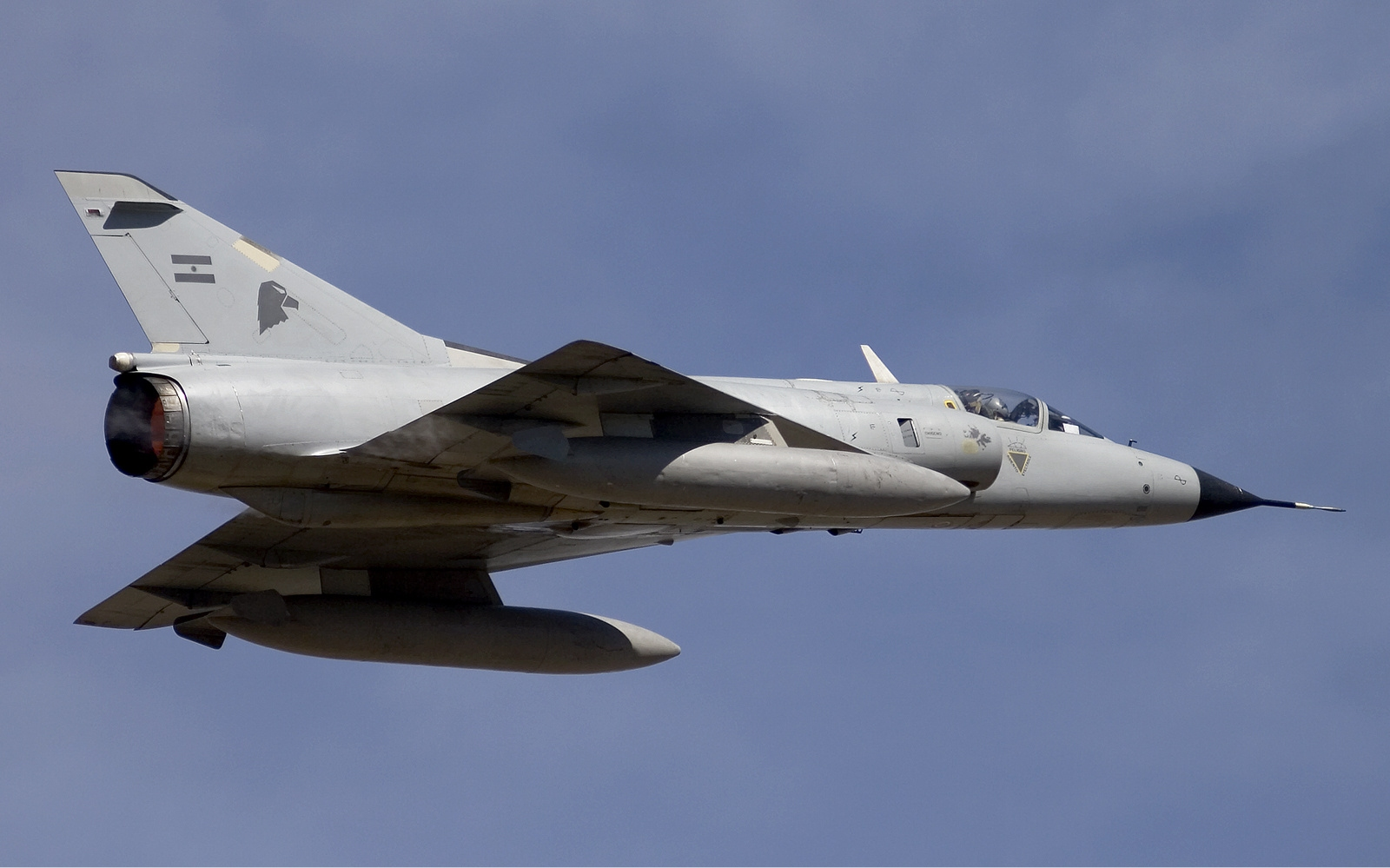
Argentina Air Force Dassault Mirage IIIEA

Argentine Air Force

- Escuadrón I de Caza Interceptora (Mirage III), later Grupo VIII de Caza, based at Moreno
- Grupo VI de Caza (Dagger, then also Mirage III and Mirage 5P), based at Tandil
- Grupo X de Caza (Mirage III, then Mirage 5P), based at Río Gallegos

Total number of aircraft delivered:

- 1S: 19 IIICJ + 17 IIIEA
- 2S: 3 IIIBJ + 4 IIIDA
- Plus 35 IAI 1S Dagger A + 4 2S Dagger T. Survivors locally updated to Finger standards.
- Plus 10 5P. Later locally upgraded to a standard similar to that of the Daggers.
- IIICJs & IIIBJs were ex-Israeli, 5Ps were ex-Peruvian.

All were retired in December 2015.

=== Australia ===
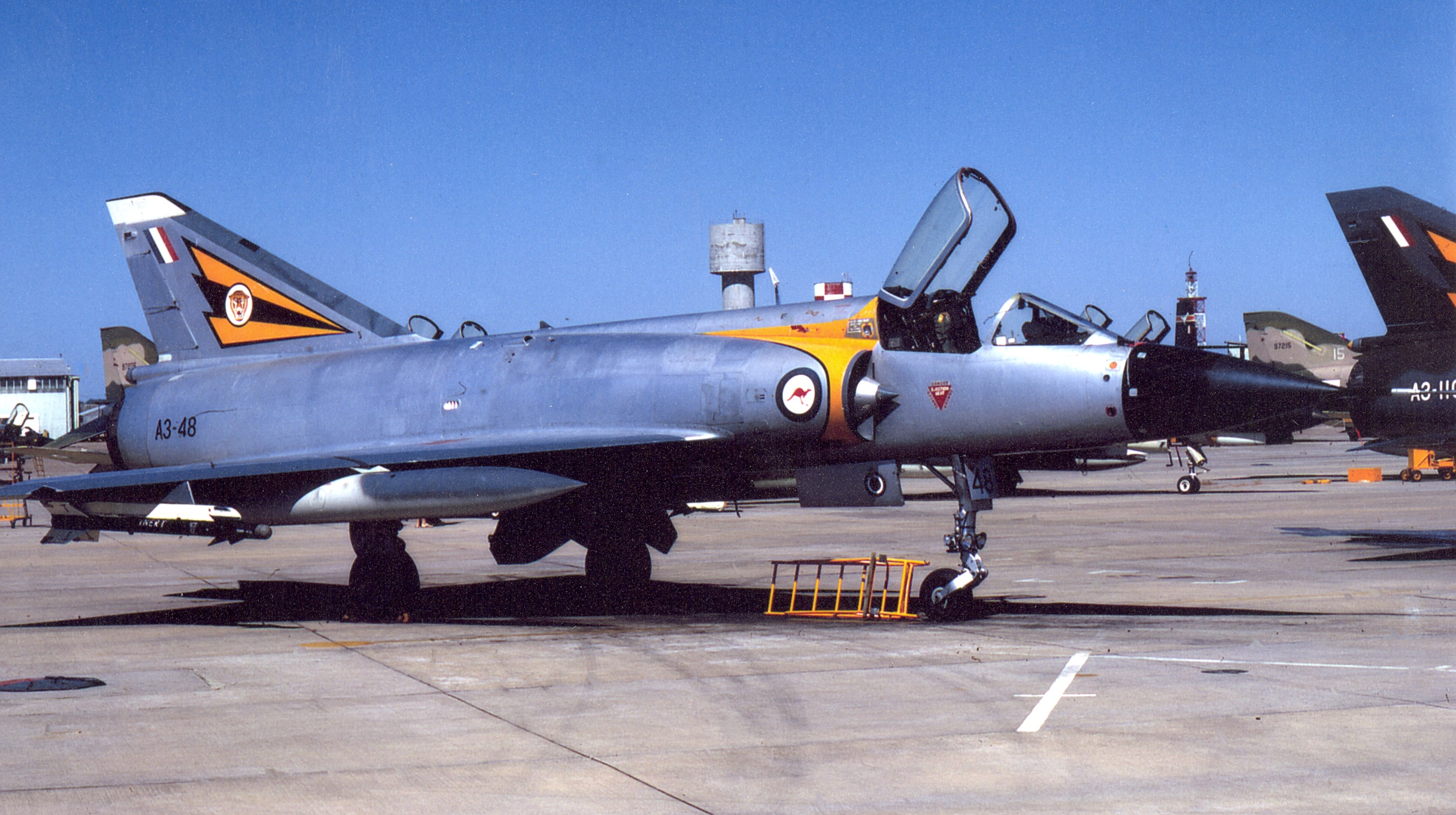
RAAF Mirage IIIO in 1978

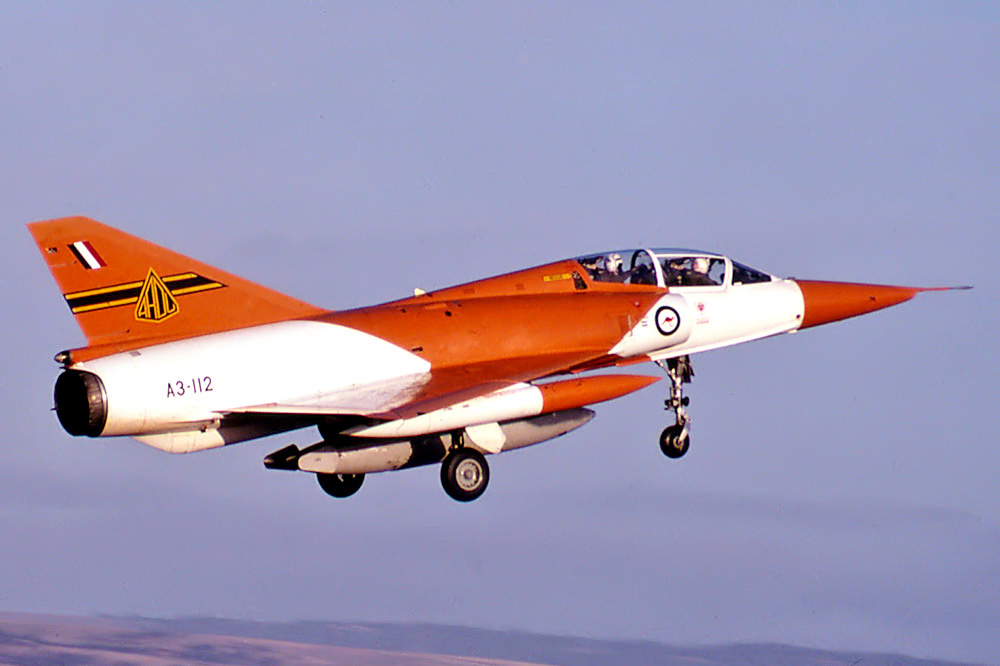
ARDU Mirage IIID in 1984

Royal Australian Air Force

- No. 3 Squadron RAAF, 1967-1986
- No. 75 Squadron RAAF, 1965-1988
- No. 76 Squadron RAAF, 1966-1973
- No. 77 Squadron RAAF, 1969-1987
- No. 79 Squadron RAAF, 1969-1988
- No. 2 Operational Conversion Unit RAAF, 1964-1985
- Aircraft Research and Development Unit, 1964-1989

Total number of aircraft delivered:

- 1S: 49 IIIO(F) + 51 IIIO(A)
- 2S: 16 IIID

116 Mirage IIIs (RAAF serials A3-1 to -116) were in service with the RAAF from 1964 to 1989. Most built locally, 50 sold to Pakistan in 1990, together with additional engines and spare parts.

=== Belgium ===
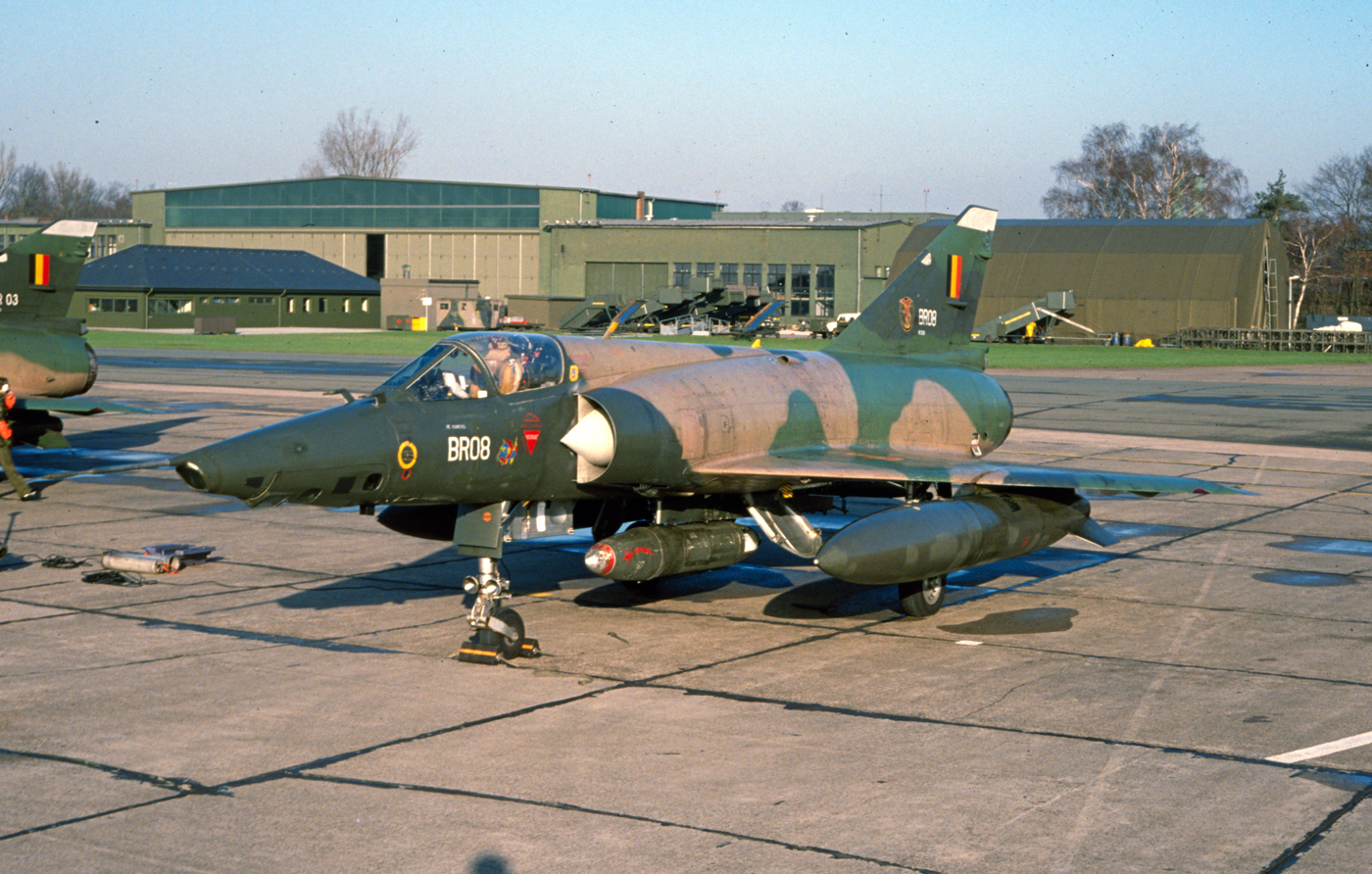
A Mirage 5BR in 1987

Belgian Air Force

- 1st Squadron, 1971-1988
- 2nd Squadron, 1970-1988
- 42nd Squadron, 1971-1993

Total number of aircraft delivered:

- 1S: 63 5BA
- 2S: 16 5BD
- PR: 27 5BR

All but three of the aircraft were built locally under license. A minor "MIRSIP" upgrade was performed on 20 survivors in the early 1990s, but all were then retired. 25 aircraft, including all of the upgraded ones, were transferred to Chile as Elkans in 1995-1996.

=== Brazil ===
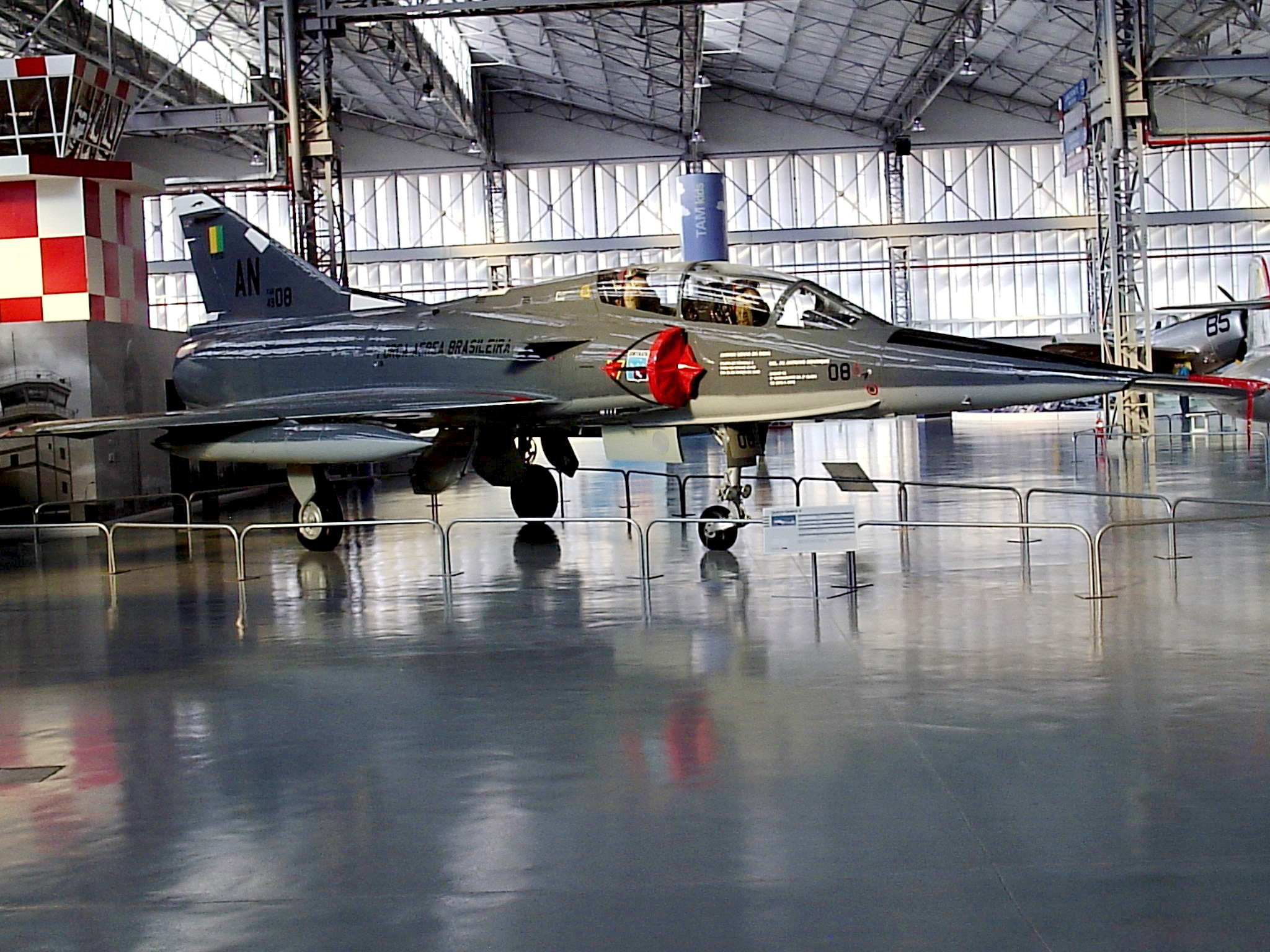
Mirage IIIBBR

Brazilian Air Force

- 1° Grupo de Defesa Aérea, based at Anápolis

Total number of aircraft delivered:

- 1S: 22 F-103E (Mirage IIIEBR) (16 new-build and 6 second-hand French Mirage IIIEs)
- 2S: 6 F-103D (Mirage IIIDBR) (4 new-build and 2 second-hand French Mirage IIIRs rebuilt as twin-seat aircraft) + 4 IIIBBR (2 second-hand French Mirage IIIBEs and 2 second-hand Zairian Mirage 5DMs)

Survivors upgraded with canards starting from 1989. One F-103E fitted with a refueling probe in 1992. Last one retired in 2005.

=== Chile ===
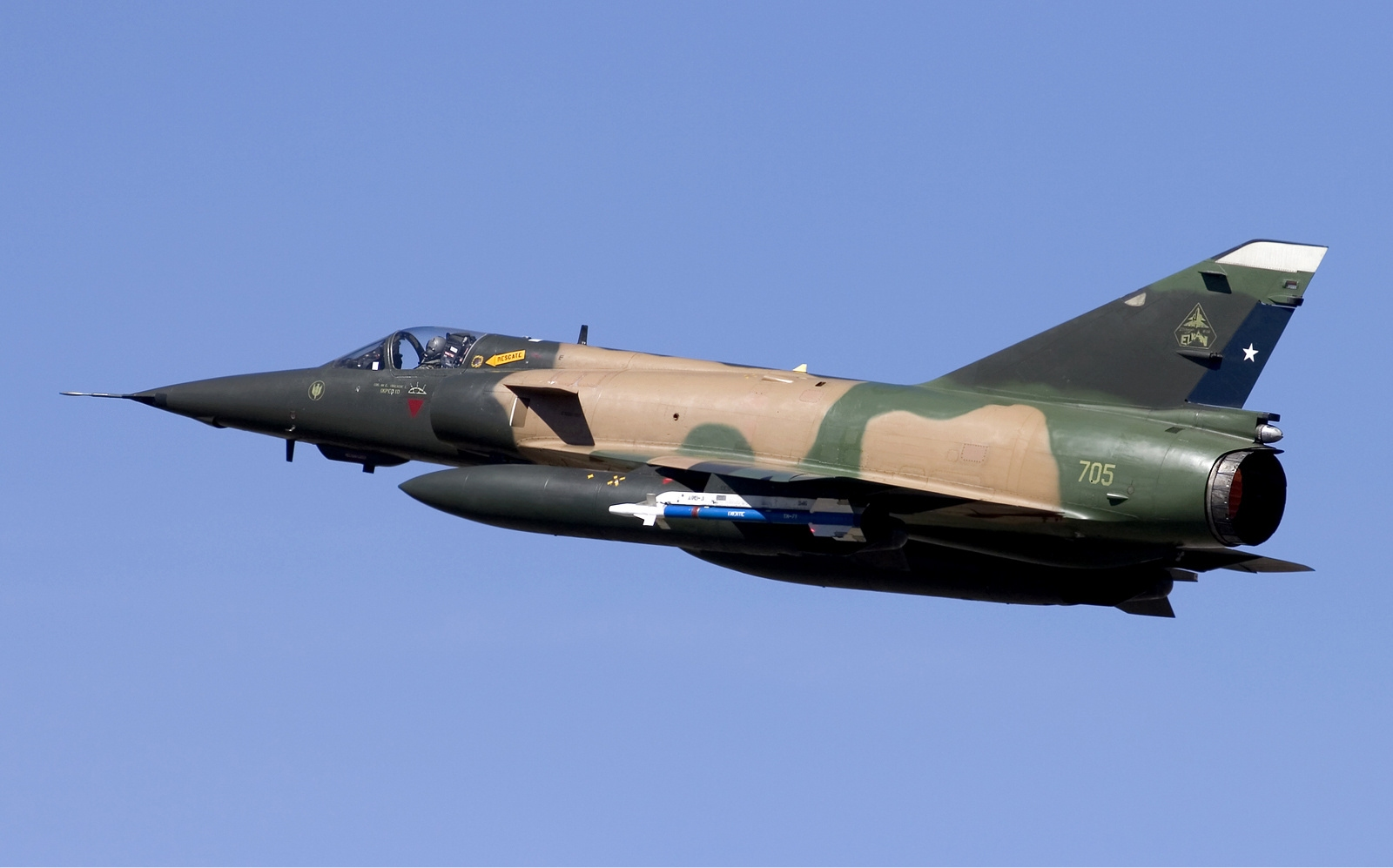
Chile Air Force Dassault (SABCA) Mirage 5MA Elkan

Chilean Air Force

- Grupo de Aviación N° 4 (Mirage M50), Aeropuerto Arturo Merino Benitez (Santiago), moved to Base Aérea de Chabunco (Punta Arenas) in 1986
- Grupo de Aviación N° 8 (Mirage M5M), Base Aérea de Cerro Moreno (Antofagasta)

Total number of aircraft delivered:

- 1S: 6 50C + 8 50FC + 15 5MA "Elkan"
- 2S: 3 50DC + 5 5MD "Elkan" + 1 non-modernized ex-Belgian Air Force 5BD
- PR: 4 non-modernized ex-Belgian Air Force 5BR

50FC were upgraded by Dassault from French Air Force 5Fs. All of the surviving Mirage 50s were updated by Enaer to Pantera standard from 1988 to 2002. Elkans are modernized ex-Belgian Air Force Mirage 5s. Some ex-South African Cheetahs as spares. Retired on 31 December 2007

=== Colombia ===
Colombian Air Force

- Grupo Aéreo de Combate No. 1, Base Militar de Palanquero, Puerto Salgar
  - Escuadrón de Combate No. 212 (Mirage 5)
  - Escuadrón de Combate No. 213 (Mirage 5CODM), later renamed Escuadrón de Combate No.111 "Dardos"

Total number of aircraft delivered:

- 1S: 14 5COA. Survivors converted to 5COAM
- 2S: 2 5COD. Survivors converted to 5CODM
- PR: 2 5COR. Survivor converted to 5COAM

Starting in the late 1980s, surviving Colombian Mirages were upgraded to an improved standard, with new avionics similar to those found on the Kfir, as well as canards and an in-flight refueling probe. The upgraded aircraft were designated Mirage 5COAM/CODM. All were retired in 2009.

=== Ecuador ===
Ecuadorian Air Force

Delivered in late 2009 as a gift from Venezuela, but without air-to-air or anti-ship missiles and never served operationally. Stored at first at the Base Aérea Eloy Alfaro (Manta), then at Base Aérea Taura.

Total number of aircraft delivered:

- 1S: 4 50V
- 2S: 2 50DV

=== Egypt ===
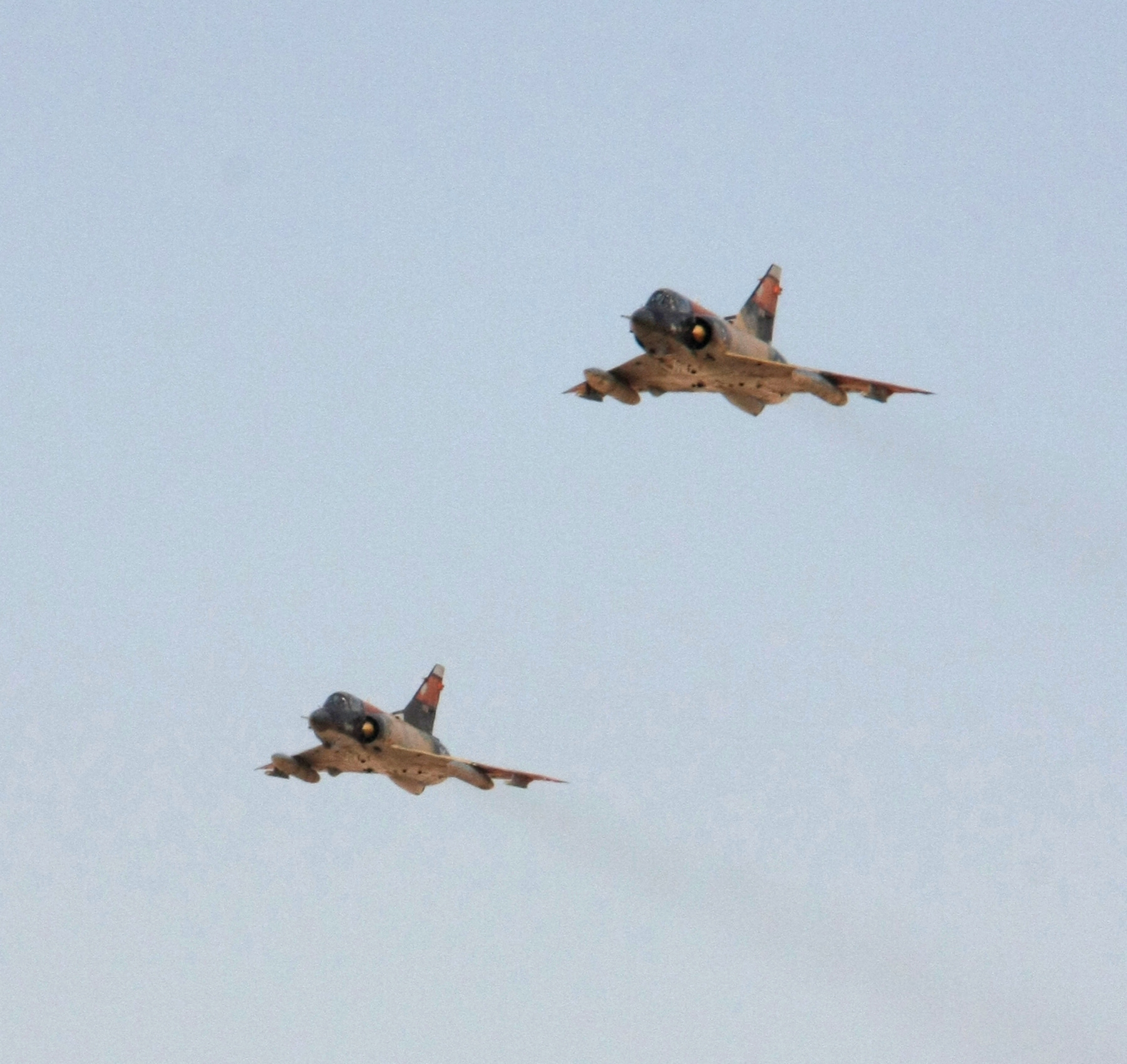
Two Egyptian Air Force Mirage 5 fighter jets during the military exercise Bright Star 2009 in Egypt.

Egyptian Air Force

- 211th Fighter Ground Attach Brigade at Jiyanklis Air Base
  - 69th Squadron
- 236th Fighter Ground Attach Brigade at the Birma Air Base (Tanta)
  - 71st Squadron
  - 73rd Squadron (with a detachment at Marsa Matruh)

Total number of aircraft delivered:

- 1S: 54 5SDE + 16 5E2 + 7 5AD + 9 5EAD
- 2S: 6 5SDD
- PR: 6 5SDR + 1 5RAD
- 4 ex-Spanish Air Force IIIDE and 4 ex-Zairian 5M bought for spares in 2006.

=== France ===
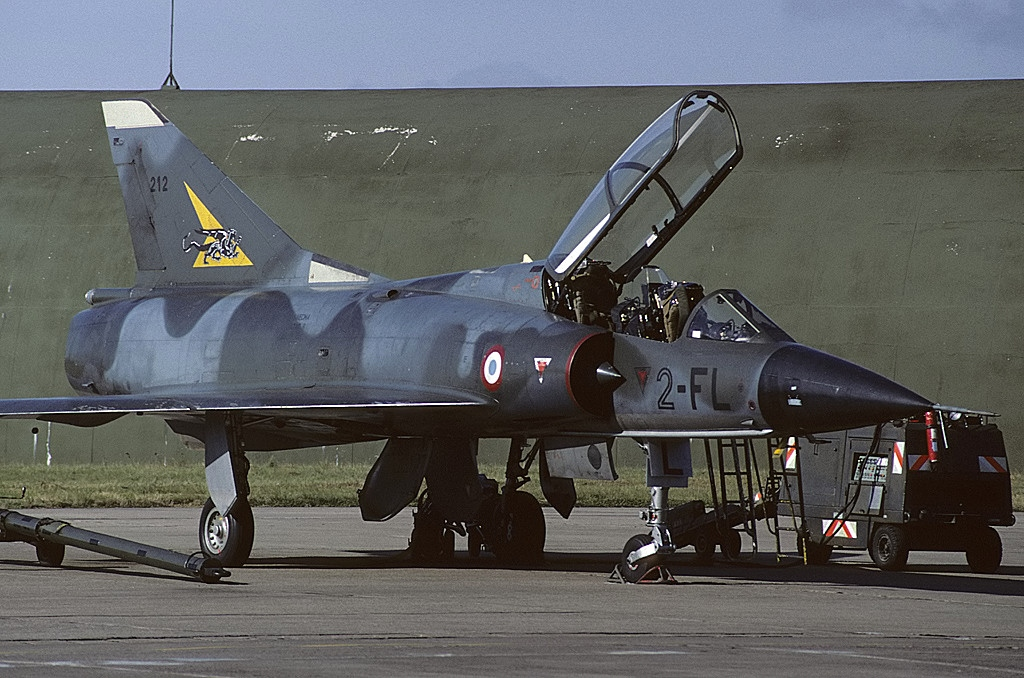
French Mirage IIIB in 1987

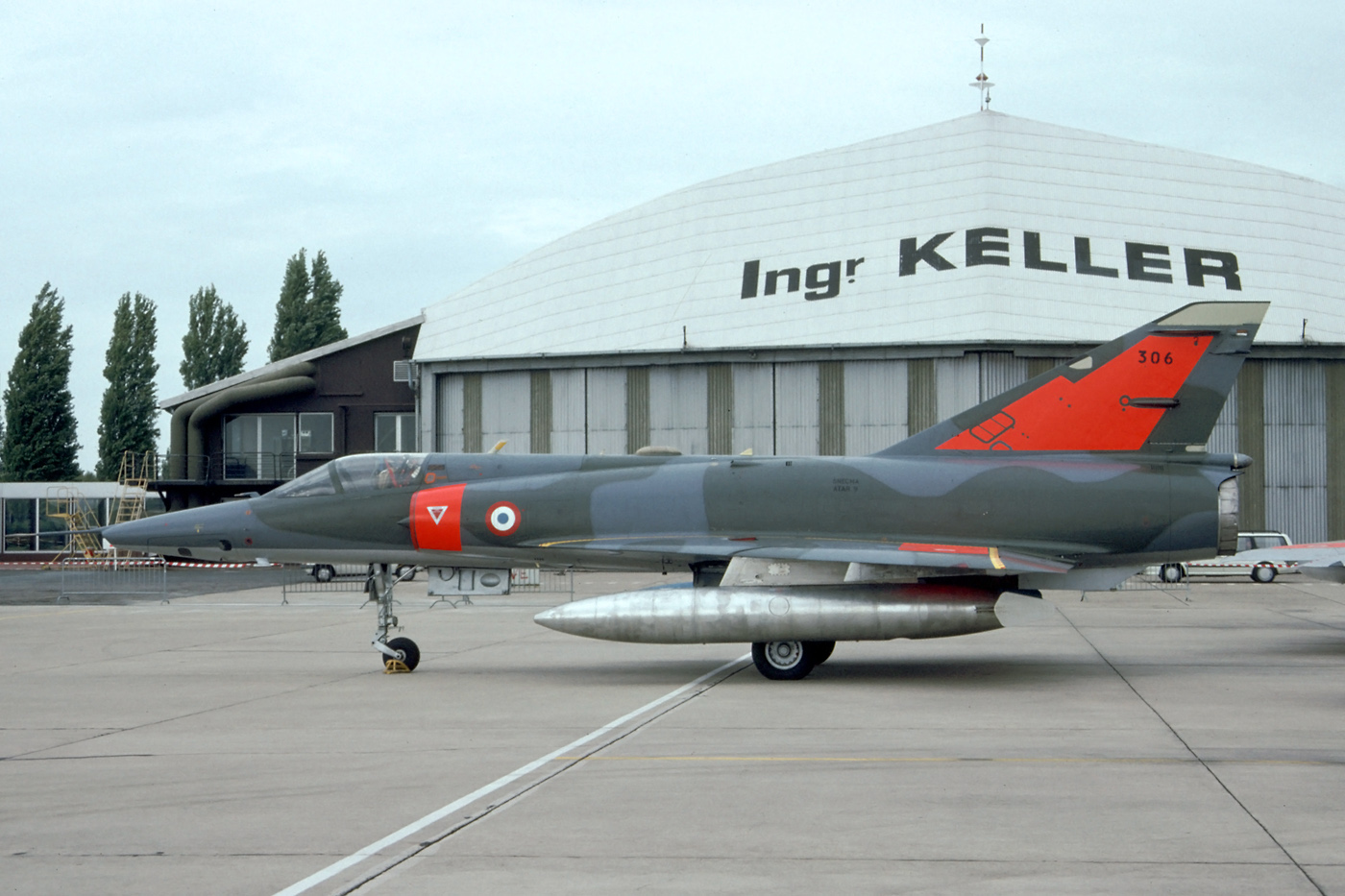
Mirage IIIR, 1992

French Air Force

- 2e Escadre de Chasse, at Base aérienne 102 Dijon-Longvic (Mirage IIIC 1961-1968, Mirage IIIB 1962-1986, Mirage IIIE 1968-1985, Mirage IIIBE 1971-1986, Mirage IIIR 1983-1986)
  - Escadron de chasse 1/2 Cigognes
  - Escadron de Chasse 2/2 Côte d'Or
  - Escadron de chasse 3/2 Alsace
- 3e Escadre de Chasse, at Base aérienne 133 Nancy-Ochey (Mirage IIIE 1965-1994, Mirage 5F 1974-1977)
  - Escadron de chasse 1/3 Navarre
  - Escadron de Chasse 2/3 Champagne
  - Escadron de chasse 3/3 Ardennes
- 4e Escadre de Chasse, at Base aérienne 116 Luxeuil-St.Sauver (Mirage IIIE 1966-1988)
  - Escadron de chasse 1/4 Dauphiné
  - Escadron de Chasse 2/4 La Fayette
- 5e Escadre de Chasse, at Base aérienne 115 Orange-Caritat (Mirage IIIC 1966-1975)
  - Escadron de chasse 1/5 Vendée
  - Escadron de Chasse 2/5 Ile-de-France
  - Escadron de chasse 3/5 Comtat Venaissin
- 13e Escadre de Chasse, at Base aérienne 132 Colmar-Meyenheim (Mirage IIIC 1965-1992, Mirage IIIB 1986-1992, Mirage IIIE 1965-1992, Mirage IIIBE 1986-1994, Mirage 5F 1972-1994)
  - Escadron de chasse 1/13 Artois
  - Escadron de Chasse 2/13 Alpes
  - Escadron de chasse 3/13 Auvergne
- 33e Escadre de Reconnaissance, at Base aérienne 124 Strasbourg-Entzheim (Mirage IIIB 1963-1965, Mirage IIIR 1963-1988, Mirage IIIRD 1968-1988)
  - Escadron de reconnaissance 1/33 Belfort
  - Escadron de Chasse 2/33 Savoie
  - Escadron de chasse 3/33 Moselle

Total number of aircraft delivered:

- 1S: 95 IIIC + 183 IIIE + 58 5F
- 2S: 27 IIIB + 5 IIIB1 + 10 IIIB2 + 20 IIIBE
- PR: 50 IIIR + 20 IIIRD

All aircraft retired.

=== Gabon ===
Gabon Air Force

- Escadron 1-02, based at Franceville/Mwengue

Total number of aircraft delivered:

- 1S: 3 5G + 4 5G2 (including 2 undelivered Zairian 5Ms)
- 2S: 2 5DG + 2 5DG2

Retired around 2006-2008, although all flying activity had already been stopped in the mid-1990s.

=== Israel ===
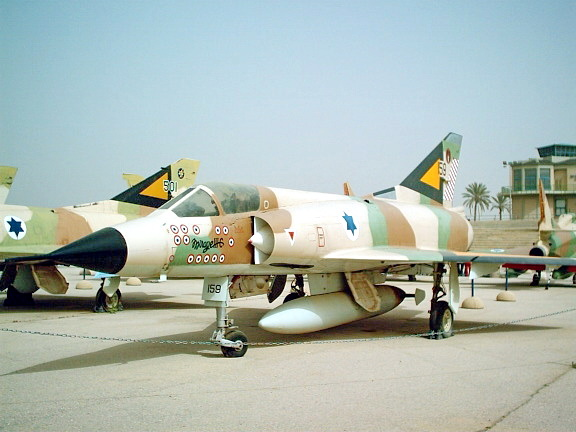
A Mirage IIICJ at the Israeli Air Force Museum

Israeli Air Force

- 101 Squadron
- 117 Squadron
- 119 Squadron
- 253 Squadron
- 254 Squadron
- 113 Squadron (Nesher only)
- 144 Squadron (Nesher only)

Total number of aircraft delivered:

- 1S: 72 IIICJ
- 2S: 4 IIIBJ
- 2 Mirage IIIRJ photo reconnaissance aircraft
- IAI assembled 60 Neshers, with 50 single-seaters and 10 two-seat Nesher Ts.

All of the aircraft are withdrawn from use. 39 Neshers, including 4 two-seaters, were transferred to Argentina between 1978 and the beginning of 1982. 19 IIICJ and 3 IIIBJ followed, between December 1982 and February 1983.

=== Lebanon ===
Lebanese Air Force

- 8th Squadron, Rayak Air Base

Total number of aircraft delivered:

- 1S: 10 IIIEL
- 2S: 2 IIIBL

Ordered in 1966, all grounded in the 1970s due to lack of funds. All surviving aircraft (9 IIIEL and 1 IIIBL) were sold to Pakistan in 2000.

=== Libya ===
Libyan Air Force

- 1010th Squadron "Jerusalem" at Mitiga International Airport (1971-1983), then Al-Watiya Air Base (1983-early 1990s), then back to Mitiga (early 1990's-2003)
- 1020th Squadron "Tira" at Mitiga (1973-1983)
- 1030th Squadron at Al-Watiya (1976-early 1990s)
- 1040th Squadron at Gamal Abdel Nasser Airbase (1976-early 1990s)

Total number of aircraft delivered:

- 1S: 53 5D + 32 5DE
- 2S: 15 5DD
- PR: 10 5DR

Most of the surviving aircraft (32 5D, 29 5DE, 12 5DD and 6 5DR) were sold to Pakistan as part of Project ROSE in 2004-2005.

=== Pakistan ===
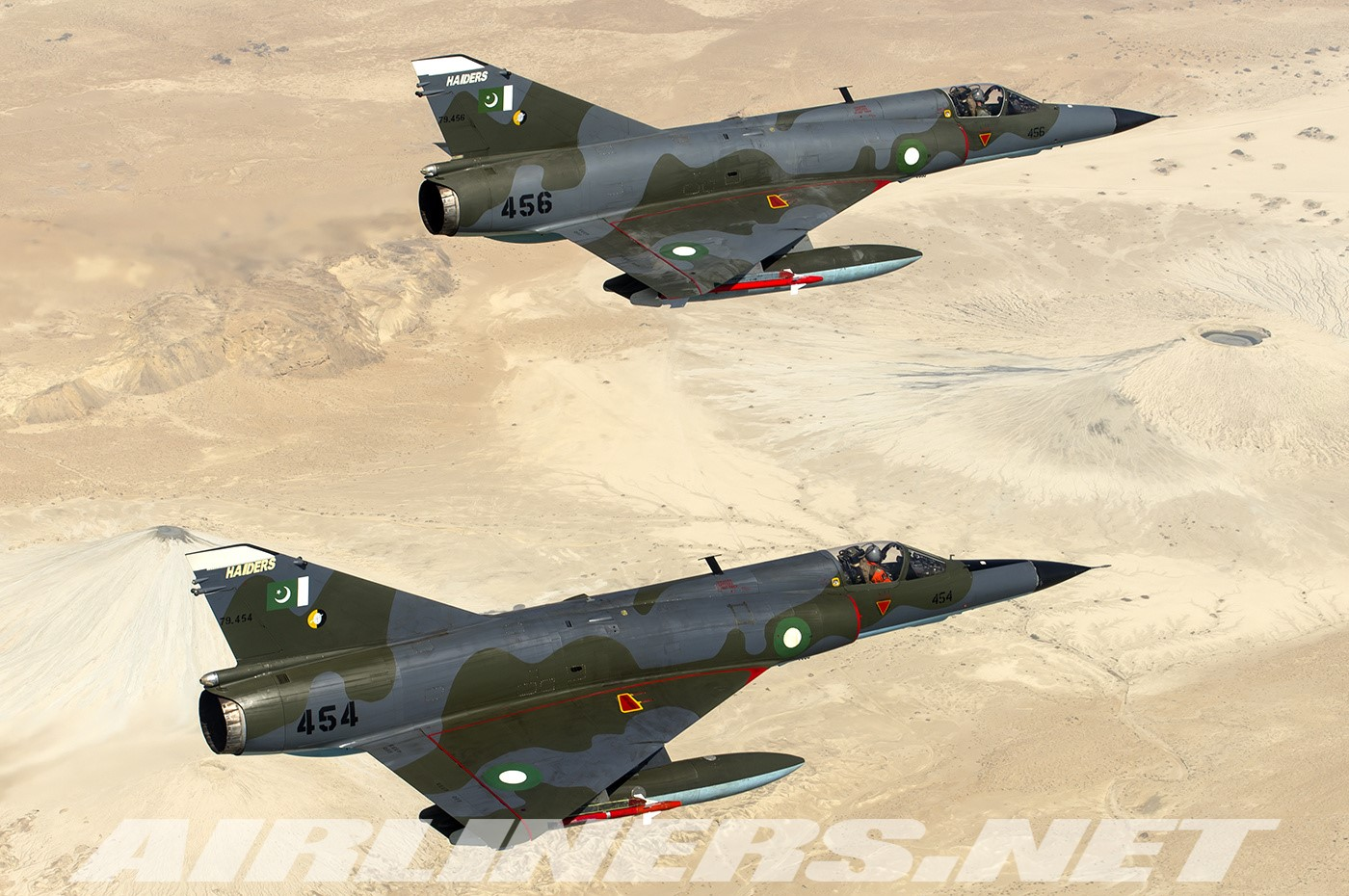
Two PAF Mirage 5PA2s in flight

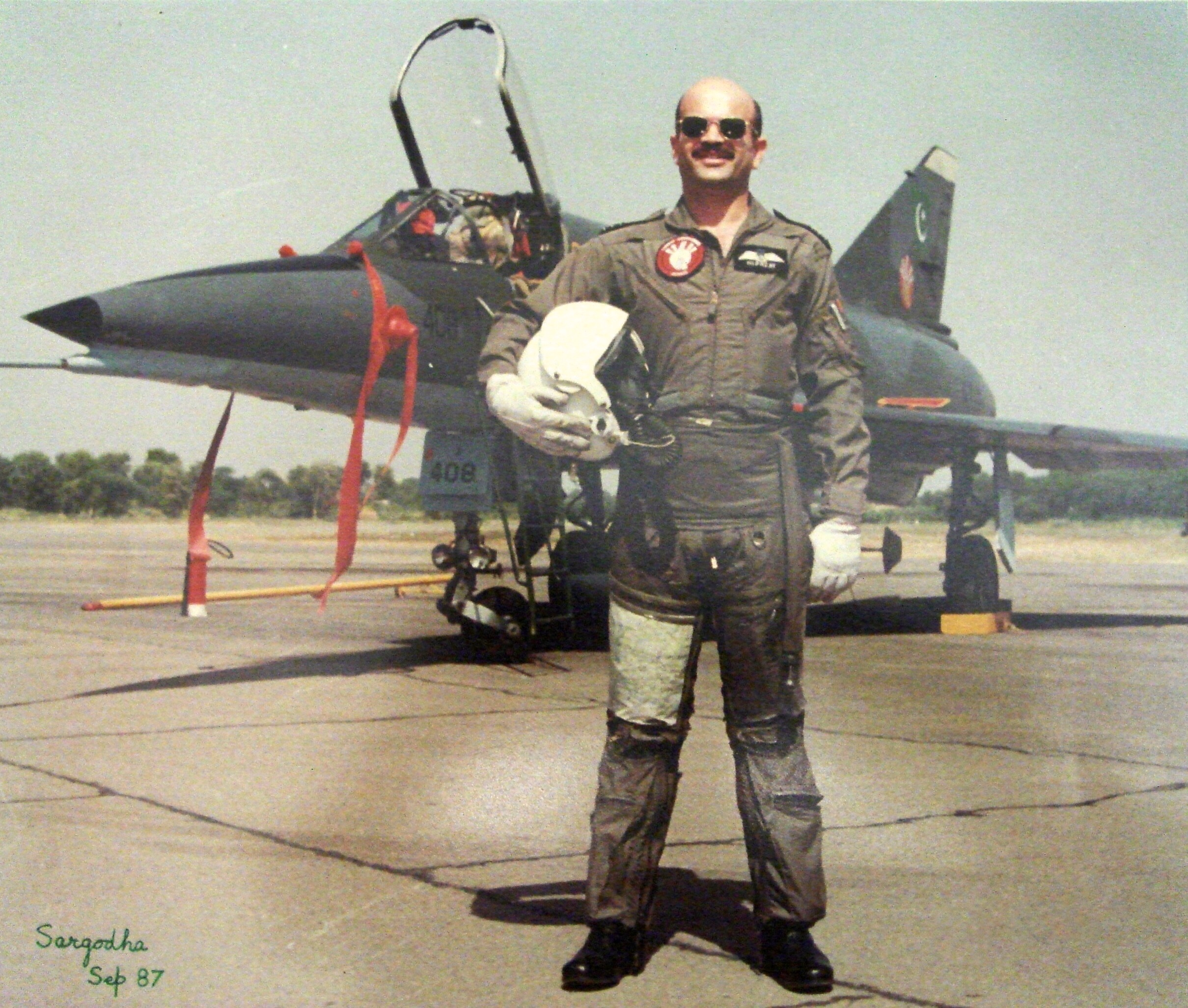
Future Air Marshal Hifazat Ullah Khan in front of a Mirage 5PA

Pakistan Air Force

- No. 7 Squadron
- No. 8 Squadron
- No. 15 Squadron
- No. 22 Squadron
- No. 25 Squadron
- No. 27 Squadron
- Combat Commanders' School

Total number of aircraft delivered:

- 1S: 18 IIIEP + 28 5PA + 18 5PA2 + 12 5PA3 + 43 IIIO + 15 IIIEE + 35 5F + 32 5D + 29 5DE
- 2S: 5 IIIDP + 2 5DPA2 + 7 IIID + 9 IIIBE + 5 IIIDE + 1 IIIEL + 12 5DD
- PR: 3 IIIRP + 10 IIIRP2 + 6 5DR

The Pakistan Air Force is the largest operator of the Dassault Mirage III/5 with a fleet strength of around 156 aircraft. The fleet consists of fighters built for Pakistan (Mirage IIIEP, IIIRP, IIIDP, IIIRP2, 5PA, 5PA2, 5PA3, 5DPA2) in the 1960s, 70s and 80s, as well as used French, Australian, Libyan, Spanish and Lebanese aircraft bought in the 1990s and early 2000s. Some 35 of the Australian-built Mirage IIIO variant were modernized with new avionics under the first stage of the ROSE (Retrofit Of Strike Element) upgrade programme to make air superiority specialized "ROSE I" fighters.

Note that some of the second-hand aircraft never flew with the PAF, being used only for spare parts or as training aids. Pakistan is capable of locally refurbishing its Mirages at the Mirage Rebuild Factory of the Pakistan Aeronautical Complex.

=== Peru ===
Peruvian Air Force

- Grupo Aéreo N°6 at the Base Aérea "Pedro Ruiz Gallo" (Chiclayo)
  - Escuadrón Aéreo N°611
  - Escuadrón Aéreo N°612

Total number of aircraft delivered:

- 1S: 22 5P + 10 5P3 + 2 5P4
- 2S: 4 5DP + 1 5DP3 + 1 5DP4

10 5P were transferred to Argentina in 1982. All of the 15 surviving aircraft were upgraded to Mirage 5P4/5DP4 standards from 1985 to 1990. Survivors stored by 2002.

=== South Africa ===
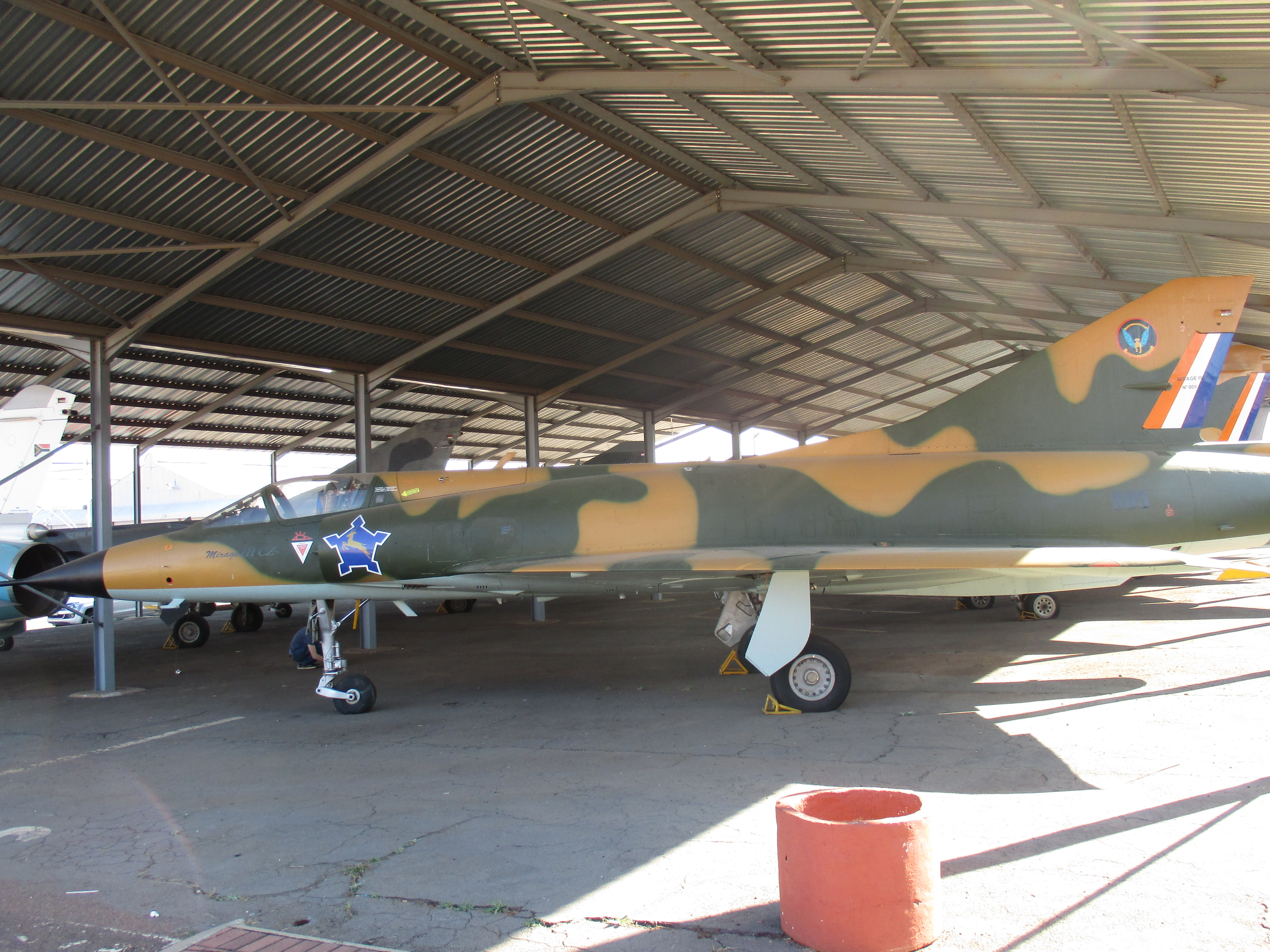
South African Mirage IIICZ.

South African Air Force

- 2 Squadron SAAF, 1963-1990
- 3 Squadron SAAF, 1966-1975
- 85 Combat Flying School SAAF, 1974-1992 (renamed 89 Combat Flying School in 1986)
  - 1S: 16 IIICZ + 17 IIIEZ

Total number of aircraft delivered:

- 2S: 3 IIIBZ + 3 IIIDZ + 11 IIID2Z
- PR: 4 IIIRZ + 4 IIIR2Z

All out of service, some having been upgraded to Cheetah standards. There were 16 Cheetah E conversions (all out of service), 16 Cheetah D conversions, and one Cheetah R conversion. Some Cheetah Es were sold to Chile for use as spare parts for Panteras.

=== Spain ===
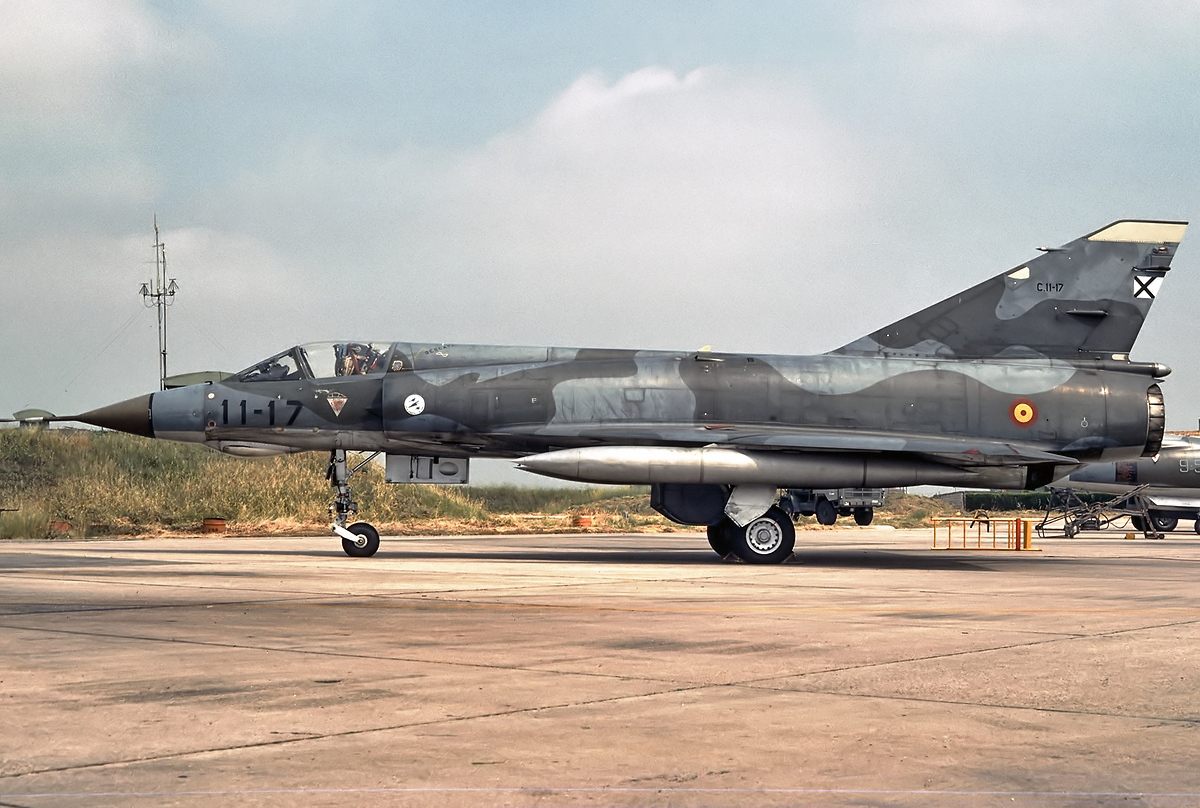
Mirage IIIEE at Grazzanise Air Base in 1990

Spanish Air Force

- Ala 11 at Manises Air Base

Total number of aircraft delivered:

- 1S: 24 C.11 (Mirage IIIEE)
- 2S: 7 CE.11 (Mirage IIIDE)

Upgrade plan (head-up display, ALE-40 decoy launchers, AIM-9L/AGM-65G capability, two extra hardpoints) cancelled in 1991. Withdrawn from service in October 1992. Some survivors (15 IIIEE and 5 IIIDE) were used as part of the payment for the Mirage F1M upgrade and later sold to Pakistan.

=== Switzerland ===
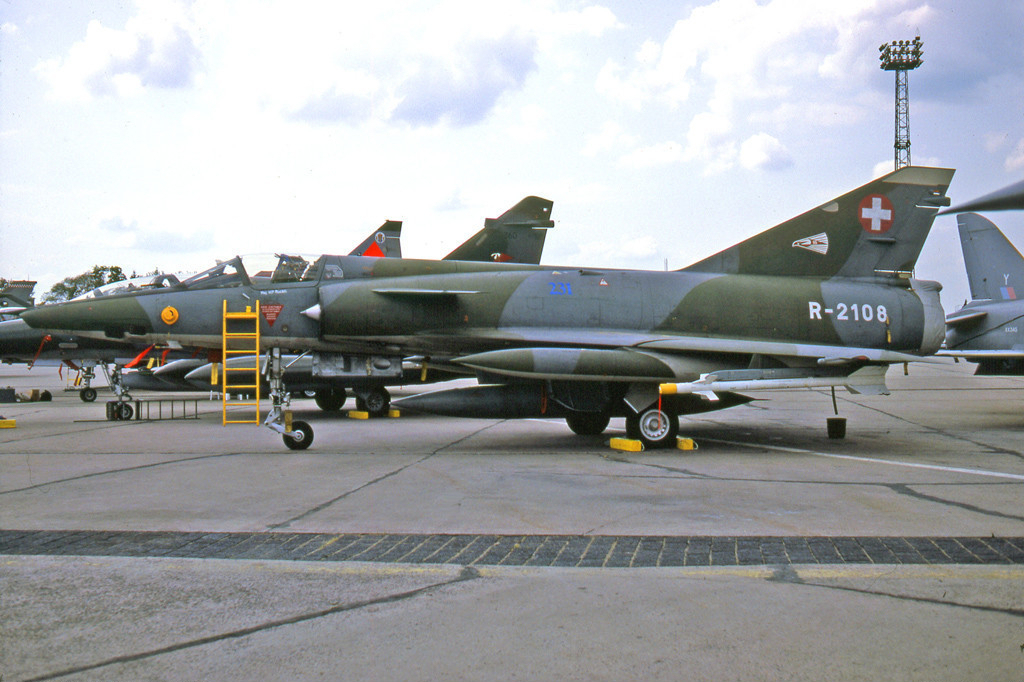
Dassault Mirage IIIRS, R-2108, Swiss Air Force

Swiss Air Force

- Fliegerstaffel 3, 1992-2001, Mirage IIIRS
- Fliegerstaffel 4, 1992-2000
- Fliegerstaffel 10, 1968-2003, Mirage IIIRS
- Fliegerstaffel 16, 1967-1999
- Fliegerstaffel 17, 1967-1997

Total number of aircraft delivered:

- 1S: 1 IIICS + 36 IIIS
- 2S: 3 IIIBS + 2 IIIDS
- PR: 18 IIIRS

Most built locally, many upgraded with canards, optics etc. Withdrawn from service in 2003 (Mirage IIIRS). One Mirage IIIDS (J-2012, civilian immatriculation HB-RDF) flew passengers until May 25th of 2023 when it was retired.

=== Venezuela ===
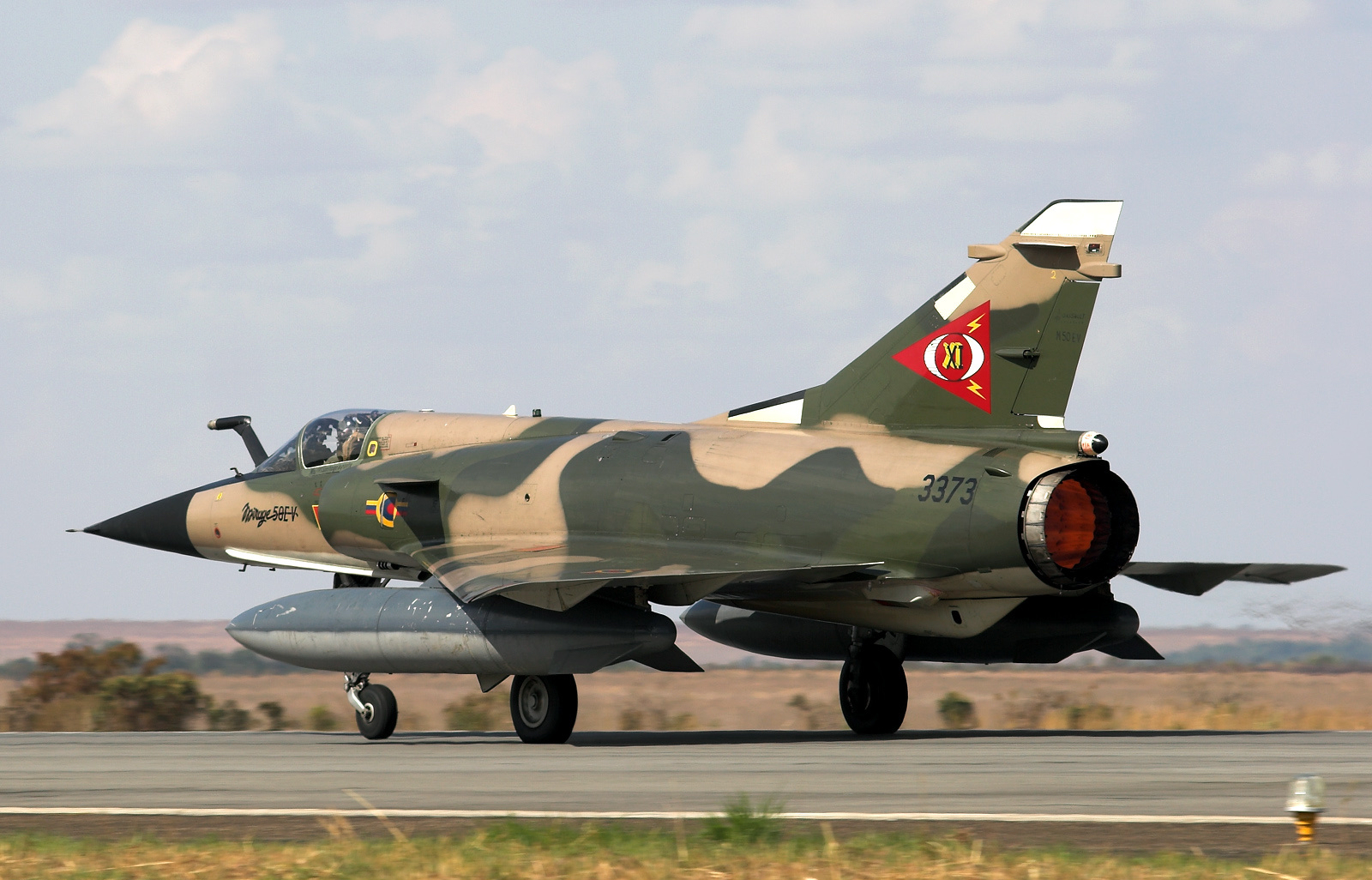
Dassault Mirage 50EV in 2006

Venezuelan Air Force

- Grupo Aéreo de Caza 11 “Los Diablos” at the Base Area El Libertador in Palo Negro
  - Escuadrón 33 “Halcones”
  - Escuadrón 34 “Caciques”

Total number of aircraft delivered:

- 1S: 7 IIIEV (2 modernized to Mirage 50EV standards) + 6 5V (2 modernized to Mirage 50EV and 1 to Mirage 50DV standards) + 9 50EV (6 new-build and 3 modified ex-Zairian Mirage 5M)
- 2S: 3 5DV (1 modernized to Mirage 50DV standards) + 1 50DV (new-build)

All of the surviving Mirage III/5s were modernized into Mirage 50s. The last Mirage 50s were retired from service in November 2009. Six of them were donated to Ecuador.

=== Zaire ===
Zairean Air Force

- 2e Groupement Aérien Tactique at Kamina Air Base

Total number of aircraft delivered:

- 1S: 14 5M (only 11 delivered)
- 2S: 3 5DM (former IIIBE, all delivered)

The three undelivered Mirage 5Ms were bought back by Dassault in 1979. Four more followed in 1983. Of these, one became the first Egyptian Mirage 5E2, two were transformed into Mirage 5G2s for Gabon, three were rebuilt into Mirage 50EVs for Venezuela, and one served as a source of spares at Dassault's Biarritz facility. In 1989, the six last surviving aircraft were brought back to France. Of these, two Mirage 5DMs were sold to Brazil in 1996, and four Mirage 5Ms went to Egypt in 2006.

== See also ==
- Dassault Mirage III
- Dassault Mirage 5
