= Fliegerstaffel 10 =

Fliegerstaffel 10 10ème Escadrille Squadriglia d'aviazione 10
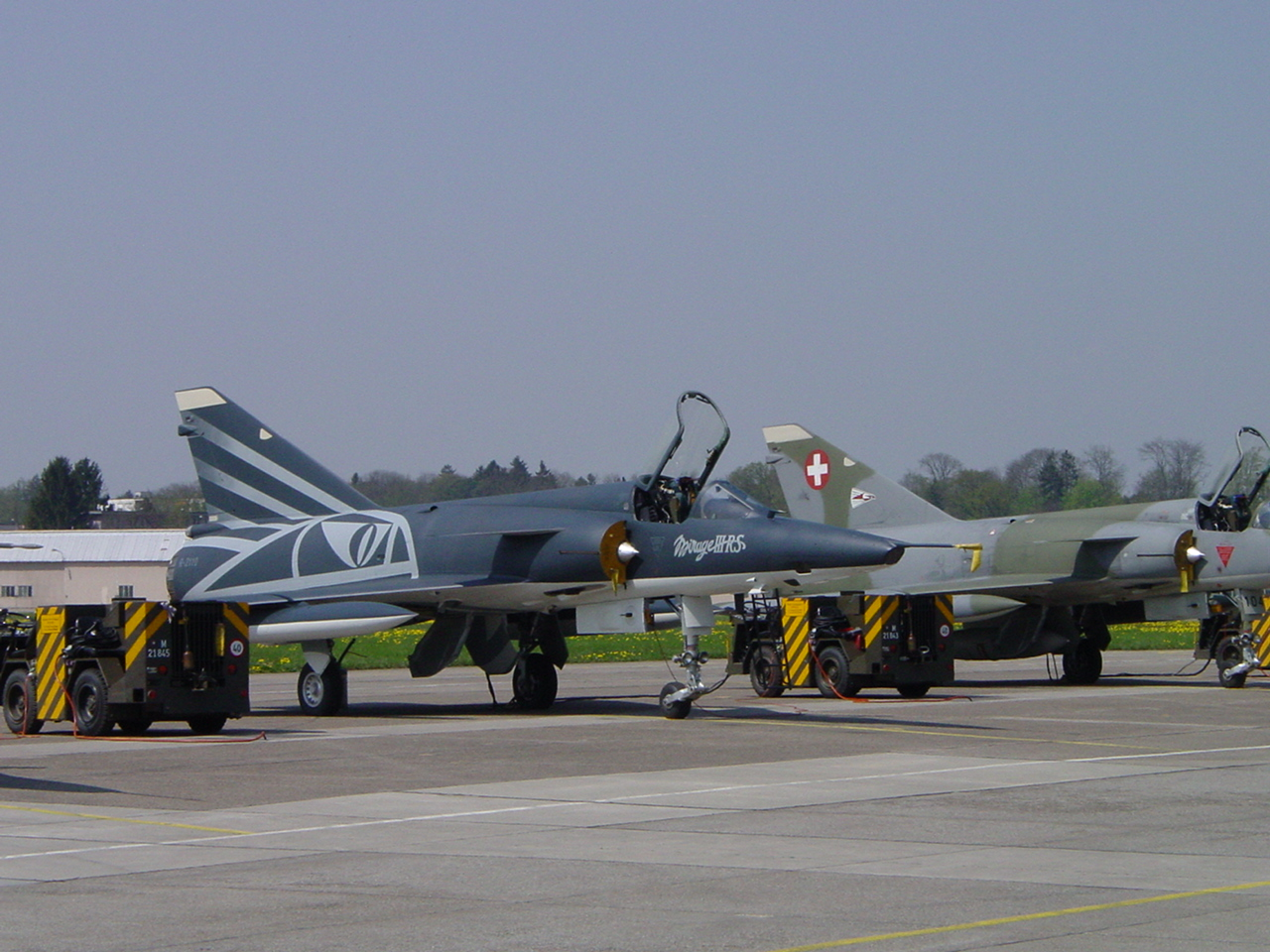
- Black MirageIIIRS of Fliegerstaffel 10
- Active: 1935-2003
- Country: Switzerland
- Branch: Swiss Air Force
- Role: Recon squadron
- Garrison/HQ: Military Airfield at Buoch

Fliegerstaffel 10 (No. 10Squadron) was a Swiss Air Force unit consisting of professional military pilots belonging to the Überwachungsgeschwader. Their home base at the dissolution was the Military Airfield at Buochs, where it was equipped with Mirage IIIRS .

== Badge ==
Fliegerstaffel 10's coat of arms was the AMIR badge (AMIR = Aufklärer Mirage (reconnaissance Mirage)). This badge shows on a white ground a falcon head drawn with black lines, the neck of which is filled with blue color. The beak rises above the round badge, above the head of the falcon is a number 10 in red. Except for the number 10, the badge is identical to the AMIR badge of the Fliegerstaffel 3 and the Fliegerstaffel 4 (they had a number 3 resp. 4 In the badge).

== History ==
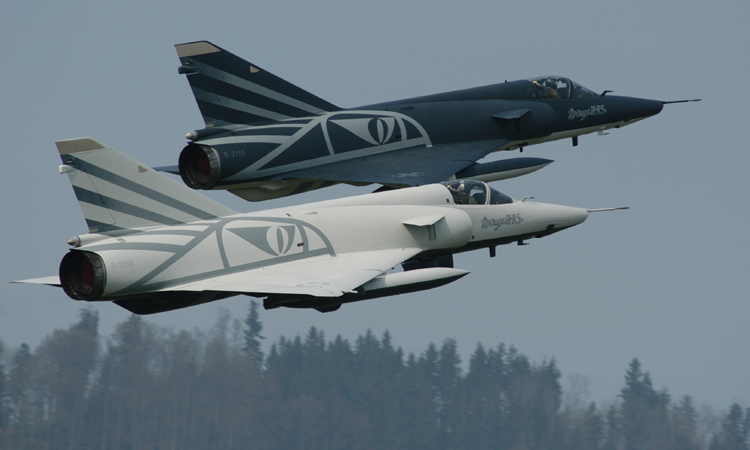
Black & with MirageIIIRS R-2110 R-2116

The then Fliegerkompanie 10 was founded in 1935. From 1938 to 1940 Fliegerkompanie 10 used the Fokker C.V.

On 27 August 1938 five Fokker C.V. aircraft were on their way from Dübendorf to Lugano. While in the Muotatal area the group experienced bad weather; only one of the five survived. The other four smashed, killing seven crew members.

From 1940 to 1942, C-35 type aircraft were used followed by the C-3603 aircraft from 1942 to 1952. From 1952 to 1954, the now Fliegerstaffel 10, formed as a "pilots-only" unit, used the D-3801 Morane.

In 1954 the De Havilland Venom DH-112 Mk1 R arrived and stayed in service until 1967. In 1956 the air reconnaissance formation was founded. The air reconnaissance formation used a DH-100 Vampire, six C-3603 and six camera-equipped P-51D Mustangs.

In 1963, the Aufklärerstaffel 10 was formally established. Existing aircraft were replaced by De Havilland D.H. 112 Mk. 1 R Venom. The aircraft had been optimized for air reconnaissance and remained in service until 1967.

From 1968 on, the Fliegerstaffel 10 operated the supersonic reconnaissance aircraft Mirage IIIRS AMIR. The home base became the Military Airfield Buochs. Various groups merged into the Aufklärerstaffel 10; Aufklärererstaffel 4 (2000); Aufklärererstaffel 3 (2002).

In 2003, the Aufklärerstaffel / Fliegerstaffel 10 was disbanded on Buoch's military airfield, after the last course of service. On this occasion, the two aircraft R-2110 and R-2116 received a contrasting black and white finish, with the AMIR-Falcon, the black and white color symbolizing the black / white photos made by these reconnaissance machines. On December 17, 2003, the last landing of the Mirage IIIRS R-2118 in Dübendorf by Markus "Zurigo" Zürcher, the commander of the Fliegerstaffel 10. This marked the ending of Fliegerstaffel 10. The aircraft remained in the Flieger-Flab-Museum in Dübendorf.

== Airplanes ==
- Fokker CV
- C-36
- C-3603
- Morane D-3801
- de Havilland Vampire
- de Havilland Venom R
- P-51D Mustang
- Dassault Mirage III RS

== Bibliography ==
- Lewis, Peter (2019). "Where Falcons Dare: The Mirage IIIRS & Fliegerstaffel 10". The Aviation Historian (28): 40–51. ISSN 2051-1930.
