= Fliegerstaffel 16 =

Fliegerstaffel 16 16ème Escadrille Squadriglia d'aviazione 16
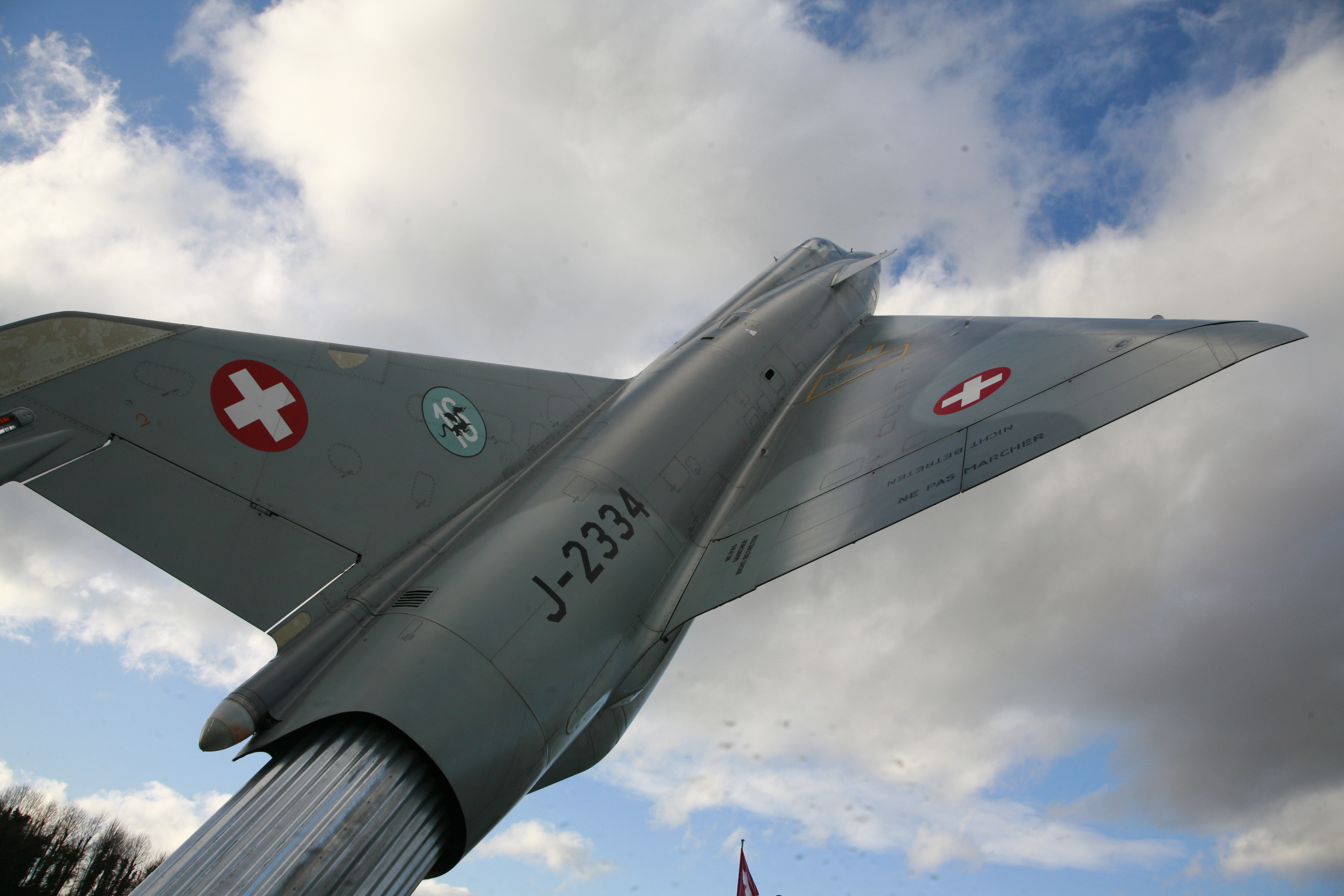
- Mirage IIIS with the old insignia of Fliegerstaffel 16
- Active: 1927-2002
- Country: Switzerland
- Branch: Swiss Air Force
- Role: Fighter squadron conversion training squadron
- Garrison/HQ: Sion Airport

The Fliegerstaffel 16 (Fightersquadron 16) of the Swiss Air Force was last equipped with Northrop F-5 F aircraft. Their home base was Sion Airport. The Fliegerstaffel 16 had a shield-shaped coat of arms showing the side view of a black dragon with a red eye, red claws, and a red firebeam in front of the white digit 16 and a dark blue background. The old badge was the same, but in round design.

== History ==
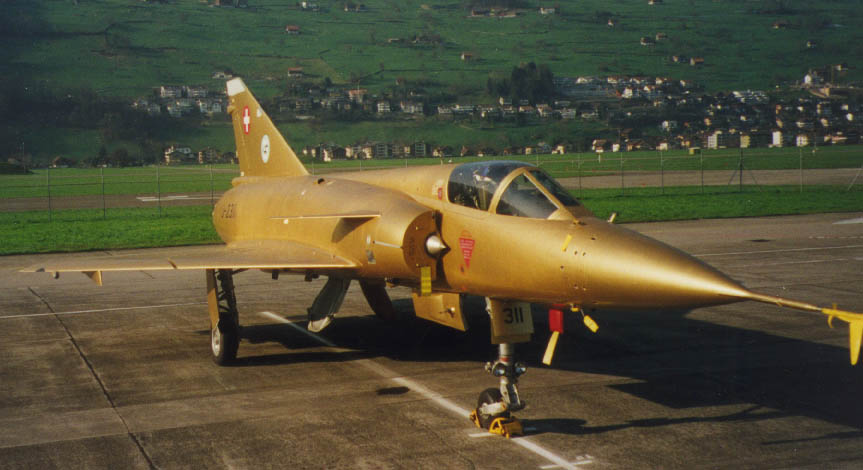
Golden Mirage IIIS J-2311 with the insignia of the Fliegerstaffel 16

The squadron was founded on January 1, 1927 as a Pilot Squadron 16 with Fokker D-Vll aircraft. From 1929 on, the Dewoitine D-9 C-1, the Dewoitine D-19 C-1, the Dewoitine D-27 and the Häfeli DH-5 were used. These aircraft were replaced by the Fokker CV in 1938, and from the year 1940 on there were only C-35 aircraft in the fliegerstaffel 16. In 1942 the conversion to the C-3603 was carried out and 1945 changed the designation into Fliegerstaffel 16. 1951 was the retraining to the P-51 Mustang. The P-51 was replaced 1952 by the first jet aircraft De Havilland DH-100 Vampire. But as early as 1953 the change to the De Havilland DH-112 Venom took place. Reconnaissance tasks was done from the Fliegerstaffel 16 from 1961 on with the De Havilland DH-112 MK 1 R Venom.

From 1968 to 1999, the Fliegerstaffel 16 used the Dassault Mirage III S from Military Airfield Buochs. The J-2311 received in 1999, do the passing out of this aircraft type from service in the Swiss air force, a golden painting . This machine was scrapped before 2003 in Buochs.

From the year 2000 until the year 2002, the Fliegerstaffel 16 used the F-5E Tiger and was stationed on the Payerne Air Base. After the BAE Hawk were taken out of service and the Pilatus PC-21 not yet in service the Fliegerstaffel 16 filled the gap for the training of future F/A-18 pilots with F-5F at Sion Airport. With the introduction of the PC-21 at the Pilotenschule in Emmen, the Fliegerstaffel 16 was disbanded in 2007.

== Airplanes ==
- Fokker D-Vll
- Dewoitine D-9 C-1
- Dewoitine D-19 C-1
- Dewoitine D-27
- Häfeli DH-5
- Fokker CV
- EKW C-35
- C-3603
- P-51 Mustang
- de Havilland Vampire
- de Havilland Venom
- de Havilland VenomR
- Mirage IIIS
- Northrop F-5E
- Northrop F-5F
