= Fliegerstaffel 3 =

Fliegerstaffel 3 3ème Escadrille Squadriglia d'aviazione 3
- Active: in Second World War-2002
- Country: Switzerland
- Branch: Swiss Air Force
- Role: Recon squadron
- Garrison/HQ: Sion Airport

Fliegerstaffel 3 (No. 3 Squadron) of the Swiss Air Force belonged to the Überwachungsgeschwader, thus professional military pilots were grouped in the unit. Their home base on disbandment was Sion and the aircraft flown were the Mirage III RS. Fliegerstaffel 3 carried the AMIR badge (AMIR = Aufklärer Mirage (reconnaissance Mirage)) as their coat of arms. This badge shows a falcon head drawn in black lines on white ground, the neck of which is filled with blue color. The beak rises above the round badge, above the head of the falcon is the red number 3. Except for the number 3, the badge is identical to the AMIR badge of Fliegerstaffel 10 and Fliegerstaffel 4 (they had a number 10 resp. 4 In the badge).

== History ==
The founding of the then Fliegerkompanie 3 took place in the Second World War with Dewoitine D-27 aircraft. These were replaced in 1944 by C-3603, which remained their aircraft until 1952. In 1945, during a reorganization, the Flying Staff of Fliegerkompanie 3 was transferred to the newly created Fliegerstaffel 3. From 1952 to 1954, Fliegerstaffel 3 used Morane D-3800 and Morane D-3801 aircraft. From 1954 to 1980 the Fliegerstaffel 3 was using De Havilland D.H. 112 Venom. In 1980 the Hawker Hunter became their aircraft used and Ambri Airfield became the home base of Fliegerstaffel 3. The Hawker Hunter abolished in 1991, the Fliegerstaffel 3 was temporarily disbanded. In 1992 the squadron was reactivated using Mirage IIIRS and the new home base was the military airfield Sion. At that time Fliegerstaffel 3 changed to the AMIR badge. The original badge was a red equilateral triangle with white outer edges. In this badge was the head of a white Bulldog with black spot over the right eye and black collar. Underneath “3ème ESCADRILLE” was written in black. This badge was followed by a round blue insignia with a yellow outline, showing a flying yellow goose and a yellow number 3 in the upper right part of the badge. This was replaced by the already mentioned AMIR badge. In 2002, Fliegerstaffel 3 was disbanded, respectively integrated into the Aufklärungserstaffel 10.

== Airplanes ==
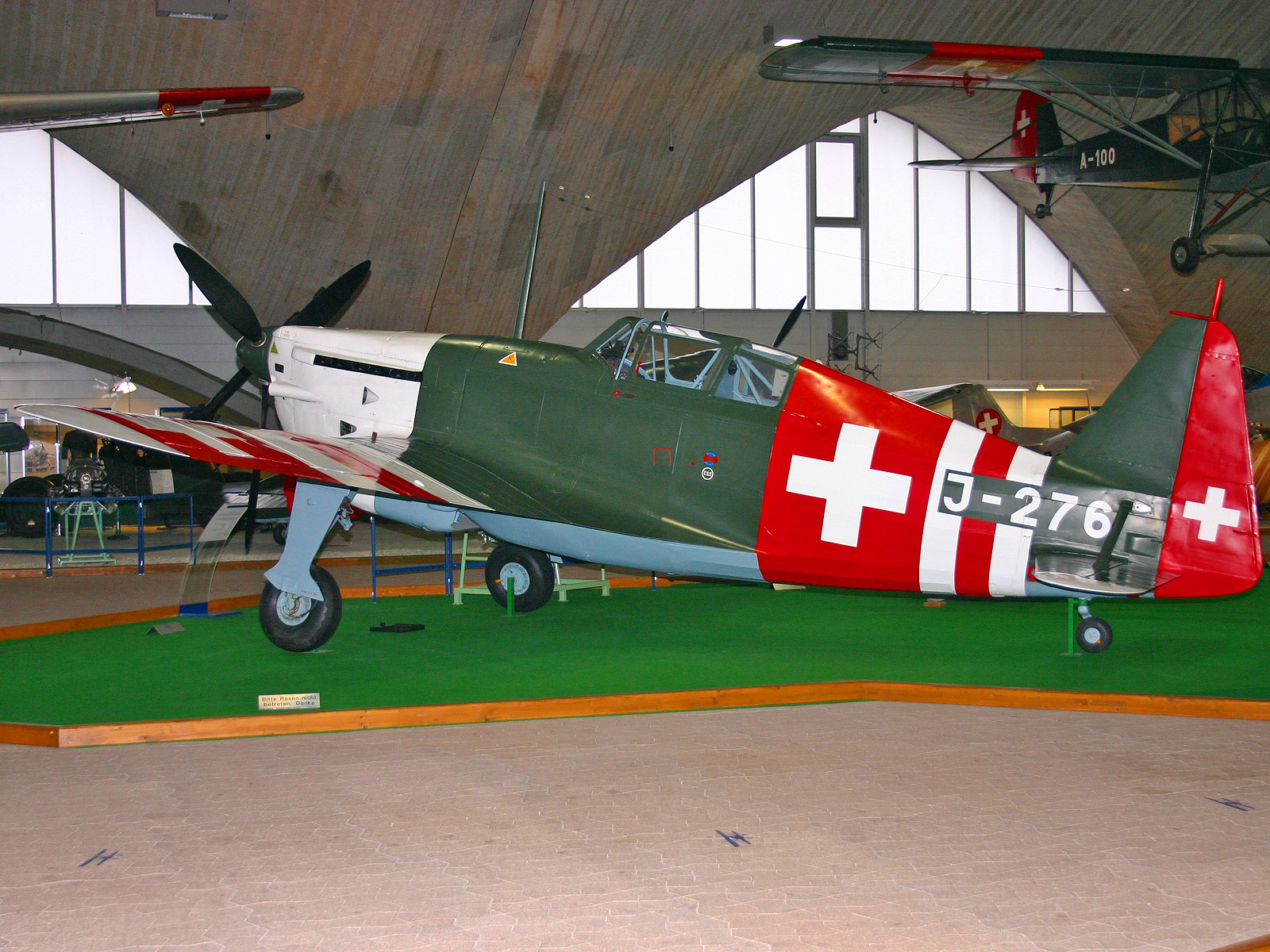
Morane D-3800

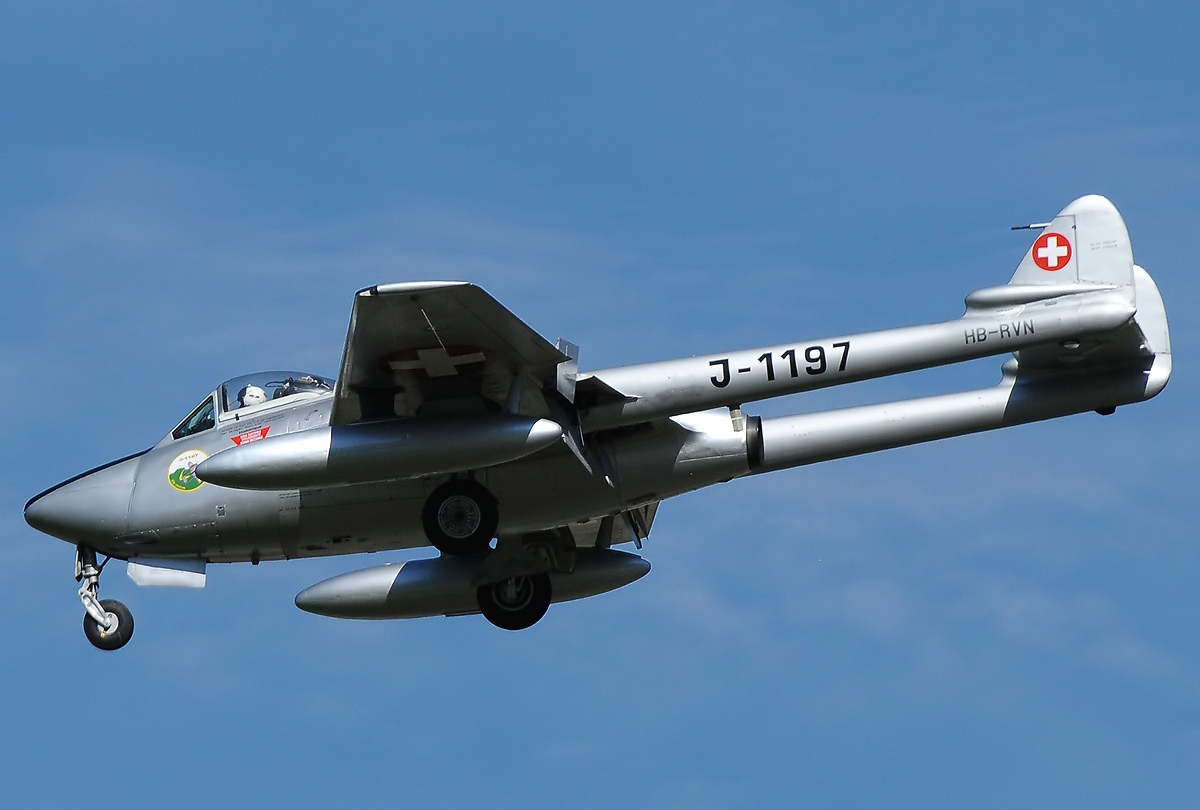
de Havilland Vampire

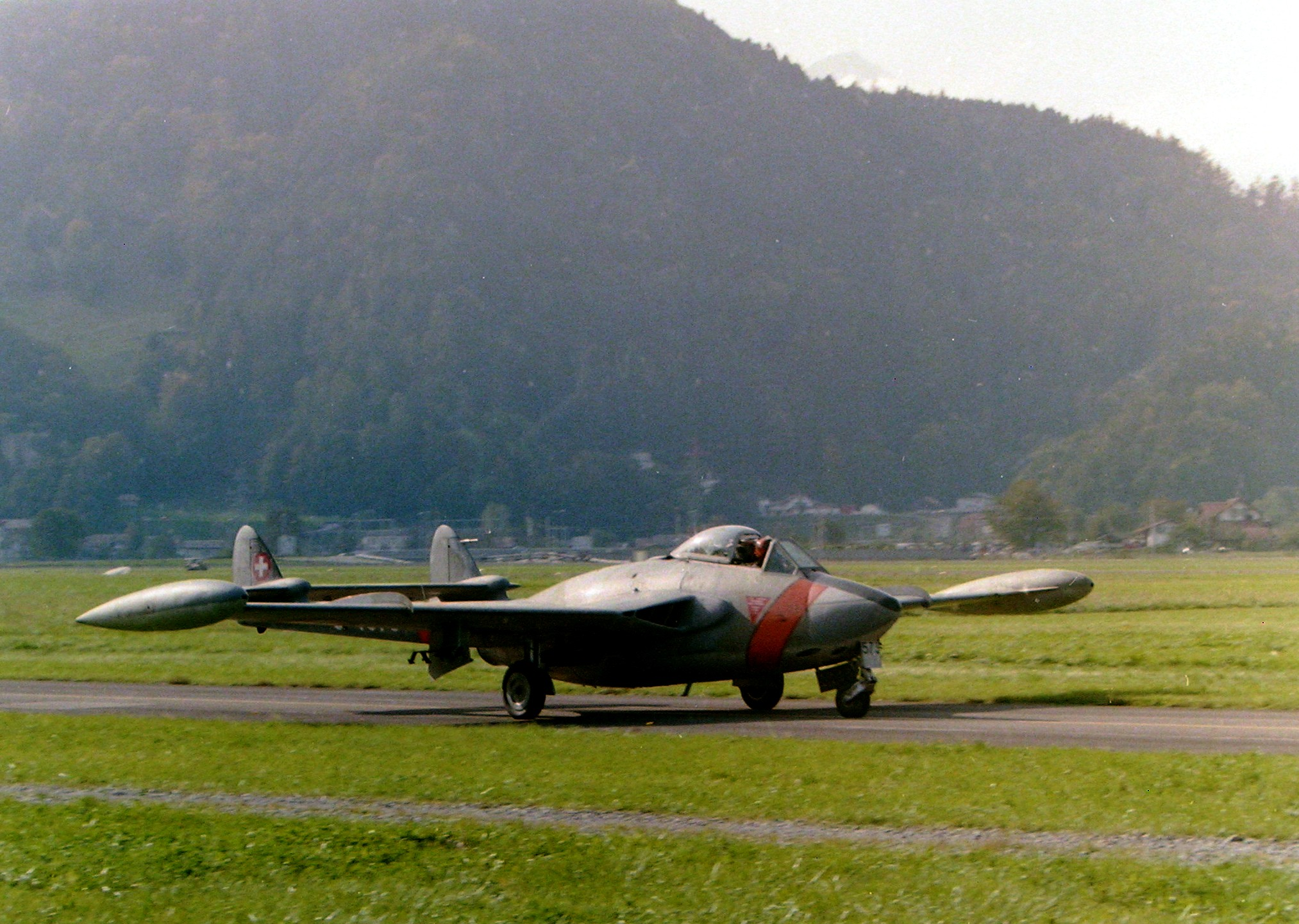
de Havilland Venom

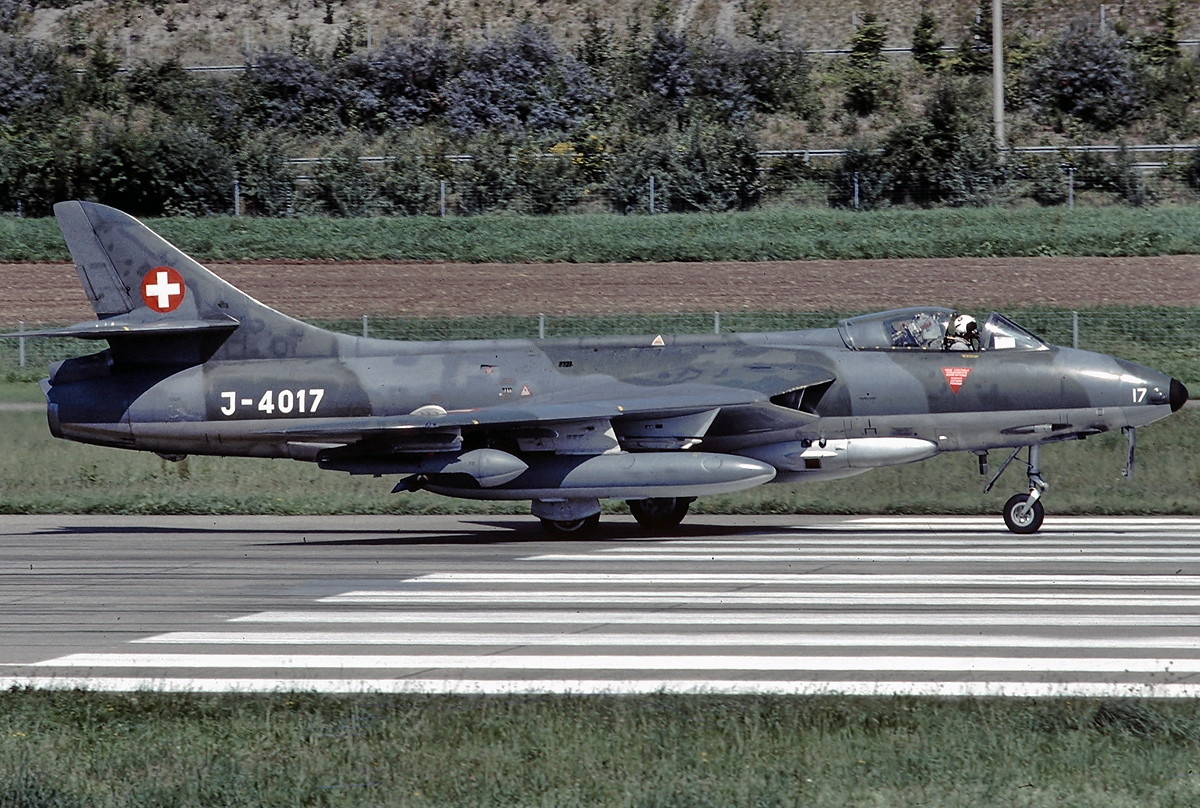
Hawker Hunter

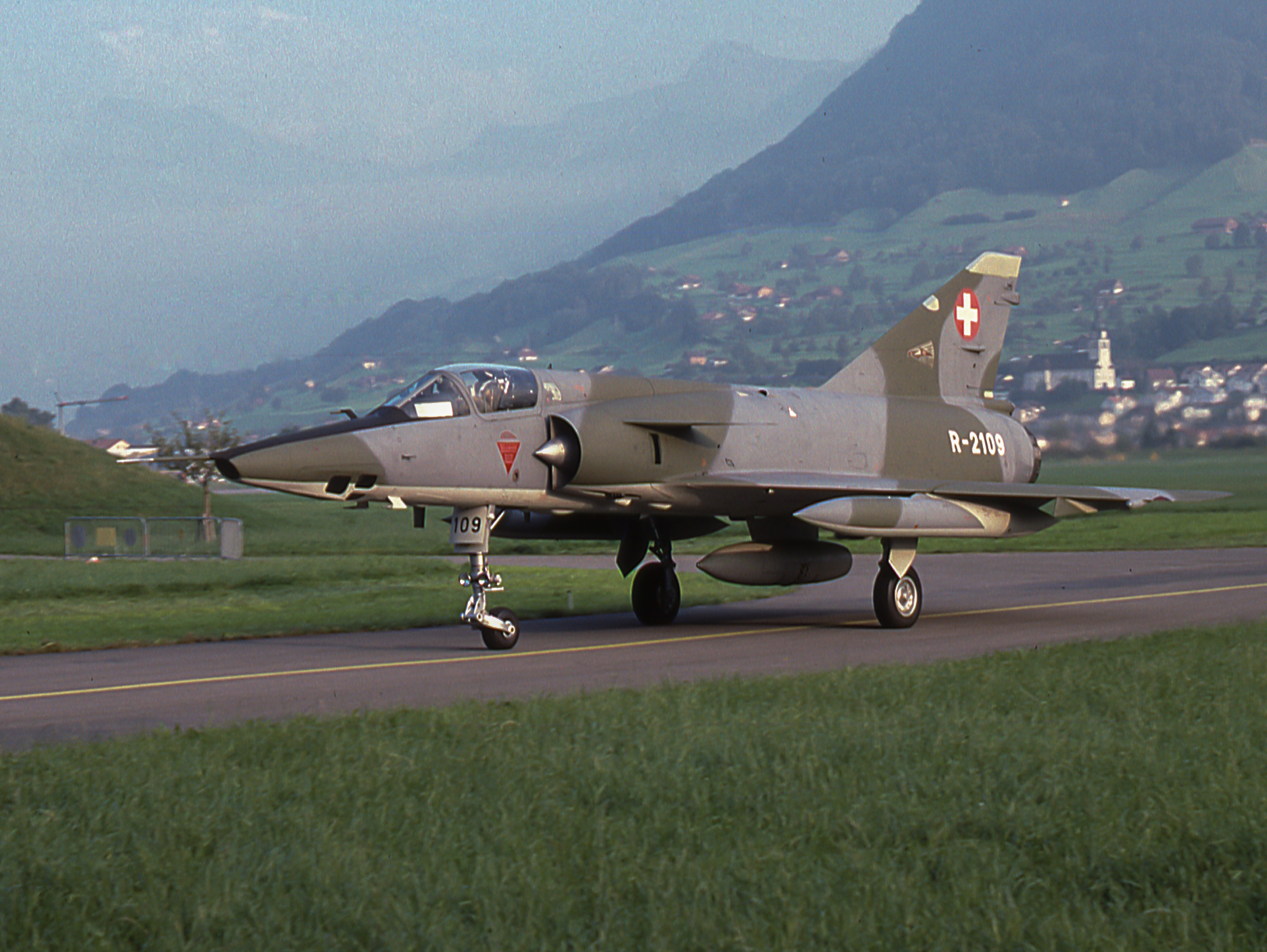
Dassault Mirage IIIRS
