= Fliegerstaffel 4 =

Fliegerstaffel 4 4ème Escadrille Squadriglia d'aviazione 4
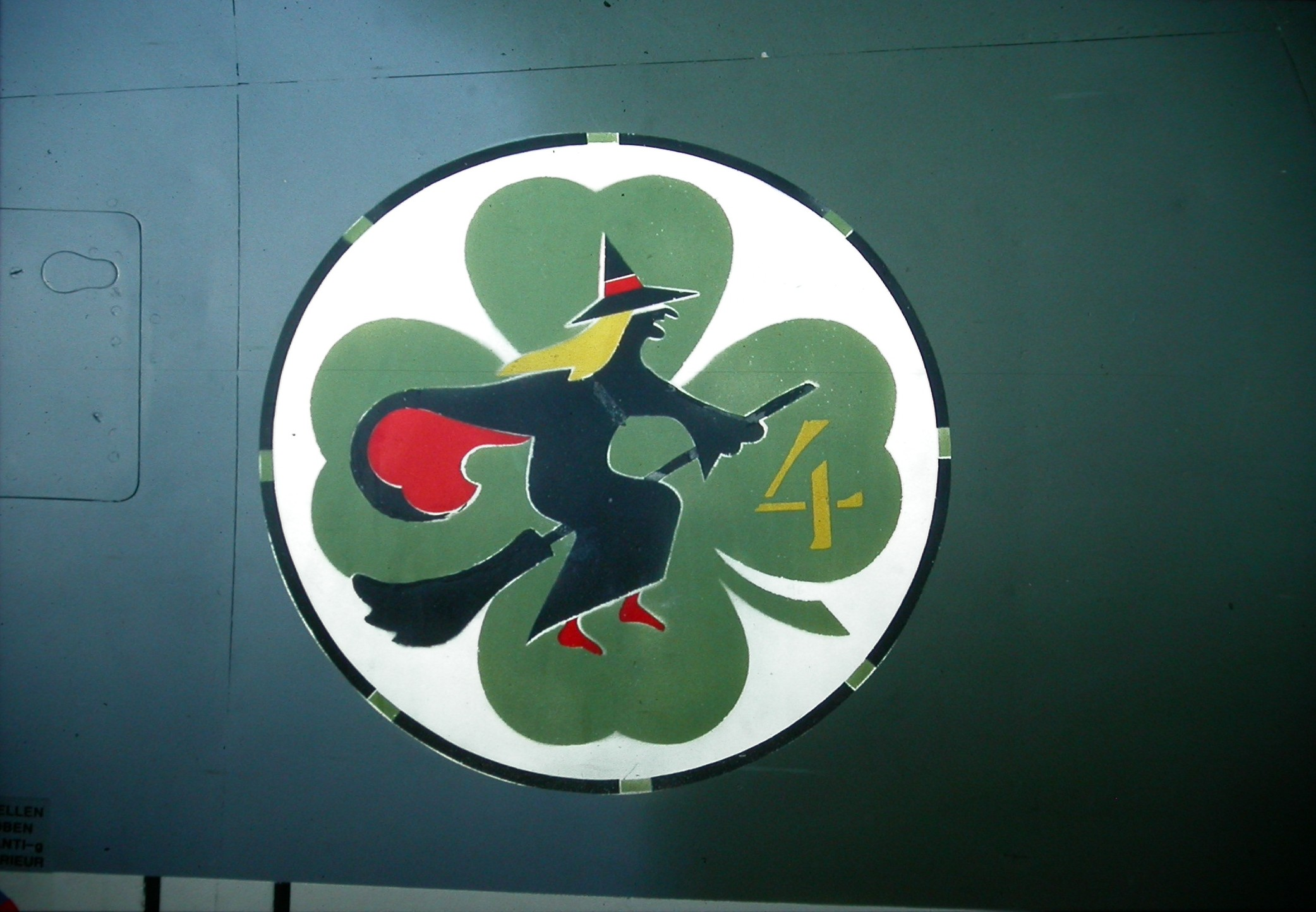
- squadron emblem Fliegerstaffel 4
- Active: 1940–2000
- Country: Switzerland
- Branch: Swiss Air Force
- Role: Recon squadron
- Garrison/HQ: Payerne Air Base

Fliegerstaffel 4 (Squadron 4) was a Swiss Air Force squadron belonging to the Überwachungsgeschwader (Surveillance Wing). It was crewed by military pilots who belonged to the Berufsfliegerkorps. Its home base at dissolution was Payerne Air Base, and Fliegerstaffel 4 was equipped with the Mirage IIIRS. Fliegerstaffel 4 carried the AMIR badge (AMIR = Aufklärer Mirage [reconnaissance Mirage]) as its coat of arms. This badge features a falcon head drawn with black lines on a white background, with the neck filled with blue. The beak rises above the round badge; above the head of the falcon is the red number 4. Except for this number, the badge is identical to the AMIR badges of Fliegerstaffel 10 and Fliegerstaffel 3, which featured the numbers 10 and 3, respectively.

== History ==
It was founded during the Second World War under the designation Fliegerkompanie 4. Starting in 1940, the company used four Morane aircraft. From 1943 onward, Fliegerkompanie 4 was stationed at Frutigen military airfield. In 1945, during a reorganization, the flying personnel of Fliegerkompanie 4 formed the newly created Fliegerstaffel 4. From 1954 onwards, Fliegerstaffel 4 transitioned to the de Havilland D.H. 100 Vampire and de Havilland DH-112 Venom. St. Stephan Military Airfield became the new home base of Fliegerstaffel 4. In 1975, the Hawker Hunter became the new aircraft of Fliegerstaffel 4, and Turtmann military airfield became its new home base. Fliegerstaffel 4 transferred its Hawker Hunters to other squadrons in 1991 and was temporarily disbanded. In 1992, it was reactivated and renamed Aufklärungsstaffel 4. Mirage IIIRS aircraft were introduced, and Payerne Air Base became the new home base. During this time, the squadron badge also changed to the AMIR badge.

In 2000, Aufklärungsstaffel 4 (Reconnaissance Squadron 4) was disbanded and integrated into Fliegerstaffel 10.

== Reconnaissance role ==
During its final years, Fliegerstaffel 4 operated the Dassault Mirage IIIRS, a reconnaissance variant of the Mirage III used by the Swiss Air Force. The designation "RS" stood for *Reconnaissance Suisse*, and the aircraft was designed for aerial reconnaissance missions. Switzerland operated 18 Mirage IIIRS aircraft, which remained in service until 2003, after the squadron had been disbanded in 2000.

== Airplanes ==
- Morane D-3801
- de Havilland Vampire
- de Havilland Venom
- Hawker Hunter
- Dassault Mirage IIIRS
