= Military police vehicle =

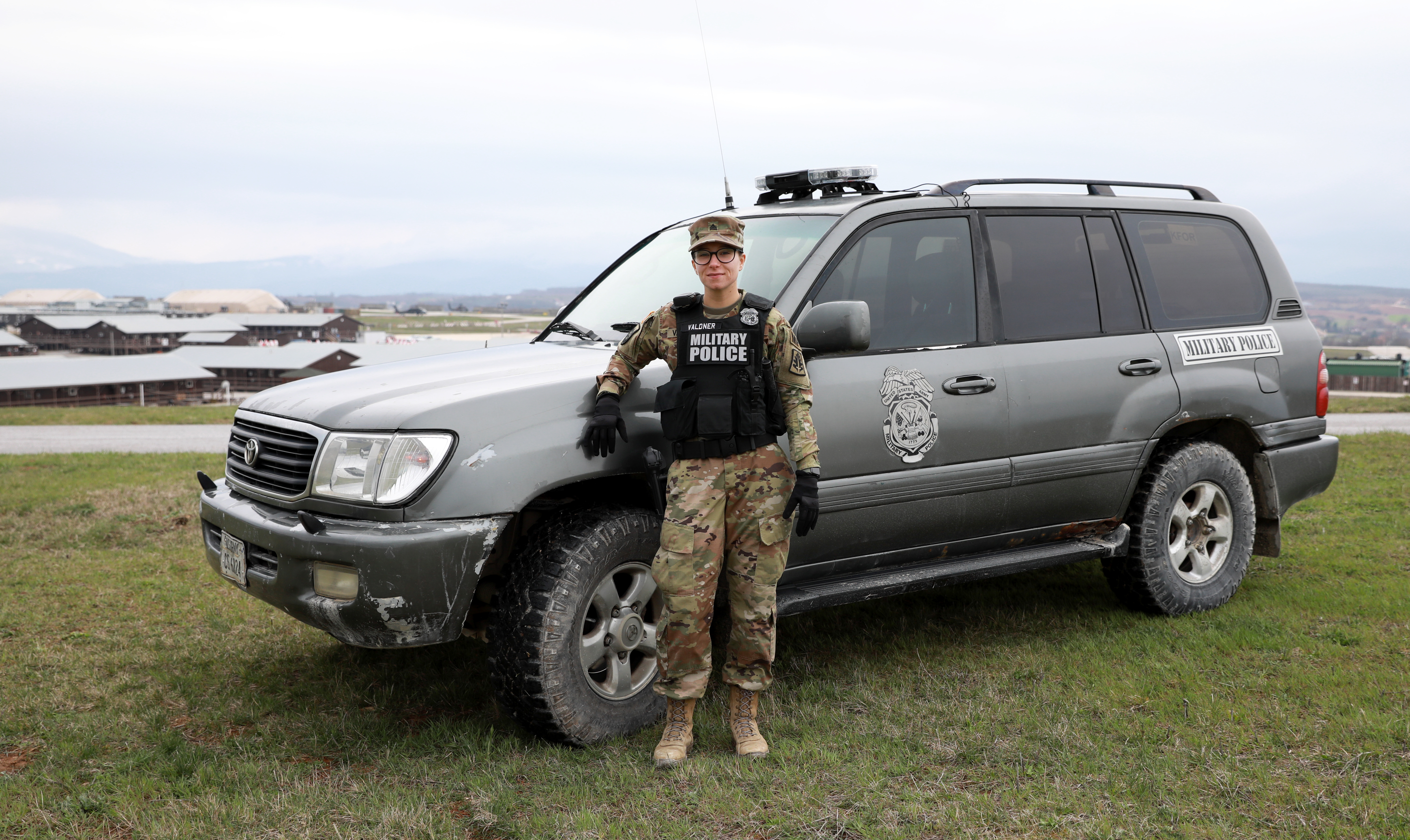
Army Reserve Sgt. Toni Ann Valdner with a Toyota Land Cruiser military police patrol car

A military police vehicle is a vehicle used by the military police entities of a country's armed forces.

== By country ==
=== Americas ===
==== Brazil ====
The Army Police of the Brazilian Army has dark gray Toyota Hilux trucks with "Polícia do Exército" written in yellow.

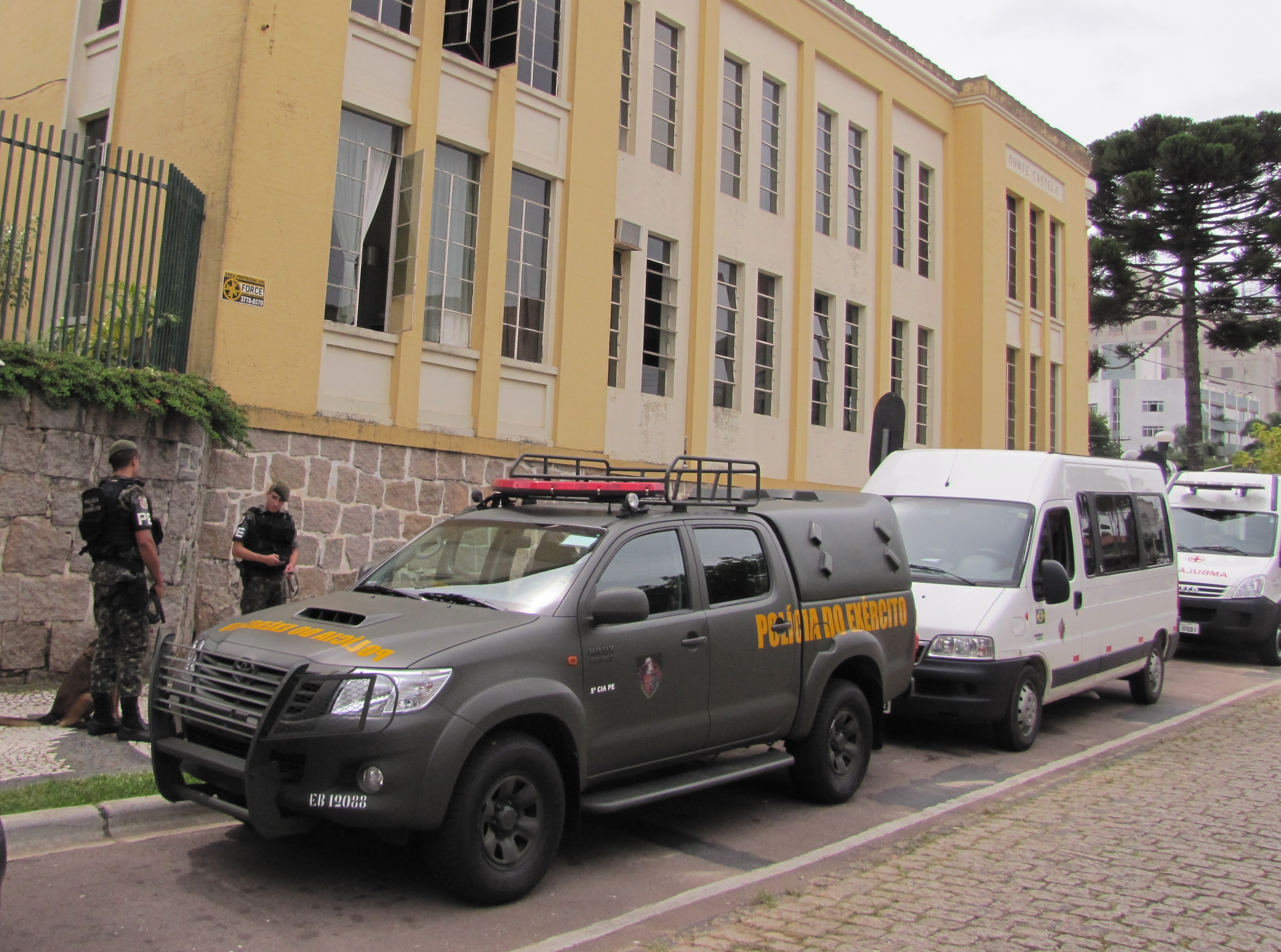
A Toyota Hilux as used by the Brazilian Army Police.

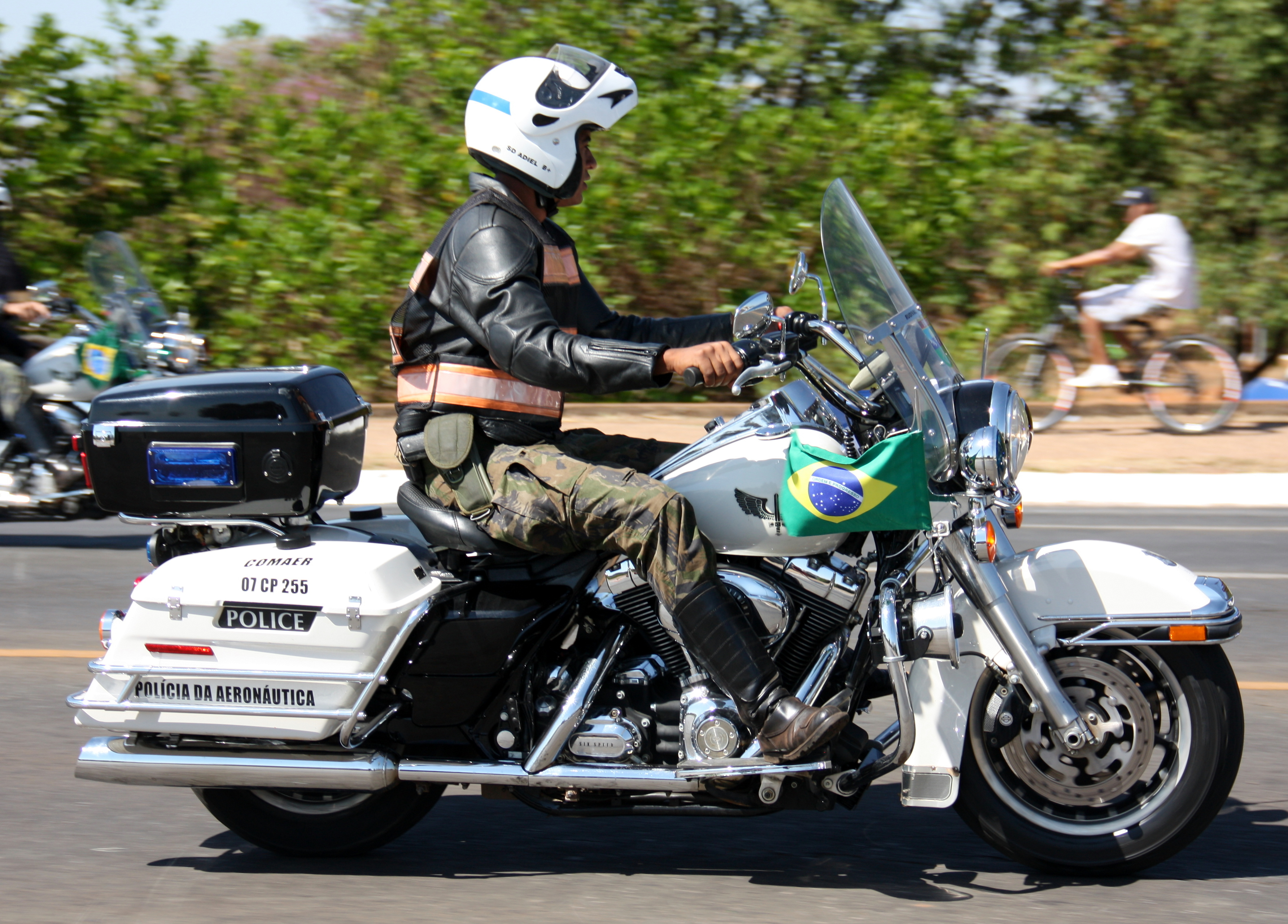
A Harley-Davidson motorcycle of the Brazilian Air Force Police (Polícia da Aeronáutica).

The police vehicles of the Military Police vary widely, as each state manages their own "military police," which are classed as reserve troops and ancillary forces of the Brazilian Army.

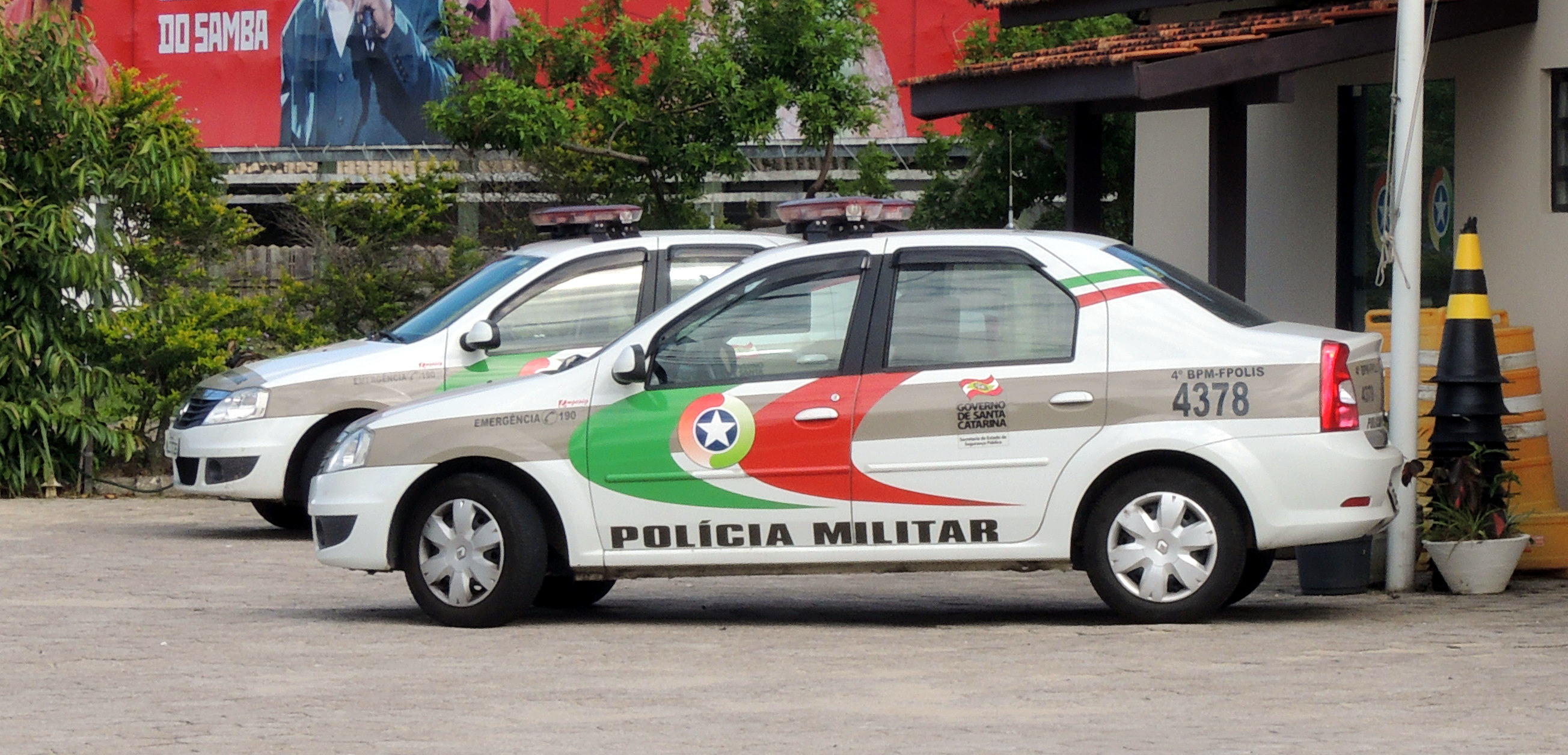
Brazilian Military Police Renault Logan response cars in Florianópolis.

==== Canada ====
Canadian Forces Military Police (CFMP) patrol vehicles are painted white with two red stripes and a police logo. CFMP reserve and regular field units have trucks painted olive green that say "Military Police Militaire" and have red or red and blue lights. Because of the terrain on certain bases, some units also have bicycles, all-terrain vehicles (ATVs), snowmobiles and watercraft.

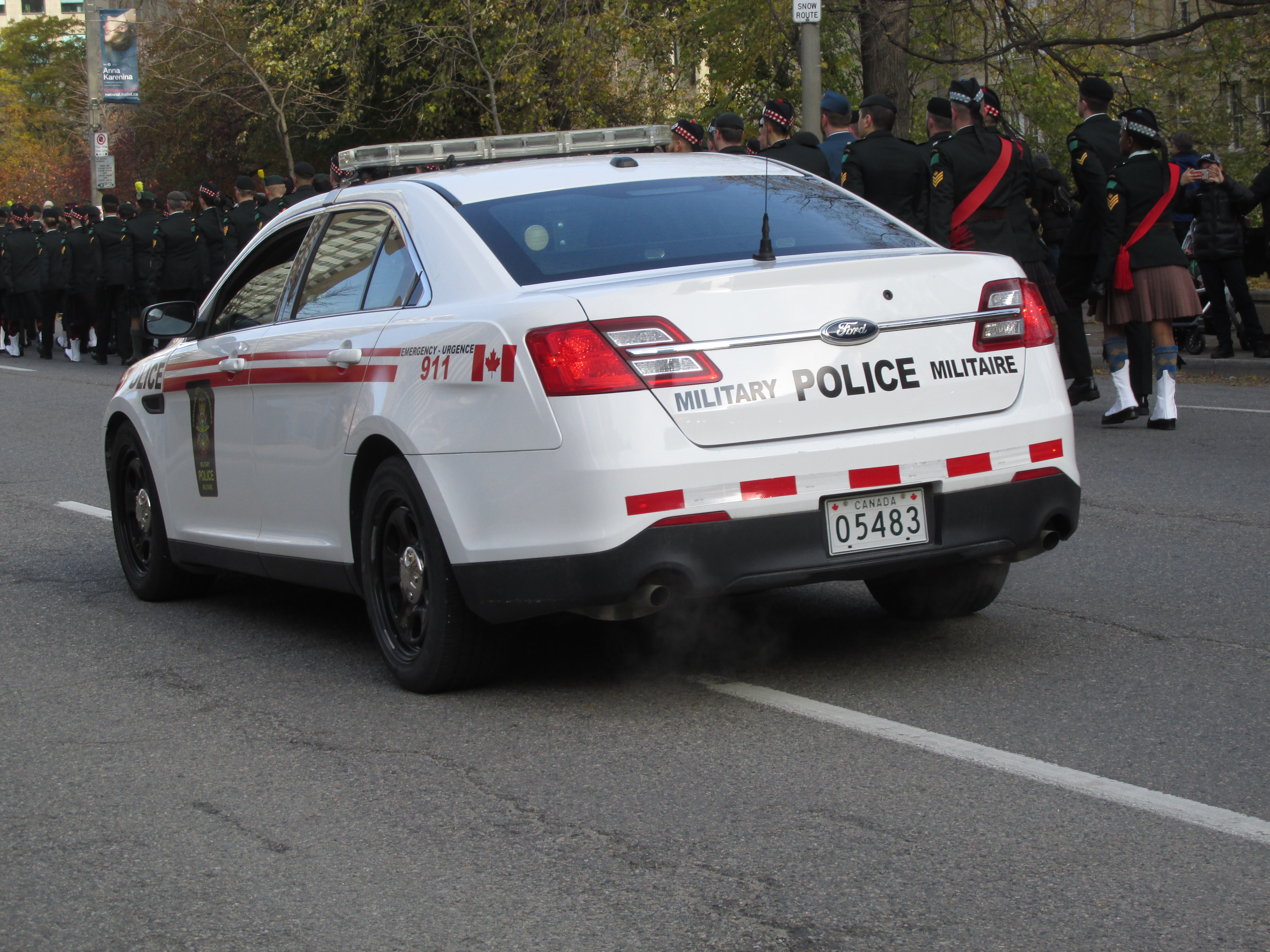
A Ford Police Interceptor Sedan with CFMP markings.

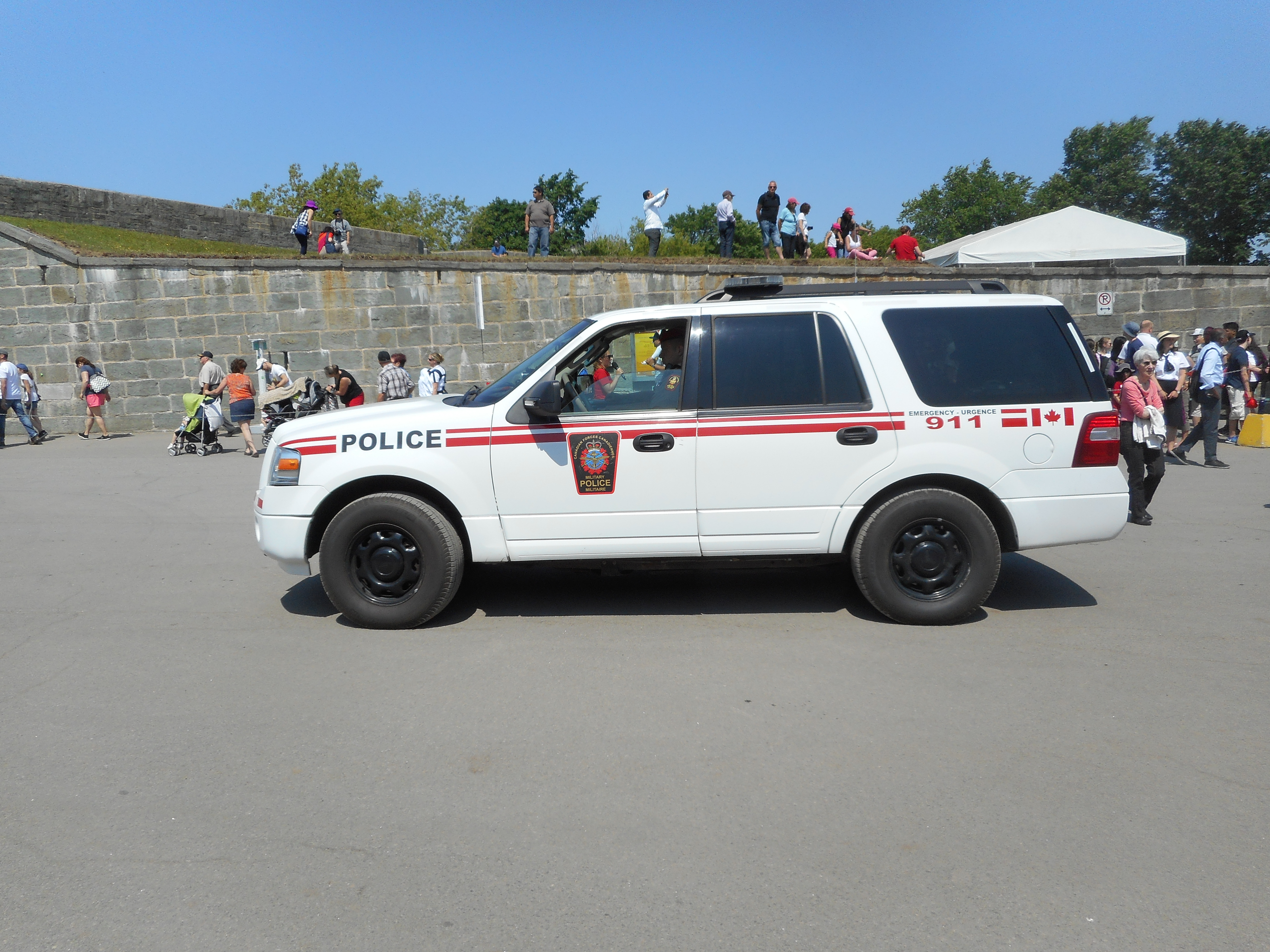
A CFMP Ford Expedition.

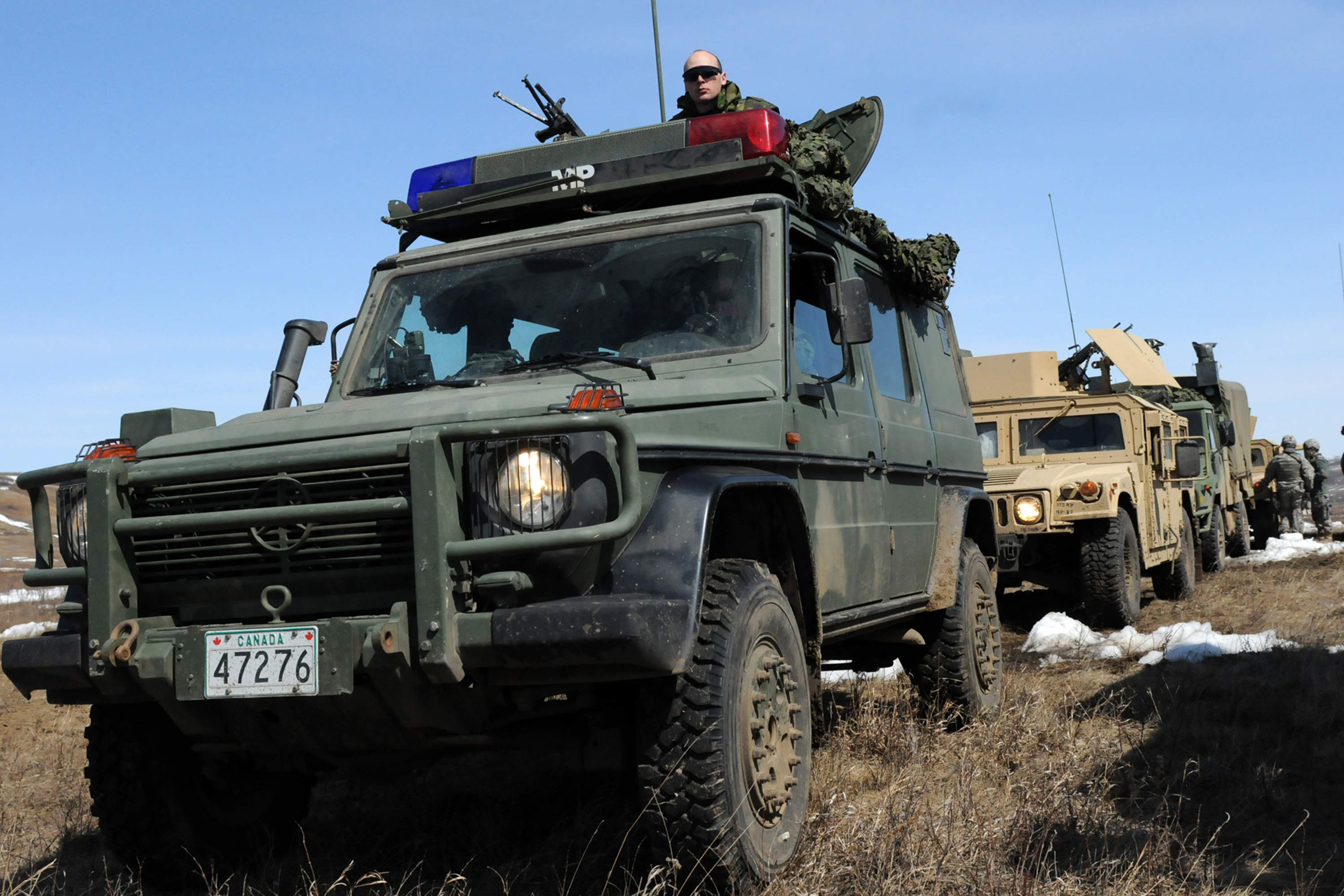
A Mercedes-Benz G-Class of a CFMP field unit.

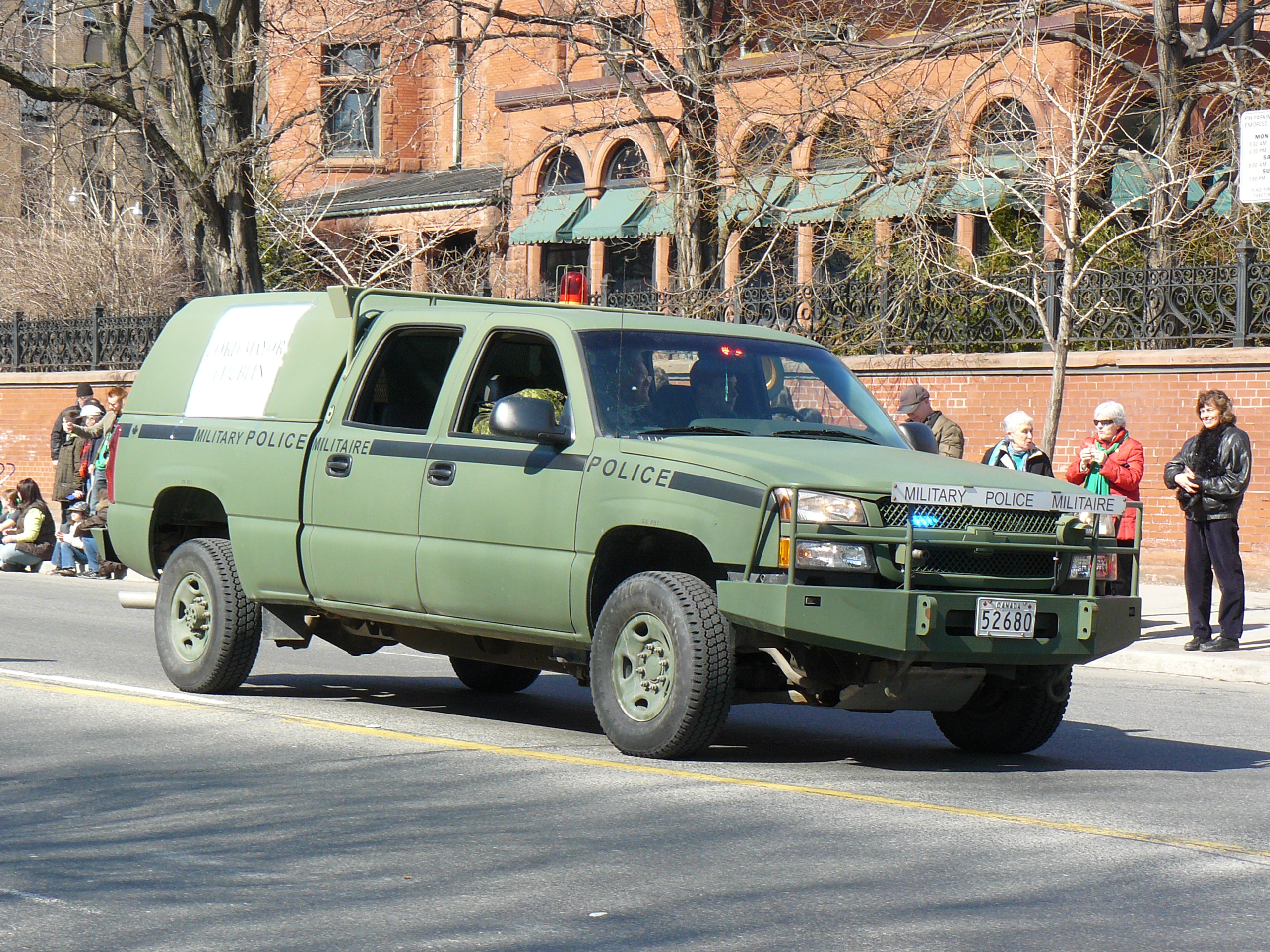
A CFMP Chevrolet Silverado (GMT880) “MilCOTS” of a CFMP field unit.

==== United States ====
When forward deployed, United States military police units customarily employ Humvees or internal security vehicles called the M1117 armored security vehicle. When conducting on-post law enforcement, military police typically employ patrol cars similar to those used by civilian police departments. Overseas U.S. military installations may employ patrol cars similar to those of their host country.

Special agents of the military investigative agencies may employ unmarked civilian vehicles in the course of their duties within the United States. In combat zones, these agents employ the same tactical vehicles as other military police units.

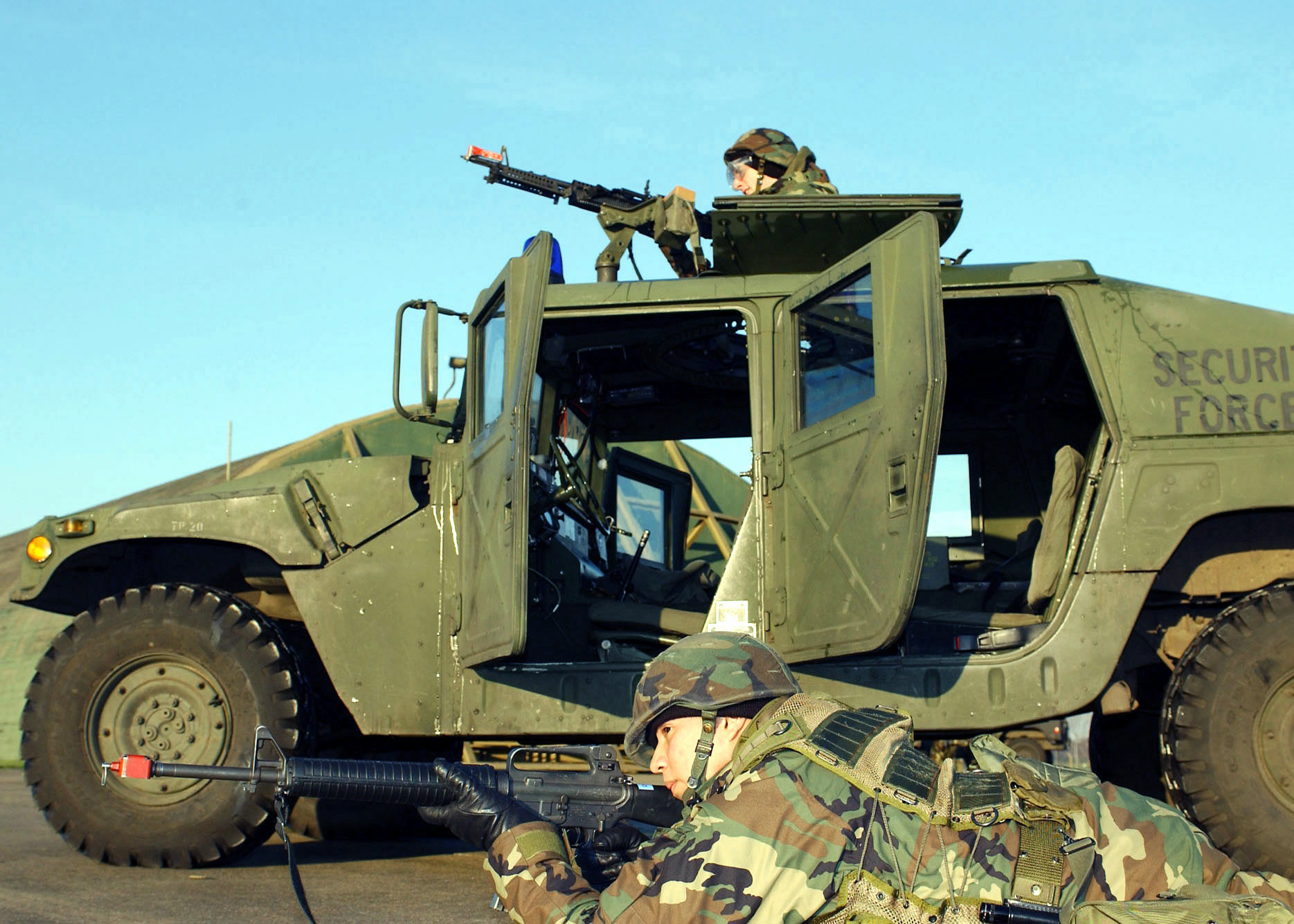
A Humvee of the United States Air Force Security Forces.

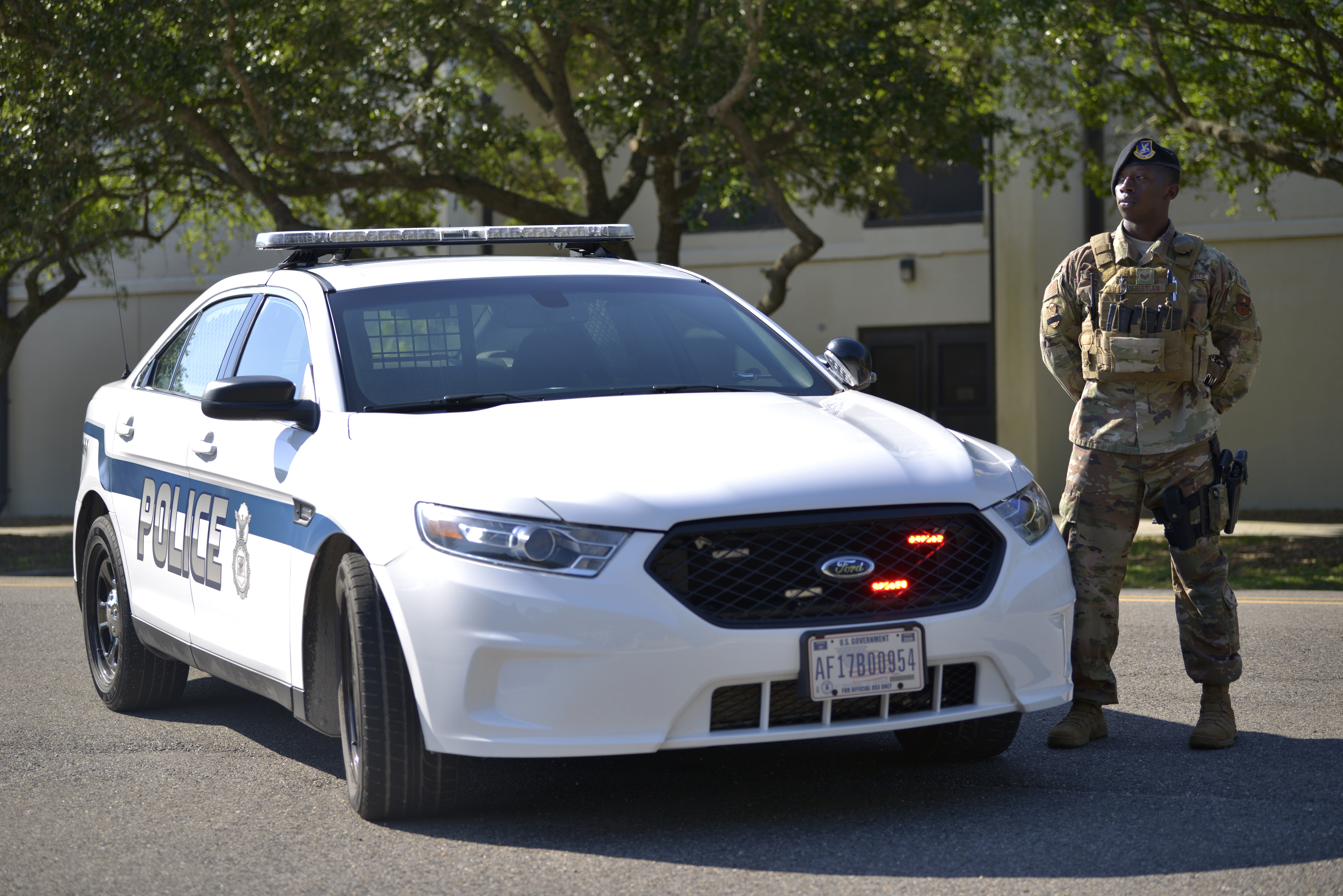
A Ford Police Interceptor Sedan, typically employed by the USAF Security Forces.

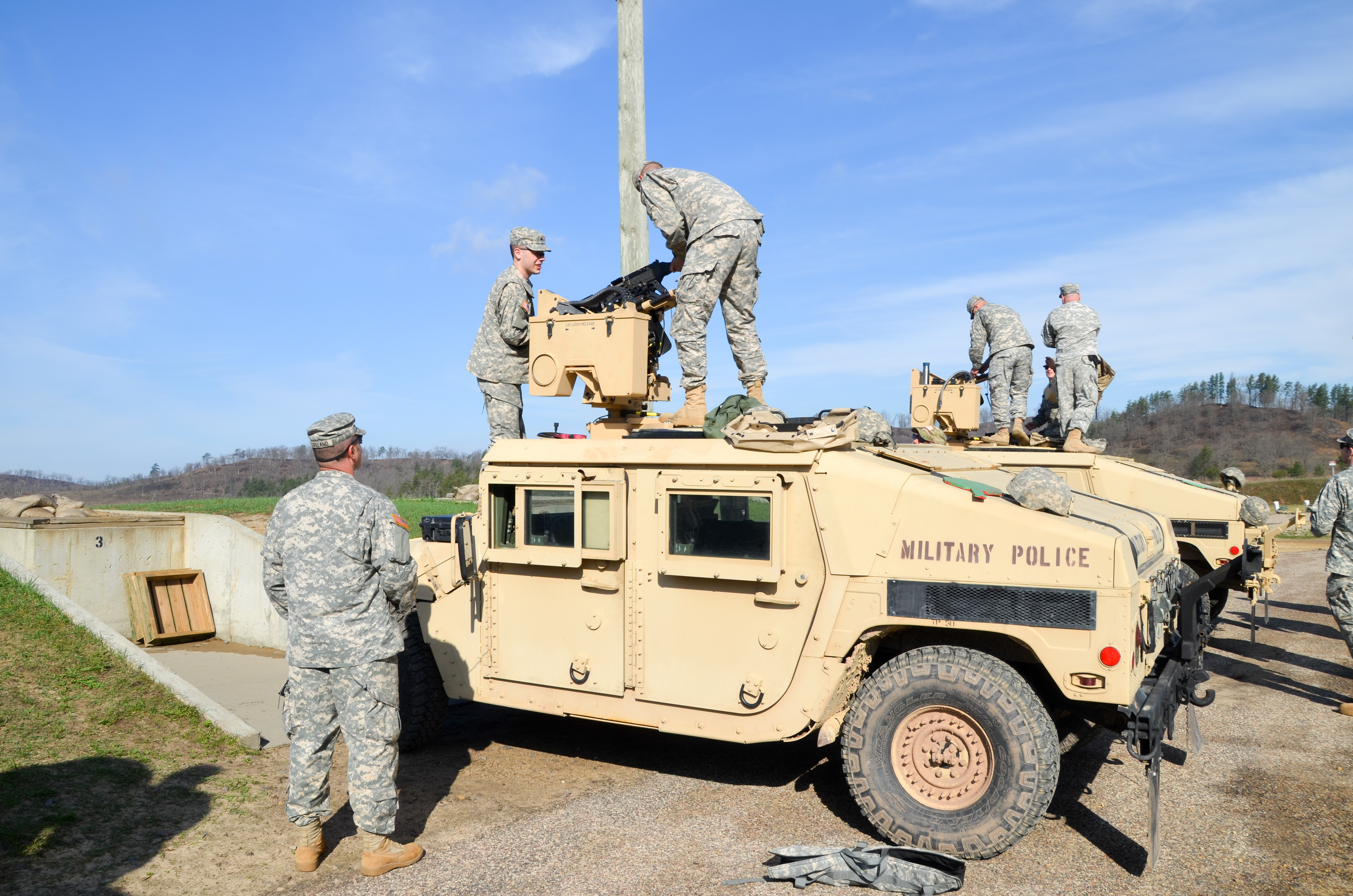
A military police Humvee of the United States Army Military Police Corps.

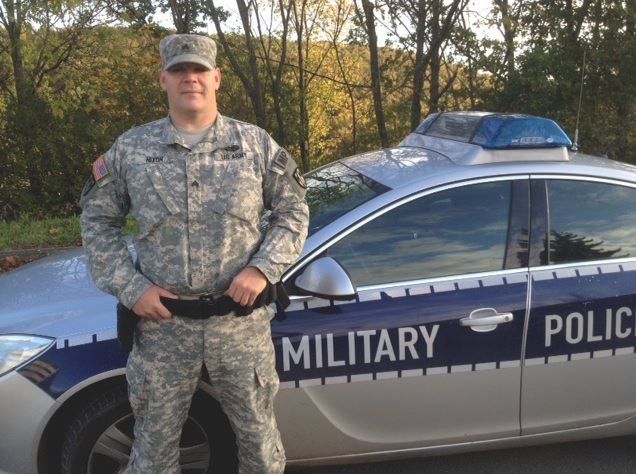
A U.S. Army Military Police patrol car in Miesau Army Depot, Germany. Its livery designed similarly to the German police cars

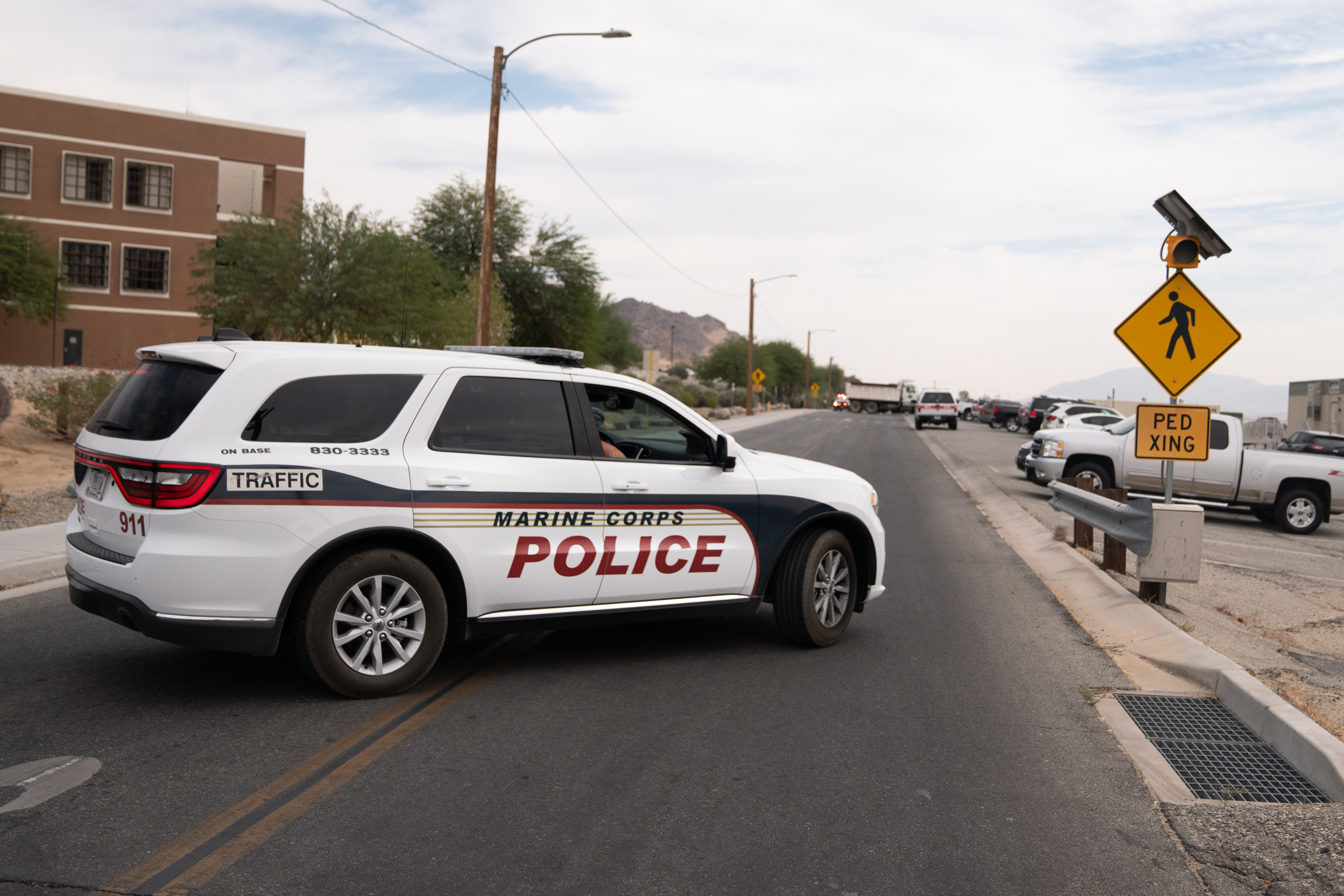
A Dodge Durango of the United States Marine Corps Military Police.

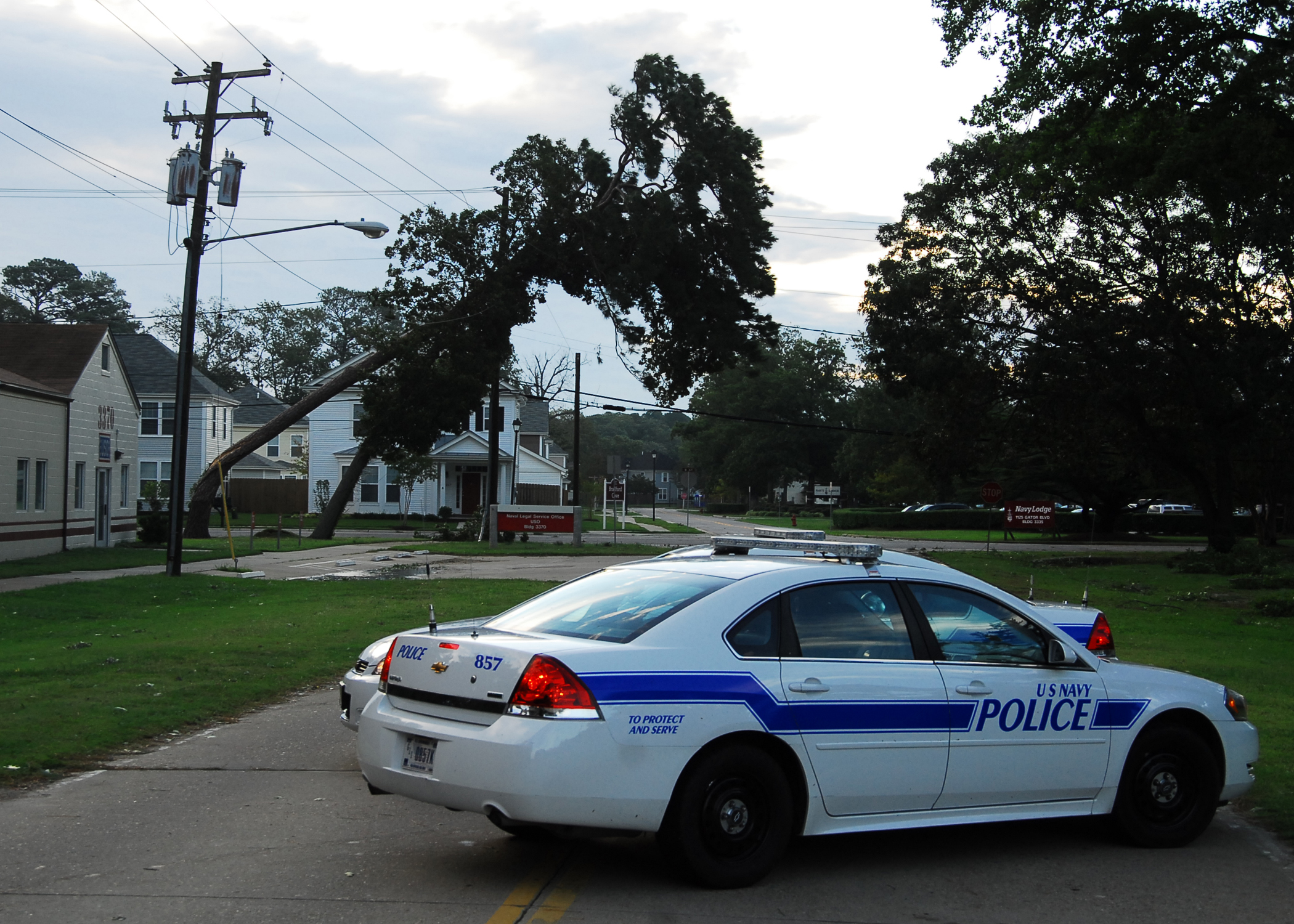
A Chevrolet Impala of the United States Navy Police.

=== Asia ===
==== India ====
The Corps of Military Police of the Indian Army often uses white Maruti Suzuki Gypsys for their missions. The Indian Air Force Police use similar vehicles, in a sky blue color instead.

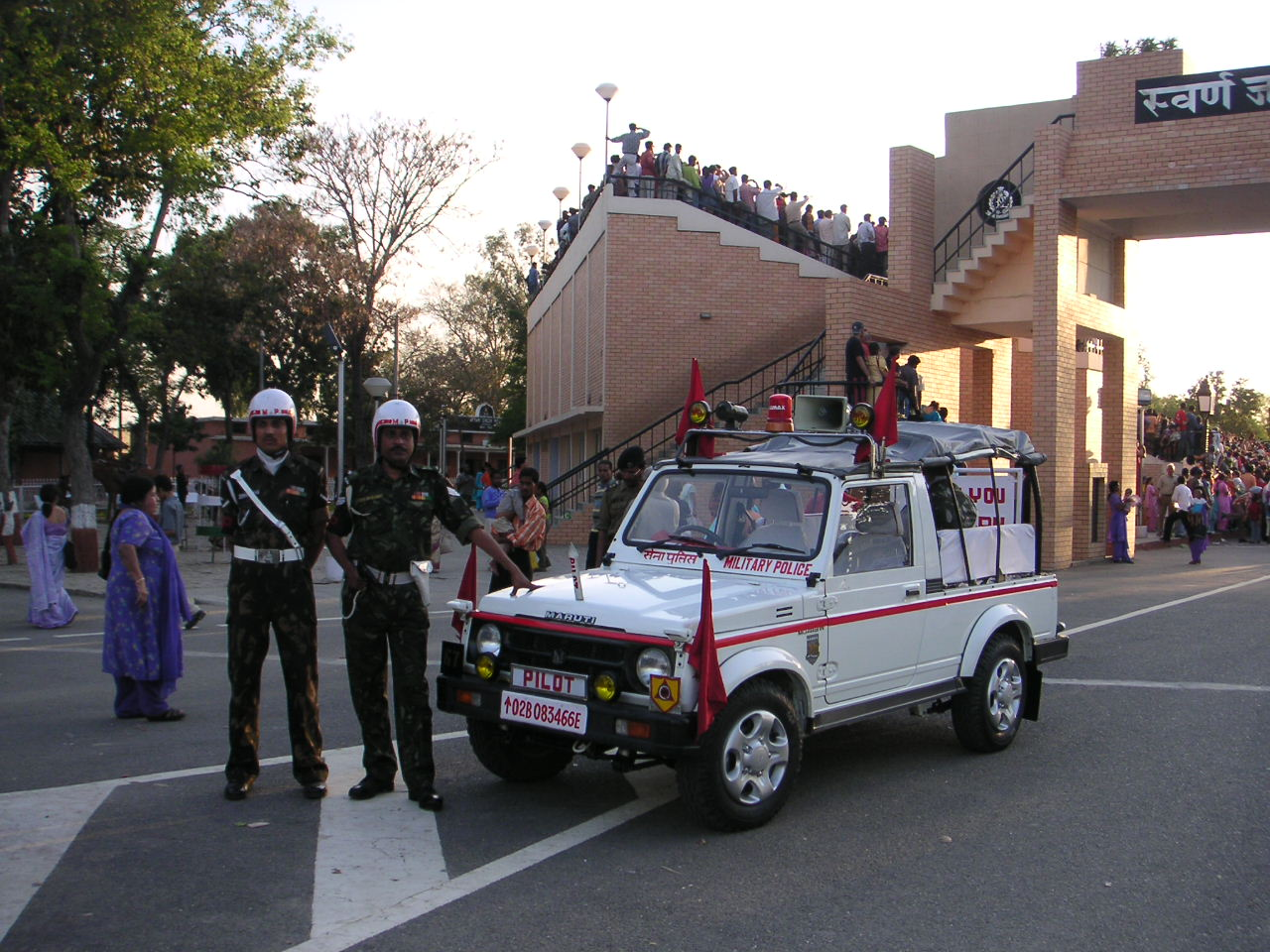
Two Corps of Military Police personnel stand beside their Maruti Gypsy.

==== Israel ====
The Israel Defense Forces Military Police Corps use 2013 Hyundai i35 Elantra (used by "Yamlat" unit) and 2017 Hyundai i25.

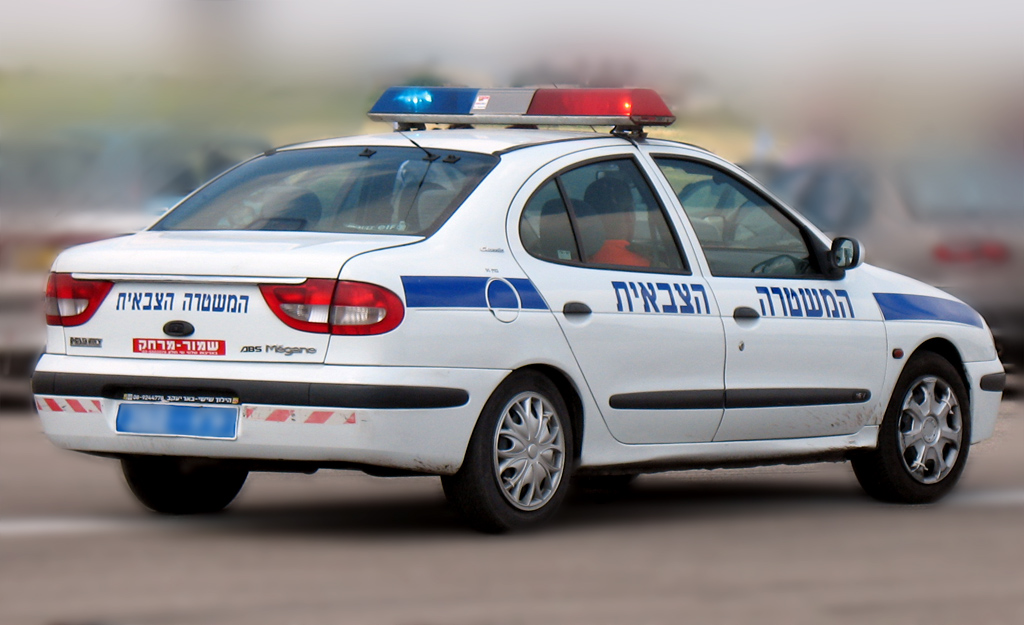
An Israeli military police patrol car, a Renault Mégane.

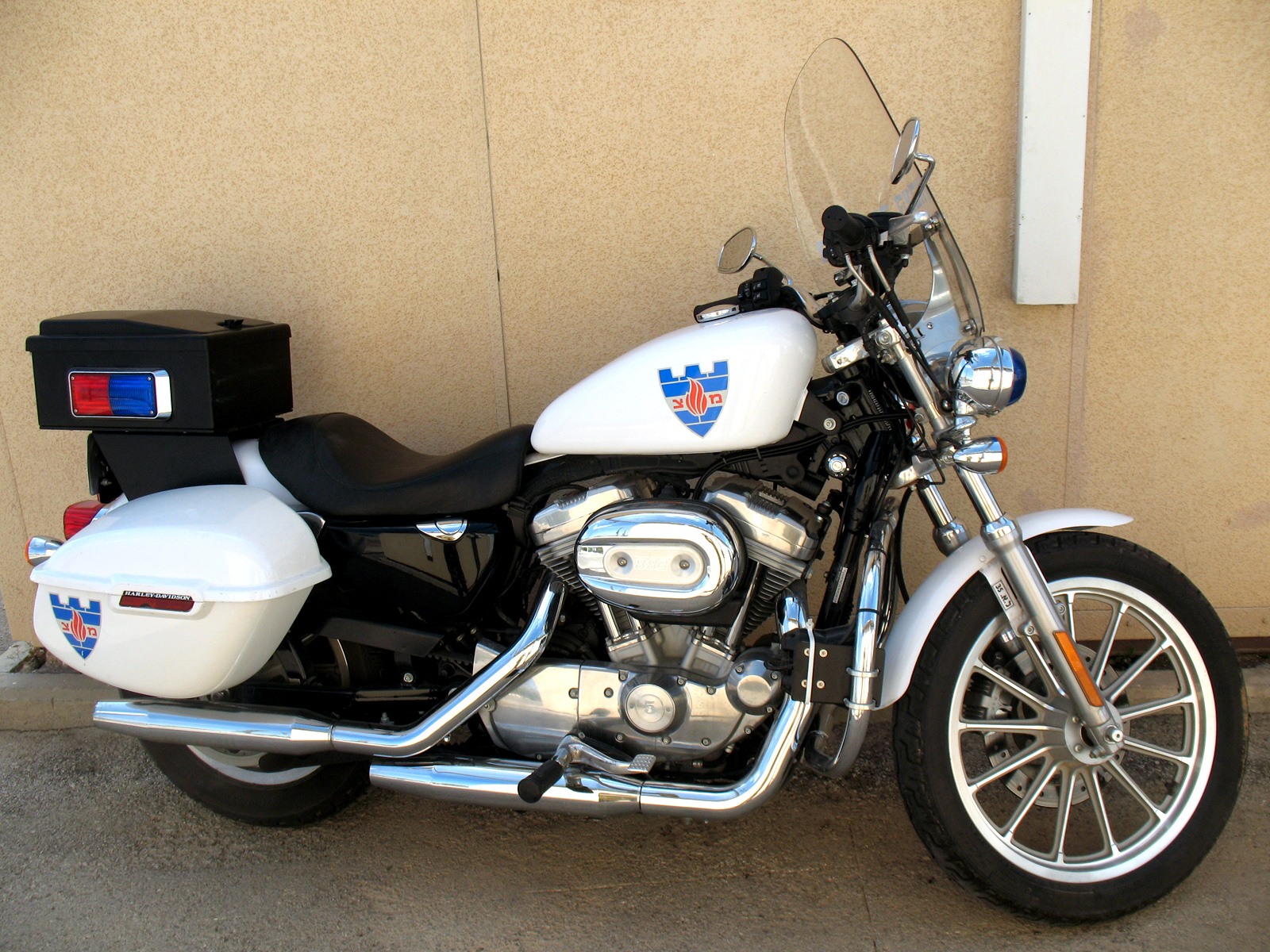
An Israeli military police Harley-Davidson Sportster.

Vehicles no longer in service include Daihatsu Applauses, Renault Méganes, Chevrolet Optras, Subaru B4s, Ford Mondeos and Kia Rios.

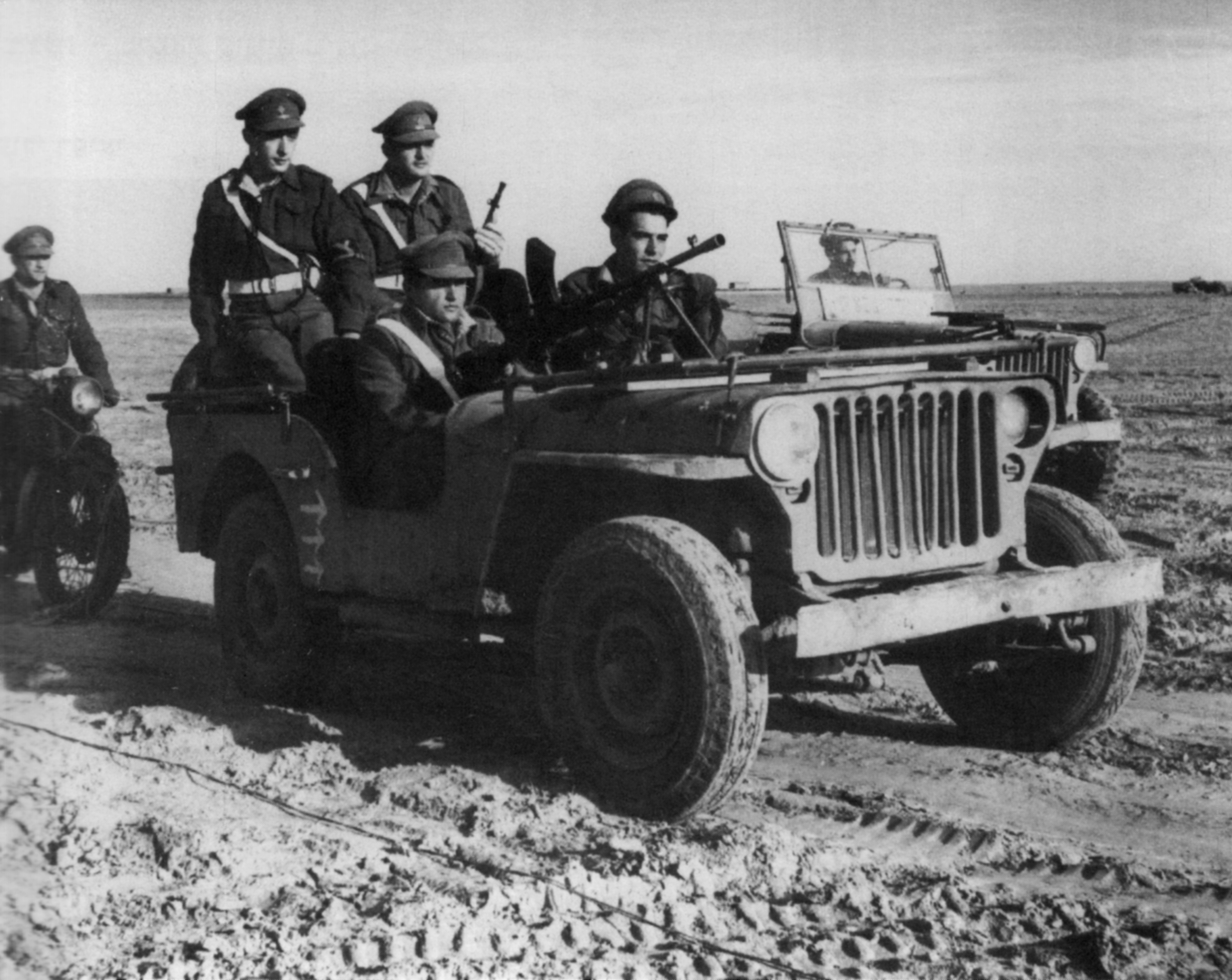
A Willys MB vehicle of the Israeli Military Police Corps in the 1948 Arab–Israeli War.

==== Japan ====
The Japan Self-Defense Forces utilize white vehicles equipped with sirens for their military police duties.

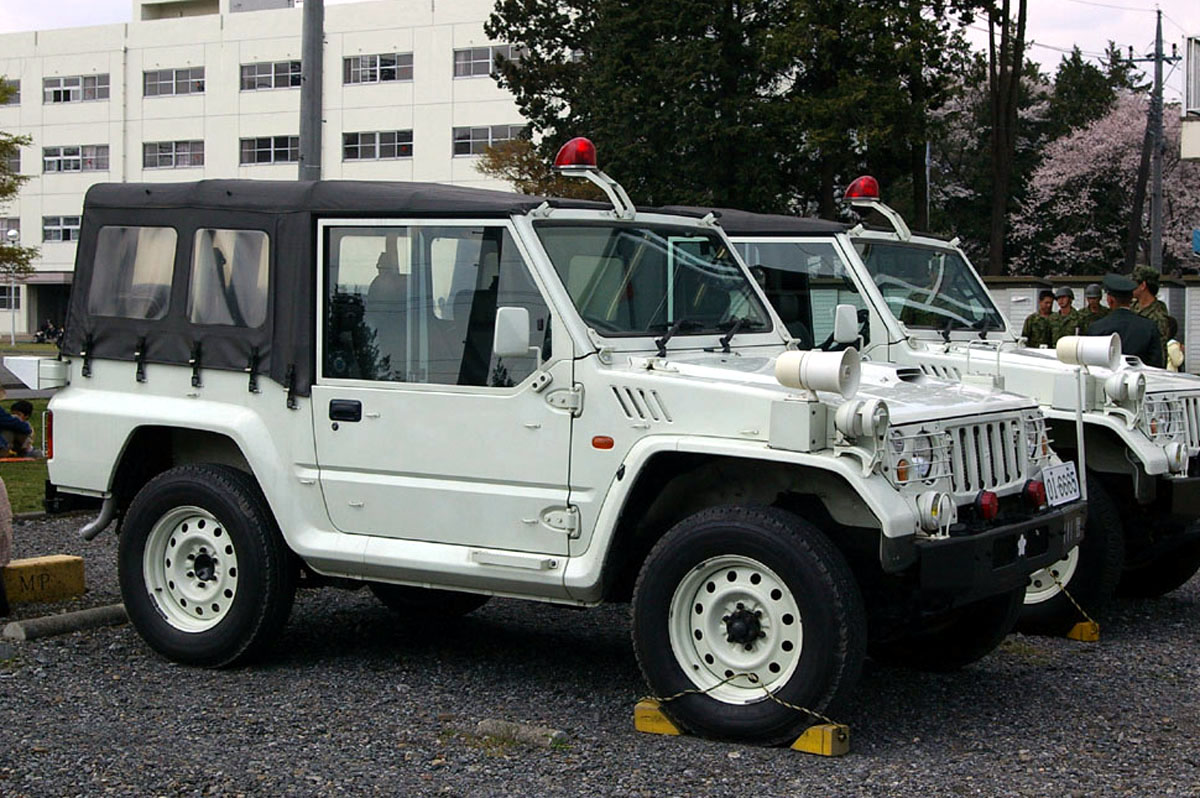
A Mitsubishi Type 73 light truck used by the Japan Ground Self-Defense Force, the JGSDF police.

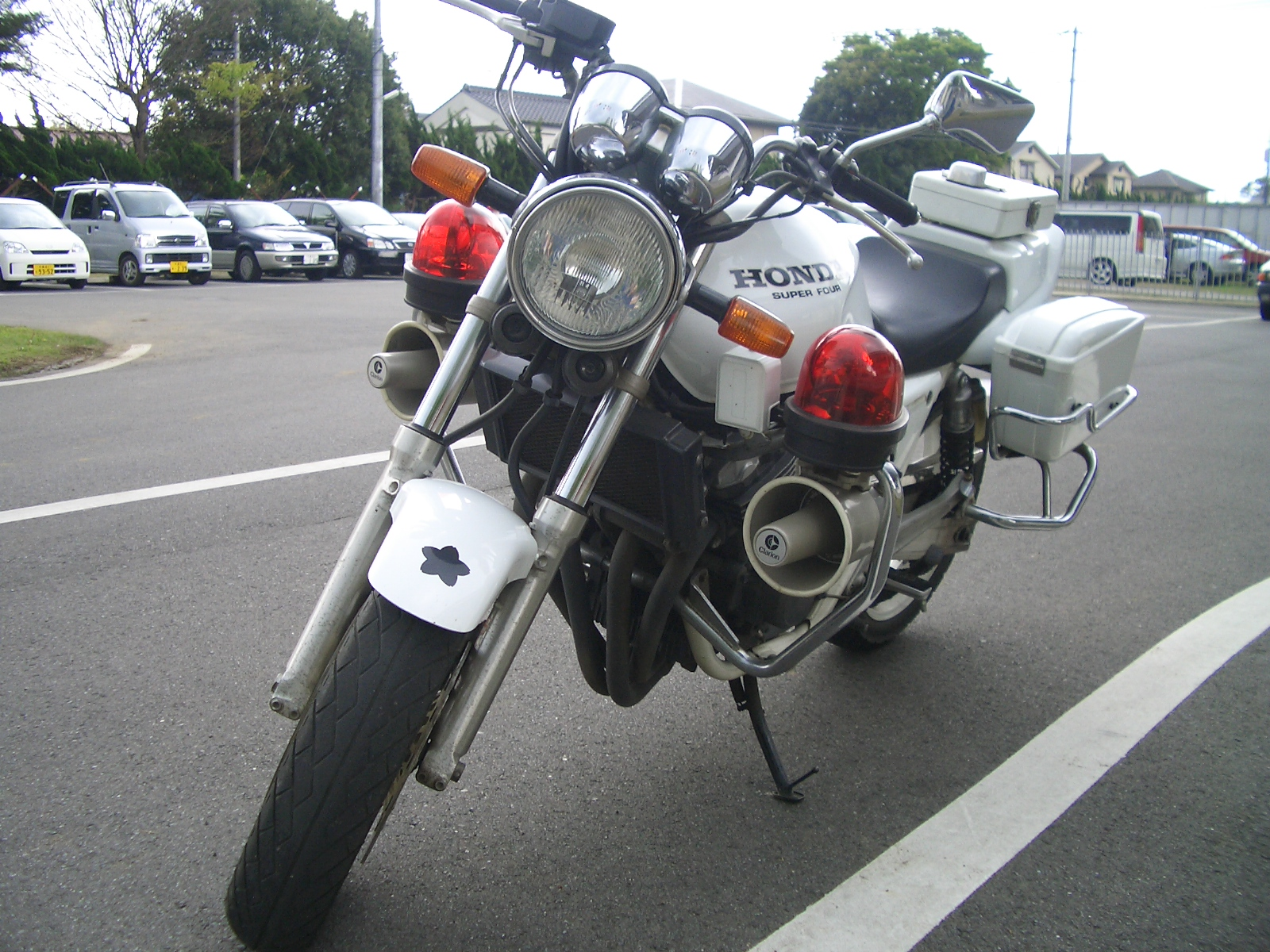
A JGSDF Honda Police motorcycle.

==== Taiwan ====
The Republic of China Military Police (ROCMP) uses a fleet of black patrol cars with white writing on the side. These vehicles are most commonly Volkswagen Passats, Isuzu Rodeos, and Ford Escapes.

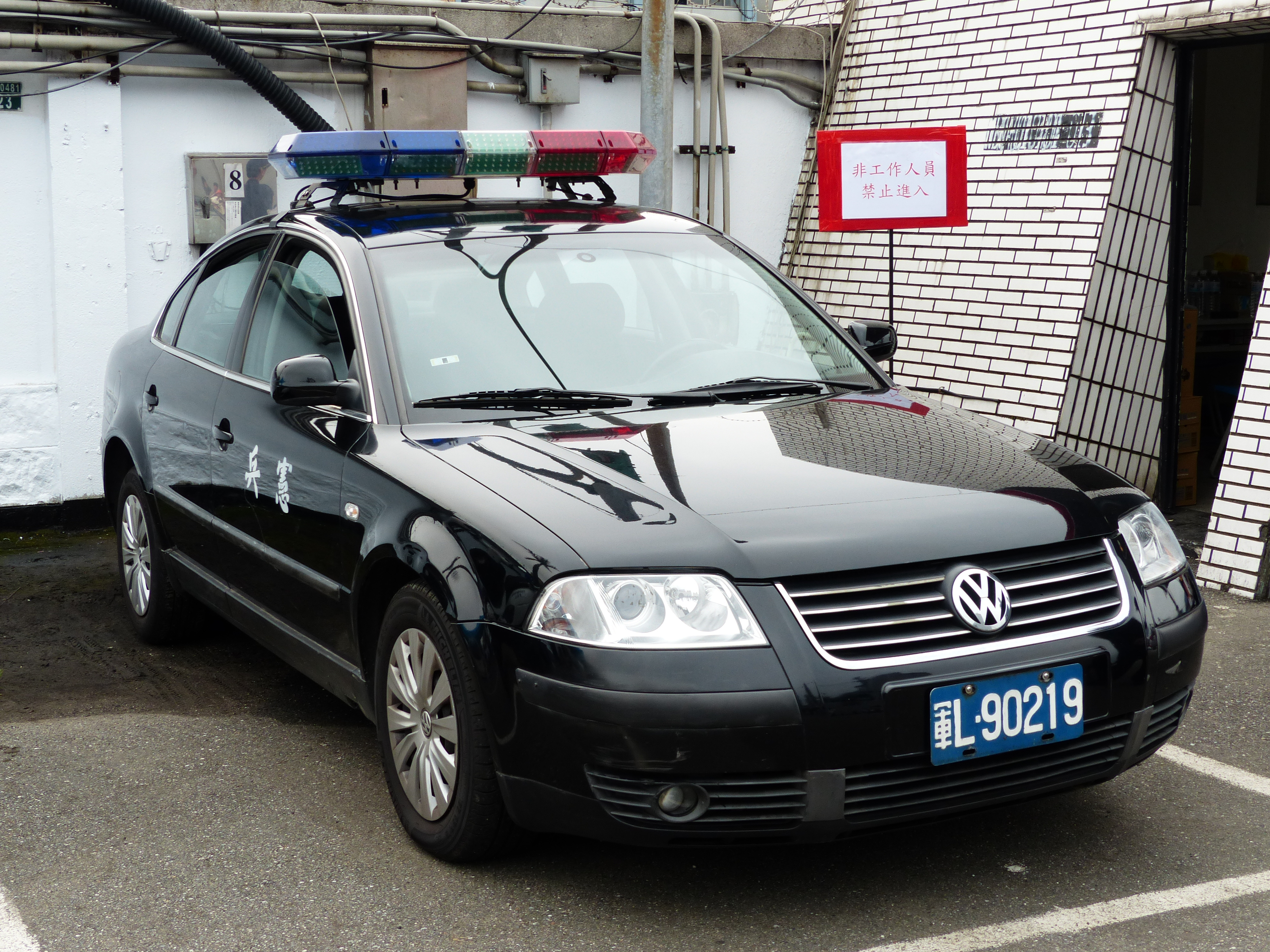
A ROCMP Volkswagen Passat (B5)/Volkswagen Jetta patrol car at the Naval Pier of Keelung.

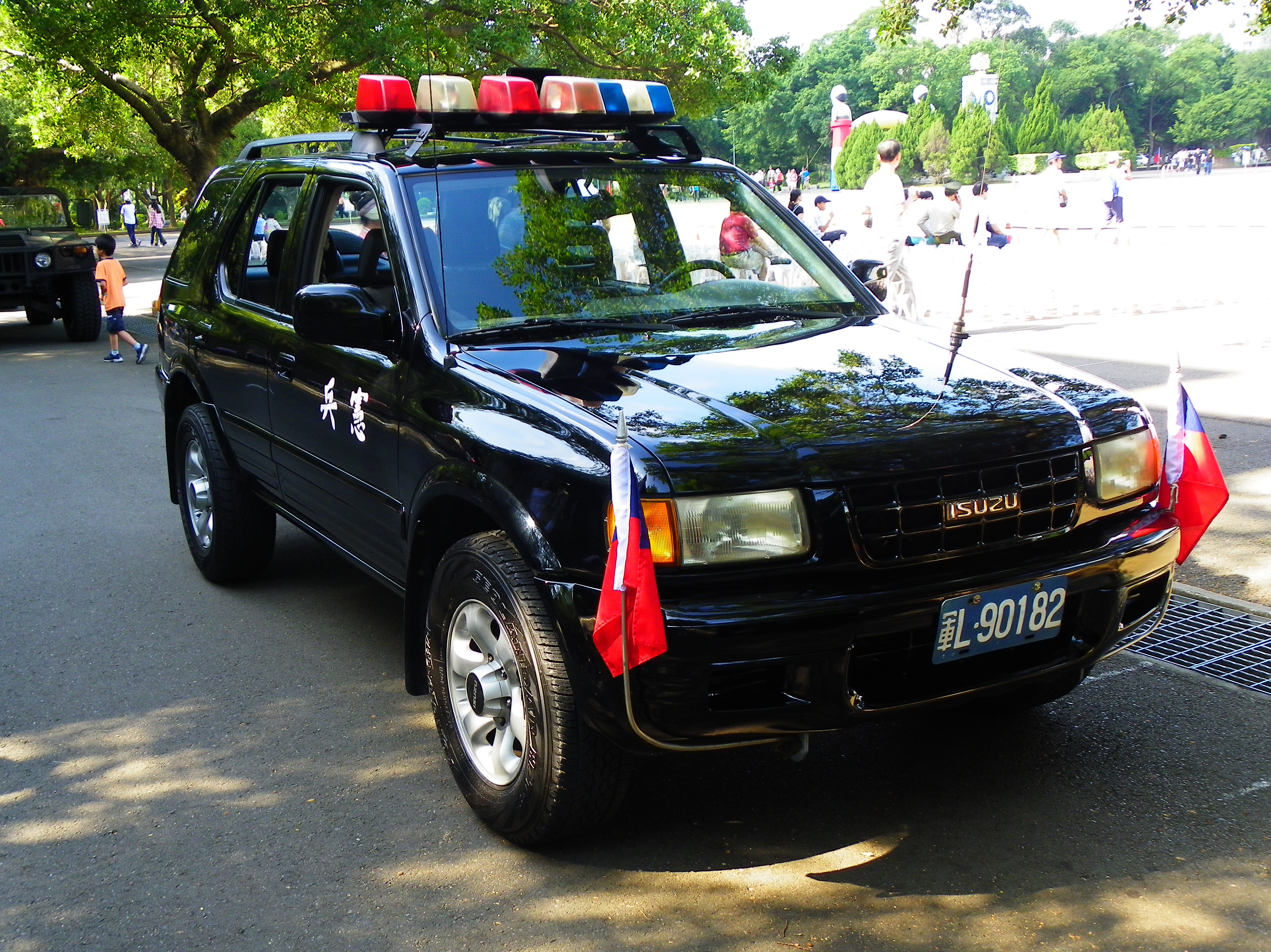
An Isuzu Rodeo patrol car at the Military Police School of the ROCMP.

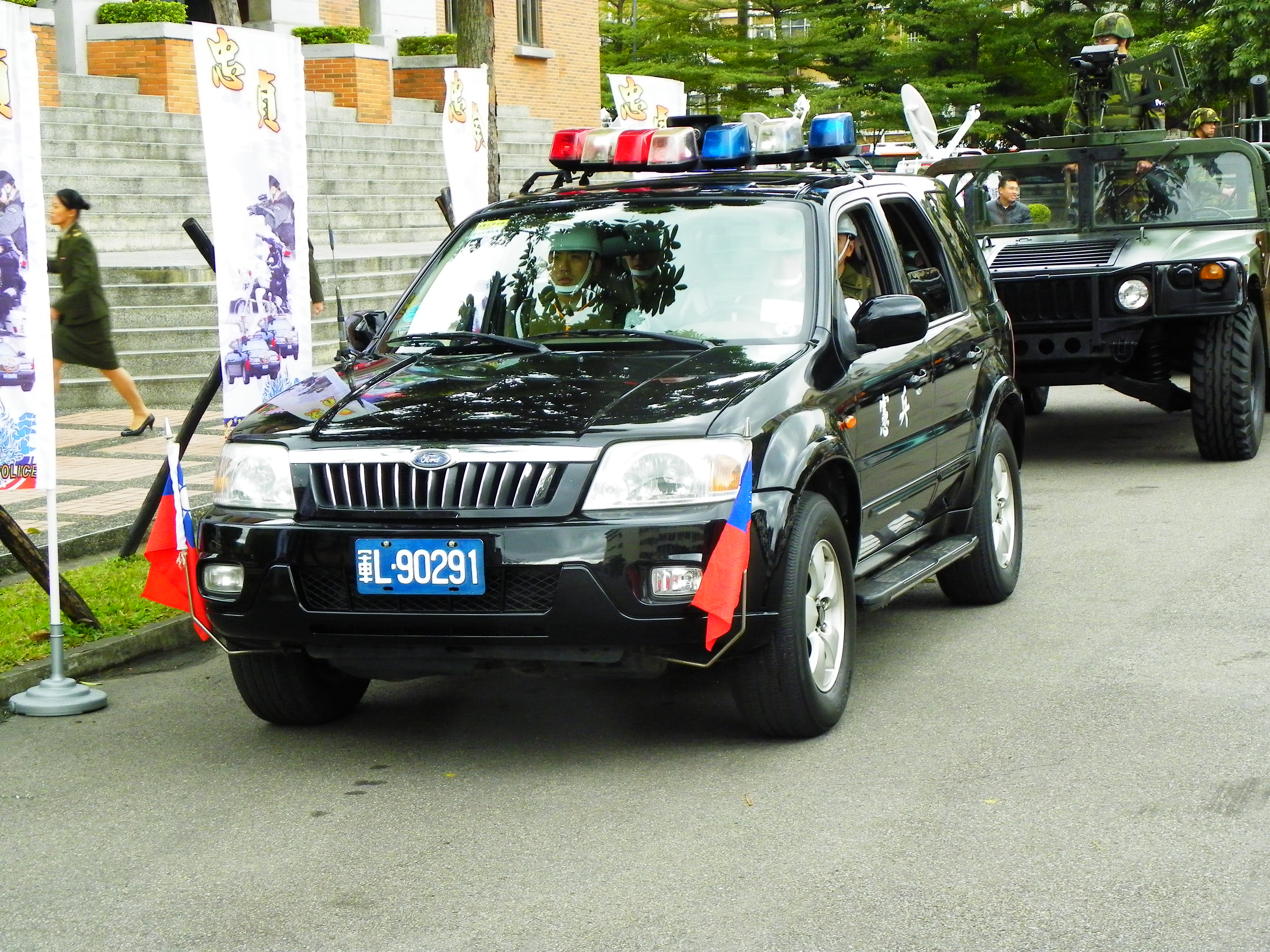
A Ford Escape patrol car of the ROCMP.

=== Europe ===
==== Germany ====
The Feldjäger are the military police of the Bundeswehr, Germany's armed forces. They mainly utilize the Mercedes-Benz Vito and the Nissan Patrol for regular patrol duties. When deployed abroad, the ATF Dingo and SSA Wolf are often used for military police duties.

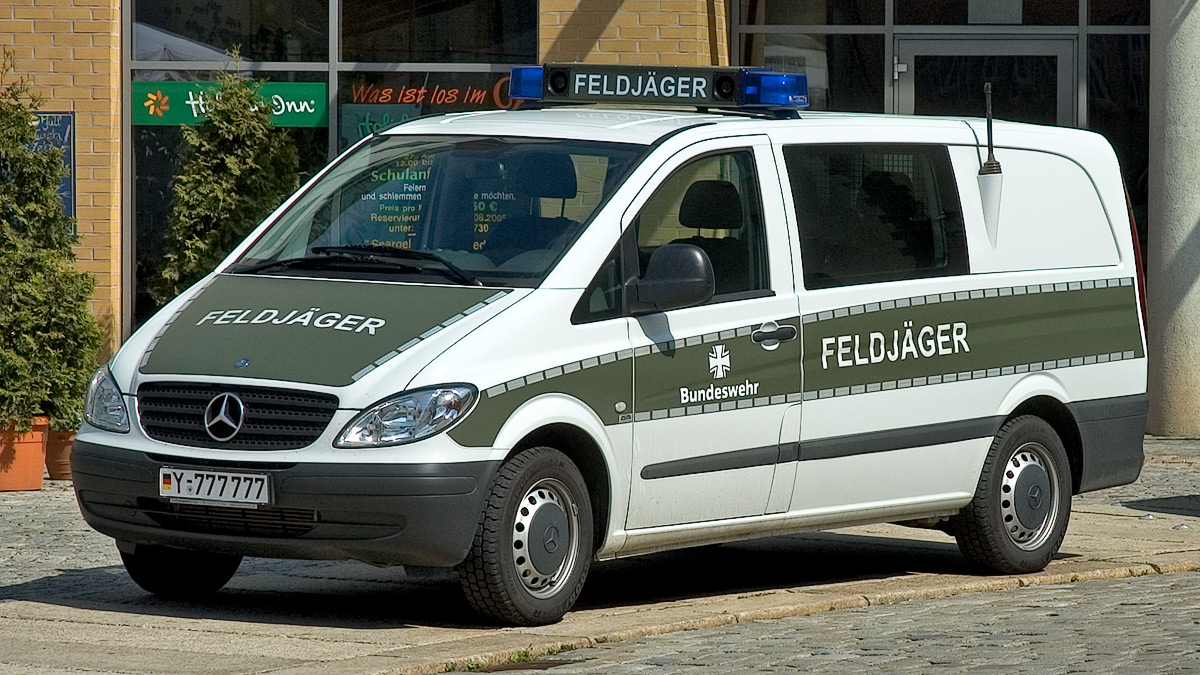
A Mercedes-Benz Vito patrol vehicle of the Feldjäger.

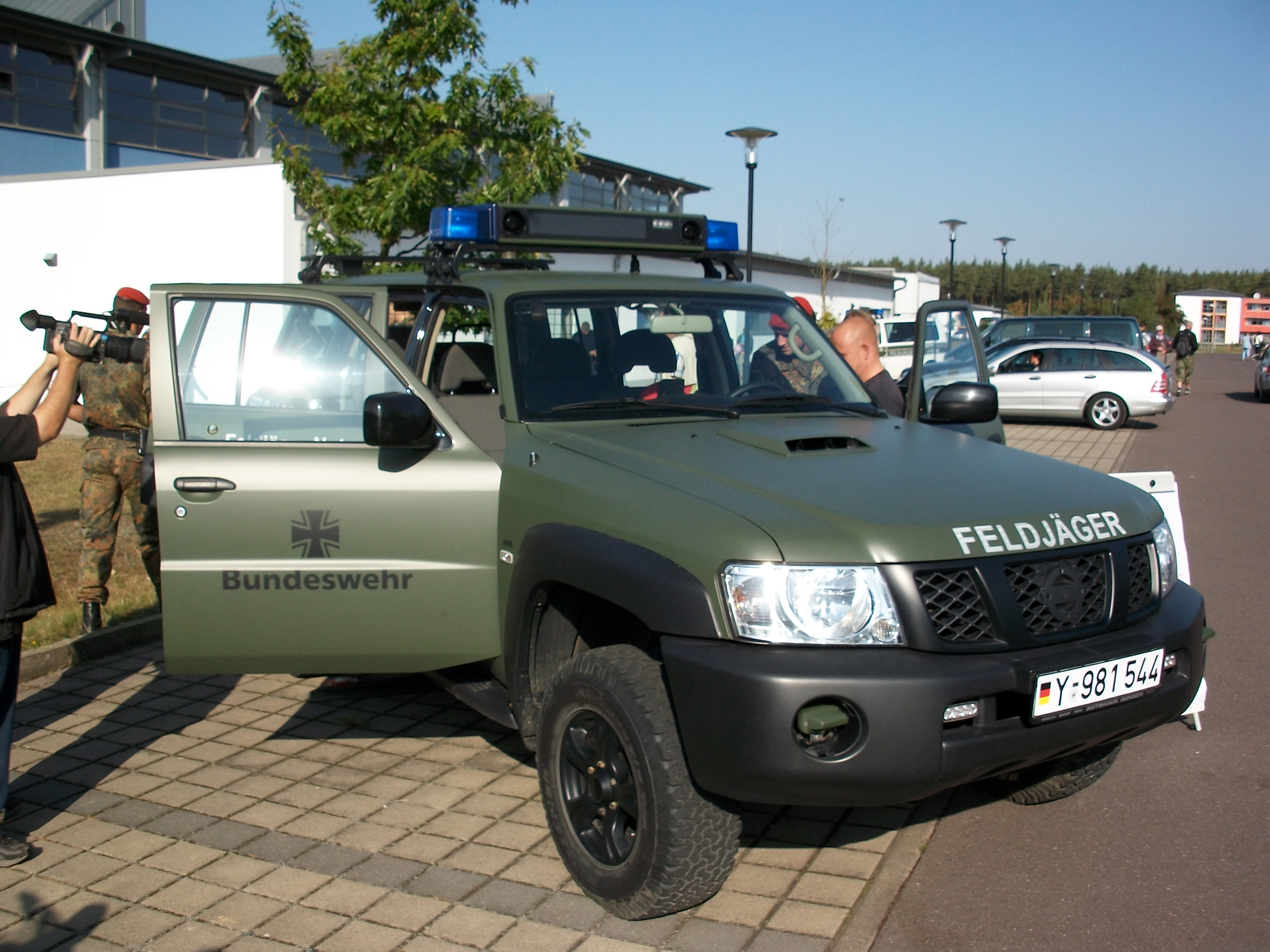
A Feldjäger Nissan Patrol.

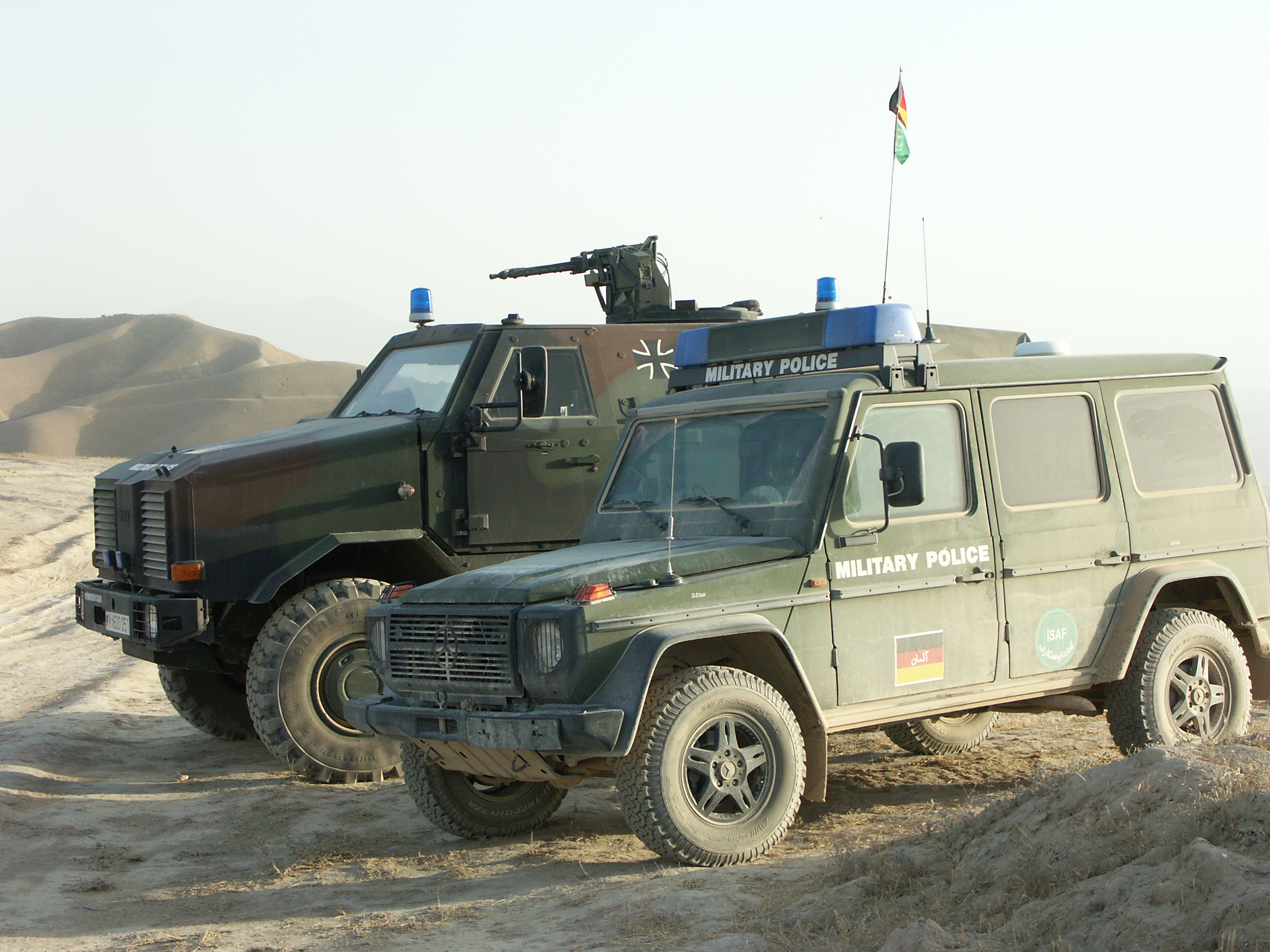
Feldjäger ATF DINGO I and Mercedes-Benz G-Klasse WOLF SSA vehicles of the Feldjäger deployed in Afghanistan in 2006.

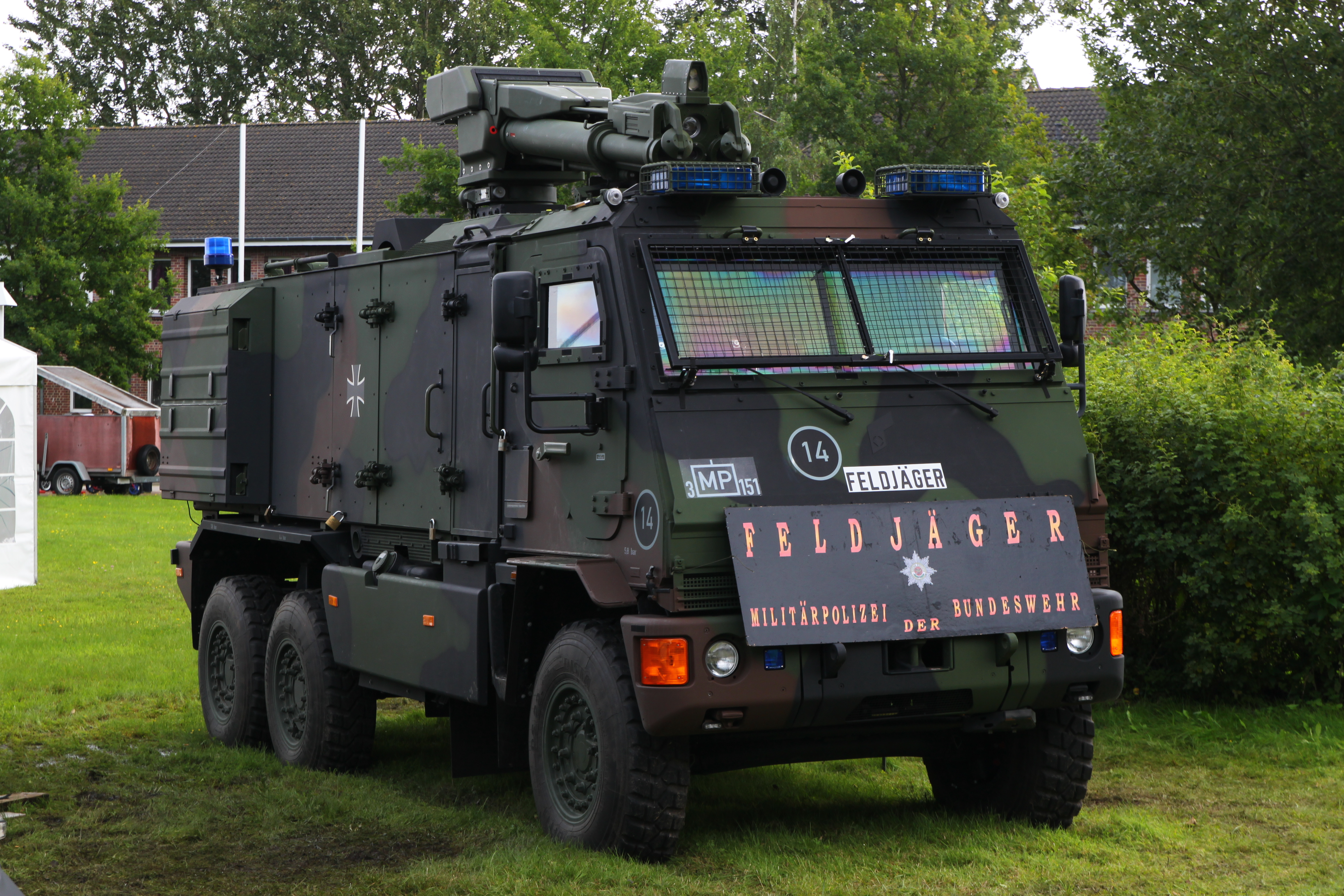
A Mowag DURO-3 YAK water cannon of the Feldjäger.

==== Poland ====
The Military Gendarmerie utilizes the Škoda Octavia in dark green with a white stripe and "ƵW" written on each front door for patrol duties.

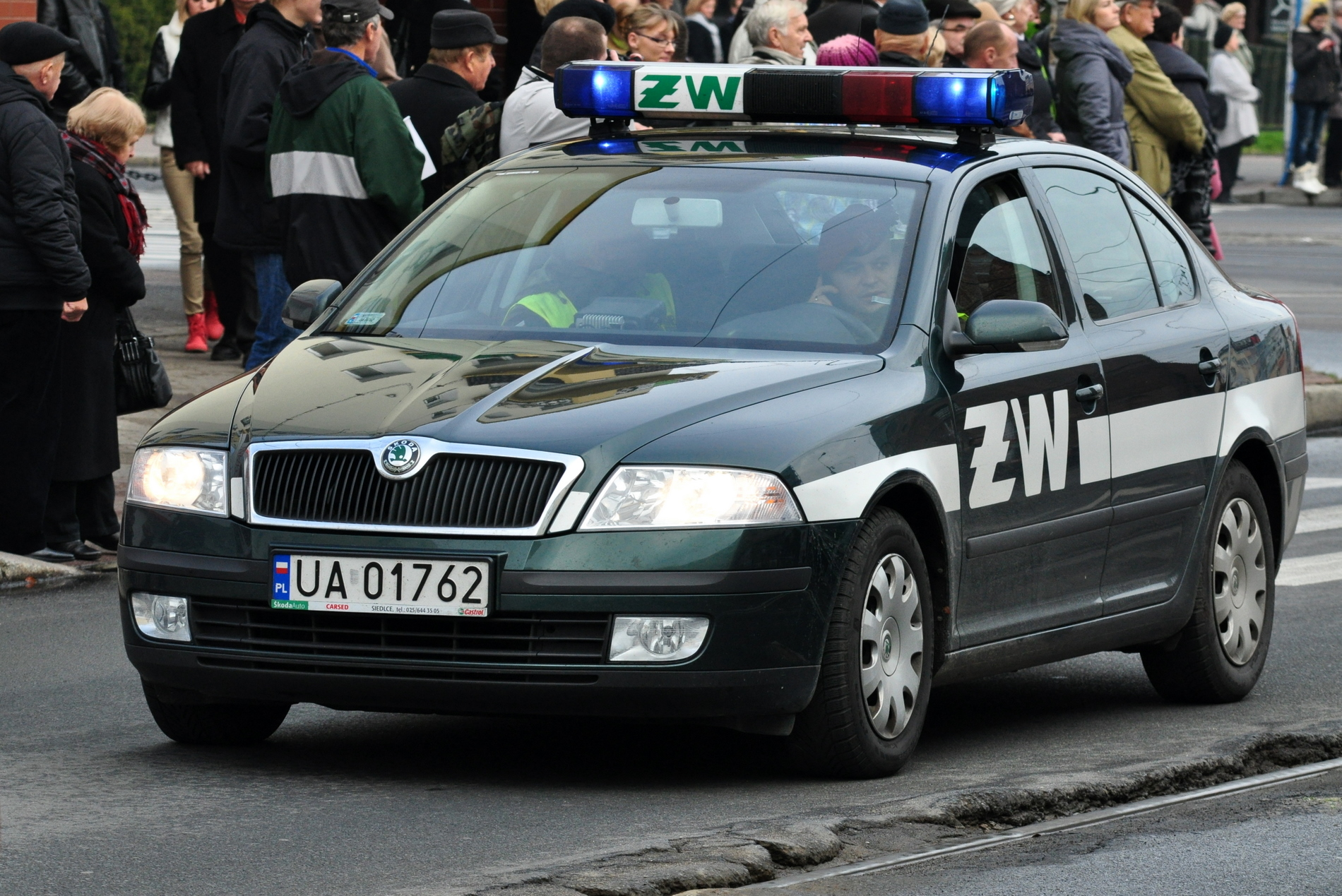
A Polish ŻW Škoda Octavia military police car.

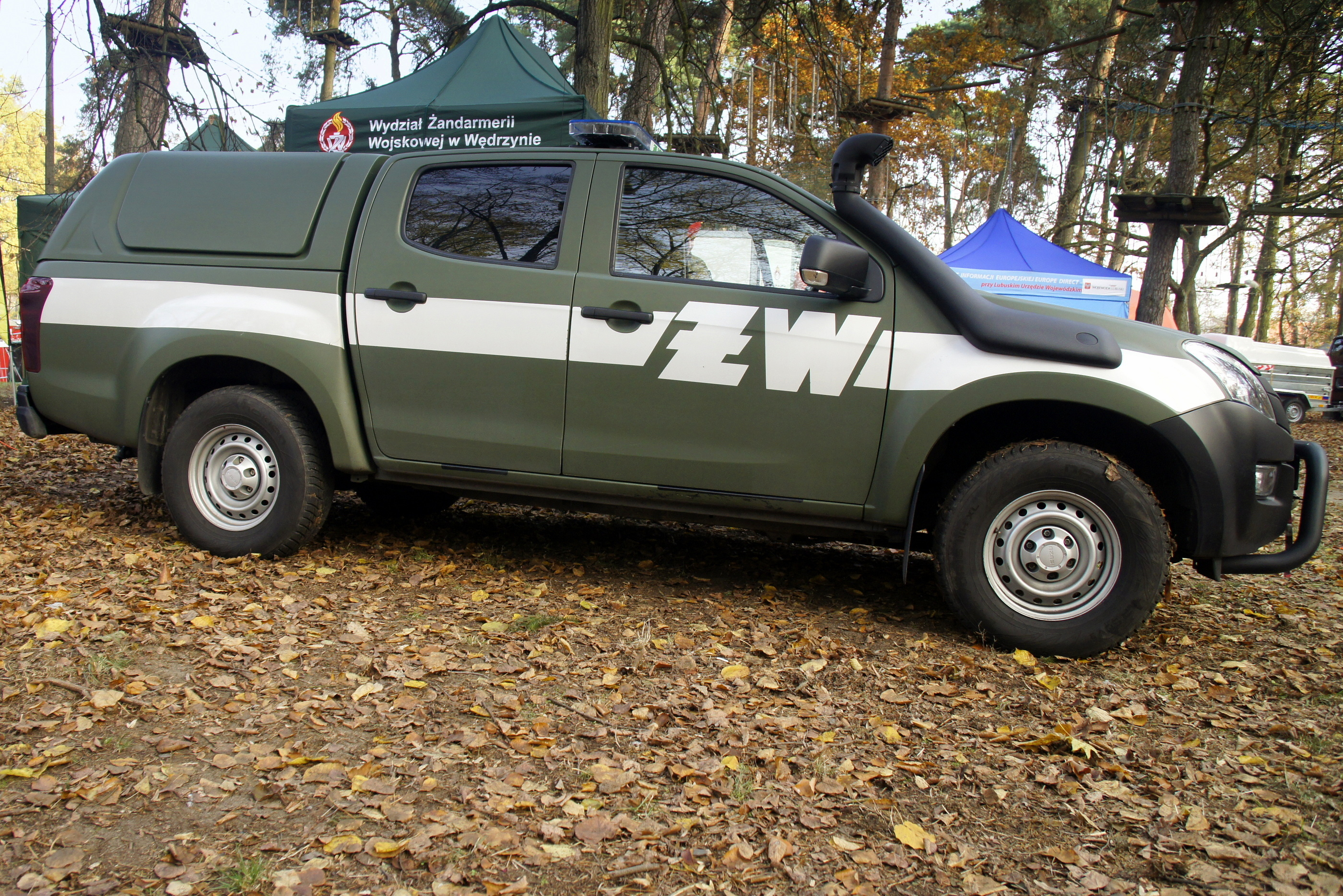
An Isuzu D-Max of the Polish ŻW.

==== Russia ====
The Military Automobile Inspection (VAI), the traffic police unit of the Military Police of Russia utilizes silver patrol cars with blue striping for their duties, similar to the Police of Russia fleet. Regular and tactical vehicles are olive green with red stripes and blue stripes for transport vehicles.

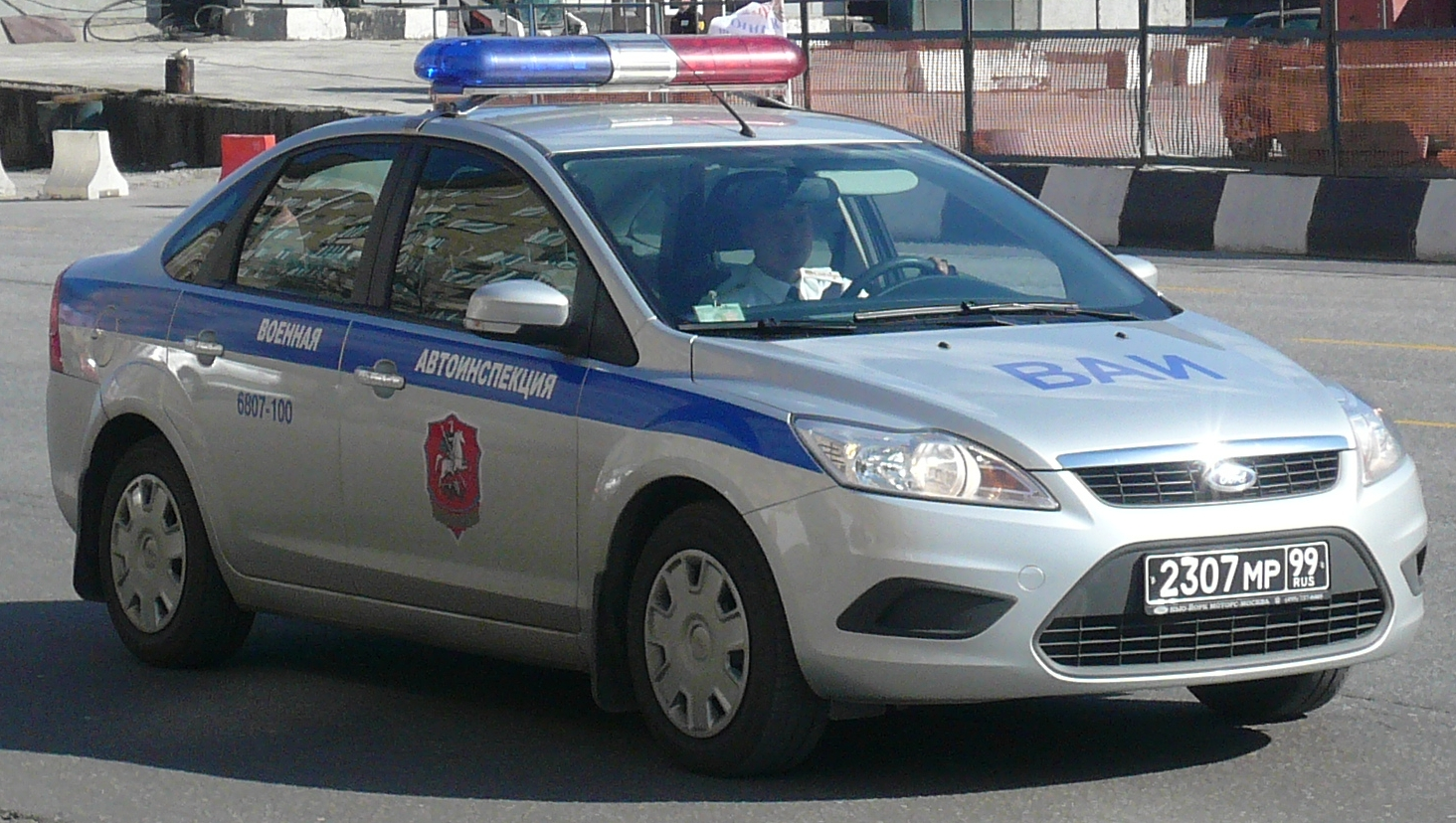
A VAI Ford Focus patrol car.

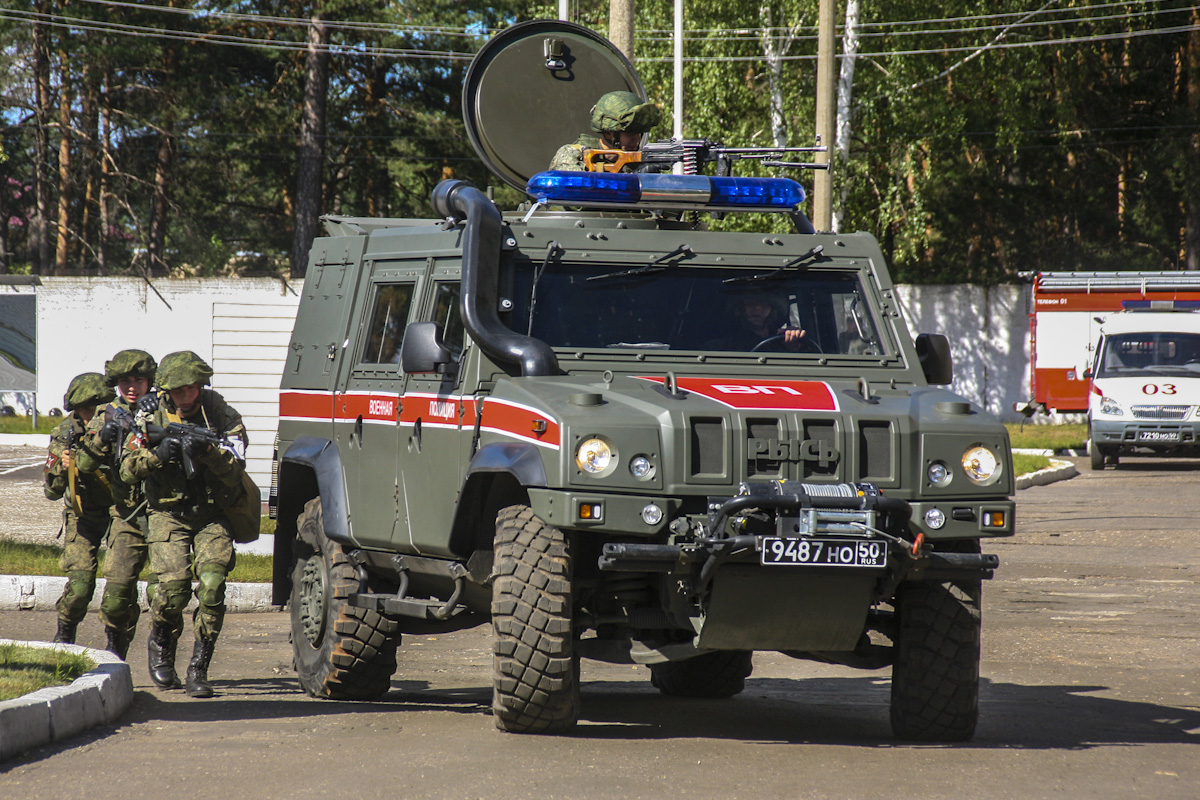
An Iveco LMV Lynx tactical vehicle.

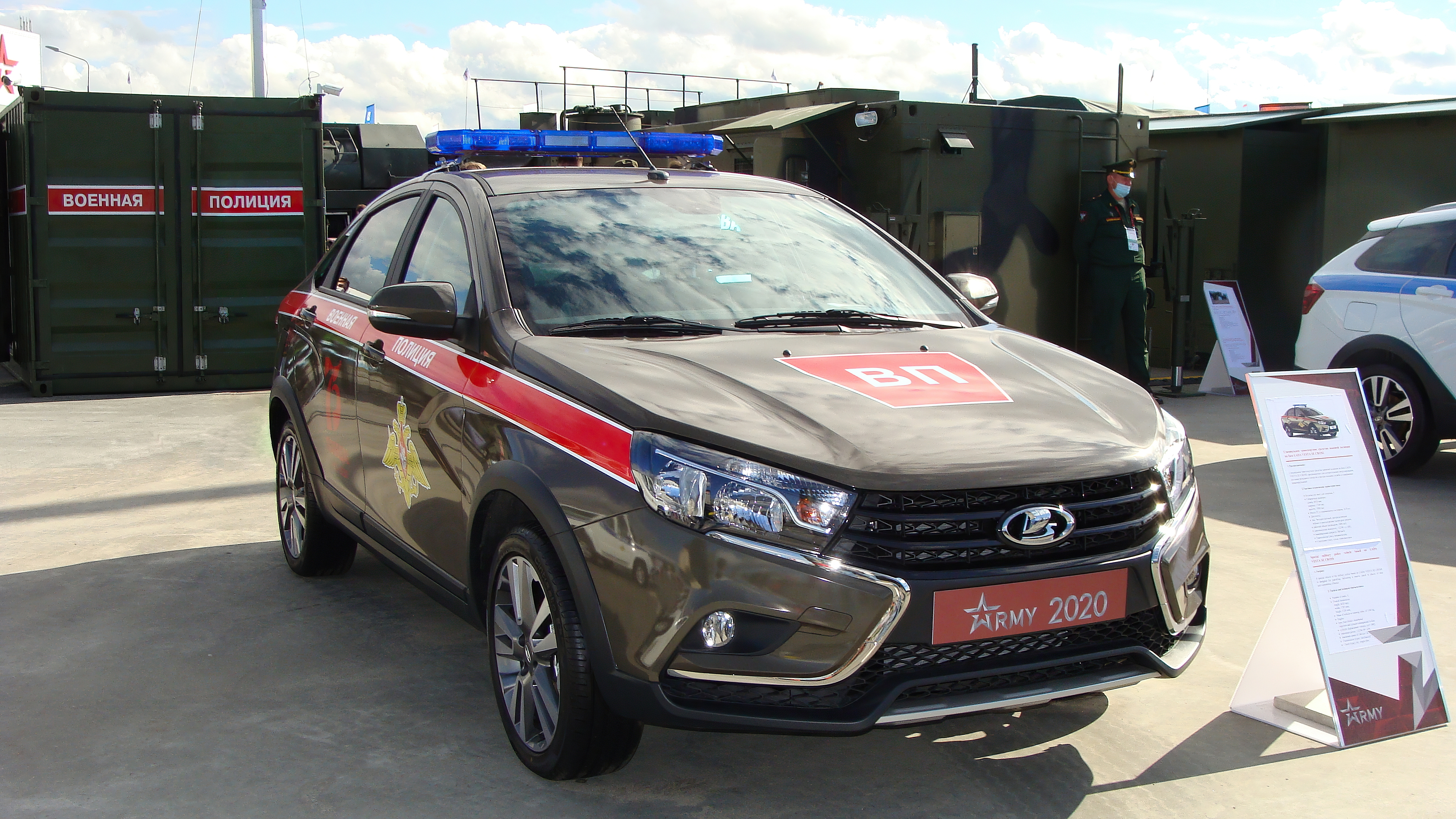
A Lada Vesta patrol car

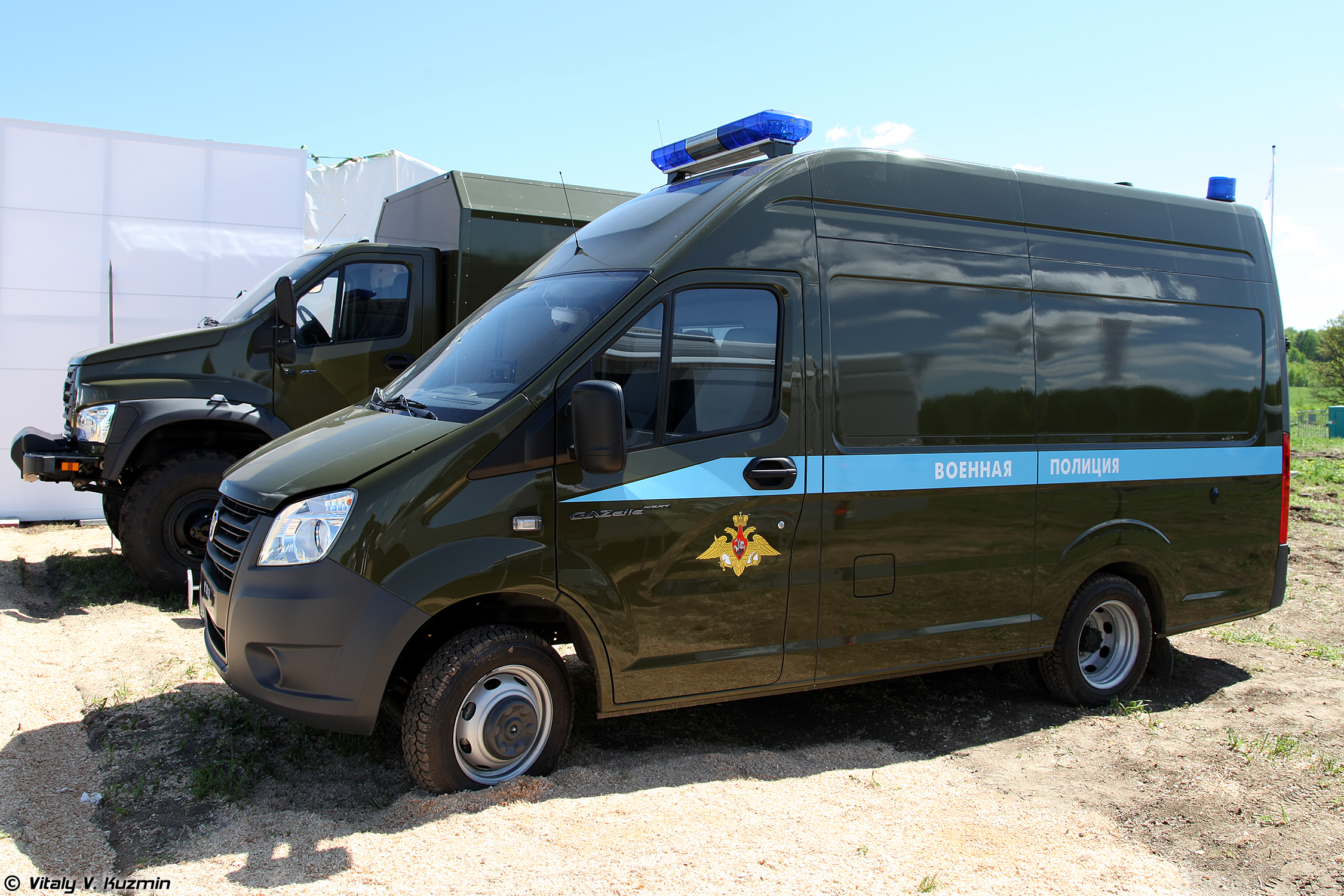
A GAZelle NEXT van

==== United Kingdom ====
When in the field, members of the service police organisations use Land Rovers with typical police equipment and signs reading "MILITARY POLICE". When in garrison or on-shore, they use regular civilian-type patrol cars, but with appropriate RMP, RAFP or RNP markings. Special Investigation Branches may utilise unmarked patrol cars in their duties.

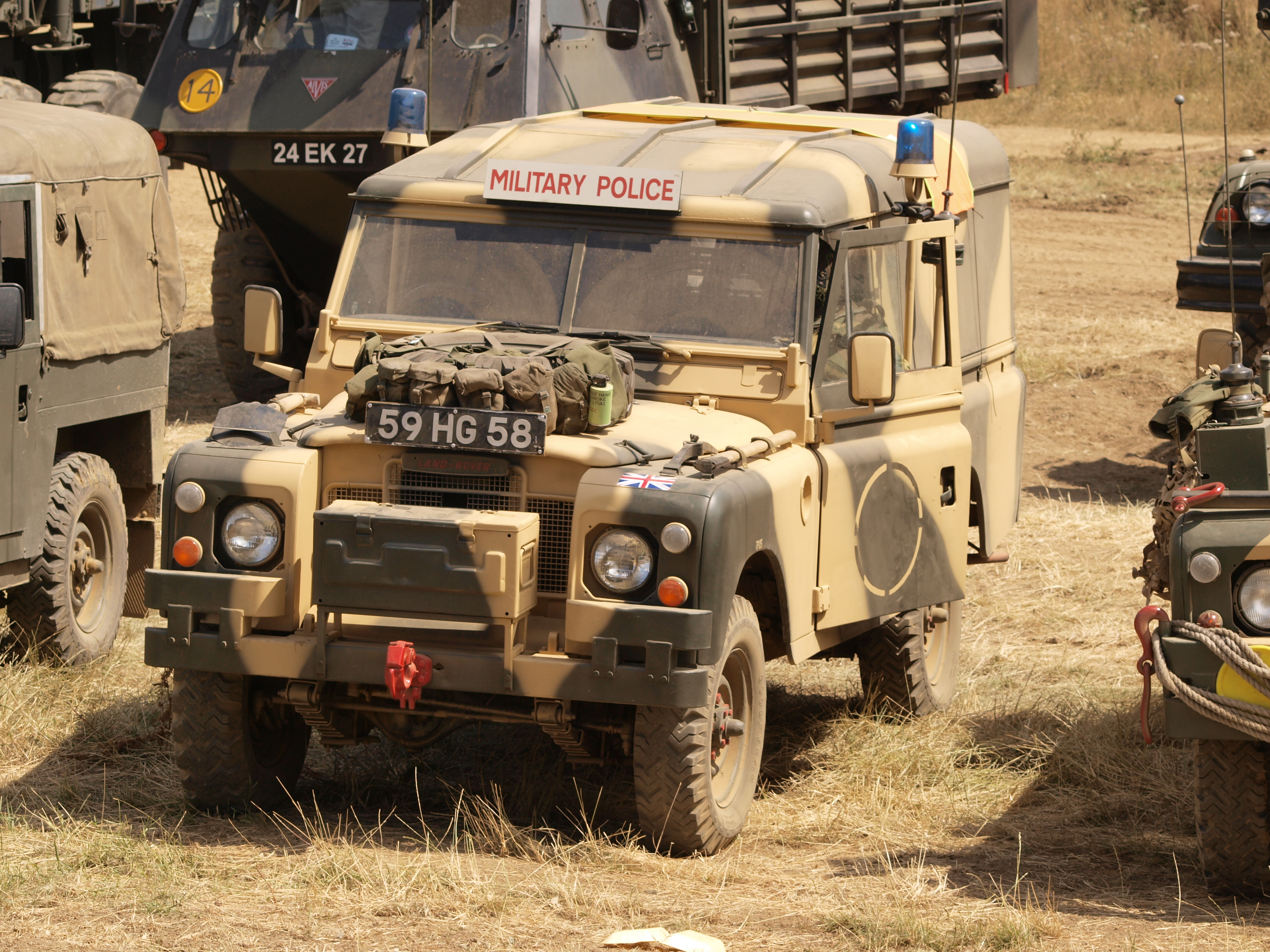
A military police Land Rover of the UK.

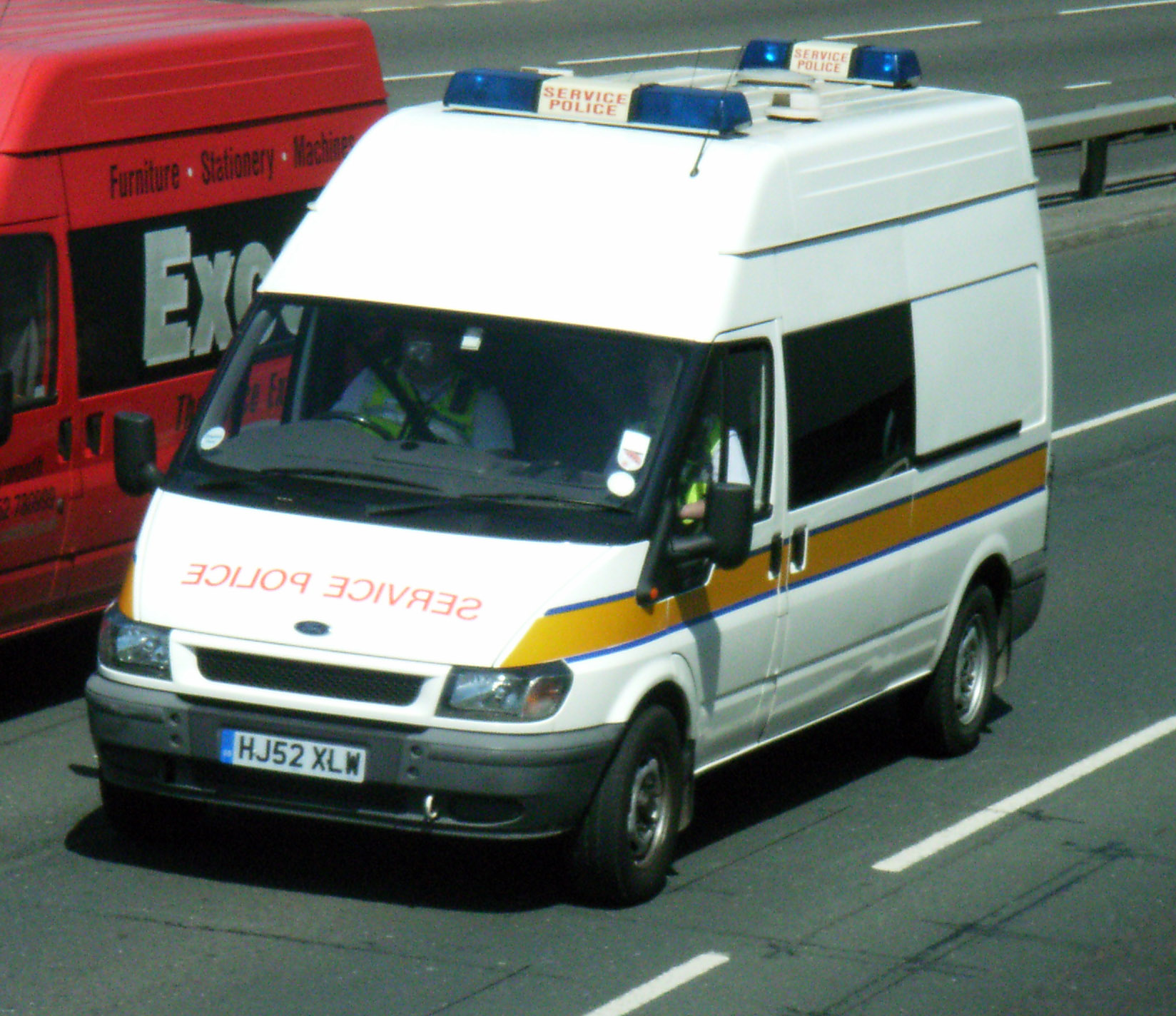
A Ford Transit (2000) of the service police of the UK.

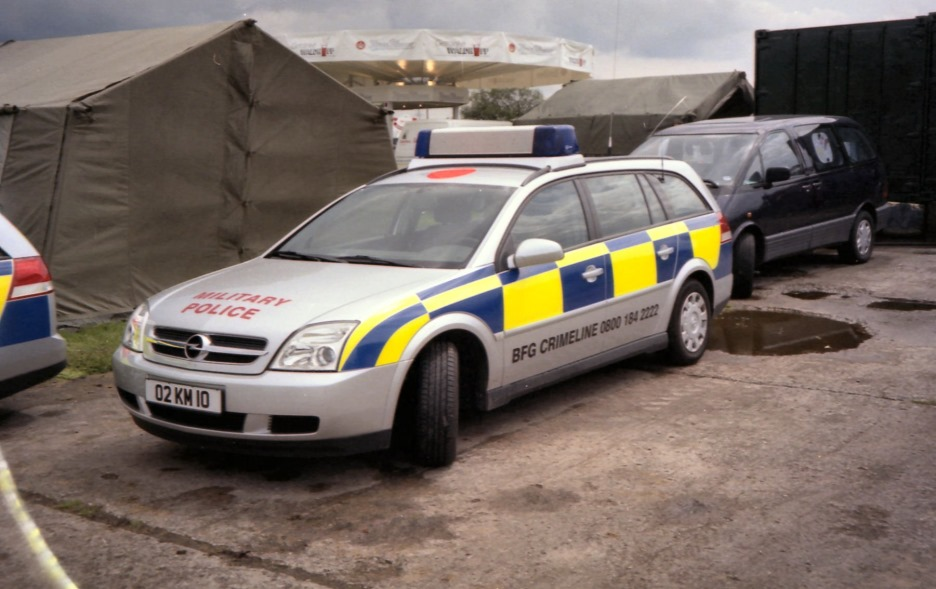
An Opel Vectra patrol car used by the Royal Military Police in Germany.

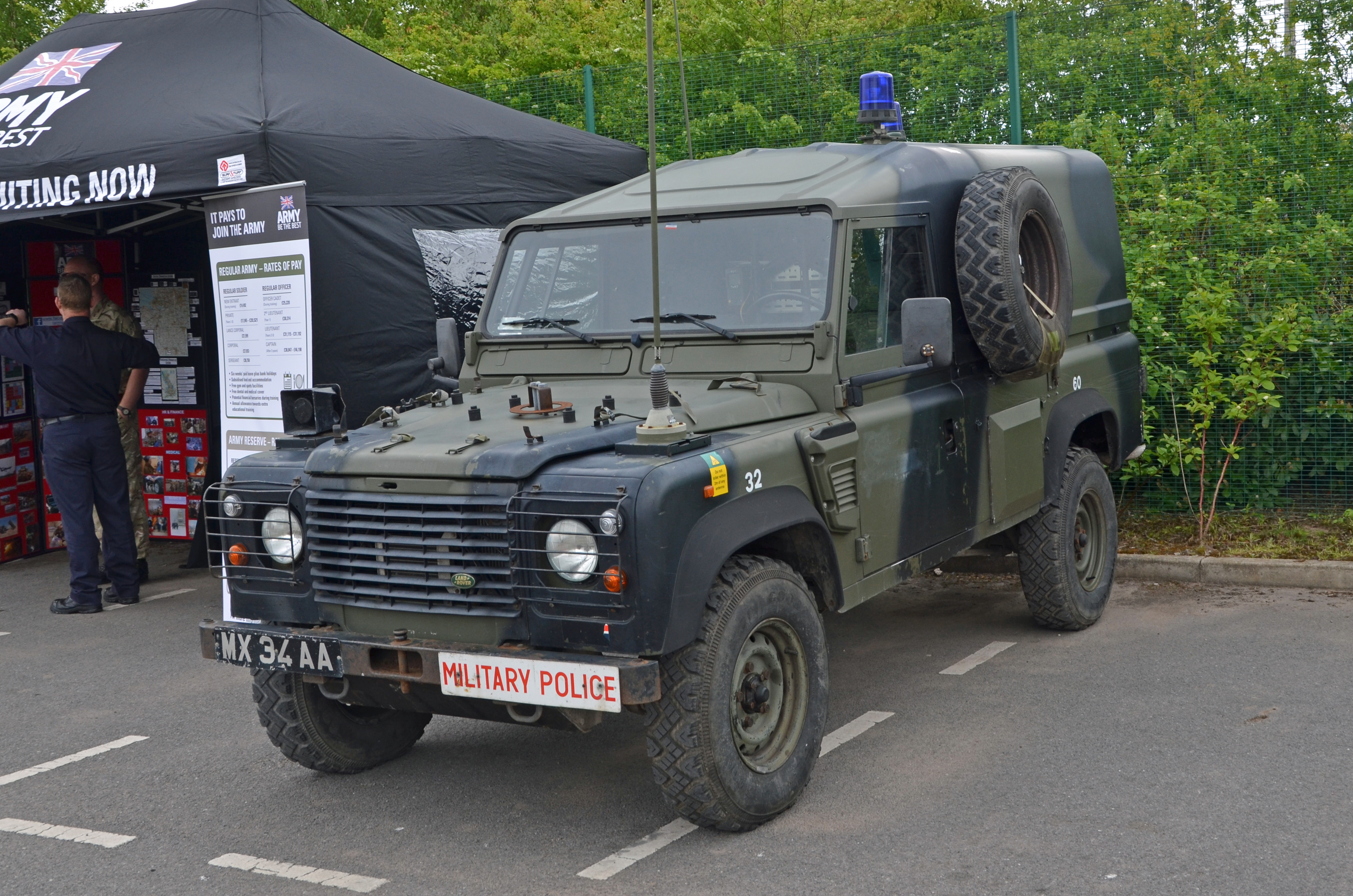
A Royal Military Police Land Rover Defender.

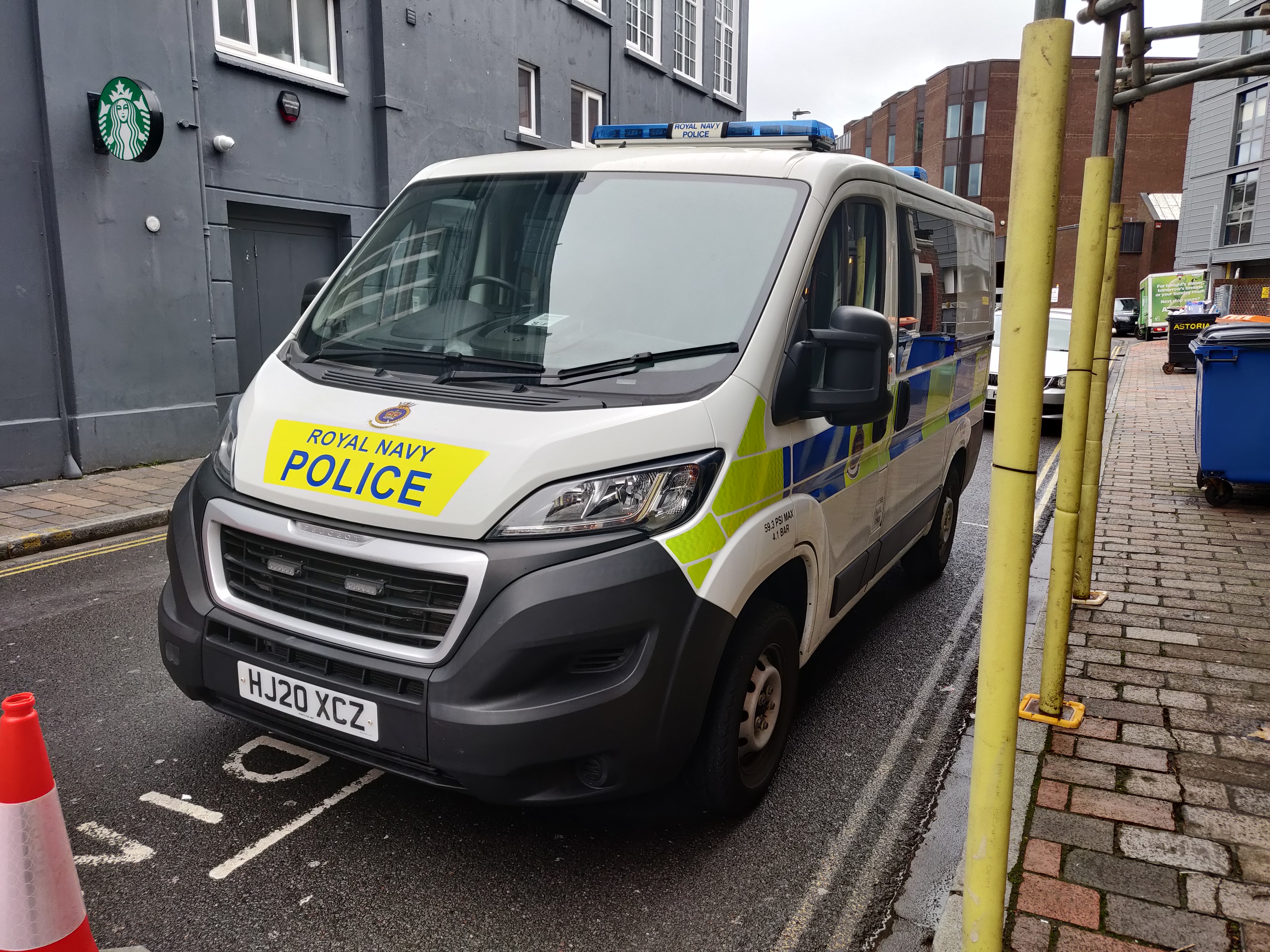
A Peugeot Jumper van of the Royal Navy Police.

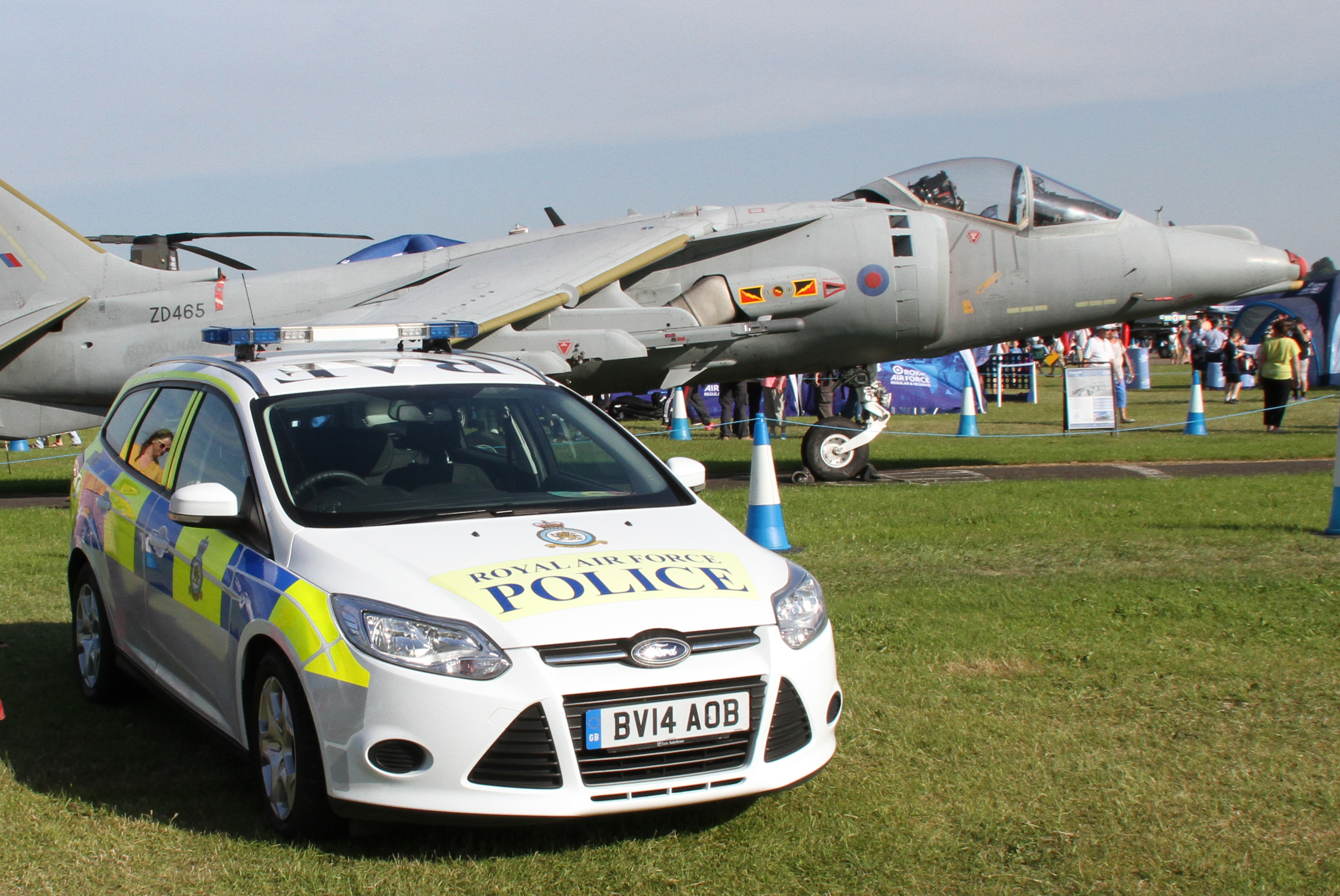
A Ford Focus Mk III of the Royal Air Force Police.

=== Oceania ===
==== Australia ====
The Royal Australian Corps of Military Police is the branch of the Australian Army responsible for military police duties. The 1st Military Police Battalion is equipped with Mercedes G-Wagons with the letters “MP” painted on the side. The Joint Military Police Unit utilise white patrol vehicles with blue and white Sillitoe tartan markings and "Military Police" written in red. The Naval Police Coxswain Branch of the Royal Australian Navy and Royal Australian Air Force Police use similar patrol cars, with "Naval Police" and "Service Police" written instead of "Military Police," respectively.

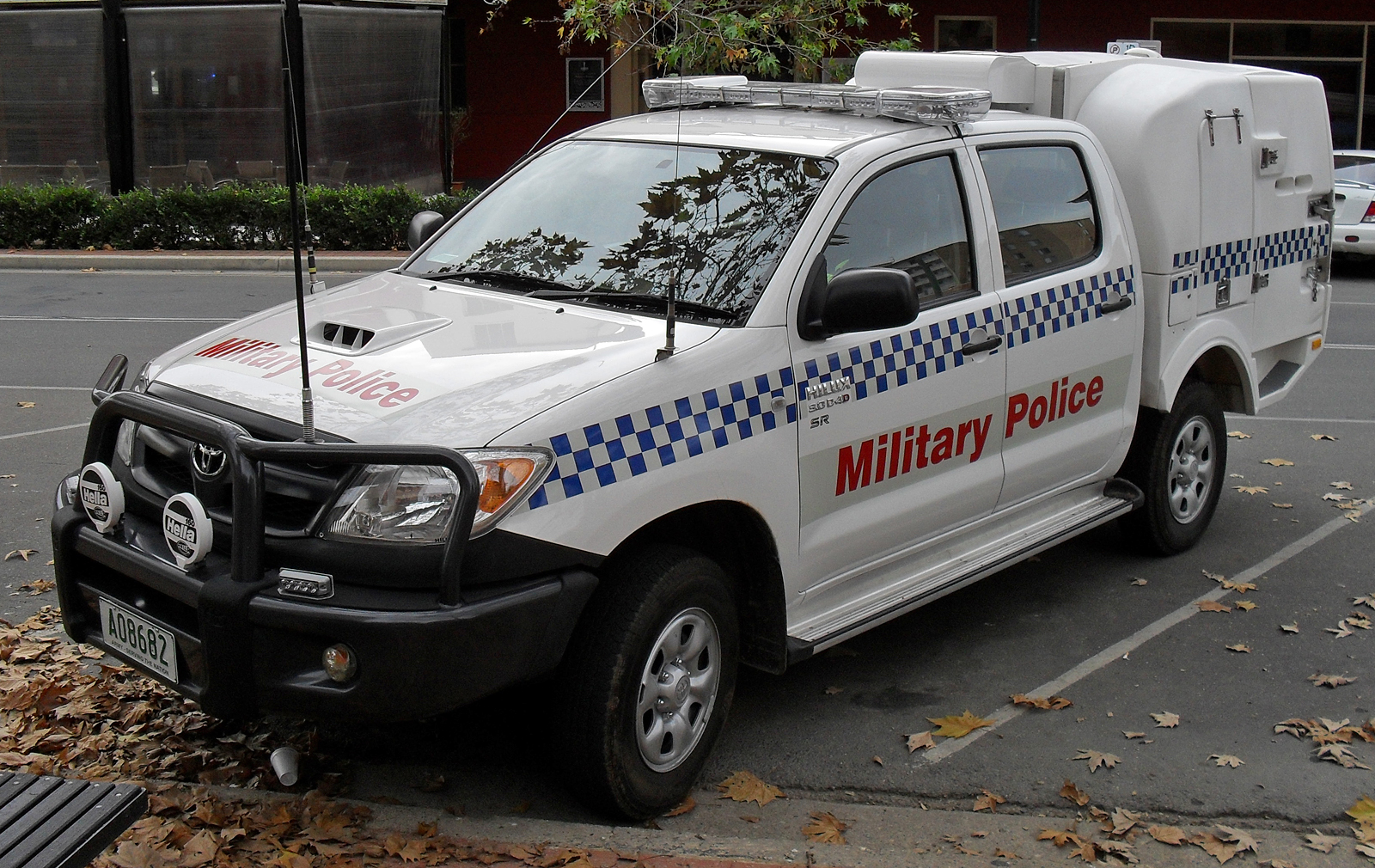
A 2005–2008 Toyota Hilux used by the Royal Australian Corps of Military Police.

== Gallery ==
Military police vehicles around the world

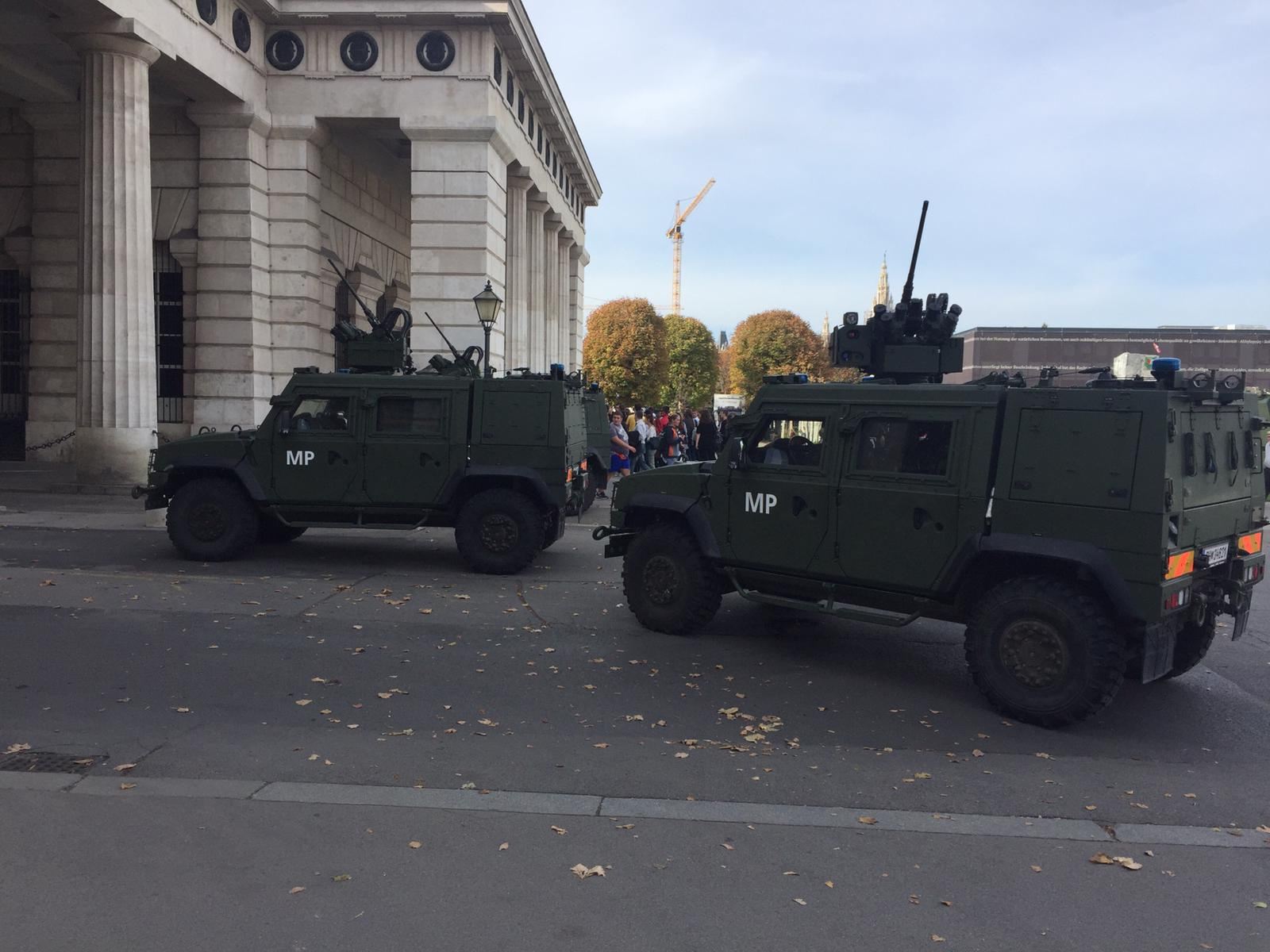
Iveco LMV tactical vehicles of the Austrian Military Police.

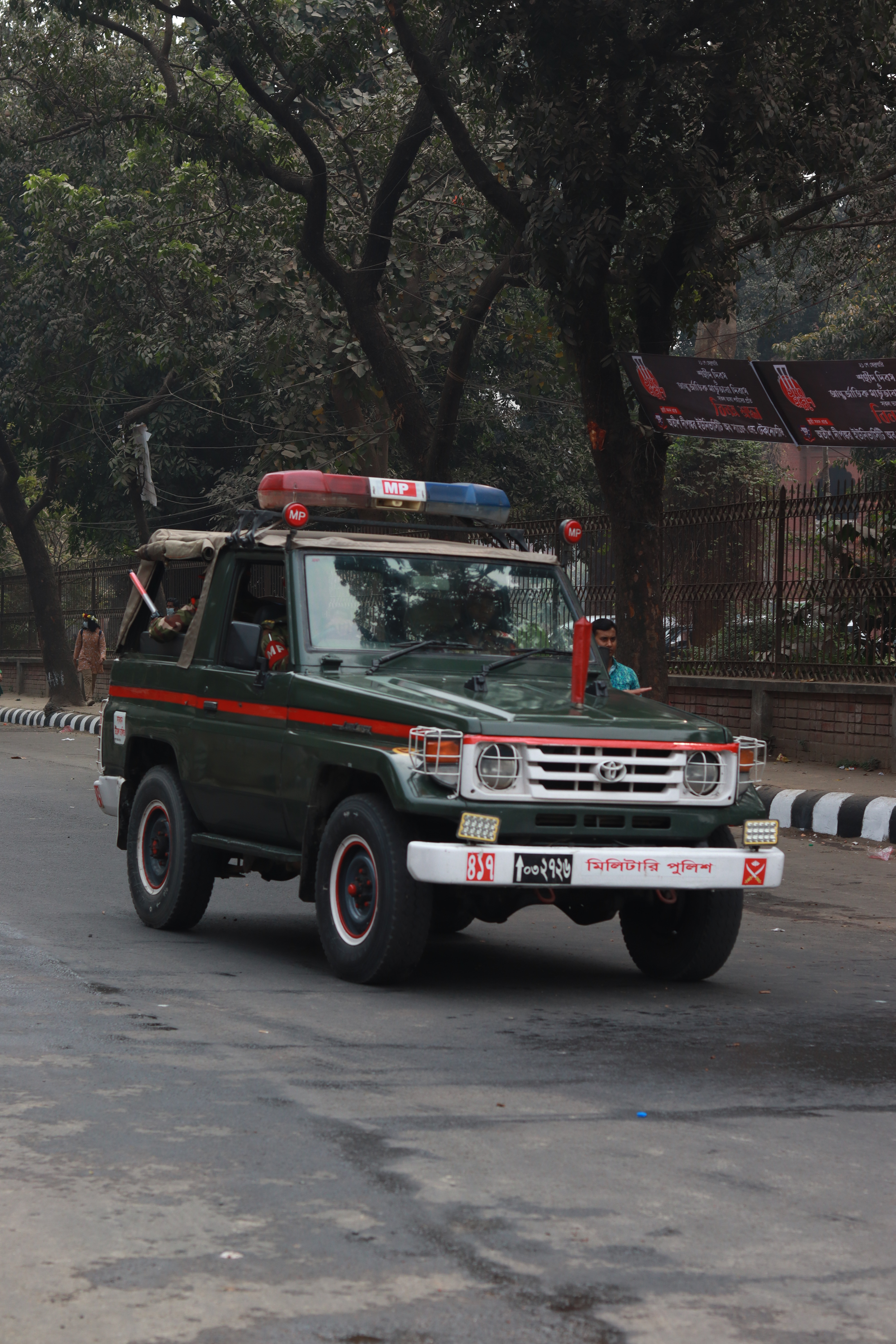
A Toyota Land Cruiser Prado military police vehicle of Bangladesh.

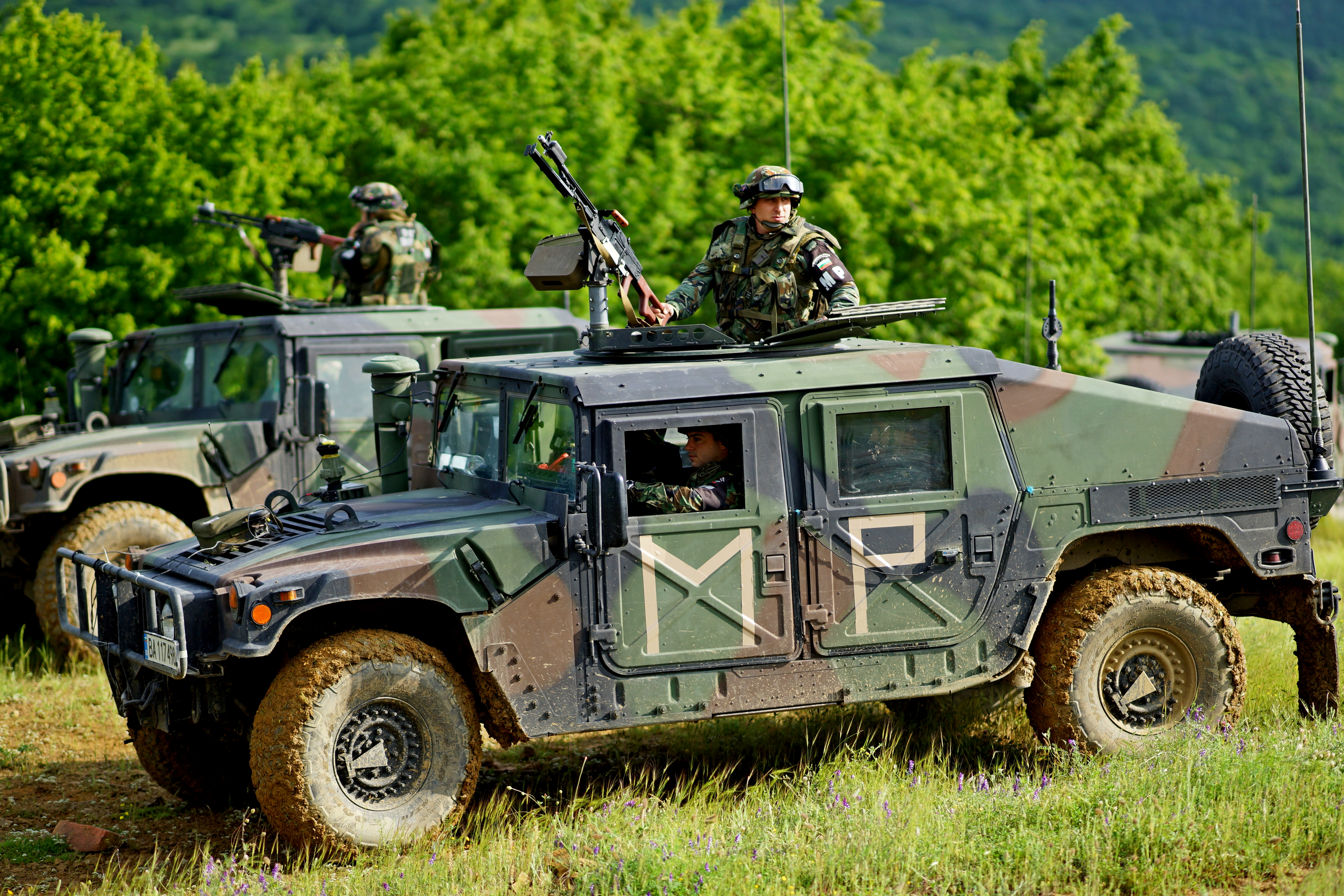
A Humvee of the military police of Bulgaria.

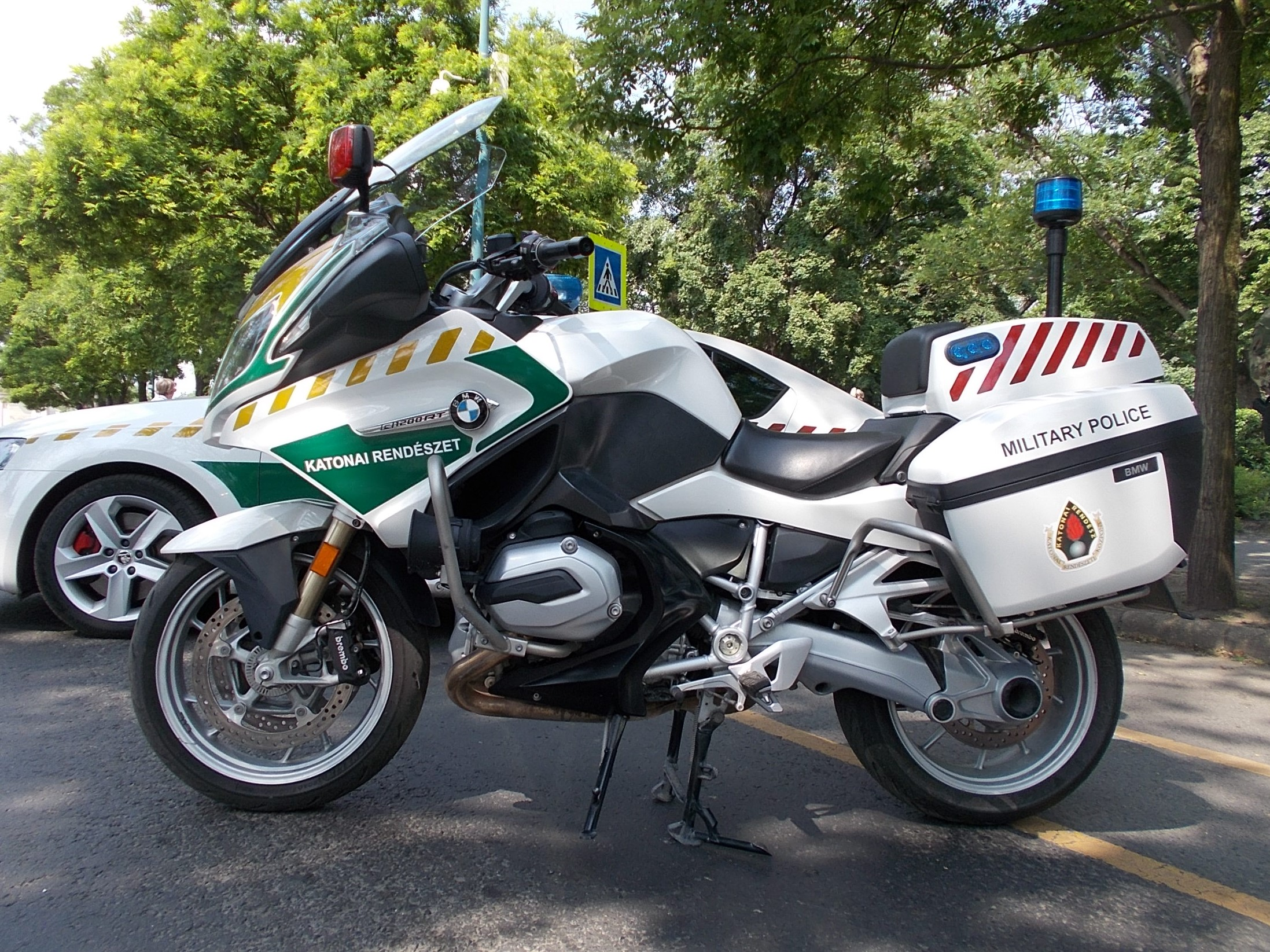
A BMW R1200RT of the Hungarian Katonai Rendészet

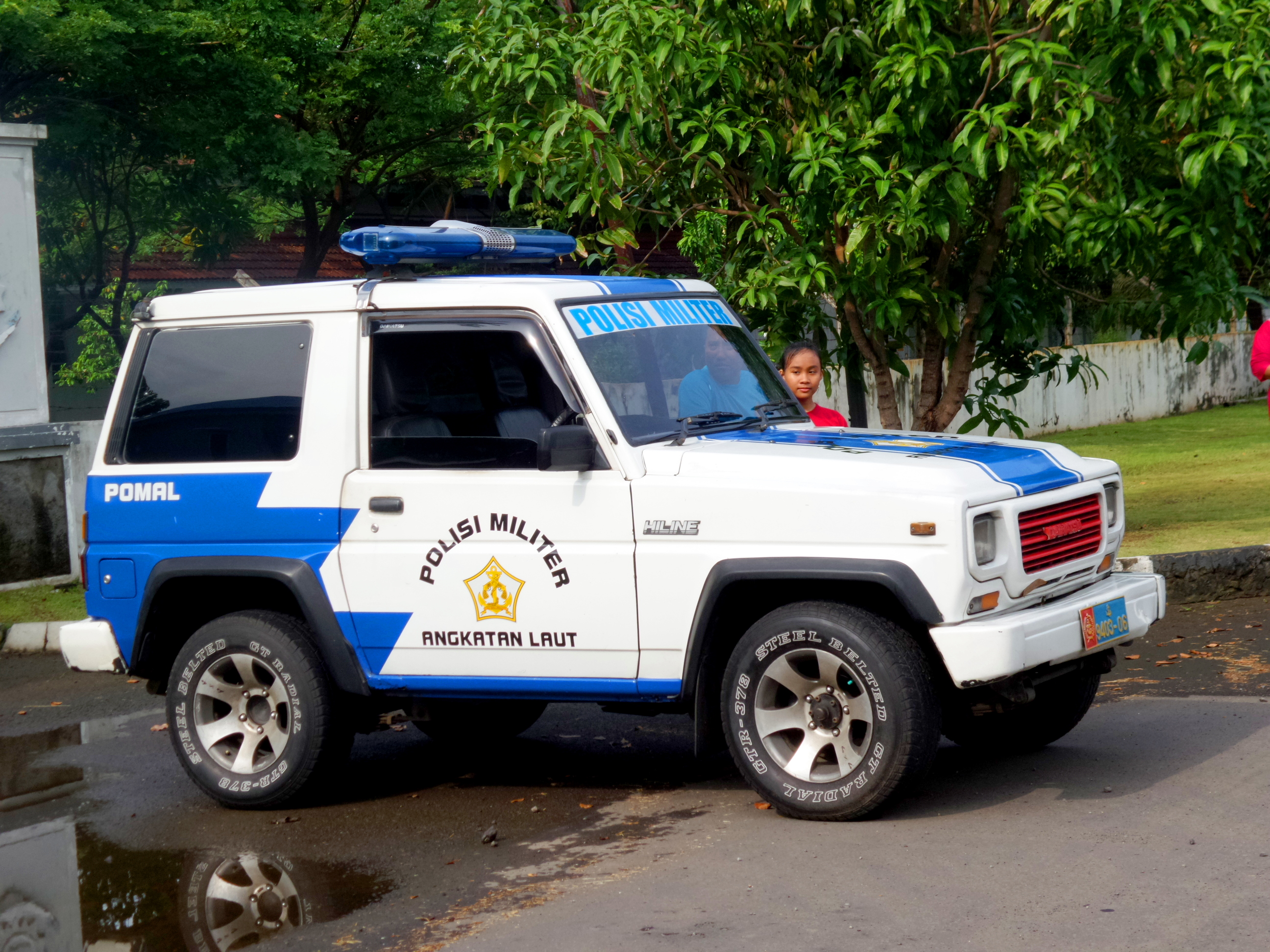
A Daihatsu Hi-Line of the Indonesian Navy Military Police.

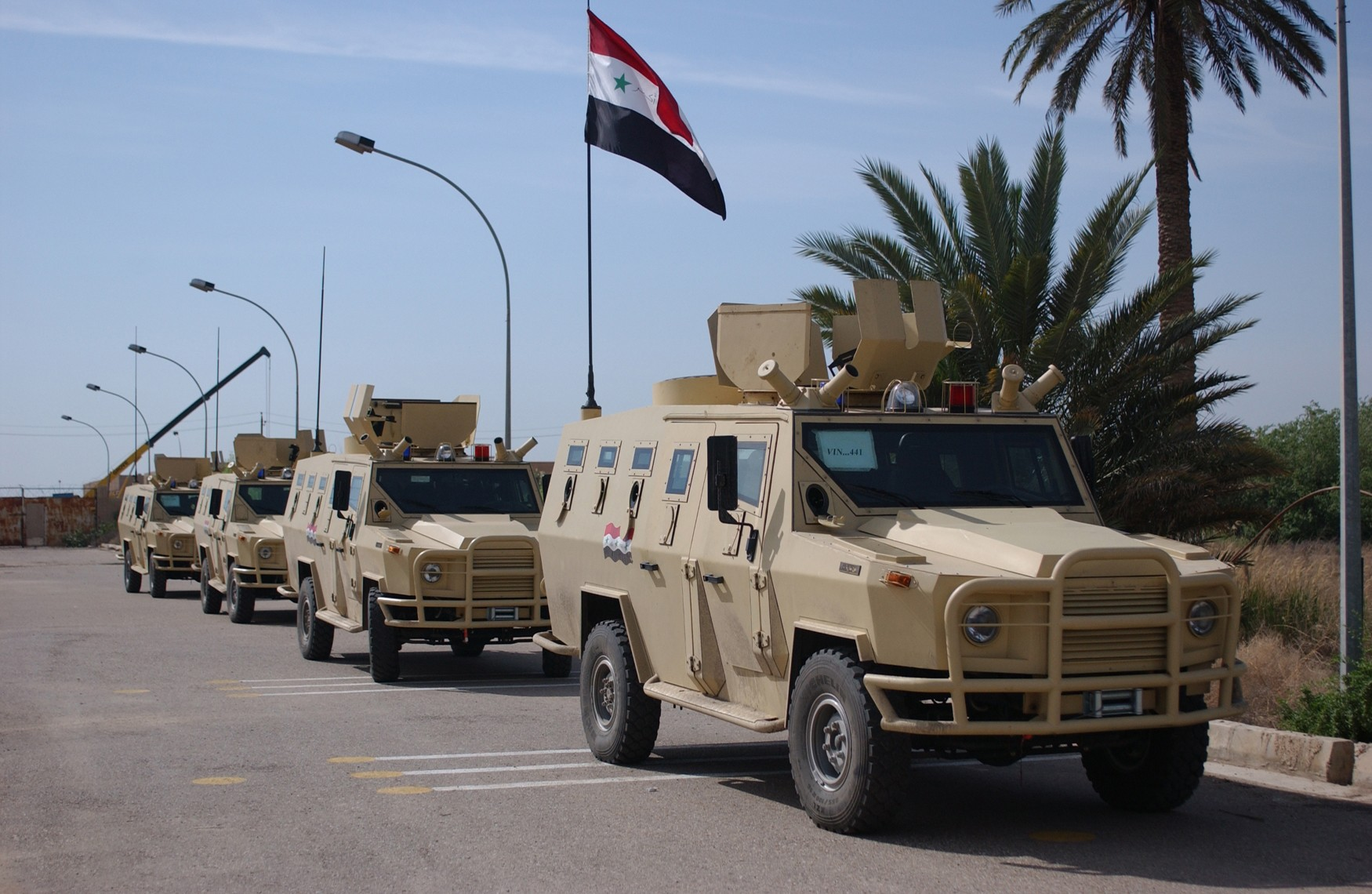
Dzik-3 infantry mobility vehicles of the 6th Iraqi Army Division's military police company.

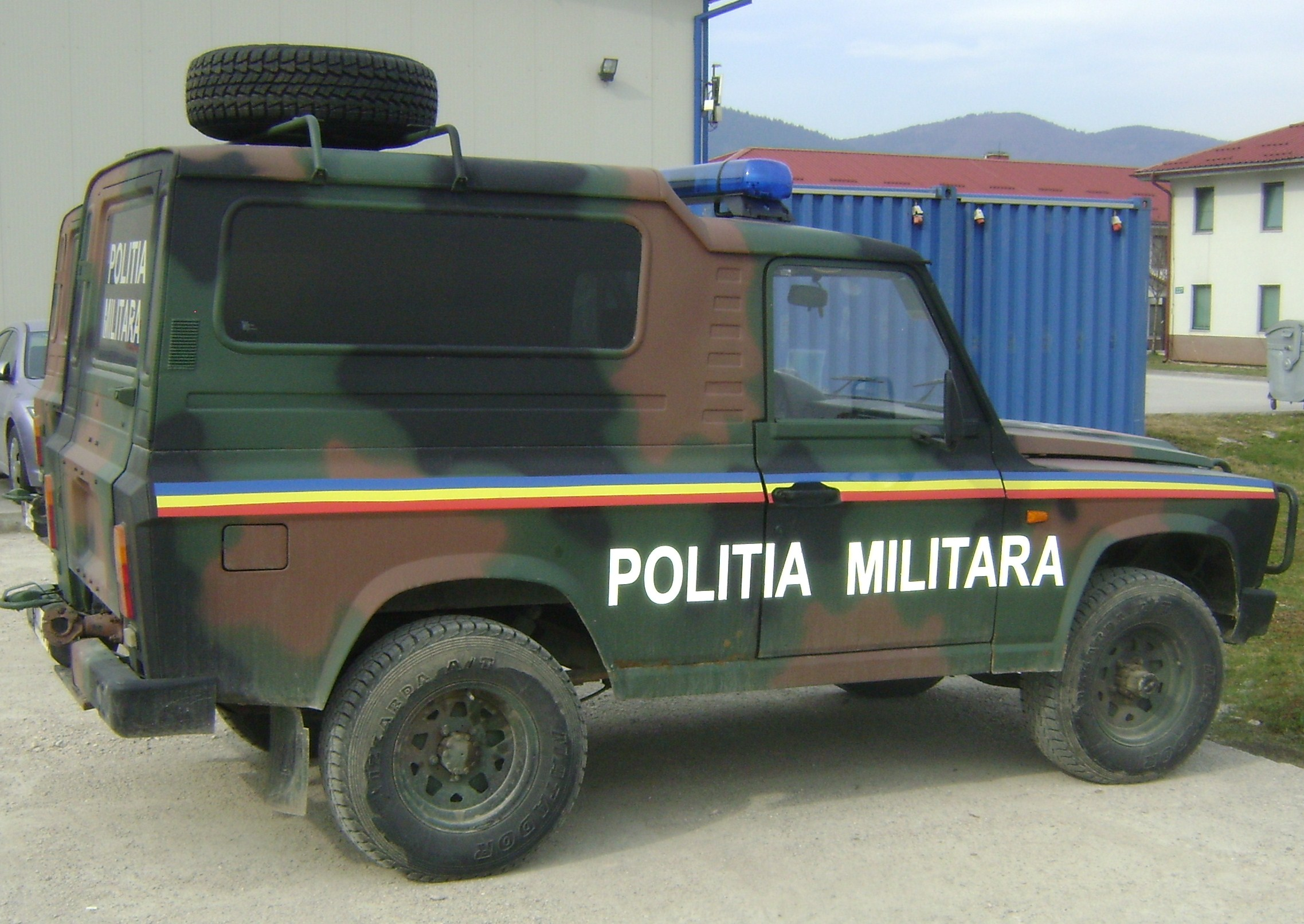
An ARO 24 Series of the Romanian Military Police.

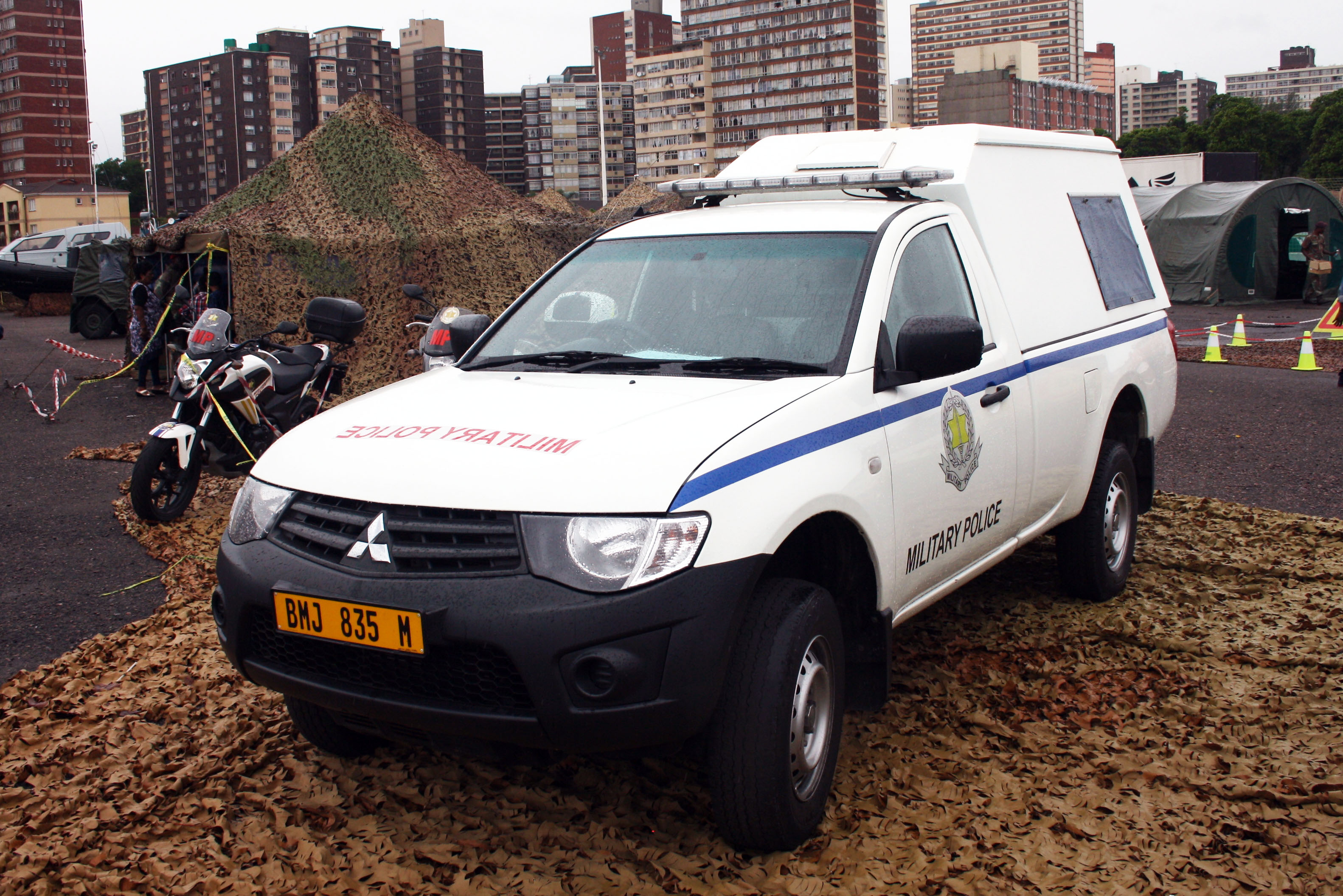
A Mitsubishi Triton of the South African Military Police.

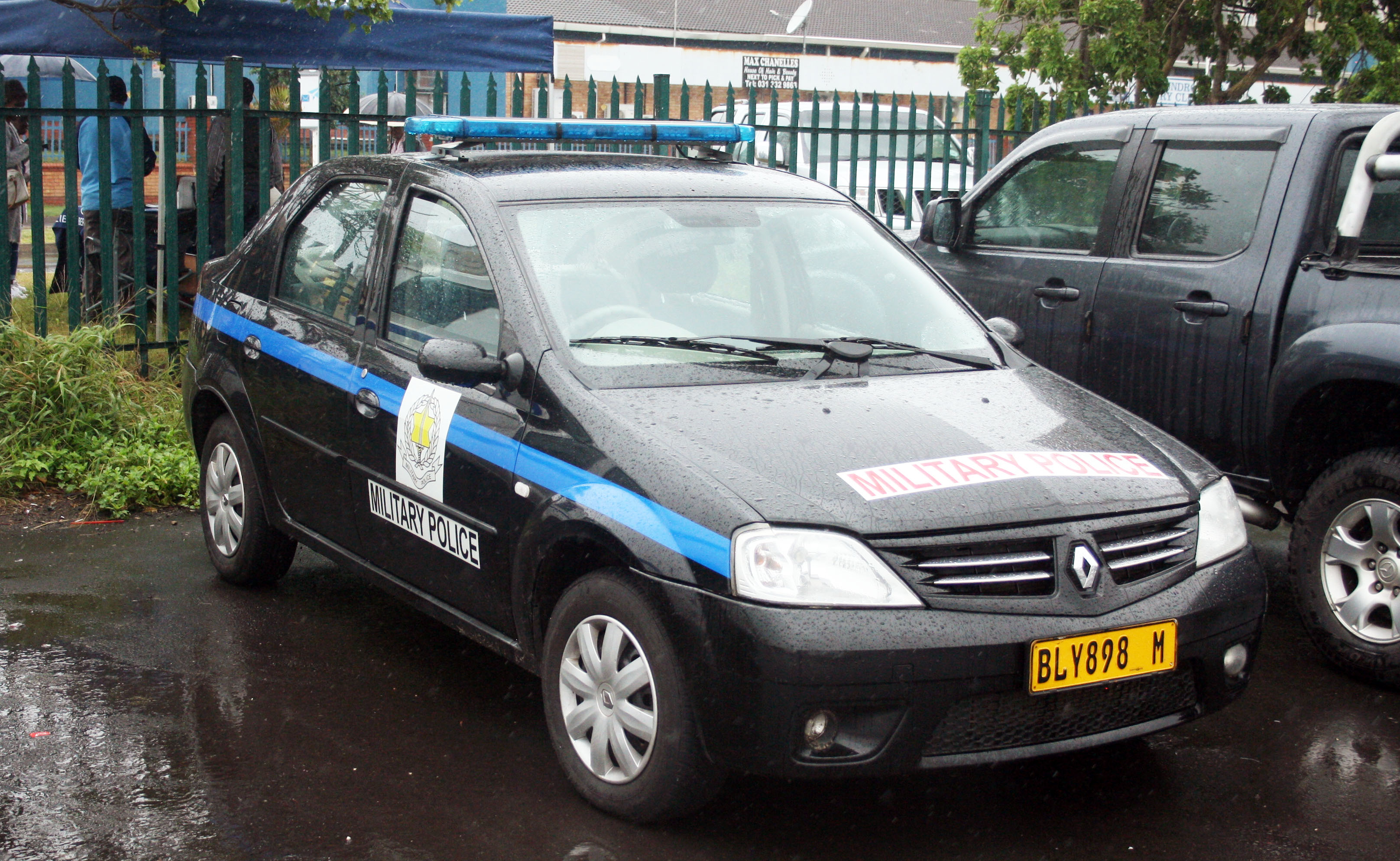
A Renault Logan of the South African Military Police.

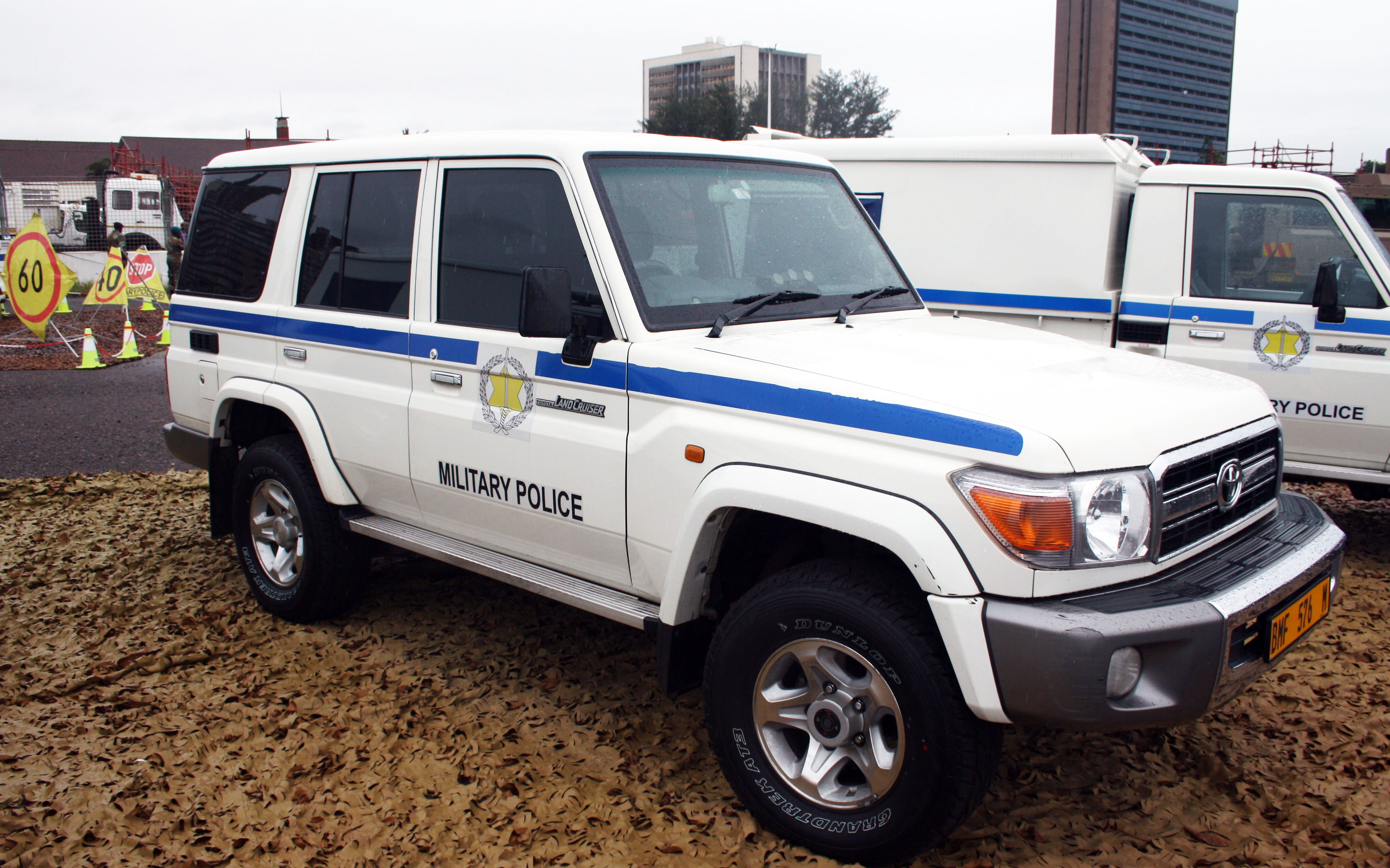
A Toyota Land Cruiser of the South African Military Police.

== See also ==
- Military vehicle
- Police transport
