= List of equipment of the Swiss Army =

This is a list of equipments, vehicles and aircraft used by the Swiss Army.

== Infantry equipment ==
=== Infantry weapons ===
==== Small arms ====
| Model | Image | Origin | Type | Calibre | Notes |
Knives
| Soldatenmesser 08 | | Switzerland | Swiss Army knife | – | Mass production started in December 2008, and first issued in 2009. |
| Bajonett Mod. 1990 | | Switzerland | Bayonet | – | Wenger knife. |
Sidearms
| SIG P 220; Pistol 75 | | Switzerland | Semi-automatic pistol | 9×19mm Parabellum | It replaced the Sig P210. It has been replaced in some specialised functions by the Pistol 03, and by the troops with the Pistol 12/15, but some are still in use today. |
| SIG Pro SPC 2009; Pistol 03 | | Switzerland | Semi-automatic pistol | 9×19mm Parabellum | Partial successor to the Pistol 75 in some special functions, this weapon was not attributed to the troop but to the units, such as the special forces (Swiss Grenadiers, ARD 10, FSK-17) and the military police. |
| Glock 17 - Gen 4 Pistol 12/15 Standard | | Austria | Semi-automatic pistol | 9×19mm Parabellum | Successor to the Pistol 03 in special functions, and successor to the Pistol 75 as the standard issued pistol in the Swiss Army. This weapon is issued to career officers, non-commissioned officers, special forces (Swiss Grenadiers, ARD 10, FSK-17) as a secondary weapon. |
| Glock 26; Pistol 12 Kurz | | Austria | Semi-automatic pistol | 9×19mm Parabellum | Glock 26 gen 4, partial successor to the Pistol 03 and the Pistol 75 as the short variant of the pistol in the Swiss Army. It is the primary weapon for the military police and mechanics in the army. |
Submachine guns
| Heckler & Koch MP5; Maschinenpistole | | West Germany; Germany; Switzerland | Submachine gun | 9×19mm Parabellum | Several variants used over times to answer specific needs.: HK 5 A5, latest variant, in use with the military police and the special forces, with modular features (sound suppressor, red dot, Picatinny rail; Brügger & Thomet AG variant produced under licence; MP5SD, exclusively for the special forces with a fixed silencer |
| B&T MP9-N; Maschinenpistole 14 (Mp 14) | | Switzerland | Submachine gun | 9×19mm Parabellum | Used as personal defence weapon for units unlikely to see combat, such as cooks and headquarters staff. |
Assault rifles and carabines
| SIG550; Sturmgewehr 90 (Stgw 90) | | Switzerland | Assault rifle | GP90 (5.56×45mm Swiss) | Standard issue assault rifle in service in the Swiss Army, successor to the Stgw 57, it was introduced from 1988. A total of 600,000 rifles have been produced for the Swiss Army. |
| SIG552; Sturmgewehr 04 (Stgw 04) | | Switzerland | Carbine | GP90 (5.56×45mm Swiss) | Shortened version of the Sig 550, in use with the Swiss Grenadiers, ARD 10, FSK-17 .It partially replaced the MP5. |
| SIG553; Sturmgewehr 07 (Stgw 07) | | Switzerland | Carbine | GP90 (5.56×45mm Swiss) | Shortened version of the Sig 550, in use with the Swiss Grenadiers, ARD 10, FSK-17 and the Military Police, it partially replaced the SIG552 and the MP5. |
| LMT MARS-L; Sturmgewehr 25 / Sturmgewehr 25 Kurz (Stgw 25 / Stgw 25K) | | United States | Assault rifle / Carbine | GP90 (5.56×45mm Swiss) | Used with the AAD 10 (special forces) and the MP Spez Det (military police special detachment). Selected in 2025 in a collaboration between LMT and SWISSLOXX. Specifications: Barrel length: Stgw 25: 16 inches; Stgw 25K: 12 inches; Accessories: Red dot: Aimpoint Micro T-2 (on B&T montage skeleton QD 59mm; Magnifier: Aimpoint 3X-PMag-1; B&T Unigrip QD Kurz CT; B&T weapon mounted light |
Machine guns
| FN Minimi; Leichtes Maschinengewehr 05 (Lmg 05) | | Belgium | LMG | GP90 (5.56×45mm Swiss) | Equipped with Eotech HWS holographic sight. Orders: 1472 in 2020; 400 in 2021 |
| W+F MG 51/71; Maschinengewehr 51 (Mg 51/71) | | Switzerland | GPMG | GP 11 (7.5×55mm Swiss) | Manufactured by the Waffenfabrik Bern, it is a derivative of the MG 42. It is used as: Secondary weapon on the Panzer 87 tank; Primary weapon on the Mowag Eagle 1 / 2 (Aufklfz 93 and 97), installed on the MBK2 observation turret. |
| W+F MG 51/00; Maschinengewehr 51 (Mg 51/00) | | Switzerland | GPMG | GP 11 (7.5×55mm Swiss) | Manufactured by the Waffenfabrik Bern, it is a derivative of the MG 42. It is used as: Secondary weapon on the CV90 |
| M2 Browning; Maschinengewehr 63/93 (Mg 63/93) | | Belgium; United States | HMG | 12.7×99mm NATO | Equipped on the MOWAG Piranha II in the Swiss Army, mounted on KUKA Type 616-A1CH turrets. |
| M2 Browning; Maschinengewehr 07 (Mg 07) | | Belgium; United States | HMG | 12.7×99mm NATO | Used with Kongsberg Protector RS4 RCWS on the following vehicles: Mowag Piranha I "Kdo Pz"; Mowag Piranha III, several variants; Mowag Piranha IV, "PiPz 21"; Mowag Piranha IV, "Mörser 16"; Mowag Duro IIIP "GMTF"; Mowag Duro IIIP "A/B/C"; Mowag Eagle V "EOR"; Mowag Eagle V 6×6 "TASYS"; Also mounted on a manual turret on the LIV (SO) Serval of the ARD 10. |
Designated marksman rifles and sniper rifles
| SIG 550; Sturmgewehr 90 (Zf Stgw 90) | | Switzerland | DMR | GP90 (5.56×45mm Swiss) | Designated marksman rifle in infantry troops, with an expected range of 600 m (660 yd). It is the standard Stgw90, equipped with a Kern 4x24 Zielfernrohr scope. |
| SIG751 SAPR / SIG 751 SAPR; Zielfernrohr Sturmgewehr 12 (Zf Stgw 12) | – | Switzerland | DMR | 7.62×51mm NATO | Used with the AAD 10 (special forces) and the MP Spez Det (military police special detachment). Specifications: Scopes: Schmidt & Bender 5-20×50 PM II; Leupold Mark 8 CQBSS 1.1-8x24.; 14-inch barrel with a RC2 762 suppressor attached through a Surefire SOCOM muzzle deviceA successor / complementary weapon entered service with the LMT MWS. |
| LMT MWS MARS-H; Zielfernrohr Sturmgewehr 20 (Zf Stgw 20) | | United States | DMR | 6.5×48mm Creedmore / 7.62×51mm NATO | Used with the AAD 10 (special forces) and the MP Spez Det (military police special detachment). Specifications: ERATAC mount with: Scope: Schmidt & Bender 5-20×50 PM II Ultra Short; Aimpoint T1 red dot; Laser fire control system: Wilcox RAPTAR; 16-inch stainless steel 5R barrel with a SureFire WARCOMP-762 muzzle device; Long MLC M-LOK upper receiver |
| Sako TRG-42; Scharfschützengewehr 04 (SSGw 04) | | Finland | Bolt action sniper rifle | 8.6×70mm Gw Pat 04, Gw Pat 05 HK, Gw Pat 06 TC | 196 ordered in 2004, all delivered by end 2005 It is being replaced by the Scharfschützengewehr 18. Specifications: Scope: Schmidt & Bender 3-12 scope (3-12×50 PMII); Night vision device: Simrad Optronics RLV 05 |
| Sako TRG-42 A1; Scharfschützengewehr 18 (SSGw 18) | | Finland | Bolt action sniper rifle | 8.6×70mm Gw Pat 04, Gw Pat 05 HK, Gw Pat 06 TC | Successor to the SSGw 04, being replaced from 2021 to 2023 and mentioned in the Armament Programme 2021. Specifications: Scope: Schmidt & Bender 5-20×50 PMII Ultra Short; Night vision device: unknown variant; Chassis: APO Saber Alloy SKO-42A1 MOD-1; Laser fire control system: Wilcox RAPTAR; Surefire SOCOM338-Ti suppressor |
| PGM Hécate II; Präzisions Schützengewehr 04 (PSg 04) | | France | Bolt action anti-material rifle | 12.7×99mm NATO | 20 ordered, and used by the special forces (ARD 10 and the Mountain Grenadiers). It is equipped with the scope LTE J10 F1 8-10x from Scrome. The ammunition used is the Panzer Spreng-Patrone 92. |
Miscellaneous firearms
| Remington Model 870; Mehrzweckgewehr | | United States | Pump action shotgun | 12 gauge | Used by the infantry as a breaching tool, and also the military police, grenadiers, aviation field surveillance troops. |
| Heckler & Koch P2A1; Raketenpistole 78HK | | Switzerland; Germany | Signal pistol | 26.5mm | Licensed production by the Waffenfabrik Bern. |

==== Explosive weapons ====
| Model | Image | Origin | Type | Calibre | Notes |
Grenades
| RUAG HG 85 | | Switzerland | Defensive hand grenade / Offensive hand grenade | – | Successor of the HG 43; Purchased with the Armament Programme 1985, acquisition of 1.5 million grenades, and some others for training. Replacement of 1 million detonators with the Armament Programme 2015, budget of CHF 38.9 million. Training and explosive variants used by the army. |
| SIG GL 5040; Gewehraufsatz 97 | | Switzerland | Under barrel grenade launcher | 40×46mm LV | Ordered with the Armament Programme 1997, budget CHF 51 million. 4,0000 launchers ordered and the munitions, delivered by 1999. Used by the grenadiers and fusiliers. |
| B&T GL06; Mehrzweckwerfer 10 | | Switzerland | Grenade launcher | 40×46mm LV | Used by the military police since 2015. |
Man-portable anti-tank systems
| M72 LAW Mk 2 | | Norway; United States | RPG | 72 mm | Ordered with the Armament Programme 2016, budget CHF 2 million. Selected for short-range light armour engagement, to be used by infantry forces.: 500 received in 2018 |
| Panzerfaust 3 | | Germany | RPG | 110 mm | |
| RGW 90 HH | | Germany; Israel; Singapore | Recoilless gun | 90 mm | Ordered with the Armament Programme 2016, budget CHF 89 million. Selected to be used against structures, and vehicle lighter than IFV at rather short range.: 8,000 delivered in 2018 |
| NLAW | | United Kingdom; Sweden; Switzerland | ATGM (short range) | 115 mm (missile body); 150 mm (warhead) | 4,000 ordered with the Armament Programme 2016, budget CHF 140 million. Selected as the future anti-tank missile. Deliveries: 2023: 964 (produced in the UK and in Sweden) |
| BGM-71 TOW-2 | | United States | ATGM | 152 mm | 400 launchers, 12,000 missiles ordered in 1986 (US$209 million). Only used with the tank hunter Piranha 2 6x6, to be retired in the following years. |
Land mines
| Richtladung 96 light | | Switzerland | Directional light mine | – | Can be used against un-protected vehicles up to 50 m (55 yd). Modified after ratification of Ottawa treaty in 2000 to prevent the indiscriminatory effect. |
| Richtladung 96 heavy | | Switzerland | Directional heavy mine | – | Can be used against un-protected vehicles up to 150 m (160 yd) (2 splinters per 1 m^{2} (11 sq ft) at this distance). Modified after ratification of Ottawa treaty in 2000 to prevent the indiscriminatory effect. |
| HPD-2 mine Panzerabwehrmine 88 (Pzaw Mi 88) | | France | Anti-tank mine | – | According to the Swiss government, it complies with the Ottawa treaty as it discriminates weights typical of military vehicle classes. |

==== Personal equipment ====
| Model | Image | Origin | Type | In service since | Quantity (2024) | Notes |
Combat helmet
| Schuberth Gefechtshelm M92; Schutzhelm 04 | | Germany | Combat helmet | 2006 | 105,000 | Ordered with the Armament Programme 2004, CHF35 million budget, to enter service in 2006. |
| Ops-Core FAST Helmet | | United States | Combat helmet | – | – | Used by the Army Reconnaissance Detachment 10. |
| Schuberth Gefechtshelm M100 | – | Germany | Combat helmet | 2024 | – | In use with the EOD units (KAMIR). |
Bulletproof vests
| Modular ballistic protection Ballistischer Körperschutz 18 | | Belgium; Switzerland | Bulletproof vest | 2022 | 100,000 | Ordered with the Armament Programme 2018, budget CHF 199.2 million. Supplied by Seyntex N.V. and SSZ Equipment SA. |
NBC protection
| Paul Boyé Technologies; ABC Einsatzanzüge 21 | | France | NBC protection suit level 4 | 2023 | 160,000 | Purchased with the Armament Programme 2021, budget CHF 120 million. The equipment includes the suit. a mask, gloves and overboots. 30'000 protection suits and 3,300 training suits delivered as of 2023. |
| Paul Boyé Technologies; ABC Ausbildungsanzüge | | France | NBC training suit | 2023 | 57,000 | Purchased with the Armament Programme 2021, budget CHF 120 million. The equipment includes the suit. a mask, gloves and overboots. 30'000 protection suits and 3,300 training suits delivered as of 2023. |
Clothing
| Combat Clothing 2006; Kampfbekleidung 90/06 | | Switzerland | Combat uniform | 2006 | – | Using the TAZ 90 camouflage. |
| Modulat combat clothing system 18; MBAS Programm, Kampfbekleidung 18 | | Switzerland; Belgium; Italy | Combat uniform | 2022 | 100,000 | Ordered with the Armament Programme 2018, budget CHF 377 million. This programme includes the combat clothing, the modular bags, the hydration systems, and a ballistic protection (199.2 million). Using the TAZ 16 camouflage (mostly Swiss suppliers). The MBAS clothing includes: Camouflage suit; Summer: light jacket, shirt, trousers and combinaison; Winter: jacket with hood, shirt, trousers with kneepads; Climate barrier (insulating jacket); Cold weather (jacket, trousers); Underwear layer (short + t-shirt) |
Bomb suit
| MED-ENG | | United States | Bomb suit | – | – | Standard issue. |
Shoes
| AKU Tactical ® Kampfstiefel Schwer 19 (KS 19) | – | Italy | Combat boots | 2021 | 75,000 | New standard combat shoes, ordered with the Armament Programme 2019. Replacement of the old combat shoes (KS90). |
| AKU Tactical ® Kampfstiefel Schwer 14 GTX® (KS 14) | | Italy | Combat boots | 2016 | – | Purchased for professional soldiers. |
| Meindl; Kampfstiefel Schwer 08 AGFA (KS 08) | | Germany | Combat boots | 2010 | – | Purchased for professional soldiers. |

== Indirect fire ==
=== Self-propelled indirect fire systems ===
| Model | Image | Origin | Type | Calibre | Acquired | In service since | Quantity (2026) | Notes |
Howitzers
| M-109 KAWEST WE | | United States; Switzerland | SPH | 155 mm L/47 | 581 | 2009 | 133 | The remaining M109 in service are all at the standard M-109 KAWEST WE. |
Special munitions
| SMArt 155 | | Germany | Guided anti-tank artillery round | 155 mm | 2,000 | 2004-05 | 2,000 | Purchased with the Armament Programme 2001 for CHF168 million. Used with the M109 KAWEST WE, and likely to be used with the Piranha AAC - AGM. a |
Electronic equipment for indirect fire support
| Elbit laptop INTAFF 15 | – | Israel | Artillery command equipment | – | – | – | – | Ordered to support the M109 Kawest WE. |
Simulators
| SAPH simulator M-109 KAWEST WE | | Switzerland | SPH simulator | – | – | 1999 | – | Simulators based in Bière and Frauenfeld, the artillery troops bases. |
| ZAAM MTSS - 12 cm Mörser 16 Zugausbildungsanlage Mörser - modularen Teilsystem-Simulatoren | – | Switzerland | Mortar carrier - cannon operation simulator | – | 4 | 2026 | 4 | Simulator for the RUAG Cobra, based in Bière since November 2026, the two systems focus on the operators of the mortar system, and not the vehicle crew (driver). The system is supplied by GDELS-Mowag , Brunner Elektronik AG and RUAG MRO. |
| GFM MTSS - 12 cm Mörser 16 Geschützführer Ausbildungsanlage Mörser - modularen Teilsystem-Simulatoren | – | Switzerland | Mortar carrier - gun commander training system simulator | – | 4 | 2026 | 4 | Simulator for the RUAG Cobra, based in Bière since November 2026, the two systems focus on the operators of the mortar system, and not the vehicle crew (driver). The system is supplied by GDELS-Mowag , Brunner Elektronik AG and RUAG MRO. |

=== Mortar systems ===
| Model | Image | Origin | Type | Calibre | Acquired | In service since | Quantity (2024) | Notes |
120mm mortar systems
| Bofors STRIX; 12 cm Minenwerfer intelligentes Geschoss 96 STRIX (12 cm Mw int G 96 STRIX) | – | Sweden | Guided anti-tank mortar round | 120 mm | – | 1998 | – | Purchased with the Armament Programme 1996 for CHF91 million. The equipment includes the charges, the extended range charges, and the munition programming system. Initially the munitions were used with the fortress 120mm mortar system, and with the Minenwerfer 74 (towed W+F Bern 120mm mortar system). The munitions are to be adapted to the 12 cm Mörser 16 - Mowag Piranha IV (RUAG Cobra). |
81mm mortar systems
| Expal MX2 km 81 mm 8.1cm Mörser 19 | | Spain | Mortar | 81 mm | 300 | 2021 | 300 (by end 2023) | Purchased with the Armament Programme 19 for CHF 118 million, replacing the Minenwerfer 8,1 cm 72: CHF 57.5 million for the mortars, observation laptops, ballistic computer, radio and modifications to the simulator; CHF 49.0 million for ammunition (Saab Bofors Dynamic Switzerland); CHF 11.5 for logistics, risk, and reserve on inflation. |
| Saab Bofors Dynamics Switzerland - MAPAM 81mm Wurfgranaten 94 | – | Switzerland | Combat explosive mortar round | 81 mm | – | – | – | Supplied by Saab Bofors Dynamics Switzerland Ltd. |
| Saab Bofors Dynamics Switzerland - 81mm Explosiv-Übungsgranaten 91 | – | Switzerland | Training mortar round | 81 mm | – | – | – | Supplied by Saab Bofors Dynamics Switzerland Ltd. |
| Rheinmetall EXPAL Cargo - illumination | – | Germany; Spain | Illumination mortar round - white light | 81 mm | – | 2025 | – | Ordered with Armament Programme 2019. Ammunition supplied by Rheinmetall EXPAL Munitions SA, made in Neuenburg am Rhein. |
| Rheinmetall EXPAL Cargo - IR illumination | – | Germany; Spain | Illumination mortar round - infrared based on red phosphorus | 81 mm | – | 2025 | – | Ordered with Armament Programme 2019. Ammunition supplied by Rheinmetall EXPAL Munitions SA, made in Neuenburg am Rhein. |
| Rheinmetall EXPAL Cargo - smoke | – | Germany; Spain | Illumination mortar round - smoke discharge based on red phosphorus | 81 mm | – | 2025 | – | Ordered with Armament Programme 2019. Ammunition supplied by Rheinmetall EXPAL Munitions SA, made in Neuenburg am Rhein. |
| Panasonic CF-20 Toughpad; TARANIS SMS Scouts | | Germany; Japan | Observation and fire control computer (laptop) | – | 520 | – | 520 | Ordered to equip the 8.1 cm Mörser 19. Equipped with the TARANIS system for mortar fire control system (derivative of system ESG FÜWES ADLER III). |
| Panasonic FZ-M1 Toughpad; TARANIS SMS ballistic | | Germany; Japan | Ballistic computer (tablet) | – | 320 | – | 320 | Ordered to support the 8.1 cm Mörser 19. |
| Radio; SE-189 / + small radios | – | – | Radio with data transmission | – | 120 / 1,120 | – | 120 / 1,120 | Ordered to support the 8.1 cm Mörser 19. Civilian radio used as a transition solution until the service of the TASYS system. |
| Hirtenberger Defense ELectronic Aiming Device; ELAD | | Austria | Mortar electronic aiming device | – | 300 | – | 300 | Delivered between 2021 and 2023 for the Expal MX2 km 81 mm. |
60mm mortar systems
| 6 cm Mortar 87; 6 cm Werfer 87 | | Switzerland | Infantry mortars | 60 mm | 5,500 | 1990 | – | 5'500 of those mortars were initially ordered, their number today is unknown, range 250 – 1,000 meters. |

== Armoured vehicles ==
=== Armoured fighting vehicles ===
| Model | Image | Origin | Type | Acquired | In service since | Quantity (2024) | Notes |
Tanks
| Leopard 2A4; Panzer 87 WE (Pz 87 WE) | | West Germany; Switzerland | MBT | 380 | 1987 | 134 | 134 Panzer 87 modernised to standard Panzer 87 WE through the Armament Programme 2006, converted in 2009–2011, in active service since 2011. 45 Leopard 2 were produced in Germany, 335 were made in Switzerland. Among the 380 purchased, 134 are in service, 71 remain in the reserve, some were modified for an engineering use, and the rest was re-exported. |
Infantry fighting vehicles
| CV9030 CH (CV90 Mk II); Schützenpanzer 2000 (Spz 2000) | | Sweden; Switzerland | IFV | 154 | 2003 | 186 | Purchased with the Armament Programme 2000, budget CHF 990 million. Modernisation of the CV90 through the Armement Programme 2020, budget CHF 438 million. Option for 124 additional CV9030 was never confirmed. |
| CV9030 CH (CV90 Mk II); Kommando Schützenpanzer 2000 (Kdo Spz 2000) | | Sweden; Switzerland | Command post IFV | 32 | 2003 | 186 | Purchased with the Armament Programme 2000, budget CHF 990 million. Modernisation of the CV90 through the Armement Programme 2020, budget CHF 438 million. Option for 124 additional CV9030 was never confirmed. |
Tank hunters
| Mowag Piranha IB 6×6; Panzerjäger 90 (Pzj TOW 6×6) | | Switzerland; Norway | Tank hunter | 310 | 1990 | 106 | Vehicles equipped with a NM142 turret (Norwegian design), armed with 2 BGM-71 TOW 2. Being progressively retired since 2023. 200 modified in other variants, 2 destroyed in accident, 2 sold to police Geneva. |
Simulators
| CV9030 CH; Ausbildungsmittel Spz. 2000 | – | Sweden; Switzerland | Instruction equipment | 7 turrets 3 chassis | – | 7 turrets 3 chassis | Purchased with the Complementary Armament Programme 2002, budget CHF 37 million, used only to train the troop and the mechanics. |

=== Armoured vehicles (APC, command and reconnaissance vehicles) ===
| Model | Image | Origin | Type | Acquired | In service since | Quantity (2024) | Notes |
Tracked vehicles
| M113 A1; Schützpanzer 63/07 Rpe (SPz 63/07 Rpe) | – | United States; Switzerland | APC | 1,250 | 2008 (after upgrade) | 40 | Equipped with the SE-235 / m2+ / m1 radio system. Planned to be retired in 2031. |
| M113 A1; Kommando Panzer 63/07 (Kdo Pz 63/07) | | United States; Switzerland | Command vehicle | 1,250 | 2008 (after upgrade) | 50 | Equipped with the SE-235 / m2+ / m1. Planned be replaced by Mowag Eagle V 6×6, but the orders have not yet been placed (2024 and 2026). |
| M113 A1; Kommando Panzer Artillerie 63/97 (Kdo Pz Art 63/97) | | United States; Switzerland | Artillery command post | 1,250 | 1998 (after upgrade) | 35 | Equipped with the SE-235 / m2+ / m1 radio system and the GPS / INTAFF system. |
| M113 A1; Feuerleitpanzer 63/97 (Flt Pz 63/97) | | United States; Switzerland | Fire direction vehicle | 1,250 | 1998 (after upgrade) | 53 | Equipped with the SE-235 / m2+ / m1 / INTAFF radio / communication / command systems. |
Wheeled vehicles
| Mowag Piranha IB 6×6; Kommando Panzer 6×6 gl (Kdo Pz 6×6) | | Switzerland | Command vehicle | 0 | 2008 | 160 | Converted from Panzerjäger 90 with the Armament Programme 2006, budget CHF126 million. |
| Mowag Piranha IB 6×6; Sanitätspanzer | | Switzerland | Armoured ambulance | 0 | 2006 | 40 | Converted from Panzerjäger 90 with the Armament Programme 2005, budget CHF 38 million. |
| Mowag Piranha IB 6×6 Panzerjäger Fahrschule | – | Switzerland | Driver training vehicle | 4 | – | 4 | Driver training vehicle. |
| Mowag Piranha IIC 8×8; Radschützenpanzer 93 (Spz 93) | | Switzerland | APC | 515 | 1995 | 282 | 515 Piranha II 8×8 (CHF 721 million) in 4 variants. Armament Programmes: 1993, 205 vehicles, CHF 305 million; 1996, 205 vehicles, CHF 284 million; 1999, 105 vehicles, CHF 132 million Equipment: PAL Pz 93 with RGW 90; Kdo Pz 93/99 INTAFF with command system. |
| Mowag Piranha IIC 8×8; PAL Pz 93 | | Switzerland | APC | 515 | 1995 | 141 | 515 Piranha II 8×8 (CHF 721 million) in 4 variants. Armament Programmes: 1993, 205 vehicles, CHF 305 million; 1996, 205 vehicles, CHF 284 million; 1999, 105 vehicles, CHF 132 million Equipment: PAL Pz 93 with RGW 90; Kdo Pz 93/99 INTAFF with command system. |
| Mowag Piranha IIC 8×8; Kommando Panzer 93/99 (Kdo Pz 93/99) | | Switzerland | Command vehicle | 515 | 1995 | 92 | 515 Piranha II 8×8 (CHF 721 million) in 4 variants. Armament Programmes: 1993, 205 vehicles, CHF 305 million; 1996, 205 vehicles, CHF 284 million; 1999, 105 vehicles, CHF 132 million Equipment: PAL Pz 93 with RGW 90; Kdo Pz 93/99 INTAFF with command system. |
| Mowag Piranha IIC 8×8; Kommando Panzer 93/99 INTAFF (Kdo Pz 93/99 INTAFF) | | Switzerland | Artillery command post | 515 | 1995 | 92 | 515 Piranha II 8×8 (CHF 721 million) in 4 variants. Armament Programmes: 1993, 205 vehicles, CHF 305 million; 1996, 205 vehicles, CHF 284 million; 1999, 105 vehicles, CHF 132 million Equipment: PAL Pz 93 with RGW 90; Kdo Pz 93/99 INTAFF with command system. |
| Mowag Piranha IIC 8×8; Schützpanzer 93 Militärpolizei (Spz Pz 93 Militärpolizei) | | Switzerland | APC | 8 | 1998 | 8 | Military police vehicle. |
| Mowag Piranha IIC 8×8; Schützpanzer 93 Fahrschule (Spz 93 Fahrschule) | | Switzerland | Driver training vehicle | 5 | 1995 | 5 | Driver training vehicle. |
| Mowag Piranha IIIC 8×8; Führung Panzer (FHR Pz) | | Switzerland | Command vehicle | 6 | 2005 | 6 | Ordered with the Armament Programme 2002. Armed with M2 Browning (Mg 63/93). |
| Mowag Piranha IIIC 8×8; Führung Panzer FIS/HE INTAFF (FHR Pz FIS/HE INTAFF) (FIS=Command Information System) | | Switzerland | Artillery command post | 6 | 2011 | 6 | Ordered with the Armament Programme 2007. Artillery Command, also known as Fire Management Center. |
| Mowag Duro IIIP 6×6; Duro Geschütztes Mannschaft Transportfahrzeug (Duro GMTF) | | Switzerland | APC | 420 | 2010 | 407 | 420 Mowag Duro IIIP 6×6 in 3 variants, CHF 740 million, purchased in 3 batches. Armament programmes: 2008, 220 vehicle (210 GMTF, 6 ambulance, 4 GMTF SWISSINT), 396 million; 2010, 70 vehicles, 122 million; 2013, 130 vehicles, 222 million 72 GMTF equipped with FIS HE command information system. 3 GMTF lost over accidents. |
| Mowag Duro IIIP 6×6; Duro GMTF SWISSINT KFOR | – | Switzerland | APC | 420 | 2010 | 6 | 420 Mowag Duro IIIP 6×6 in 3 variants, CHF 740 million, purchased in 3 batches. Armament programmes: 2008, 220 vehicle (210 GMTF, 6 ambulance, 4 GMTF SWISSINT), 396 million; 2010, 70 vehicles, 122 million; 2013, 130 vehicles, 222 million 72 GMTF equipped with FIS HE command information system. 3 GMTF lost over accidents. |
| Mowag Duro IIIP 6×6; Duro GMTF SWISSINT KFOR Ambulance | | Switzerland | Armoured ambulance | 420 | 2010 | 4 | 420 Mowag Duro IIIP 6×6 in 3 variants, CHF 740 million, purchased in 3 batches. Armament programmes: 2008, 220 vehicle (210 GMTF, 6 ambulance, 4 GMTF SWISSINT), 396 million; 2010, 70 vehicles, 122 million; 2013, 130 vehicles, 222 million 72 GMTF equipped with FIS HE command information system. 3 GMTF lost over accidents. |
| Mowag Eagle V 6×6; Aufklärungssystem TASYS | | Switzerland | Armoured reconnaissance vehicles | 100 | 2025 | > 5 | Ordered with the Armament Programme 2019, budget CHF 380 million. 100 vehicles ordered, 11 for instruction, 89 for service use.with scout troops. C2 system supplied by Elbit Systems, L3 Harris WESCAM MX™ - RSTA on mast 8 m high: 1 HD color camera; 1 SWIR camera; 1 MWIR camera; 1 illumination laser; 1 distance measure laser; INTAFF 15 for data transmission. |
| Mowag Eagle II; Aufklärungsfahrzeug 97/06 | | Switzerland | Armoured reconnaissance vehicle | 175 | 1997 | 171 | Ordered with the Armament Programme 1997, budget CHF 99 million. Modernised in 2006, 4 decommissioned after accident. |
| Mowag Eagle III; Schiesskommandanten Fahrzeug INTAFF (SKdt Fz INTAFF) | | Switzerland | Artillery observer vehicle, and artillery command post | 120 | 2003 | 119 | Ordered with the Armament Programme 2000, budget CHF 166 million. |
| ACS Enok 5.4 Swissint; Panzer Wagen, Mercedes-Benz G300 CDI 4×4 | | Germany; Austria | Armoured patrol vehicle | Unknown | – | – | Purchased for peace keeping missions for Swissint. Known to be used with the Swisscoy mission. |

=== Armoured engineering vehicles ===
| Model | Image | Origin | Type | Acquired | In service since | Quantity (2024) | Notes |
Recovery equipment
| BPz3 Büffel; Bergpanzer Büffel (BPz Büffel) | | Germany; Switzerland | ARV | 0 | 2004 | 25 | Converted from the Swiss-produced Panzer 87 with the Armament Programme 2001, budget CHF 179 million. |
Bridging equipment
| Leguan; Brückenpanzer Leo | | Germany; Switzerland | AVLB | 0 | 2020 | 12 | Converted from the Swiss-produced Panzer 87 with the Armament Programme 2014, budget CHF 179 million (last being delivered in 2023). The order included the following equipment for the military: 12 pairs of 14 m bridges (24 bridges); 6 IVECO semi trucks 6×6 supplying reserve 14 m bridges; 12 bridges of 26 m; 6 IVECO semi trucks 8×8 supplying reserve 26 m bridges; The order included also civilian requirements: 1 pair of 14 m bridges; 1 bridge of 26 m |
Sapper and engineering equipment
| AEV 3 Kodiak; Geniepanzer Kodiak | | Germany; Switzerland | AEV | 0 | 2008 | 12 | Converted from the Swiss-produced Panzer 87 with the Armament Programme 2006, budget CHF 139 million. The system includes several modules / configurations: 12 engineering; 6 demining; 4 added mine protection |
| M113 A1; Minenräumpanzer 63/00 (Mirm Pz 63/00) | | United States; Switzerland | Mine plough | – | 2003 | 12 | Ordered with Armament Programme 2000. Being replaced by the Mowag Piranha IV PI PZ 21 (Pionier Panzerfahrzeug 21). |
| M113 A1; Sappeur Panzer 63/05 (Sap Pz 63/05) | | United States; Switzerland | Sapper vehicle | – | 2005 | 60 | Equipment: SE-235 / m1. Being replaced by the Mowag Piranha IV PI PZ 21 (Pionier Panzerfahrzeug 21). |
Explosive ordinance disposal
| Mowag Duro IIIP; EOD/KAMIBES | – | Switzerland | EOD vehicle | 5 | 2008 | 5 | 5 DURO–3P EOD (5 delivered in 2008). |
| Mowag Eagle IV; EOD | | Switzerland | EOD vehicle | 5 | 2015 | 5 | Equipped with PackBot. |
| Telerob tEODor | | Germany | EOD robot | 5 | – | 5 | Equipping the Mowag Duro IIIP EOD. |
| Endeavor Robotics PackBot | | United States | EOD robot | 5 | – | 5 | Equipping the Mowag Eagle V EOD. |
| Ahlmann AS 200 PRG; Pistenraümwagen 98 | | Germany | EOD machine | 22 | – | 22 | Used for mechanically clearing unexploded ordnance, mines, and bomblets from airfield runways. Can be converted into a specialized construction vehicle for runway repairs. |
| Ahlmann AS 200 PRG; Pistenraümwagen 98/06 (armoured) | | Germany | Armoured EOD machine | 6 | – | 6 | Used for mechanically clearing unexploded ordnance, mines, and bomblets from airfield runways. Can be converted into a specialized construction vehicle for runway repairs. |
Armoured machines
| CAT 938G | | United States | Armoured wheel-loader | 1 | – | 1 | Used by the KFOR / Swisscoy for engineering missions that require protection. |

=== Chemical, biological, radiological, and nuclear reconnaissance vehicles ===
| Model | Image | Origin | Type | Acquired | In service since | Quantity (2024) | Notes |
|---|---|---|---|---|---|---|---|
| Piranha IIIC 8×8; ABC-Aufklärungsfahrzeug 08 (ABC Aufkl Fz 08) | | Switzerland | CBRN reconnaissance vehicle | 12 | 2015 | 12 | Ordered with the Armament Programme 2008 + Armament Programme 2011 for a budget of CHF 70 million + CHF 25 million (for new technology). Protected by 3 additional ballistic armour modules STANAG level 4. |
| Duro IIIP; Duro ABC Nachweis Fahrzeug (Nachweis Fz ABC Abw) | | Switzerland | CBRN reconnaissance vehicle | 12 | 2015 | 12 | Ordered with the Armament Programme 2008, budget CHF 47 million. The order will equip 4 teams, each equipped with: 1 A for radiation detection; 1 B for bacteriologic detection; 1 C for chemical detection |
| ACS Enok 5.4; Radiometrie Wagen L22, Mercedes-Benz G280 CDI 4×4 | | Germany; Austria | Radiology reconnaissance vehicle | 4 | – | 4 | Equips the ABC Defense Battalion 10. |

=== Armoured communications vehicles ===
| Model | Image | Origin | Type | Acquired | In service since | Quantity (2024) | Notes |
|---|---|---|---|---|---|---|---|
| Piranha IIIC 8×8; Radio Access Point Pz (RAP Pz) | | Switzerland | Mobile radio transmission with wire communication system | 36 | 2005 | 36 | Ordered with the Armament programme 2002, with a budget of CHF120 million. 13 m high mast, with 2 R-905 directional antennas, used as the bridge between the wire based communication system IMFS and the radio system SE-235. |
| Piranha IIIC 8×8; Mehrzweck-Sender IFASS (Mzs Pz SE-630) | | Switzerland | Multi-purpose transmitter | 8 | 2012 | 8 | Ordered with the Armament Programme 2007. IFASS multi-use emitter. |
| Piranha IIIC 8×8; KOMPAK Pz | | Switzerland | Communication hub vehicle | 12 | 2014 | 12 | Ordered with the Armament Programme 2007. Equipment: SE-239 radio; SE-441 POLYCOM radio; SATCOM; CrossSwitch (assembly of communication systems); Antennas on mast |
| Piranha IIIC 8×8; Kommunikation Panzer (KOMM Pz) | | Switzerland | Communication hub vehicle | 8 | 2010 | 8 | Ordered with the Armament Programme 2009. |

=== Turrets, weapon stations and weapons of armoured vehicles ===
| Model | Image | Origin | Type | Weapons | Vehicle | Acquired | In service since | Quantity (2024) | Notes |
Turrets
| Leopard 2A4 turret | | Germany; Switzerland | Manned tank turret | Rh-120 L/44; 2 × MG 51/87 (7.5 mm GP11, 1 as coaxial MG and 1 on pintle mount); 16 × SW Thun smoke discharger (76 mm) | Panzer 87WE | 380 | 1987 | 134 | 134 tanks to standard Panzer 87 WE with the Armament Programme 2006. |
| BAE Bofors E30 | | Sweden; Switzerland | Manned turret | Mk 44 Bushmaster II (30 mm); MG 51/00 (7.5 mm GP11); 8 × SW Thun smoke discharger (76 mm) | CV9030 | 193 | 2003 | 193 | 193 purchased with the Armament Programme 2000. 7 training turrets with the Complementary Armament Programme 2002. |
| Kværner NM142 | | Norway | Remote turret | BGM-71 TOW 2; 8 × SW Thun smoke discharger (76 mm) | Panzerjäger 90 | 310 | 1990 | 106 | Being retired since 2023. |
Weapon stations
| Mowag MBK 2 | | Switzerland | Observation cupola | MG 51/71 (7.5 mm GP11); 6 × SW Thun smoke discharger (76 mm) | Mowag Eagle II; Aufklärungfahrzeug 93/97 | 331 | 1999 | 171 | Also equipped with an observation system WBG 90. 171 Eagle II remain in service. |
| KUKA 606 A1-CH | | Germany | RCWS | Maschinengewehr 63/93 (12.7 mm); 8 × SW Thun smoke discharger (76 mm) | Mowag Piranha IIC 8×8 (Spz 93, PAL Pz 93, Kdo Pz 93/99, Kdo Pz 93/99 INTAFF, Pz 93 Militärpolizei) | 523 | 1995 / 1998 | 523 | |
| Kongsberg M151 Protector | | Norway | | Maschinengewehr 07 (12.7 mm); 8 × SW Thun smoke discharger (76 mm) | Mowag Piranha IB 6×6; Kommando Panzer 6×6 gl | 160 | 2008 | 160 | Modified Piranha variant to a command role. |
| Kongsberg M151 Protector | | Norway | | Maschinengewehr 07 (12.7 mm); 8 × SW Thun smoke discharger (76 mm) | Mowag Duro IIIP NBRC; ABC Nachweis Fahrzeug | 12 | 2015 | 12 | Acquired with the Armament Programme 2008. |
| Kongsberg M151 Protector | | Norway | | Maschinengewehr 07 (12.7 mm); 8 × SW Thun smoke discharger (76 mm) | Piranha IIIC 8×8 NBRC; ABC-Aufklärungsfahrzeug 08 | 12 | 2015 | 12 | Acquired with the Armament Programme 2008. |
| Kongsberg M153 Protector | | Norway; Switzerland | RCWS | Maschinengewehr 07 (12.7 mm); 8 × SW Thun smoke discharger (76 mm) | Mowag Duro IIIP; Duro GMTF | 420 | 2010 | 420 | Orders with Armement Programmes: 2008: 218 (for vehicles) + 2 (for instruction); 2010: 70; 2013: 130; The 2010 and 2013 orders were manufactured in Switzerland. |
| Kongsberg M153 Protector | | Norway; Switzerland | RCWS | Maschinengewehr 07 (12.7 mm); 4 × SW Thun smoke discharger (76 mm) | Mowag Eagle V EOD; Aufklfz EOR | 5 | 2012 | 5 | |
| Kongsberg Protector RS4 | | Norway | RCWS | Maschinengewehr 07 (12.7 mm); 8 × Rheinmetall Maske rapid smoke (76 mm) | Mowag Piranha IV - Sapper; Pionier Panzerfahrzeug 21 | 84 | 2025 | 84 | 60 ordered in 2021, 24 more in 2022. |
| Kongsberg Protector RS4 | | Norway | RCWS | Maschinengewehr 07 (12.7 mm); 8 × Rheinmetall Maske rapid smoke (76 mm) | Mowag Eagle V6×6; Aufklärungssystem TASYS | 100 | 2025 | 100 | Ordered in December 2019, as part of the Armament Programme 2019. |
| Kongsberg Protector RS4 | | Norway | RCWS | Maschinengewehr 07 (12.7 mm); 8 × Rheinmetall Maske rapid smoke (76 mm) | Mowag Piranha IV - Mortar carrier 12 cm Mörser 16 | 48 | 2026 | 48 | 32 ordered in 2016, 16 ordered in 2022. |
| Defenture ringmount | | Netherlands | Ring mount | Maschinengewehr 07 (12.7 mm), and / or MG 51/71 (7.5 mm GP11) | Defenture GRF; LAUF 20 GRF | – | – | – | |
Tank munitions
| Rheinmetall DM11; 12cm Pz Kan MZ Pat 21 | | Germany | 120 mm, HE-FRAG programmable munition | Rh-120 L/44 | Panzer 87WE | – | 2025 | – | New munition with the Armament Programme 2025 and the modernisation of the Panzer 87. |
| DM12A1 MZ; HL Pat 87 Lsp | | Germany | 120 mm, HEAT MP-T | Rh-120 L/44 | Panzer 87WE | – | – | – | Purchased to be used with the first Leopard 2A4 in service. |
| DM33; Pfeil Pat 90 Lsp | – | Germany; Switzerland | 120 mm, APFSDS-T | Rh-120 L/44 | Panzer 87WE | – | – | – | Purchased to be used with the first Leopard 2A4 in service. Produced under licence in Switzerland. |
| DM53; Pfeil Pat 98 Lsp | | Germany; Switzerland | 120 mm, APFSDS-T | Rh-120 L/44 | Panzer 87WE | 20,000 | 2001 | 20,000 | Made by Rheinmetall DeTec and RUAG Ammotec, with a tungsten projectile (WSM 4-1 tungsten alloy). |
IFV munitions
| Rheinmetall-Oerlikom PMC 287; 30mm Spz Kan 00 Pfeil Pat Lsp | | Switzerland | 30×173 mm, APFSDS-T | Mk44S Bushmaster II | CV9030 | – | 2003 | – | Tested in 2000. |
| Rheinmetall-Oerlikom PMC 308; 30mm Spz Kan 00 Mzwk Pat Lsp | | Switzerland | 30×173 mm, ABM / KETF | Mk44S Bushmaster II | CV9030 | – | 2003 | – | Tested in 2000. |
Smoke grenades
| SW Thun Nebelwerfer (76 mm); 7,6 cm Nebelwerfer 1987 | | Germany; Switzerland | Smoke grenade, 76mm | – | Armed and armoured vehicles | – | 1987 | – | Remains in service. Made under licence, designed by Diehl. |
| Rheinmetall Maske 76mm rapid smoke 7,6cm Nebelpatrone 21 mit elektrischer Zündung | – | Germany | Smoke grenade, 76mm | – | Armed and armoured vehicles | – | 2022 | – | Ordered in 2022. |

== Unarmoured vehicles ==
=== Tracked vehicles ===
| Model | Image | Origin | Type | Acquired | In service since | Quantity (2024) | Notes |
|---|---|---|---|---|---|---|---|
| M548; RPE Transport Wagen 68/05 (Rpe Trspw 68/05) | | United States; Switzerland | Ammunition tracked transport vehicle | 119 | 1963 | 58 | To be retired by 2031. |

=== Wheeled vehicles ===
| Model | Image | Origin | Type | Acquired | In service since | Quantity (2024) | Notes |
Special forces vehicles
| AGF Serval; Leicht Aufklärung Fahrzeug 06 (LAuF 06) | | Germany; Austria | Light reconnaissance vehicle | Unknown | 2007 | – | Light reconnaissance and support vehicle used by AAD10, supplied in 2007. Equipped with RLS 609CH mount for M2 Browning and MG 51 /71. Vehicle being replaced by the LAUF 20. |
Utility vehicles
| Mowag Duro I Bucher Duro I WE | | Switzerland | Transport and utility 4×4 vehicle | 3,000 | 2018 | 2,200 | Duro modernised under the Complementary Armament Programme 2015, budget CHF 558 million: 2040 vehicles equipped with transport structure; 160 vehicles withoutInitially, the Mowag Duro was ordered: Armament Programme 1993, 2000 ordered; Armament Programme 1997, 1000 ordered |
| Mowag Duro I | | Switzerland | Utility vehicles used for command, communications, workshop | 3,000 | 2000 | Around 800 | Vehicles equipped with a shelter tailored to the mission. |
| G-class G300CDI (W461); Leichter Geländwagen | | Germany; Austria | Transmission, communication and logistics light vehicles | 3,400 | 2016 | 3,400 | Armament programme 2014, 3,200 vehicles, budget CHF 440 million. Armament programme 2015, 200 communication vehicles SE-235/M2. |
| G-class G300CDI (W461); L Motf gl Fach Syst Kleinshelter Hess | | Germany; Austria | Transmission, communication and logistics light vehicles | 679 | 2018 | 679 | Armament programme 2015, budget CHF 271 million. 180 of the vehicles are transmission ones, equipped with radio SE-235 / SE-240. |
| Mercedes-Benz Sprinter 316 BT 4×4; Sprinter - minibus 10 places | (illustration vehicle type) | Germany | Troop transport during peace time | 260 | 2015 | 260 | Armament programme 2013. |
| Mercedes-Benz 316 CDI 4×4; Sprinter - minibus 10 places | (illustration vehicle type) | Germany | Troop transport during peace time | 280 | 2012 | 280 | Armament programmes: 2010, 170 vehicles ordered; 2011, 50 vehicles ordered; 2013, 30 vehicles ordered via AEB 2013 |
| Mercedes-Benz Sprinter 316 CDI 4×4; Sprinter - panel van | (illustration vehicle type) | Germany | Utility vehicle | 100 | 2014 | 100 | Armament programme 2014. |
| VW T5 4×4; Reparatur Wagen TAFLIR 4×4 VW T5 (RepW TAFLIR VW T5) | (illustration vehicle type) | Germany | Repair utility vehicle | – | – | – | TAFLIR radar mobile workshop. |
| VW T6 2.0 TDI 4×4; Hundeführer KA 2Box | | Germany | Canine vehicle | – | 2020 | – | |
Medical vehicles
| Mercedes-Benz Sprinter 516 CDI; Sanitätswagen Leicht (Sanw L) | | Germany | Military equipped ambulance | 150 | 2013 | 20 | Ordered with the Armament programme 2009, with a budget of CHF47 million. Used as a complement to the Piranha I 6×6 ambulances. 20 with same medical equipment as the Piranha, and 130 with civilian medical equipment. |
| Mercedes-Benz Sprinter 516 CDI; Sanitätswagen Leicht (Sanw L) | | Germany | Civilian equipped ambulance | 150 | 2013 | 130 | Ordered with the Armament programme 2009, with a budget of CHF47 million. Used as a complement to the Piranha I 6×6 ambulances. 20 with same medical equipment as the Piranha, and 130 with civilian medical equipment. |
Military police vehicles
| BMW 530d (F11) (Patr Fz BMW 530d) | | Germany | Military police vehicle | – | – | – | |
| BMW X3 (F25) (Patr Fz BMW X3) | | Germany | Military police vehicle | – | – | – | |
| BMW X5 (E70) (Patr Fz BMW X5) | – | Germany | Military police vehicle | – | – | – | |
| Volkswagen Transporter T5 (Eiw MP Multifunktional 5Pl 4×4 VW T5) | | Germany | Military police vehicle | – | – | – | |
| Volkswagen Transporter T5 (Eiw MP Spez Det KA 4×4 VW T5) | – | Germany | Military police vehicle | – | – | – | Special detachment military police vehicle. |
| Volkswagen Transporter T6 | | Germany | Military police vehicle | – | – | – | |
| Mitsubishi Pajero (4th gen) | | Japan | Military police vehicle | – | – | – | In use with SWISSINT, operated in Kosovo as part of the Swisscoy mission, as a KFOR military police. |
Light trailers
| 1-axle trailer - 1.7 ton capacity Anhänger 16 (Anh 16) | | Switzerland | Light trailer | 3,500 | 2022 | 3,500 | Armament programme: 2013, 500 ordered; 2016, 2,000 ordered; 2021, 1,000 ordered; Replaces the "Anhänger 87", made by Zbinden. |
None-military vehicles
| Toyota Hilux (8th gen, 2020 facelift) - double cab, 2.8 D-4D; Pick-up 5 Pl 4×4 | – | Japan | Municipal vehicle | 155 | 2022 | 155 | Summer and winter maintenance of military bases. |

=== Motorcycles ===
| Model | Image | Origin | Type | Acquired | In service since | Quantity (2024) | Notes |
Sidearms
| BMW F700 GS | | Germany | Dual-sport motorcycle | 600 | 2017 | 600 | |

=== Engineering equipment, vehicles and machines ===
| Model | Image | Origin | Type | Acquired | In service since | Quantity (2024) | Notes |
Bridging equipment
| Pont flottant motorisé Schwimmbrücke 95/15 | | France; Switzerland | Pontoon bridge | 9 | 1996 | 9 | Acquired with the Armament Programme 1995 for a budget of CHF 211 million, succeeding to the Schwimmbrücke 61. The purchase included 9 sets with each: 9 modules; 4 ramps; 13 trucks; Modernisation of the system in 2021 by RUAG MRO: 55 of the 100 modules modernised; 24 access ramps modernised; replacement of the transport capacity (118 Steyr 1491.320 replaced with 94 Iveco Trakker AT380T50WT/P 6×6 and 81 semi-trailers from DOLL) |
| WFEL Dry Support Bridge; Unterstützungsbrücke 45m (Ustü Brü Syst 45 m) | | United Kingdom | Support bridge | 16 | 2014 | 16 | Acquired with the Armament Programme 2011 and 2013, for a budget of CHF 173 and 86 million. Total equipment: 16 bridges; 24 module assembly and crane based on a Iveco Trakker 10×8/6; 112 containers with 2 bridges elements each; 64 transport trucks (Iveco Trakker 8×8) + 48 trailers; 16 trucks to transport 770 meters of parallel pedestrian bridges |
| Mabey Delta Bridge; Ustü Brü Syst | | United Kingdom | Maybey type bridge | 1 | 2015 | 1 | Used to cross the Rhine at the "Waffenplatz Chur" to access the shooting range. It is a "long single-span Delta Bridge" of 90 meters. |
| Mabey Bridge Compact 200 - Logistic support bridge Ustü Brü Syst | | United Kingdom | Maybey type bridge | – | – | – | Emergency bridge purchased in 2007. |
| Steel bridge Stahlträgerbrücke 90 (St Trg Brü 90); 142 meters | | – | Steel temporary bridge | 12 | 1998 | 12 | Ordered with the Armament Programme 1997. Equipment required for its installation: Pile diver "Rammgerät 94" (DEMAG system on a R 912 LC Liebherr machine) Barge; Mobile crane LTM1040/1 "Mob KranW 6×6"; 12 meters modules, up to 142 m length. |
Bridging support equipment
| Class 30 trackway Rollstrasse 08 | | United Kingdom | Aluminium matting system | – | – | – | Unknown quantity in service. |
| Liebherr R 912 LC equipped with DEMAG HB14; Rammgerät 94 | | Germany; Switzerland | Pile driver crawler | 25 | 1995 | 25 | Procured with Armament Programme 1994. Used to drive wood logs for temporary bridge Stahlträgerbrücke 95. |
| Rammgeräte 97 | | Switzerland | Pile driver platform | 18 | 1998 | 18 | Procured with Armament Programme 1997. Used to drive wood logs for temporary bridge Stahlträgerbrücke 95. |
Cranes
| Liebherr LTM 1040–1; 40 t Kranwagen 6×6 | (illustration of the variant) | Germany; Switzerland | Mobile crane | 5 | 1995 / 98 | 5 | |
| Liebherr LTM 1055–3.2; 55 t Kranwagen Swissint 6×6 | | Germany; Switzerland | Mobile crane | 8 | 2014 / 20 | 8 | Four cranes purchased in 2014 and four in 2020. |
| Liebherr LTM 1090–4.1; 90 t Kranwaagen 8×8 | (illustration of the variant) | Germany; Switzerland | Mobile crane | 1 | 2006 | 1 | |
Wheeled excavators
| Caterpillar M318F; Pneubagger GG 20 t | – | United States | 20-tons wheeled excavator | 8 | 2018 | 8 | |
| Caterpillar M322D | – | United States | 20-tons wheeled excavator | 1 | 2010 | 1 | |
| New Holland MH 5.6 | – | United States | 20-tons wheeled excavator | 1 | 2006 | 1 | |
| Komatsu PW 160-7 EO | – | Japan | 18-tons wheeled excavator | 4 | 2011 | 4 | |
| Hyundai R55W-9A; PHB GG 6.5 tons 4×4 gl | – | Belgium; South Korea | 6.5-tons wheeled excavator | 2 | 2020 | 2 | |
Tracked excavators
| Caterpillar 320E L | | United States | 23-tons tracked excavator | 25 | 2014 | 25 | |
| Caterpillar 320E LRR | – | United States | 26-tons tracked excavator | 7 | 2015 | 7 | |
| Caterpillar 320 | – | United States | 23.6-tons tracked excavator | 1 | 2021 | 1 | |
| Caterpillar 325 | – | United States | 29.1-tons tracked excavator | 1 | 2021 | 1 | |
| Hyundai R60CR-9A | | South Korea | 6-tons tracked excavator | 20 | 2020 | 20 | 2 in white for SWISSINT, and 18 in military camouflage for the Army. |
| Volvo EC 35C | – | Sweden | 3.8-tons tracked excavator | 2 | 2014 | 2 | |
| Volvo EC 55C | – | Sweden | 5.7-tons tracked excavator | 3 | 2009 | 3 | |
| Vovlvo ECR 58D | – | Sweden | 6-tons tracked excavator | 2 | 2014 | 2 | |
| Volvo EC 210B | – | Sweden | 18.3-tons tracked excavator | 4 | – | 4 | |
| Volvo EC 210B NC | – | Sweden | 18.3-tons tracked excavator | 7 | – | 7 | |
| Volvo EC 210B NLC | | Sweden | 18.3-tons tracked excavator | 12 | – | 12 | |
Loaders
| Caterpillar 930K; Ladeschaufel GG 14.6 t | | United States | Wheeled loader | 40 | 2013 | 40 | Ordered with the Armament programme 2010, with a budget of CHF 15 million. Successor of the FAUN F-1310. |
| Caterpillar 930M | – | United States | Wheeled loader | 10 | 2015 | 10 | |
| Liebherr LR 622B | | Germany; Switzerland | 17-tons tracked loader | 5 | 2006 | 5 | |
| Liebherr LR 624 | – | Germany; Switzerland | 19.2-tons tracked loader | 4 | 2008 | 4 | |
| Liebherr LR 634 | – | Germany; Switzerland | 22-tons tracked loader | 6 | 2009 | 6 | |
Dumpers
| Menzi Muck 45RD-C | – | Switzerland | 4.15-tons dumper | 13 | 2025 | 13 | |
Tractors
| JCB Fastrac 4220; 4×4 JCB Fastrac mit Seilwinde 20 t Pfahlrz | | United Kingdom | Fast tractor | 4 | 2018 | 4 | Accessories: P25HY 20-tons winch; front transport container; Used mostly to disassemble wooden bridge piles from the bank. |
| Rigitrac SKH 120; TRAK 4×4 GL Rigitrac SKH 120 | | Switzerland | Tractor | 15 | 2008 | 15 | Used in logistics centers as a towing machine. |
| Rigitrac SKH 95; TRAK 4×4 GL Rigitrac SKH 95 Fuer LW | (illustration) | Switzerland | Tractor | – | – | – | Used in logistics centers as a towing machine. |
Handling equipment
| Dieci Apollo 25.6; Teleskoplader GG 5 tons 4×4 gl | (illustration) | Italy | Telehandler | 102 | 2022 | 102 | Successor of the Fug 93. Orders: 2017: 102 ordered; 35 for engineering and rescue teams; 67 for logistics |
| Kalmar DCG150-12 | – | Sweden | Heavy forklift | 19 | 2020 | 19 | |
| Linde H30D 393 | (illustration) | Germany | Forklift | 150 | – | 150 | Successor of the Steinbock 2t. Ordered with the Armament programme 2010, with a budget of CHF 14.3 million. |
| Manitou M30-4; DFG 4×4 gl | | France | Forklift | 20 | 2020 | 20 | |

== Boats ==
| Model | Image | Origin | Type | Acquired | In service since | Quantity (2024) | Notes |
|---|---|---|---|---|---|---|---|
| Watercat 1250; Patrouillenboot 16 | | Finland; Switzerland | Patrol boat | 14 | 2019 | 14 | Ordered with the Armament programme 2016, with a budget of CHF 49 million. Designed by Marine Alutech Oy Ab, manufactured by Teijo Shiptec. Equipped with Protector M151. |

== Electronic systems ==
=== Communication systems ===
| Model | Image | Origin | Type | Acquired | In service since | Quantity (2024) | Notes |
Field telephones
| Feldtelefon 96 (Ftf 96) | | Switzerland | Field telephone | – | 1997 | – | |
Communication network
| RUAG Ersa IMFS; Integrated Military Telecommunications System | – | Switzerland | Communication network system | – | 2026 | – | Replacement ongoing. |
| R-905; Richtstrahlstation 905 | | Switzerland | Tactical directional radio relay | 1,100 | 2000 | 1,100 | The system includes: R905 directional communication module; BSG 93 encryption system (Omnisec SA); Fibre optic cable rollers (Brugg Telecom SA); Orders through armament programmes: 1998, 700 R-905, 125 BSG 93, 2,400 fibre optic rollers; 2002, 400 R-905, unknown quantity of BSG 93, 205 fibre optic rollers.; Being replaced by the R-990 - Thales TRC-4100. |
| R-990 - Thales TRC-4100 | – | Switzerland | Tactical directional radio relay | 800 | 2026 | 800 | Successor of the R-905, acquired through the Armament Programme 2020. 200 Mbit/s of datat transmission in both direction with a 90 km range. This acquisition is part of the project TK-A. |
Radio systems
| Thomson-CSF PR4G station principale SE-235 / 435 | SE-235 SE-435 | France | VHF / UHF, portable and mobile tactical radio system. | — | 1999 | — | Successor of the SE-227 and the SE-412, acquired through the Armament Programme 1996, 1999, 2002. It is integrated to the CNRI (Combat Net Radio Interface). |
| Thomson-CSF PR4G émetteur-récepteur individuel SE-135 | | France | VHF / UHF, light portable tactical encrypted radio system | – | 1999 | – | |
| Ascom Systec Pentacom; SE-138 | | Switzerland | VHF, light portable tactical radio system | – | 1999 | – | |
| Elbit E-LynX | – | Israel | VHF / UHF, portable and mobile tactical SDR | – | 2026 | – | Successor of the SE-125 radio systems of the Army, acquired with the Armament Programme 2020. This acquisition is part of the project TK-A. Systems purchased: 1,800 systems for command and control vehicles; 1,050 systems for command posts; 510 portable systems for field use; 230 systems for training; 25 systems for trial |
SIGINT
| IFASS | | Israel | SIGINT antenna | – | – | – | Integrated Radio Intelligence and Broadcasting System. |

=== Miscellaneous accessories ===
| Model | Image | Origin | Type | Acquired | Notes |
Soldiers accessories
| VarioRay LLM; Laser-Licht-Modul 19 (LLM19) | | Germany | Laser sight / tactical light | 9'640 | Made by Rheinmetall Soldier Electronics GmbH. Ordered with the Armament Programme 2019, to replace the REM096, delivered in 2020–2022. |
| LEICA BIG 25; Restlichtverstärker 95/19 (RLV95/19) | – | Switzerland | Night vision goggles (3rd generation) | 5'700 | Acquired with the Armament Programme 1995, modified by Safran Vectronix with the Armament Programme 2019 with 4G image intensifier tubes supplied by Photonis. |
| new NYX™ Restlichtverstärker 19 (RLV19) | Illustration (AN PVS-31D, derived from NYX) | Greece; Switzerland | Night vision goggles (4th generation) | 8'385 | Acquired with the Armament Programme 2019. Designed by Theon Sensors and manufactured by Safran Vectronix AG, equipped with 4G image intensifier tubes supplied by Photonis. |
| L3Harris GPNVG-18 | Illustration | United States | Night vision goggles (4th generation) | – | Used with ARD 10. |
Observation and reconnaissance equipment
| Safran MOSKITO TI™ Wärmebildgerät Medium Range 19 (WBG MR 19) | | Switzerland | Multifunction IR goggles (laser range finder, laser pointer, compass, inclinometers) | 340 | Designed and madeby Safran Vectronix AG, ordered with the Armament Programme 2019. Used as an observation tool, can be used to transmit images to command. |
| Safran JIM Compact™ Wärmebildgerät Long Range 19 (WBG LR 19, sensor for TASYS SMALL) | | Switzerland | Multifunction IR goggles (laser range finder, laser pointer, GPS, inclinometers) | 700 | Designed and made by Safran Vectronix AG, ordered with the Armament Programme 2019. To equip all artillery reconnaissance vehicle (Eagle V 6x6, Eagle III Mech Aufkl, Eagle III Schiesskdt and MB 300 TASYS Klein). |
| WESCAM MX™ - RSTA - TASYS | | Canada | EO / IR (observation / reconnaissance) | – | It equips the Mowag Eagle V 6×6 TASYS, and some are also used for dismounted troops. |

== Air defence ==
=== Air surveillance ===
| Model | Image | Origin | Type | In service since | Quantity (2024) | Notes |
Active air surveillance radars
| AN/TPS-75 (FLORES) | | United States; France | Fixed, 3D, S-band (IEEE), PESA, air-search and early warning radar | 2004 | 4 | The radars were modernised in 2022. This radar feeds the FLORAK0 air surveillance and mission command system. The FLORAKO system is being replaced by the Thales Skyview system as part of the Air2030 programme. 4 radar sites exist, Mount Pilatus, Scopi, Weisshorn and Weissfluh made by ThalesRaytheonSystems. |
| AN/TPS-70; Tactical Flight Radar (TAFLIR) | | United States | Mobile 3D, S-band (IEEE), PESA, air-search and early warning radar | 1985 | 5 | The radar is to be replaced by the Tmob Radar MR. This radar feeds the FLORAK0 air surveillance and mission command system. The FLORAKO system is being replaced by the Thales Skyview system as part of the Air2030 programme. |
Passive air surveillance radars
| Hensoldt Twinvis; SILENZIO passive radar system | | Germany | Passive radar | 2024 | 3 (+30 planned) | Financing and order with Armament Programme 2024, budget CHF 120 million. Armament Programme 2025, budget CHF 80 million additionally. |
Military airport radars
| Hensoldt ASR-S; Flugplatz Luftraum Überwachungsradar (FLUR) | (illustration) | Germany | Airport Surveillance Radar | – | 5 | Ordered with the Armament Programme 2009, supplied by Hensoldt and EADS Cassidian. Installed at the air bases of Payerne, Emmen, Locarno, Meiringen and Sion. This radar replaced the FLUR 90. |
| Selex PAR 2090 CF; Militärisches Anflugleitsystem Plus (MALS Plus) | | Italy | Precision Approach Radar | – | 6 | Ordered with the Armament Programme 2009, supplied by Selex, through EADS Cassidian. Installed at the air bases of Payerne, Emmen, Locarno, Meiringen, Sion. This radar replaced the QUADRADAR. |

=== Air defence systems ===
| Model | Image | Origin | Type | Acquired | In service since | Quantity (2025) | Notes |
Stinger units
| FIM-92 Stinger; Leichtes Fliegerabwehr-Lenkwaffensystem Stinger | | United States; Switzerland | MANPADS launcher | 480 | 1994 | 96 | Manufactured under licence by Eidg. Flugzeugwerk Emmen F+W (RUAG today). According to 2025 information, 96 launchers remain in service. |
| FIM-92 Stinger; Leichtes Fliegerabwehr-Lenkwaffensystem Stinger | | United States; Switzerland | MANPADS missile | 3,500 | 1994 | – | Manufactured under licence by Eidg. Flugzeugwerk Emmen F+W (RUAG today). According to 2025 information, 96 launchers remain in service. |
| AN/PPQ-2 PSTAR (Alert STI) | | United States | Mobile, 3D, S-band (IEEE), surveillance radar | 24 | 2002 | 24 | Ordered with the Armament Programme 2002, budget CHF70 million to Lockheed Martin NE&SS-Radar Systems. Installed on a trailer, and used as a surveillance system for the Stinger air-defence units. |
Oerlikon GDF-005 units
| Oerlikon GDF-005 modified 35 mm Fliegerabwehrkanone 63/12 | | Switzerland | Anti-air twin canon | – | 1963 | 24 | Modified from the GDF-001 / 002 (Fliegerabwehrkanone 63) to make it compatible with the AHEAD ammunition. |
| Oerlikon Skyguard; Feuerleitgerät 75/10 Skyguard (Flt Gt 75/10) | | Switzerland | Fire control system | – | 1975 | – | Fire control system of the GDF-005, equipped with radar and optical sensors. |

== Aircraft ==
=== UAV in the Swiss Army ===
Intermediate phase with a certain number of drones acquired to build up competences, experience and doctrine prior to a future step. Intent to expend UAV use in 2024.

| Model | Image | Origin | Type | Role | Acquired | In service since | Quantity (2024) | Notes |
Fixed wing
| Orbiter 2B | | Israel | Mini-UAV, FLIR | ISTAR | 3 | – | 3 | Ordered to Aeronautics Defense in 2020, budget for it included in the Armament Programme 2019. At the moment, only used by professional military forces (special forces and artillery). |
Multicopter
| Lockheed Martin Indago 3 | (illustration picture) | United States | Mini-UAV | ISR | 7 | – | 7 | Ordered to in 2020, budget included in the Armament Programme 2019. Used with the special forces, combat troops and rescue troops. Equipment of the Swiss variant: Transponder (collision avoidance); Silvus Technologies radio; Lockheed Martin CDL Systems, VCSi Ground Control System software (with Swiss maps, digital terrain elevation data (DTED), and Geofencing) |
| DJI Mavic 2 Enterprise Advanced | | China | Mini-UAV | EOD surveillance | 4 | – | 4 | |
| ANAFI/T SE; ANAFI Thermal | | France; Switzerland | Mini-UAV, FLIR | Training drone | 74 | 2020 | 74 | Ordered to Parrot / SenseFly in 2020, budget for it included in the Armament Programme 2019, and part of the programme "Swiss Mini UAV Program” (Swiss MUAS). Purchased to be used as a training drone for the troops. |
Helicopter
| Teledyne FLIR Defense Black Hornet 4 PRS | | Norway | Nano-UAV, FLIR | ISR | – | – | – | 19 0rdered in 2020, budget for it included in the Armament Programme 2019, used with the ARD 10. Additional approved for order with the Armament Programme 2025, and ordered in February 2026. |

== Future equipment ==
This is a list of equipment under order.

=== Indirect fire systems ===
| Model | Image | Origin | Type | Calibre | Quantity | Delivery (planned) | Budget | Notes |
Artillery
| Piranha IV 10×10 - AAC / KNDS AGM; Artillerie Wirkplattform und Wirkmittel 2026 | | Switzerland; Germany | SPH | 155 mm L/52 | 32 | From 2032 | CHF 850 million | Selected as the successor of the M109 KAWEST WE. Financed with the Armament programme 2025. Contract signed in June 2026, serial production to start in 2031. The contract includes: 1 prototype system; 32 systems; 32 reloading containers |
| 155 mm transport container | (illustration) | Switzerland | 20 feet ammunition container | 155 mm | 32 | From 2032 | CHF xxx million | Selected as the successor of the M109 KAWEST WE. Financed with the Armament programme 2025. Contract signed in June 2026, serial production to start in 2031. The contract includes: 1 prototype system; 32 systems; 32 reloading containers |
Mortars
| Mowag Piranha IV / RUAG Cobra; 12 cm Mörser 16 | | Switzerland | Mortar carrier | 120 mm | 48 | 2026 | CHF 579 million | Developed to recover the mobile artillery that was abandoned in 2010 with the retirement of the M113 A1 Minenwerfer Panzer 64/91. Orders: 2016; 32 × Cobra systems; 12 × Iveco Trakker armoured transport trucks; 36 × 120mm ammunition transport container; 2022; 16 × Cobra systems; unknown × Iveco Trakker armoured transport trucks; unknown × 120mm ammunition transport container; The programme includes the modification of the Mowag Eagle III |
| Iveco Trakker | (illustration) | Italy | Armoured truck with hooklift system | – | > 12 | 2026 | CHF 579 million | Developed to recover the mobile artillery that was abandoned in 2010 with the retirement of the M113 A1 Minenwerfer Panzer 64/91. Orders: 2016; 32 × Cobra systems; 12 × Iveco Trakker armoured transport trucks; 36 × 120mm ammunition transport container; 2022; 16 × Cobra systems; unknown × Iveco Trakker armoured transport trucks; unknown × 120mm ammunition transport container; The programme includes the modification of the Mowag Eagle III |
| Mowag Eagle III | | Switzerland | Artillery fire command vehicle | – | 16 | 2026 | CHF 579 million | Developed to recover the mobile artillery that was abandoned in 2010 with the retirement of the M113 A1 Minenwerfer Panzer 64/91. Orders: 2016; 32 × Cobra systems; 12 × Iveco Trakker armoured transport trucks; 36 × 120mm ammunition transport container; 2022; 16 × Cobra systems; unknown × Iveco Trakker armoured transport trucks; unknown × 120mm ammunition transport container; The programme includes the modification of the Mowag Eagle III |
| 120 mm transport container | | Switzerland | 20 feet ammunition container | 120 mm | > 36 | 2026 | CHF 579 million | Developed to recover the mobile artillery that was abandoned in 2010 with the retirement of the M113 A1 Minenwerfer Panzer 64/91. Orders: 2016; 32 × Cobra systems; 12 × Iveco Trakker armoured transport trucks; 36 × 120mm ammunition transport container; 2022; 16 × Cobra systems; unknown × Iveco Trakker armoured transport trucks; unknown × 120mm ammunition transport container; The programme includes the modification of the Mowag Eagle III |
| Rheinmetall-Expal 81 mm ammunition | (illustration) | Germany; Spain | Illumination and smoke mortar ammunitions | 81 mm | – | – | – | Ordered in July 2024.: flare cartridge (white light); flare cartridge (infrared); smoke cartridge based on red phosphorus; Expal ammo design, manufactured by Rheinmetall Waffe Munition GmbH at the Neuenburg am Rhein plant. |

=== Vehicles and vehicle accessories ===
| Model | Image | Origin | Type | Quantity | Delivery | Budget | Notes |
Sapper and engineering vehicles
| Mowag Piranha IV AEV; Pionier Panzerfahrzeug 21 (PiPz 21) | | Switzerland | AEV / Sapper vehicle | 84 | 2026 | CHF 577 million | Programme: replacement of the M113 A1 Minenräumpanzer 63/00 and the M113 A1 Sappeur Panzer 63/05. Orders: 2021: 60; 2022: 24 a a Sapper equipment on the vehicle: Equipment supplied by GCS: 84 × Quick Coupler Adapter for the equipment; 60 × combat dozer blades; 24 × remote manipulator arms; Cameras for the driver and for the technician; 2 × light spots at the front of each vehicle; Equipment supplied by Pearson: 12 × mine ploughs.; 24 Mini-UAV; Other equipment: Kongsberg Protector RWS |
Special forces vehicles
| Defenture VECTOR | | Netherlands | Light tactical vehicle | Unknown | Unknown | Unknown | Programme: replacement of the AGF Serval (LAuF 06). Prototype delivered to the Swiss Army in February 2021. An order for the system was confirmed in December 2023 after a trial period. Vehicle intended for the special forces, among which the ARD 10. |
Accessory for vehicles
| SSZ Camouflage - MMCC | (Illustration of the MMCC in Czech service) | Switzerland | Multi-spectral camouflage for vehicles | Unknown | Unknown | Unknown | Programme: Multispektrale Tarnsysteme. Selected in November 2025, different systems for different applications. |
| Saro GmbH | – | Germany | Multi-spectral camouflage for vehicles | Unknown | Unknown | Unknown | Programme: Multispektrale Tarnsysteme. Selected in November 2025, different systems for different applications. |
| Saab Barracuda Mobile Camouflage System | (Illustration of the Barracuda on the RCH-155) | Sweden | Multi-spectral camouflage for vehicles | Unknown | Unknown | Unknown | Programme: Multispektrale Tarnsysteme. Selected in November 2025, different systems for different applications. |

=== Air defence systems ===
| Model | Image | Origin | Type | Quantity | Delivery | Budget | Notes |
Sidearms
| Thales GM200 MM/A | | France | Semi-mobile 4D, AESA, S-band (IEEE), early warning radar | | 2030 | CHF 150 millions | Purchased as part of the Armament Programme 2026, replacing the TAFLIR radar, part of the Tmob Radar MR (Teilmobiles Radarsysteme mittler Reichweite - Mobile tactical radars - medium range). Five systems are expected in total. |
| Leonardo TMMR | (Illustration) | Italy | Mobile, C-band (IEEE), AESA, GaN, short range, lower airspace suveillance radar | 1 (+ additional planned) | 2026 | – | To be purchased with the Armament Programme 2028, when the system purchase is approved with the testing by the troops. |
MIM-104 Patriot PAC-3+ systems
| MIM-104 Patriot PAC-3+ fire units | | United States | Medium-to-long range SAM system fire unit | 5 | Unknown | Unknown real cost after US delays (Budget: CHF 1,987 million Contract: CHF 1,200 million) | Selected in 2021, and financed in the Armament Programme 2022. Additional missiles ordered in 2023 and financed in the Armament programme 2023. Delays with unknown delivery timeline announced in 2025. |
| AN/MSQ-132 TOC-E | | United States | Fire control station | 5 | Unknown | Unknown real cost after US delays (Budget: CHF 1,987 million Contract: CHF 1,200 million) | |
| TOC-C | – | United States | Coordination of the air-defence mission | 3 | Unknown | Unknown real cost after US delays (Budget: CHF 1,987 million Contract: CHF 1,200 million) | |
| AN/MPQ-65A | | United States | Semi-trailer, 4D, C-band (IEEE), AESA, GaN, air surveillance and target acquisition radar | 5 | Unknown | Unknown real cost after US delays (Budget: CHF 1,987 million Contract: CHF 1,200 million) | Radar 360°, with a primary direction. |
| EPP RADAR-V | (illustration of a different variant of the power plant) | Germany | Electrical power plant for radar | 5 | Unknown | Unknown real cost after US delays (Budget: CHF 1,987 million Contract: CHF 1,200 million) | Supplied by Vincorion. |
| M903 | | United States | TEL (launching station) | 17 | Unknown | Unknown real cost after US delays (Budget: CHF 1,987 million Contract: CHF 1,200 million) | |
| OE-349 Antenna Mast Group | | United States | UHF communications array | 7 | Unknown | Unknown real cost after US delays (Budget: CHF 1,987 million Contract: CHF 1,200 million) | |
| PAC-2 GEM-T (Raytheon MIM-104E) | | United States; Germany | Long range SAM (GaN transceivers for the semi-active radar homing of the TVM system) | 70 | Unknown | Unknown real cost after US delays (Budget: CHF 1,987 million Contract: CHF 1,200 million) | Note: MBDA Deutschland GmbH will manufacture the GEM-T missiles for European clients of Raytheon. |
| Iveco MLT | (illustration of the same truck model) | Italy | Semi-trucks / 8×8 trucks | ~ 42 | Unknown | Unknown real cost after US delays (Budget: CHF 1,987 million Contract: CHF 1,200 million) | |
| PAC-3 MSE (Lockheed Martin) | | United States | Medium range SAM | 72 | Unknown | CHF 300 million | Complementary missile order to Lockheed Martin in 2023, budget for it included in the Armament Programme 2023, and part of the programme "Air2030 BODLUV”. |
IRIS-T SLM system
| IRIS-T SLM fire unit | | Germany | Short-to-medium range SAM system fire unit | 5 (+2 to be ordered) | – | CHF 1.5 billion | Bodluv MR, sub-project of the Air 2030 programme, replacement of the M Flab (Rapier). Tender launched the 30 April 2024, and won by Diehl, only supplier making an offer. Phase 1: Budget: CHF 660 million; Contract: CHF 500 million for 5 fire units; Phase 2: Armament programme 2026, budget of CHF 1 billion for: 2 fire units; more missiles; more training capacity; more spare parts and test systems |
| Fortion IBMS-FC (Airbus Defence / Diehl Defence) | | Germany | Fire control station | 5 (+2 to be ordered) | – | CHF 1.5 billion | Bodluv MR, sub-project of the Air 2030 programme, replacement of the M Flab (Rapier). Tender launched the 30 April 2024, and won by Diehl, only supplier making an offer. Phase 1: Budget: CHF 660 million; Contract: CHF 500 million for 5 fire units; Phase 2: Armament programme 2026, budget of CHF 1 billion for: 2 fire units; more missiles; more training capacity; more spare parts and test systems |
| Hensoldt TRML-4D | | Germany | 4D, C-band (IEEE), AESA, GaN, air surveillance and target acquisition radar | 5 (+2 to be ordered) | – | CHF 1.5 billion | Bodluv MR, sub-project of the Air 2030 programme, replacement of the M Flab (Rapier). Tender launched the 30 April 2024, and won by Diehl, only supplier making an offer. Phase 1: Budget: CHF 660 million; Contract: CHF 500 million for 5 fire units; Phase 2: Armament programme 2026, budget of CHF 1 billion for: 2 fire units; more missiles; more training capacity; more spare parts and test systems |
| IRIS-T SLM TEL | | Germany | TEL (launching station) | 15 (+6 to be ordered) | – | CHF 1.5 billion | Bodluv MR, sub-project of the Air 2030 programme, replacement of the M Flab (Rapier). Tender launched the 30 April 2024, and won by Diehl, only supplier making an offer. Phase 1: Budget: CHF 660 million; Contract: CHF 500 million for 5 fire units; Phase 2: Armament programme 2026, budget of CHF 1 billion for: 2 fire units; more missiles; more training capacity; more spare parts and test systems |
| IRIS-T SLM missile | | Germany; Norway; Sweden; Italy; Greece; Spain | Short-to-medium range SAM | Unknown | – | CHF 1.5 billion | Bodluv MR, sub-project of the Air 2030 programme, replacement of the M Flab (Rapier). Tender launched the 30 April 2024, and won by Diehl, only supplier making an offer. Phase 1: Budget: CHF 660 million; Contract: CHF 500 million for 5 fire units; Phase 2: Armament programme 2026, budget of CHF 1 billion for: 2 fire units; more missiles; more training capacity; more spare parts and test systems |
Anti-drone defence systems
| SecuriDrone | – | Switzerland | C-UAS semi-mobile system | – | – | CHF 3.5 million | In July 2025, the Swiss Army planned to purchase an anti-drone system, and to develop competences in the field. A system was tested and was urgently ordered to protect the infrastructure in November 2025. The system is supplied by Securiton. |

== Equipment planned to be ordered ==
=== Infantry weapons ===
| Project / programme | Model | Image | Origin | Type | Calibre | Quantity | Delivery | Notes |
Small arms
| Replacement of the Pistol 75 | SIG P 320; Pistol 9 mm CH A NG | | United States; Switzerland | Semi-automatic pistol | 9×19mm Parabellum | 60,000 | – | New standard issue pistol selected in 2025. Up to 140,000 pistols are expected to be ordered over its service life. The firm orders are: 60,000 with the Armament programme 2026 It was in competition against the: Glock G45 Gen 5; Heckler & Koch SFP9 |
Explosive weapons
| Replacement of the BGM-71 TOW | Spike LR2 | | Israel; Germany | ATGM | 130 mm | Unknown | – | Selected in 2023 to replaced the TOW, but no order has yet been placed. Financing and order with Armament Programme 2024, budget CHF 200 million. |

=== Indirect fire ===
| Project / programme | Potential model | Image | Origin | Type | Range | Quantity | Delivery | Notes |
|---|---|---|---|---|---|---|---|---|
| Acquisition of rocket artillery capacity | EuroPULS / MARS 3 (KNDS De / Elbit) | | Israel; Germany | MLRS | ≤ 300 km (190 mi) | – | – | Purchase intention for a system with a range ≥ 100 km (62 mi). |
| Acquisition of rocket artillery capacity | GMARS (Rheinmetall / Lockheed Martin) | – | Germany; United States | MLRS | 499 km (310 mi) | – | – | Purchase intention for a system with a range ≥ 100 km (62 mi). |
| Acquisition of rocket artillery capacity | HIMARS (Lockheed Martin) | | United States | MLRS | 499 km (310 mi) | – | – | Purchase intention for a system with a range ≥ 100 km (62 mi). |
| Acquisition of rocket artillery capacity | X-Fire (Thales / ArianeGroupe / Soframe) | – | France | MLRS | ≤ 1,000 km (620 mi) | – | – | Purchase intention for a system with a range ≥ 100 km (62 mi). |
| Acquisition of rocket artillery capacity | Thundart (MBDA / Safran) | – | France | MLRS | ≤ 500 km (310 mi) | – | – | Purchase intention for a system with a range ≥ 100 km (62 mi). |
| Acquisition of rocket artillery capacity | K239 Chunmoo (Hanwha) | | South Korea | MLRS | ≤ 1,000 km (620 mi) | – | – | Purchase intention for a system with a range ≥ 100 km (62 mi). |

=== Armoured vehicles ===
| Project / programme | Model | Image | Origin | Type | Quantity | Delivery | Notes |
Armoured fighting vehicles
| Replacement of the Mowag Piranha IIC 8×8; Radschützenpanzer 93 | Mowag Piranha IV | | Switzerland | Wheeled IFV | Unknown | Early 2030s | |
| Replacement of the Mowag Piranha IIC 8×8; Radschützenpanzer 93 | Mowag Piranha V | | Switzerland | Wheeled IFV | Unknown | Early 2030s | |
Armoured vehicles (APC, command and reconnaissance vehicles)
| Replacement of the Mowag Eagle I / Eagle II; Aufklärungsfahrzeug 93 / 97 | Mowag Eagle V 4×4 / Mowag Piranha IV 6×6 (likely) | | Switzerland | Reconnaissance vehicle | Unknown | 2033 | |
| Replacement of the M113A1 Kdo Pz 63/07; Führungsfahrzeug Kat. 3 | Mowag Eagle V 6×6 | (Illustration of the base vehicle) | Switzerland | Armoured command vehicle | Unknown | 2026 | There was a planned to order the vehicles in two batches, and it was delayed to focus on air defence.: Batch 1 to be ordered with the Armament Programme 2024, budget CHF 260 million; Batch 2 to be ordered with the Armament Programme 2026 / 27, budget unknown |
| Replacement of the Mowag Eagle III; Schiesskommandanten Fahrzeug INTAFF (SKdt Fz INTAFF) | Mowag Eagle V 6×6 (likely) | (Illustration of base vehicle) | Switzerland | Artillery observer vehicle, and artillery command post | Unknown | 2033 | |
| Replacement of the Mowag Piranha IB 6×6; Sanitätspanzer | Mowag Eagle V 6×6 (likely) | | Switzerland | Armoured ambulance | Unknown | Early 2030s | |
Armoured vehicles (electronic warfare)
| SawFish | Mowag Piranha V | | Switzerland; Germany; Netherlands | ELINT / electronic reconnaissance | Unknown | End 2020s | MoU to join the project with the Netherlands and Germany in November 2025. |
| KnifeFish | Mowag Piranha V | (illustration Piranha V with mast) | Switzerland; Netherlands | Electronic warfare attack (jamming / counter-measures) | Unknown | End 2020s | MoU to join the project with the Netherlands in October 2026. |

=== Air defence ===
| Project / programme | Model | Image | Origin | Type | Delivery | Notes |
Air defence systems
| Complementary long range air defence system | SAMP/T /NG | | France; Italy | Medium to long range SAM | – | The delays of the Patriot air defence system deliveries pushed Switzerland to consider a complementary purchase. |
| Complementary long range air defence system | Barak MX | | Israel | Medium to long range SAM | – | The delays of the Patriot air defence system deliveries pushed Switzerland to consider a complementary purchase. |
Short range air defence systems
| Replacement of the Oerlikon GDF-005, through the Bodluv KR mob Programme; Systeme der bodengestützten Luftverteidigung kurze Reichweite mobile | Skynex | | Switzerland | Semi-stationary anti-air gun | 2028 | The 35 mm Fliegerabwehrkanone 63/12 will need to be replaced from 2032; As of February 2026, the Swiss Army announced the project for the Skyranger system was under negotiation. In the Armament Programme 2026, a first phase will show the purchase of Skynex systems (CHF 800 million) based on trucks. And later on, a Skyranger solution is expected. |
| Replacement of the Oerlikon GDF-005, through the Bodluv KR mob Programme; Systeme der bodengestützten Luftverteidigung kurze Reichweite mobile | Skyranger 30 on Piranha IV | | Switzerland | Self-propelled anti-air gun | 2032 | The 35 mm Fliegerabwehrkanone 63/12 will need to be replaced from 2032; As of February 2026, the Swiss Army announced the project for the Skyranger system was under negotiation. In the Armament Programme 2026, a first phase will show the purchase of Skynex systems (CHF 800 million) based on trucks. And later on, a Skyranger solution is expected. |
Sidearms
| Replacement of the FIM-92 Stinger | Mistral 3 | | France | MANPADS | 2032 | Replacement of the Stinger as they will reach their end of life. Potential for modernising the Stinger missiles. |
| Replacement of the FIM-92 Stinger | Fulgur | – | Italy | MANPADS | 2032 | Replacement of the Stinger as they will reach their end of life. Potential for modernising the Stinger missiles. |
| Replacement of the FIM-92 Stinger | RBS-70 NG with Bolide NG | | Sweden | MANPADS | 2032 | Replacement of the Stinger as they will reach their end of life. Potential for modernising the Stinger missiles. |
| Replacement of the FIM-92 Stinger | Starstreak | | United Kingdom | MANPADS | 2032 | Replacement of the Stinger as they will reach their end of life. Potential for modernising the Stinger missiles. |
| Replacement of the FIM-92 Stinger | FIM-92K Stinger | | United States | MANPADS | 2032 | Replacement of the Stinger as they will reach their end of life. Potential for modernising the Stinger missiles. |

=== Unmanned aerial vehicles ===
| Project / programme | Model | Image | Origin | Type | Role | Quantity | Delivery | Notes |
|---|---|---|---|---|---|---|---|---|
| Mini-UAV | Unknown | (illustration picture) | – | Mini-UAV | ISR | – | – | Financing and order with Armament Programme 2024, budget CHF 20 million. Additional budget of CHF 108 million provided in September 2025. Companies involved in research: PMRobotics; Skysec Defence; Diehl Defence |
| Taskforce drones | Unknown | – | Switzerland | – | Loitering munitions | – | – | |
| Taskforce drones | CDDS | – | Switzerland | – | C-UAS | – | – | |

== Reserve ==
| Model | Image | Origin | Type | Removed from service | Quantity (2026) | Notes |
|---|---|---|---|---|---|---|
| Leopard 2A4; Panzer 87 | | West Germany; Switzerland | MBT | – | 71 | Among the 380 purchased, 134 are in service, 71 remain in the reserve, some were modified for an engineering use, and the rest was re-exported. The army wishes to reactivate 46 tanks (12 for training, 34 to modernise for active service), and keep 25 tanks in reserve for spare parts. |
| Mowag Eagle I Aufklärungsfahrzeug 93 | | Switzerland | Armoured reconnaissance vehicle | 2019 | 156 | |
