= Women's Army Service =

Women's branch of the Swiss Army (1939–2004)

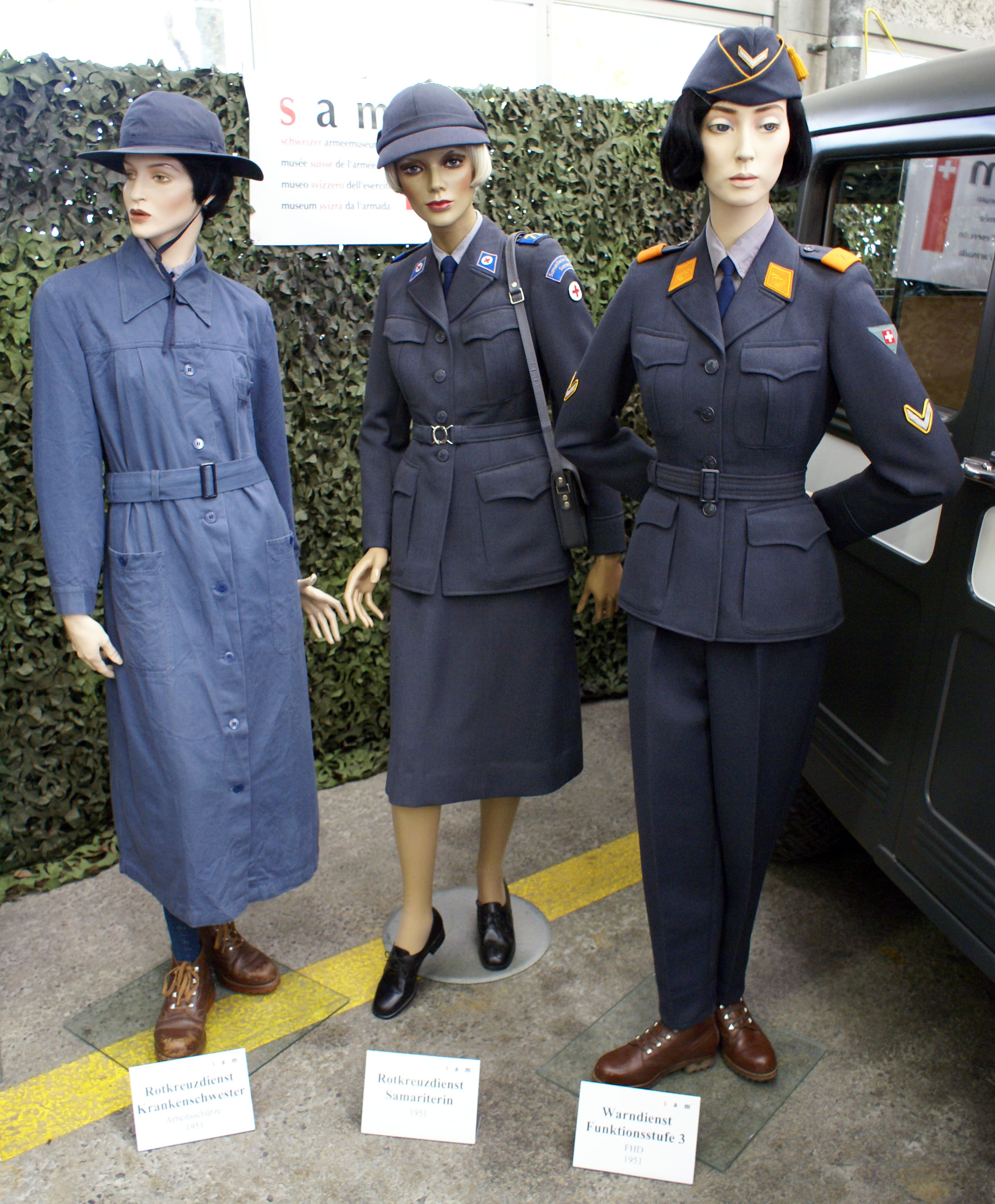
Women's Auxiliary Service uniforms, 1951

The Women's Army Service (German: Militärischer Frauendienst, MFD; French: Service féminin de l'armée, SFA) was the organization through which women served in the Swiss Army from 1939 until its dissolution in the 2000s, when women were integrated into the regular army on equal terms with men.

Over its history it was known successively as the Women's Auxiliary Service (German: Frauenhilfsdienst, FHD; French: Service complémentaire féminin, SCF), the Women's Army Service (German: Militärischer Frauendienst; French: Service féminin de l'armée), and the Women in the Army Service (German: Dienststelle Frauen in der Armee, DFA; French: Service Femmes dans l'armée, FDA).

== Origins ==
In the early 20th century the Association of Swiss Women and the Alliance of Swiss Women's Societies called for compulsory women's service in national defense; such an obligation was never introduced. In 1903 legislation provided for the employment of women within the framework of the Red Cross. Between 1914 and 1918 women worked in soldiers' welfare centers, in the Red Cross service, and, during the Spanish flu epidemic of 1918, in military infirmaries. In 1934 the federal decree on civil air defense required women to take part in that civilian organization, and in January 1939 the women's associations recommended that they enroll in the army's auxiliary services.

In early April 1939 an ordinance on complementary service created the Women's Auxiliary Service, incorporated the Red Cross service into it, and placed it under the responsibility of the cantons. About a thousand volunteers enrolled for motor transport service with the Touring Club and the Automobile Club.

== Second World War ==
At the general mobilization of September 1939, thousands more women were willing to serve, but men—and employers, who needed the labor—were reluctant. Some commanders employed women for secretarial work without giving them any legal status. The example of the Finnish Lottas in the Finno-Russian War (1939–1940) accelerated the integration of women into the Swiss army. On 27 January 1940 the Military Department placed the FHD under the army's territorial service, and on 2 February General Henri Guisan issued directives on its organization. A distinction was drawn between the civilian FHD (soldiers' laundry, army social services, and the like) and the military FHD.

The military FHD was employed for tasks in health care, administration, communications, transport, welfare, motor transport, aircraft spotting, cooking, and field post, freeing men for the combat troops. Their number rose to more than 18,000 by the end of 1940 and 23,000 by the end of 1941, and stood at 17,000 in May 1945; in total they performed 3,695,476 days of service, with a permanent strength of 3,000 women under arms during the active service period.

== Postwar reorganization ==
After the war the FHD became a cadre organization subordinate to the general staff group, able to incorporate thousands of volunteers if needed, and the Red Cross service regained its independence. The FHD was led first by Colonel Ernst Vaterlaus, then by Hedwig Schudel (1946–1951) and Andrée Weitzel (1953–1976). At their own request, members were discharged on marriage, childbirth, or after ninety days of service; from 1962 they could transfer to the reserve.

== Equality and integration ==
The principle of equality written into the Federal Constitution in 1981, together with the army reforms, changed the organization's footing. In 1986 the FHD became the Women's Army Service, subordinate to the training group, and in 1995 it was replaced by the Women in the Army Service under the chief of the army. Women received the same ranks (1986) and served in the same branches, with mixed schools and units (1995) and, under Army XXI, access to all functions, the same length of service, the same personal weapon, and deployment abroad (Swisscoy). The only remaining difference was recruitment, which stayed voluntary. Equality brought about the disappearance of the separate Women's Army Service, women thereafter serving alongside men. Excluding the reserve, there were 1,450 women in 1975, 2,100 in 1980, 2,600 in 1989, 1,265 in 1999, 1,010 in 2007, and 920 in 2010.

Between 1977 and 2005 the FHD, SFA, and FDA were headed by Johanna Hurni (1977–1988), Eugénie Pollak (1989–1998), and Doris Portmann (1998–2005), after which the position was abolished.

== Bibliography ==
- A. Weitzel, La participation de la femme à la défense générale, 1979
- J. Stüssi-Lauterburg, Helvetias Töchter: Frauen in der Schweizer Militärgeschichte von der Entstehung der Eidgenossenschaft bis zur Gründung des Frauenhilfsdienstes (1291–1939), 1989
- D. Heuberger, J. Stüssi-Lauterburg, La femme dans l'armée suisse de 1939 à nos jours, 1990
- B. Signer, Die Frau in der Schweizer Armee, 2000
- R. Stämpfli, Mit der Schürze in die Landesverteidigung: Frauenemanzipation und Schweizer Militär 1914–1945, 2002
- P. Zürcher-Vercelli, "Die Chefs der militärdienstleistenden Frauen von den Anfängen des FHD bis heute", in Info Femmes dans l'armée, 2003, no. 3, 18–24
