= Parachute Reconnaissance Company 17 =

- Fallschirmaufklärer Kompanie 17 (German); Compagnie d'éclaireurs parachutistes (French); Compagnia di esploratori paracadutisti (Italian)
- Active: 1964–1969 (First paratroopers trained); 1970–present
- Country: Switzerland
- Branch: Swiss Air Force
- Type: Special operations forces
- Role: Long range reconnaissance Direct action Unconventional warfare
- Size: Company
- Part of: Switzerland Special Forces Command
- Nickname(s): FSK-17

The Parachute Reconnaissance Company 17 (German: Fallschirmaufklärer Kompanie 17, Fsch Aufkl Kp 17; French: Compagnie d'éclaireurs parachutistes; Italian: Compagnia di esploratori paracadutisti), also known as the Fernspäh-Grenadiers, is one of the main units under Switzerland Special Forces Command. They are organized as a militia long-range reconnaissance and scout unit, unlike the full-time counterterrorism and hostage rescue Army Reconnaissance Detachment 10 (ARD 10) unit.

Formed in the 1970s, they fall under the operational control of the Swiss Air Force.

== History ==
The Parachute Reconnaissance Company 17 (FSK-17) of today, comes from the Remote Reconnaissance Company 17 (Fernspäh Kp 17). The FSK-7 was formed from the first and only Swiss parachute company, the Parachute Grenadier Company 17 (Fallschirmgrenadier Kp 17) in 1969. While the names have changed, the number 17 has been a constant in Switzerland's only parachute company, leading current and former members to refer to themselves as a "17-er".

== Training ==
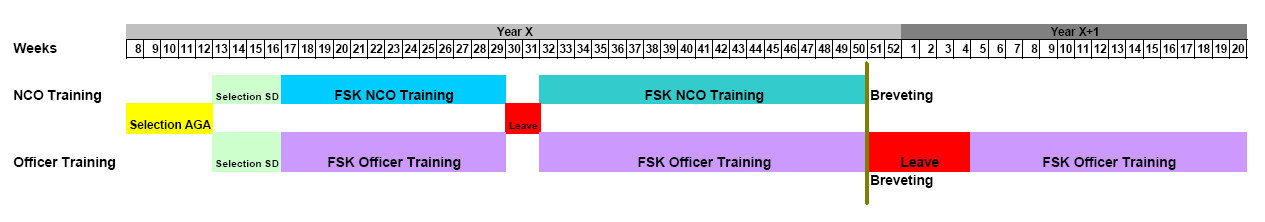
FSK-17 Training program for NCOs and officers

FSK-17, like most of the Swiss Air Force, is a militia based service, which makes selection and training different from in most militaries. At about age 16 a candidate will register online for the SPHAIR course with the Aero-Club der Schweiz. About 500 to 700 candidates will generally apply. Over the following year the candidate will provide documentation to prove their Swiss citizenship and will attend a one-day screening in Dübendorf near Zürich. About 300 candidates will attend the screening but only 90 of them will pass the screening and educational requirements and be allowed to enroll in the parachute courses.

At age 18 the candidate attends the first two-week parachute course. While most of the cost of the course is covered by the Swiss Army, candidates have to buy some of their own equipment and books, which cost the candidate about CHF 750. Successful completion of the first parachute course allows the candidate to attend the second course when they are about 19 years old. This course also costs the candidate about CHF 500. Following two successful parachute courses the candidate will have to pass a series of physical and psychological exams of which only about 20 will pass. Throughout all this training the candidate is still a civilian.

If the candidate is successful in their pre-military training, they then enter either a 43-week (enlisted) or 59-week (officer) training program. Following recruitment into the military the candidate attends a five-week selection training course. This course includes firearms training as well as physical fitness, obstacle courses, and marching. While portions of the standard Swiss Army basic training are included, this course focuses on the elements that are relevant for the company. There are weekly marches of increasing length and difficulty, culminating in the "Ironman" exercise which must be passed by each candidate. Those that fail the training at this point are shifted into another specialization.

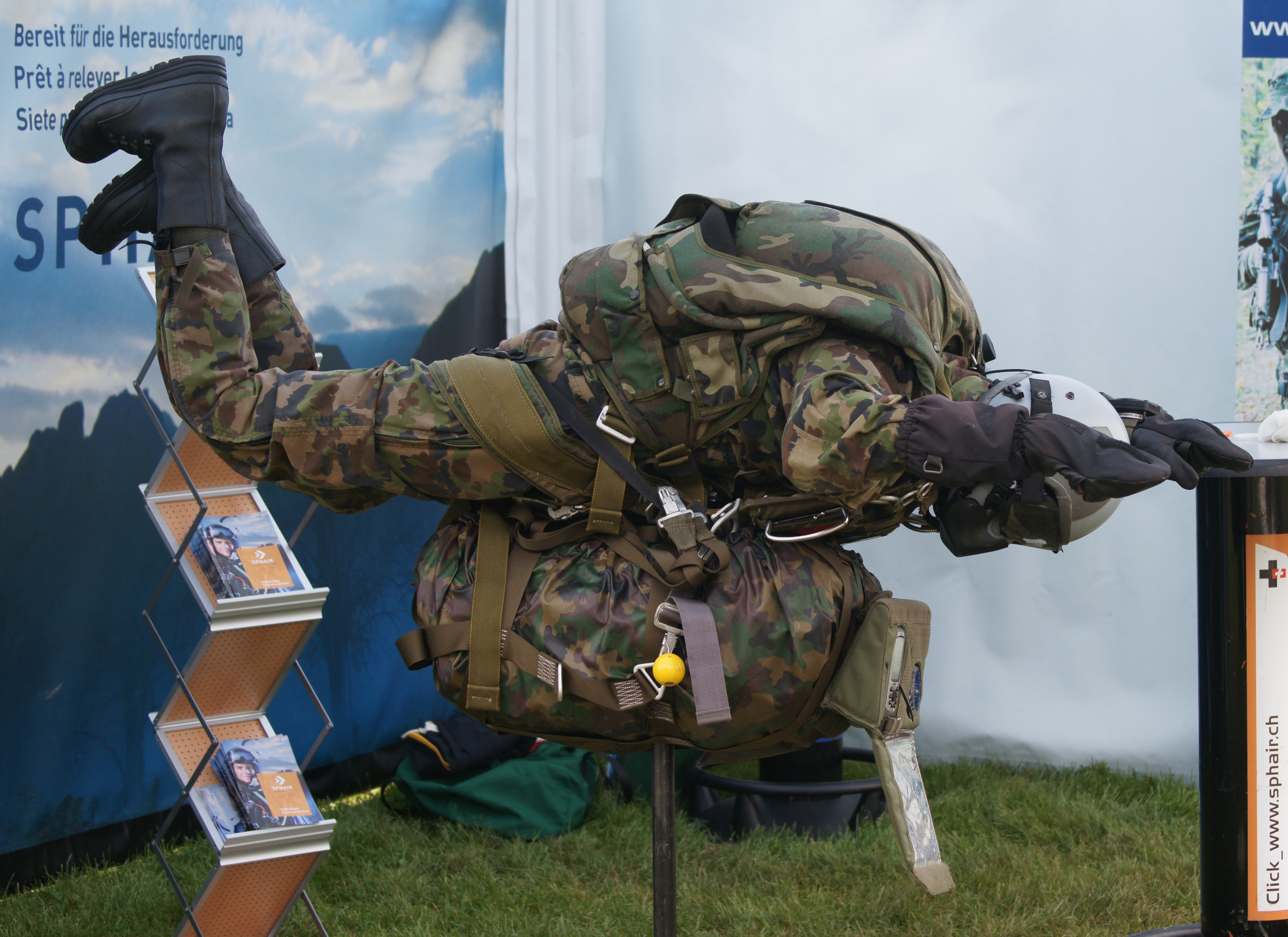
Parachute Reconnaissance Company 17 uniform and gear

Following the five-week course a candidate then enters the second selection phase, a four-week examination of their parachute-related abilities. This course also builds on their civilian parachute experience to train them in military parachuting. Therefore, in the first week they complete a night parachute jump. The course also includes further weapons training, physical training, and computer-aided intelligence training. At the end of the course, some candidates will be dismissed from the training and will complete their military service in another speciality.

The remaining training time is spent working mostly as part of a team. Some individual training relates to building of bivouacs, behaviour and patrolling in the hostile area as well as approaches with contact with dogs. They train with round-canopy T-10 parachutes for low altitude jumps (about 200 m (660 ft) above ground level) as well as HALO/HAHO from over 7,000 m (23,000 ft). Training also includes parachuting into landing zones in the mountains as well as in water. The culmination of this training is a multi-day training exercise in which the different elements of the training in the general context are used. Following successful completion of the entire training course the candidate is breveted and joins the company. The parascouts Company 17 is also in addition, to the Patrouille Suisse, F/A-18 Hornet Solo Display the PC-7 Team, the Hornet Solo Display and the Super Puma Display Team alone or in combination with one or more of these teams an "Air Show Team" of the Swiss Air Force. Regularly occurring events and airshows such as the Air14 or the Flight demonstration Axalp.

== See also ==
- Patrouille Suisse
- PC-7 Team
