= Swissint =

Swiss Armed Forces International Command
- Insignia of Swissint
- Active: 1953–present
- Country: Switzerland
- Branch: Swiss Army
- Role: peace support operations
- Size: 280
- Headquarters: Oberdorf, Nidwalden
- Website: https://www.peace-support.ch/en/

Commanders
- Current commander: Colonel (GS) Alexander Furer

SWISSINT (acronym for Swiss Armed Forces International Command) is the center of the Swiss Armed Forces for foreign missions. The competence center is located in Oberdorf at Stans, Canton of Nidwalden.

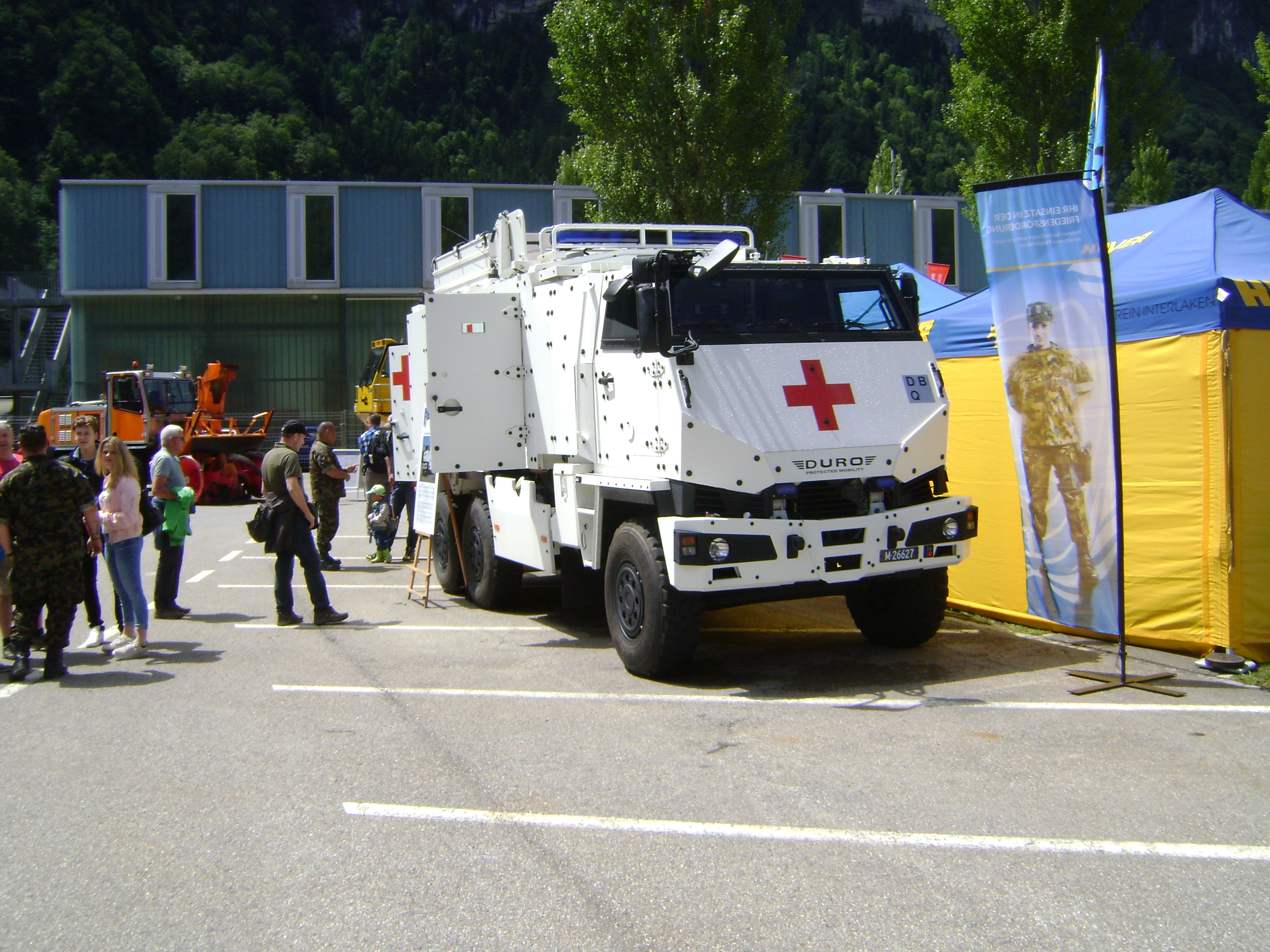
MOWAG Duro IIIP Ambulance from theSwissint

== Tasks ==
International peace support is one of the three tasks of the Swiss Armed Forces laid down in the Swiss Constitution and the Swiss Armed Forces Act. SWISSINT is responsible for the conduct of peace support operations. The implementation of the armed forces’ peace support task includes recruitment and HR management, logistics, financial planning and management, mission-specific training, national command and control during operations, evaluation and PR work for Swiss military contingents and individuals engaged in peace support missions abroad.

== Operations ==
With some 280 officers, NCOs, soldiers and civilians SWISSINT is in charge of more than 18 missions on four continents. As assigned by the United Nations and the Organization for Security and Co-operation in Europe (OSCE) military observers, staff and liaison officers are on duty either as individuals or in small teams. SWISSINT is primarily linked to the mission in Kosovo that has been running since 1999, the so-called SWISSCOY.

== SWISSINT International Command ==
The centre of excellence SWISSINT is stationed in the Wil barracks at Stans-Oberdorf. SWISSINT answers directly to the Chief of the Armed Forces Operations Command and follows the political directives of Federal Council and Parliament as well as those of the Chief of the Armed Forces. Its current commander is Colonel General Staff Alexander Furer.

== Training ==
The centre of excellence in Stans-Oberdorf is assigned to the training centre which is also stationed at the armed forces training area in the Wil barracks in Stans-Oberdorf. The training centre is in charge of mission-specific training. All courses are devised accordingly and continuously adjusted to the current requirements and lessons learned from the operations. The range of courses is extensive and is devised to satisfy both national and international as well as civilian and military interests.

All members of the Army (AdA) who are deployed to peace support operations (PSO) obtain their training from SWISSINT.

NATO has certified the SWISSINT Training Centre as a partnership for peace training and education centre. It offers various national and international courses for both civilian and military participants. Its military observer course (SUNMOC) has also been certified by the UN. Serving as infrastructure are, among other things, the military training area in Stans-Oberdorf and camp SWISSINT, which provides accommodation for 180 persons in about 200 containers.

== Current missions ==
Currently, members of the Army (AdA) undergo training for the following missions:

- Mission in Kosovo (KFOR / Swisscoy)
- Mission in Korea (Neutral Nations Supervisory Commission NNSC) 2014-2024 10 years pledge (Intellectual Assistance)
- Training missions in support of the KAIPTC (Accra, Ghana) and the EMPABB (Bamako, Mali)
- Operation in Bosnia and Herzegovina (EUFOR)
- Operations in favor of humanitarian demining (UNMAS)
- Appearances as military experts on mission and staff officers
  - UNTSO
  - MONUSCO
  - MINUSMA
  - UNMISS
  - MINURSO
  - UNMOGIP

As of 2021/11/01
