= Johanna Hurni =

Swiss army officer (1933–2021)

- Born: Johanna Roesler; 1 December 1933; Bern, Switzerland
- Died: 6 March 2021 (aged 87)
- Allegiance: Switzerland
- Branch: Swiss Army
- Rank: Brigadier
- Commands: Women's Auxiliary Service (from 1977); Military Women's Service (1986–1988)

Johanna Hurni (née Roesler; 1 December 1933 – 6 March 2021) was a Swiss army officer who was the first commander of the Military Women's Service, holding the rank of brigadier from 1986 to 1988.

== Biography ==
Johanna Roesler was born on 1 December 1933 in Bern, the daughter of Immanuel Roesler, a military instruction officer, and Julie Biedermann. In 1963 she married Hans Hurni, a microbiologist from Ferenbalm. After obtaining a commercial diploma, she trained as a medical laboratory technician.

In the army's Women's Auxiliary Service (Frauenhilfsdienst, FHD), Hurni served as a medical driver and group leader, and from 1964 to 1976 as a column leader and instructor. She became head of the Women's Auxiliary Service in 1977, and in 1986 the first brigadier of the Military Women's Service (Militärischer Frauendienst, MFD), founded that year, a post she held until 1988.

== Bibliography ==
- H. Kett, ed., Die Frau in der Schweizer Armee von 1939 bis heute, 1990
