= Special Forces Command (Switzerland) =

- Badge
- Active: 2012–present
- Country: Switzerland
- Branch: Army
- Type: Special operations force
- Size: 2,445
- Part of: Swiss Armed Forces
- Garrison/HQ: Monteceneri

The Special Forces Command (German: Kommando Spezialkräfte), (French: Commandement des Forces Spéciales), (Italian: Comando forze speciali) is an infantry corps of the Swiss Armed Forces specialised in rapid offensive operations, intel gathering and operations in urban areas, open fields and other difficult terrains, capable of acting on short notice. Grenadiers are subjected to considerable physical strain, applicants are required to be in excellent physical conditions, and recruits are chosen through a strict selection process.

The Grenadiers have been part of the Grenadier Command 1 since the "Army XXI" reform in late 2004, before which Grenadier units were integrated in other regiments. Grenadier Command 1, subordinated to the "Reconnaissance Formations of the Armed Forces and Grenadiers", is headquartered in Rivera. The Grenadiers' motto, shared with many other military institutions, is "Semper Fidelis".

== History ==
Soldiers denominated "grenadiers" have long been part of Switzerland's military tradition: even before the 19th century, grenadiers served as part of the cantonal contingents of the Swiss Confederacy. Modern Grenadiers were formed in the early 1940s, originating from the "Infantry Pioneers" trained by Chief instructor Matthias Brunner, the commander of a riflemen company who developed a close combat technique in the shooting schools of Walenstadt. This company, made up of volunteers, faced a stricter and more intensive training than other infantry companies.

In 1943, General Henri Guisan, convinced of the necessity of shock troops specially trained for close combat, decided to form a similar company in each of the 37 infantry regiments of the army. In the same year, the designation of "Grenadiers" replaced that of "Pioneers", marking the birth of the corps. Also in 1943, the first recruit school of Grenadiers were held in Locarno and Solduno. After the war, the makeshift training grounds were relocated twice, first to Losone, but after complains about having a military installation in a touristic area they were moved again to Isone, where they remain to this day.

In 1968, to answer the necessity of a specific training for combat and deployment in difficult terrains, units of Mountain Grenadiers were created. In 1970 Airborne Grenadiers, while subordinated to aviation troops, were first trained in the Grenadier recruit school. In 1971, companies of motorised Grenadiers were created. In the 1970s, the guerrilla tactics first introduced in 1943 were resumed and adapted with the name of "hunting war" (German: Jagdkrieg). The Army XXI reform of 2004 reassembled all Grenadier formations of the previous "Army 95" model in the Grenadier Command 1.

== Structure ==
The Special Forces Command is an infantry formation of about 3,000 soldiers and consists of the following units:

Badge	Unit	Place	Subunites
	Special Forces Command Staff Battalion	Monteceneri	Staff Company; Security Company; CSS Company; Grenadier Support Company
	Special Forces Training Centre	Isone	
	Army Reconnaissance Detachment 10 (Professional Unit)	Monteceneri	
	Military Police Special Detachment (Professional Unit)	Worblaufen	
	Parachute Reconnaissance Company 17 (Militia Unit)	Isone	Command Staff Platoon; 6 × Parachute Reconnaissance Patrols
	Grenadier Battalion 20 (Militia Unit)	Isone	Grenadier Staff Company; 3 × Grenadier Assault Companies; Grenadier Reconnaissance Company; Grenadier Support Company
	Grenadier Battalion 30 (Militia Unit)	Isone	Grenadier Staff Company; 3 × Grenadier Assault Companies; Grenadier Reconnaissance Company; Grenadier Support Company

== Training ==
The recruitment process of Grenadier units takes place one year before recruit school, and generally matches the ones of other corps, with the exception that one must volunteer to become a Grenadier.

Those interested and recruited as Grenadiers are subjected to an additional assessment program which takes place in the Special Force Training Center and serves as a selection to make recruits become aware of the reality of undergoing the course of the Special Force Training Center.

This additional assessment includes multiple physical tests as well as a comprehensive medical and psychological tests.

Recruit school, extending over a period of 23 weeks, is very demanding, both physically and psychologically. Those who successfully meet the performance during the various selection exams, mainly taking place until the eighth week during the so-called selection phase before the specialisation phase will be integrated into the Grenadier Battalions as a Grenadier earning the "Grenadier-Bombe" tab.

Those who do not meet the physical, psychological and social expectations usually remain in the Special Force Unit serving as a support staff. Training for NCOs and officers begins after the recruit school and candidates attend the Special Force Training Centres own NCO and officer school.

== Equipment ==
Additional Grenadier courses offered to recruits include basic training of selected firearms and survival techniques.

The Grenadiers will also be issued with plate carriers to replace their LBE gear.

Model	Swiss designation	Abbreviation of Swiss designation	Origin	Type	Usage
Glock 17	Pistol 12/15 Standard	N/A	Austria	Semi-automatic pistol	Recruits
Remington 870	Mehrzweckgewehr 91	MzGw 91	United States	Shotgun	Recruits
Sako TRG	Scharfschützengewehr 04	SSGw 04	Finland	Sniper rifle	Marksmen or snipers
PGM Hécate II	12.7 mm Präzisionsgewehr 04	12.7mm PGw 04	France	Sniper rifle	Marksmen or snipers
