= R-905 =

Microwave transmission station used in the Swiss Army

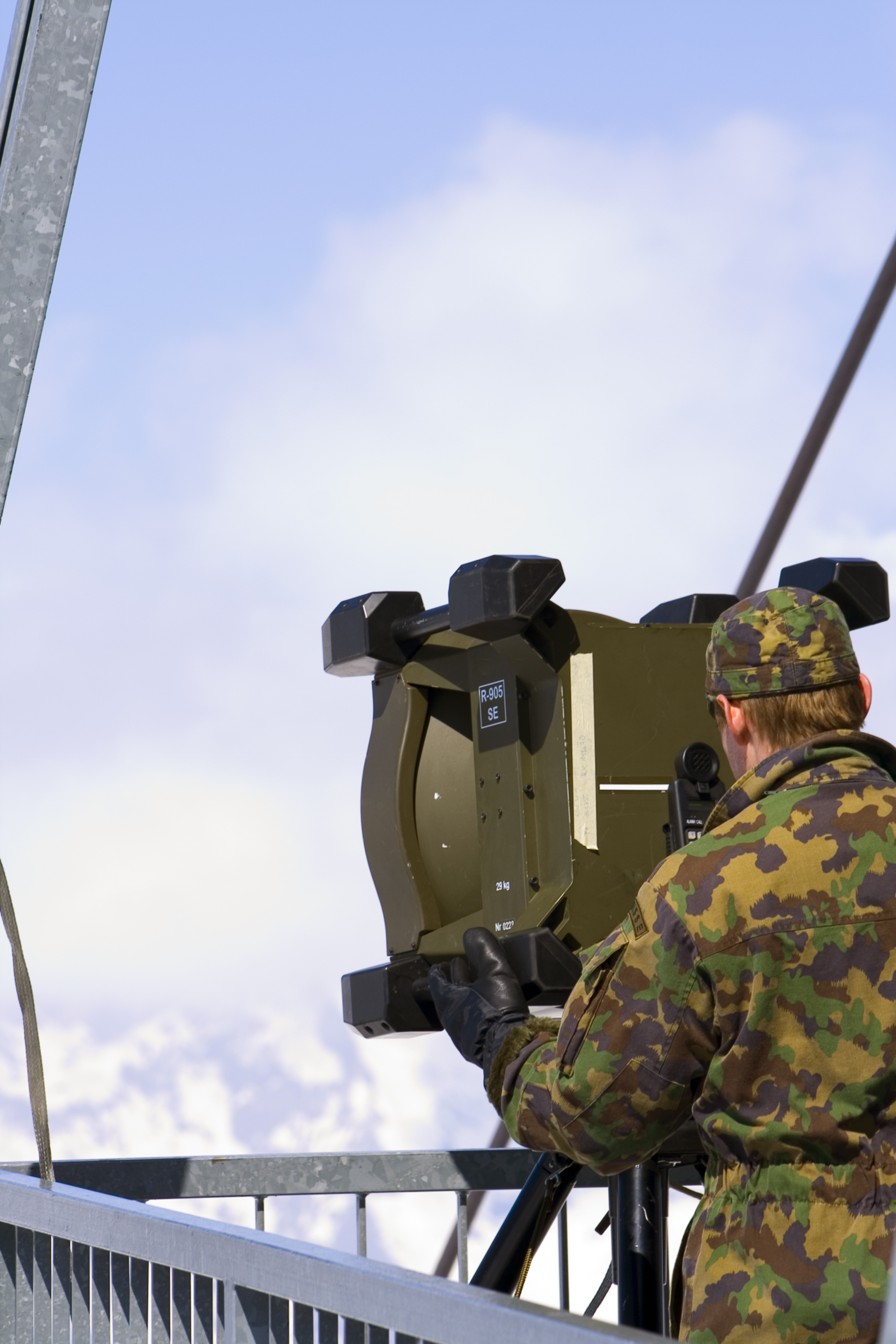
Microwave transmission station "Richtstrahlanlage R-905"

The R-905 is a microwave transmission station that is used in the Swiss Army. The directional station consists of a transmitting and receiving device (SE R-905) - in which the antenna reflector is also integrated - the operator terminal (BT) - a handset with keypad and LCD - and a supply equipment (SA 95/1). There is a 24V battery, a tripod with strap-down ropes and a camouflage net. All mentioned equipment and material adds up to about 230 kg but can be carried by troops separately, or can be loaded on to a mule.

Over a maximum of 4 km of optical fiber cable an "intermediary unit" (BSG 93) is connected to the SE. The link has an usable bitrate of either 2 or 8 Mbit/s.

The frequency range is from 14.64 to 17 GHz, with a frequency separation of at least 150 MHz between Transmit (TX) and Receive (RX) channels.

The maximum range is about 55 km. The total range can be increased by using up to two R-905 as relay stations. A relay station consists of two R-905s, which are interconnected with an optical fiber cable.

Over an unencrypted service channel which is multiplexed to the utility and remote control, conversations can be held with the other operators of the BSG93s and the SEs.
