= NM142 =

Norwegian military tank

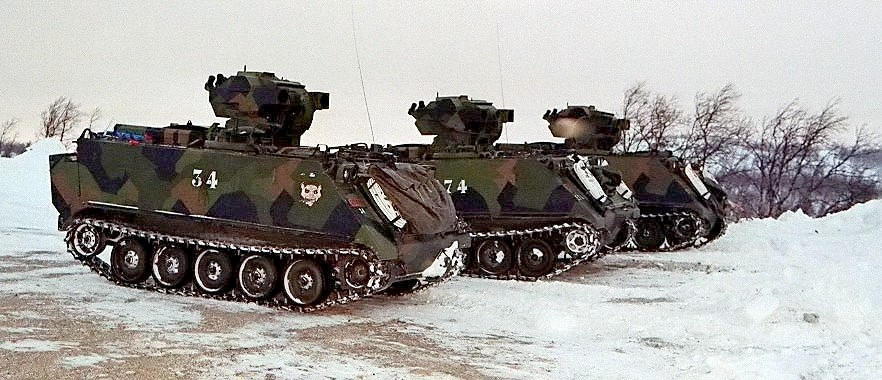
Three NM-142s in Northern Norway

The NM142 (Norwegian Model) is an anti-tank missile carrier variant of the American M113 Armored Personnel Carrier, which has been fitted with a TOW2 turret developed in Norway by Kværner Eureka.

== Armament ==
The NM-142 mounts a turret containing a TOW2 guided anti-tank missile system, with one launch tube on each side of the turret.

Additionally, mounted on the commander's hatch, there is an MG3 machine gun for use as secondary armament and in situations where the TOW2-system is unsuitable.

== Organization ==
The vehicle has a crew of four. The commander leads the crew, including designating targets, operating communication systems and navigating. The gunner is responsible for operating and maintaining the TOW2 weapon system. The loader assists the gunner, especially by reloading the launch tubes whenever necessary. Finally, the driver maneuvers the APC and is responsible for maintaining the engine, treads and other driving mechanisms.

Usually, a platoon consists of four NM-142s, led by a lieutenant (who also is the commander on one of the NM-142s). In some cases, three platoons are put together to constitute an anti-tank squadron, but individual platoons are also incorporated in various mechanized formations.

The Norwegian Army had approximately 100 NM-142s. By the end of the service life, all but 12 were withdrawn from service. These received some modifications and then named NM-142F1. As of 2021, all NM142 and NM142Fs have been withdrawn from active service.

== Turret ==
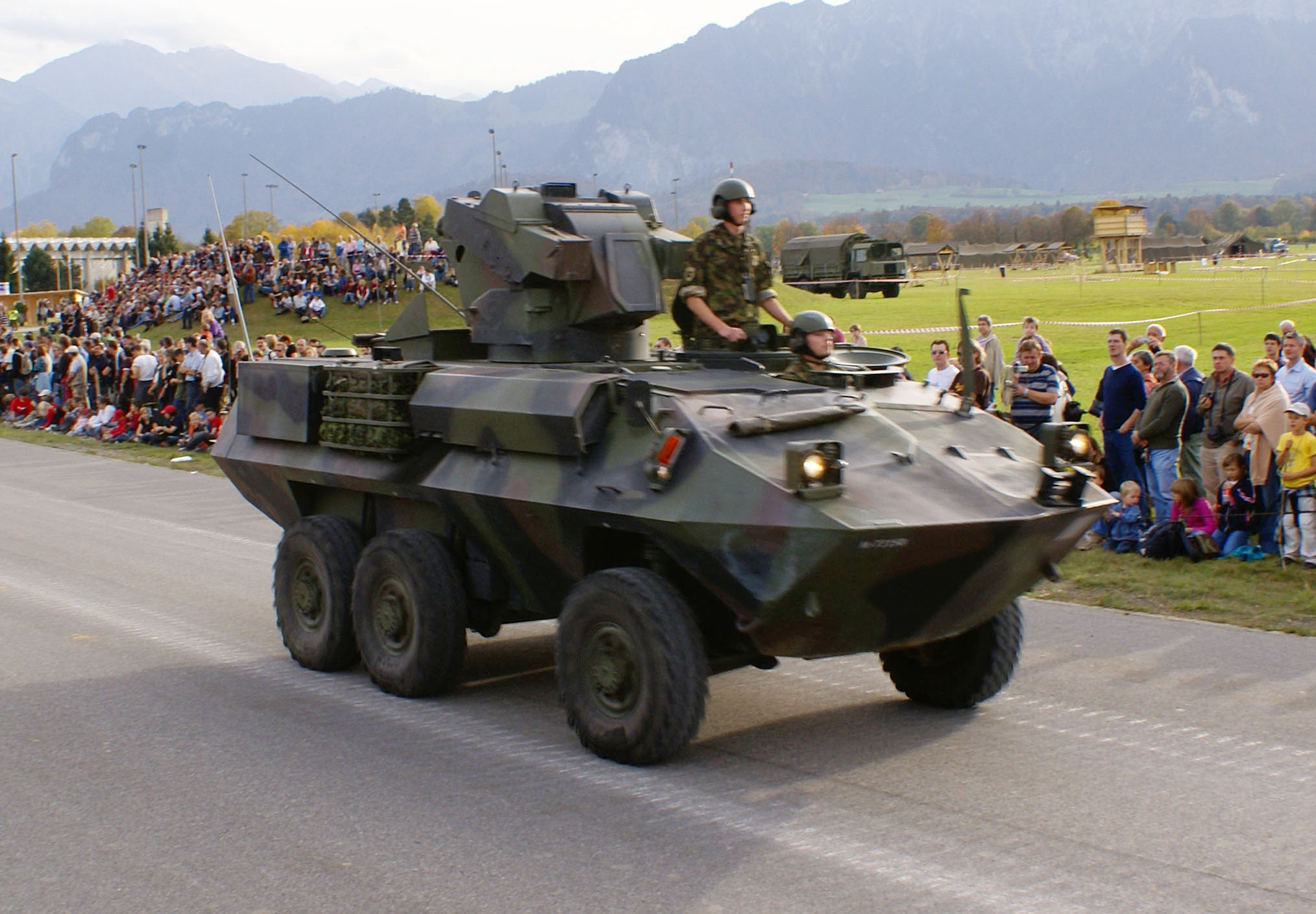
Swiss Army Piranha with a NM142 turret

Other nations have made variants using the same turret on other vehicles.

- Canada : M113 (TOW)
- Turkey: FNSS ACV-15 (ACV-ATV)
- Switzerland: Mowag Piranha IB 6×6 (Panzerjäger 90)

== See also ==
- M901 ITV, a similar American M113 variant
