= Army Reconnaissance Detachment 10 =

- Active: 2003–present
- Country: Switzerland
- Branch: Swiss Army
- Type: Special forces
- Role: Special reconnaissance Direct action
- Size: 30 (2003); 91 (2011); 80 (Current)
- Part of: Special Forces Command (Switzerland)

The Army Reconnaissance Detachment 10 (German: Armee-Aufklärungsdetachement 10, French: Détachement de reconnaissance de l'armée 10, Italian: Distaccamento d'esplorazione dell'esercito 10) is a special forces unit of the Swiss Army responsible for conducting counter-terrorist activities in Switzerland and abroad.

The ARD 10 is one of two special operations units of Switzerland. The other, the "MP Spez Det." or "Special Detachment of the Military Police", focuses primarily on domestic issues.

== History ==
As part of the Army XXI reforms, a report on October 24, 2001 to the Federal Assembly of Switzerland called for the formation of a special forces–trained unit that would be able to conduct counter-terrorist-type actions in the Swiss Army to protect Swiss nationals and soldiers living abroad.

In 2003, the unit was created with Major Daniel Stoll as the unit's first commanding officer. 30 soldiers with special forces training formed the nucleus of the unit, with its internal structure based on the Special Air Service.

In 2007, ARD 10 commandos joined in Exercise Cold Response 2007. The unit had been unveiled to the public during Army Day 2007 in Lugano from November 20 to November 25, 2007.

Critics had blasted the creation of the ARD 10, saying that that unit might conduct anti-terrorist missions that may put civilians in harm's way contrary to their mission.

The Zeit-Fragen, a weekly newspaper, also claimed that the ARD 10 would be a blow to Swiss neutrality, saying that crisis situations involving Swiss nationals are always solved through negotiations.

By 2011, the unit has 91 soldiers in active duty. Forty operators currently serve in the ranks of ARD 10.

== Unit tasks ==
The ARD 10 has certain tasks to fulfill as part of their mandate:

1. Procurement of key facilities
2. Protection of Swiss nationals, troop and facilities if endangered
3. Securing Swiss nationals from crisis areas
4. Direct Action
5. Special Reconnaissance

== Requirements ==
Among the minimal qualification requirements for potential candidates in 18 weeks, these include:

1. 50 press-ups
2. 60 sit-ups
3. 10 chin-ups
4. 5 km cross-country run in under 24 minutes
5. 8 km walk in full combat gear (15 kg pack) in less than 58 minutes
6. 25 km walk in full combat gear (25 kg pack) in less than 3.5 hours
7. 300 m swim in under 10 minutes

Other potential requirements include the following:

1. Good command of the English language
2. Good command of another language aside from English
3. Leadership skills

Candidates who must wear eyeglasses must have a visual acuity of at least 0.80 in order to be accepted.

The Swiss Army does not institute an age limit for soldiers who wish to join the ARD 10.

== Equipment ==
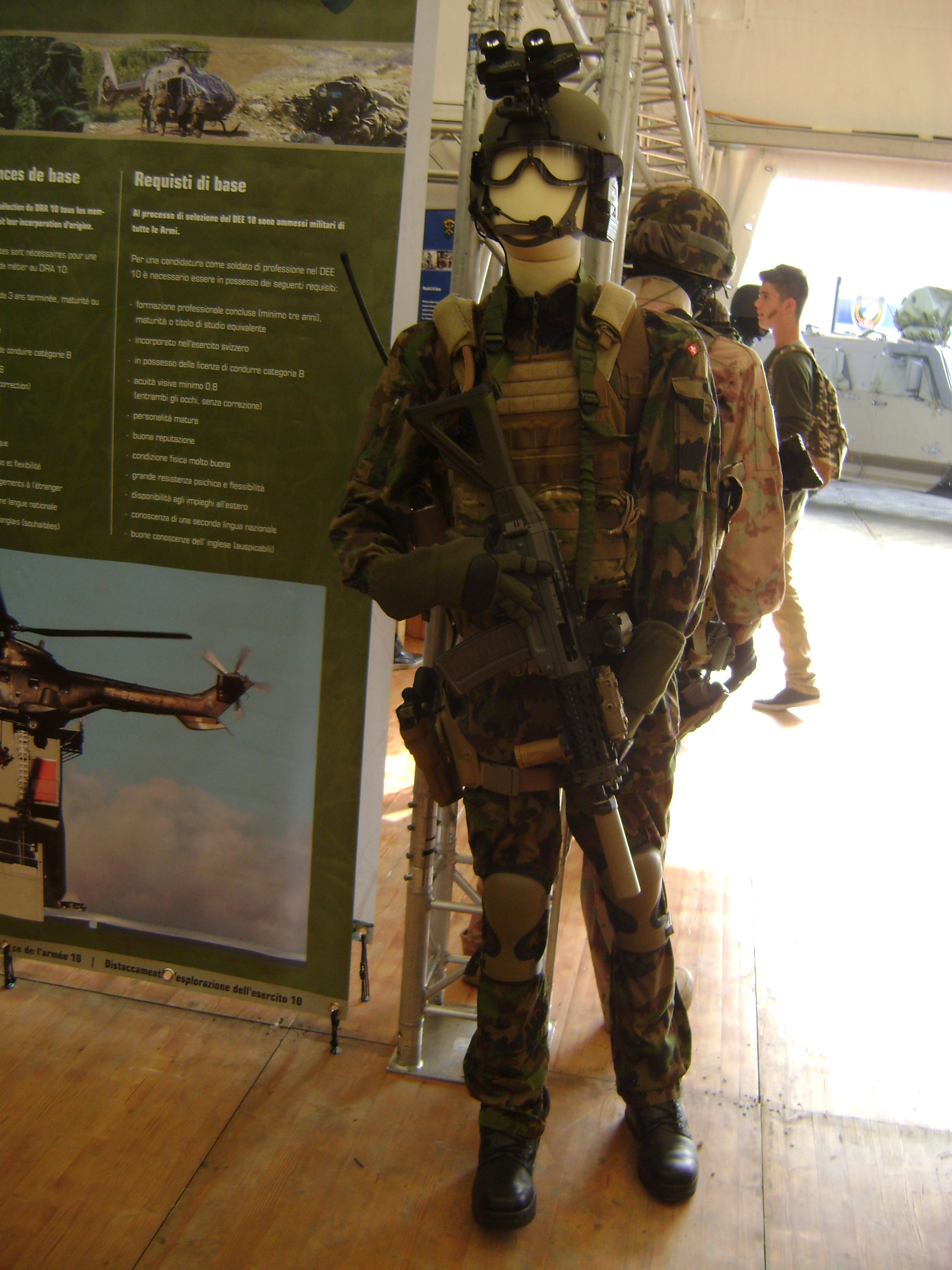
Model of an ARD-10 commando with issued equipment during an exhibition.

ARD 10 operators' equipment consists of knee protectors, kevlar helmets and anti-shrapnel vests.

The ARD's main light infantry vehicle is the AGF. The full cost of maintaining the ARD-DDR-DEE in 2011 was approximately 16 million francs.

Model	Swiss designation	Abbreviation of Swiss designation	Origin	Type	References
Glock 17T	N/A	N/A	Austria	Training pistol	
Glock 26T	N/A	N/A	Austria	Training pistol	
Glock 17	Pistol 12/15 Standard	N/A	Austria	Semi-automatic pistol	
Glock 26	Pistol 12 Kurz	N/A	Austria	Semi-automatic pistol	
SIG Pro	Pistol 03	N/A	Switzerland	Semi-automatic pistol	
Heckler & Koch MP5SD3	Maschinenpistole	N/A	Germany	Submachine gun	
SIG SG 553	Sturmgewehr 07	Stgw 07	Switzerland	Assault rifle	
Sako TRG	Scharfschützengewehr 04	SSGw 04	Finland	Sniper rifle	

== Training ==
Potential candidates must attend the full 18 months, of special forces training after completing their compulsory service with the Swiss Army, with 6 months dedicated to basic training and followed by 40 weeks of infiltration technique training.

Candidates will be assessed prior to training their physical and mental state, as well as their health if they are fit to be qualified as ARD 10 soldiers. Candidates must also have clean records from their time after attending compulsory service.

Upon completion of training, all ARD 10 soldiers are required to be on standby in case of deployment.

Over 300 soldiers apply for a position in the ARD 10, but only 10 prospective soldiers are chosen for training as ARD 10 operators. Both male and female candidates can apply.

Among the specialist courses taught to all prospective ARD 10 operators include the following:

- Mountain Specialist
- Amphibious Specialist
- Parachute Specialist
- Motorized Specialist

=== Foreign training ===
It is suggested that the first batch of ARD 10 operators had been given training by foreign special forces instructors.

They include instructors from the United States Navy SEALs, US Special Forces, and the Special Air Service.

== Known operations ==
In 2020, it was reported that the ARD10 was supposed to be assigned to protect the Swiss Agency for Development and Cooperation office in Kabul.

In August 2021, ARD10 teams were deployed to Kabul to assist in evacuating Swiss/foreign nationals evacuating after the Taliban captured Kabul.

In the Russian-Ukrainian war, ARD10 operators helped evacuate Swiss diplomatic staff from Kyiv in February 2022 and provided close protection for Swiss president Ignazio Cassis when he visited President Zelensky in October 2022.

The ARD10 was deployed to Tel Aviv in June 2025, following the outbreak of the Twelve-Day War, in order to ensure the protection of the Swiss embassy and its staff.

== Work conditions ==
All ARD 10 soldiers are allowed a maximum of 20 days off from active service with the unit, as well as additional 5 days if required.

Accommodations in terms of living quarters and food are taken care of by the unit itself without having the individual soldier pay. ARD 10 soldiers stay in the unit for 5 years. Efforts are underway to raise it up to 10 years of service.

The soldiers are paid according to their marital status and economic standing. Extra pay ranges from 397 to 5,156 Swiss francs. Others are paid 4,111 Swiss francs if they have children with extra pay that includes 2,654 Swiss francs. ARD 10 soldiers are also paid if they are deployed abroad, depending on the nature of their mission. Soldiers are paid additionally 6.17 Swiss francs per hour for participating in night duties.

All ARD 10 soldiers have insurance as provided by the Swiss military.

In addition, ARD 10 soldiers are to reimbursed according to federal law with an accommodation maximum of 130 Swiss francs.

== Criticisms ==
=== Deployment to Somalia ===
There has been calls on the Swiss government to deploy ARD 10 operators to combat Somali pirates with no consensus in Parliament, due to an evenly divided vote against it.

The planned mission called for 30 ARD 10 operators to be deployed with a spokesperson for the Swiss Army saying that the ARD 10 is ready to be deployed if given the order.

An article criticized the planned mission to Somalia, questioning why ARD 10 operators should shoot at pirates when they are on anti-piracy operations, since most pirates are ex-fishermen and criminals.

Furthermore, an article from the Berner Zeitung insists that the ARD 10 deployment is not the solution, but calls for political solutions.

=== Operation SAKR ===
ARD 10 operators were supposed to be covertly deployed into Libya to rescue two hostages held by Gaddafi due to the arrest of his son in Switzerland under "Operation SAKR".

Instead, the hostages were released after negotiations between Libya and Switzerland, with the details of the rescue operations leaked to the press.

The ARD10 was criticized for being "dangerous" when Swiss media leaked out plans to rescue Swiss nationals in Libya on June 28, 2010. In addition, it is reported that only 40 operators are currently active instead of the initially planned 90.

According to Albert Stahel of Zurich University’s Institute for Strategic Studies, an umbrella of the Swiss military's various special forces units should be created, as Switzerland does not have enough resources to strategically transport ARD 10 operators to various places around the globe.
