= Swisscoy =

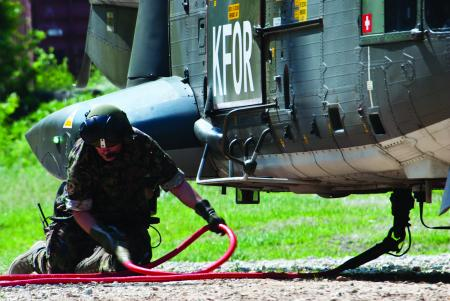
Super Puma of the Swiss Air Force in Kosovo (2011)

Swisscoy (short for Swiss Company) is a unit of the Swiss Armed Forces. Consisting of a contingent of 195 troops at most, the unit is deployed in Kosovo as part of the NATO-led KFOR international peacekeeping force. Swisscoy moved into Kosovo in October 1999 and will remain there until at least the end of 2029.

== Political foundations ==
Peace support within an international context is one of the three tasks of the Swiss Armed Forces. This mission is laid down in the Swiss Federal Constitution and the Swiss Military Act. Apart from peace support, the three tasks of the Swiss Armed Forces include defence and subsidiary support of the civilian authorities. Although Switzerland is not a member of the NATO alliance, the Swiss Armed Forces are participating with SWISSCOY (acronym for Swiss Company) in the international peace support mission of the Kosovo Force (KFOR) in Kosovo. This mission is carried out within the context of the military cooperation programme Partnership for Peace between NATO and various non-member states. SWISSCOY's mission is based on the decision of the Federal Council of 23 June 1999 to participate military in KFOR – on the basis of UN Resolution 1244. SWISSCOY's mandate is always given for three years. At the end of 2013, the Federal Council recommended extending the mandate for a further three years (until the end of 2017). In the spring of 2014, Parliament passed renewed extension of the mandate until the end of 2017. Parliament has the power to decide on the coming three years, i.e. whether Swiss engagement is to continue. The mission of SWISSCOY is compatible with neutrality for three reasons: Firstly, the KFOR mission is based on the agreement of both conflicting parties. Secondly, Switzerland is exclusively engaged in peace support, participation in combat activity for peace enforcement is and continues to be excluded. And thirdly, the service of Swiss military personnel in the peace support operation is voluntary. The Swiss contingent is relieved of service in a bi-annual rhythm.

== Changed requirements ==
The positive developments in Kosovo's security situation have led to changes in Kosovo's structure and to a step-by-step reduction in the number of security elements. While emergency aid and rebuilding after the war still stood to the fore at the beginning of the mission, the focus today is on safeguarding the development of the country. In order to do justice to the different demands, SWISSCOY fulfils other tasks today than at the beginning of the mission. At the start of the KFOR mission SWISSCOY's engagement in Kosovo included infantry units. This is no longer the case today. SWISSCOY's strengths currently relate primarily to transport services, expert engineering work, EOD (explosive ordnance disposal), air transport and LMT (liaison and monitoring teams).

== JRD-N and LMT ==
Per 1 January 2012, a Swiss colonel assumed command of Joint Regional Detachment North (JRD-N) and reports directly to the commander of KFOR. Since April 2010, some of SWISSCOY consists of LMTs (Liaison and Monitoring Teams). The LMTs are the eyes and ears of KFOR. By conversing daily with the local population, soldiers hear what concerns the people on the spot have. The task of the LMTs consists in collecting information by talking to inhabitants and key figures (e.g. political representatives) and passing it on via JRD to the KFOR commander who, among other things, uses these reports to assess the situation and as a basis for operational decisions. A local interpreter always accompanies the LMTs in their daily work. For KFOR Switzerland provides a total of four LMTs in various regions.

== Overview ==
SWISSCOY fulfils multinational and national tasks in accordance with its mandate. The major part of SWISSCOY carries out multinational services as listed below and is assigned to cooperate operationally with other organisational units of KFOR for this purpose:

- transport platoon with special vehicles
- engineer platoon, in charge of general construction projects for KFOR
- liaison and monitoring teams (LMTs) at four locations
- staff and liaison officers at KFOR HQ and Joint Regional Detachment levels
- international military police (IMP)
- explosive ordnance disposal team (EOD)
- medical team
- air transport detachment with Cougar helicopters

Together with the Austrian transport platoon, the Swiss transport platoon forms a joint transport company, the ‘transport coy’. Both the transport coy and the engineer platoon are assigned to KFOR's Joint Logistic Support Group (JLSG). The other section of SWISSCOY accomplishes missions that are both purely national and bi-national in cooperation with partner countries. These include the NCC staff (located in Pristina) and the National Support Element (NSE) located in Prizren. A functioning NSE is required to enable the services of the operational SWISSCOY elements. These include maintenance, which ensures that SWISSCOY always remains mobile. The warehouse that manages the various logistic issues is also part of SWISSCOY operations. Finally, SWISSCOY runs two catering institutions (the ‘Swiss Chalet’ at the Prizren field camp and the Swiss House in the Swiss compound of the camp Film City in Pristina) that are open to the staff of all KFOR participating countries

== Stationing and locations ==
Since the disbandment of Camp Casablanca in Suva Reka that was jointly run with the Austrians, SWISSCOY locations are distributed throughout Kosovo. Depending on their function, SWISSCOY members are stationed at five different locations. The NCC (National Contingent Commander) staff, the military police, the EOD team, the SWIC (Swiss Intelligence Cell) as well as sections of the signal and the medical teams are stationed at KFOR headquarters in Pristina (camp Film City). Together with Austrian KFOR staff the Swiss medics, consisting of several nurses and a doctor, are in charge of the joint medical centre (first port of call for medical patients, comparable with the well equipped surgery of a Swiss general practitioner) in the Swiss compound of headquarters. The National Support Element (NSE), the transport platoon, the engineer platoon as well as sections of the signal and the medical teams who serve in the mission hospital are stationed at the field camp in Prizren. JRD-N receives its assignments from camp Novo Selo, south of Mitrovica. The Swiss air transport detachment is stationed at camp Bondsteel in the south-east of Kosovo. Two Swiss LMTs are located in the south and live in private houses in Malishevo and Prizren. Two further LMTs are stationed in the north of Kosovo in camp Novo Selo, south of Mitrovica and operate in various allocated areas of responsibility. In the summer of 2014, the field house was opened in Mitrovica. Since then, the LMT of Mitrovica is living and working in the midst of the local population.

== Training and preparing for operations ==
Recruitment, operation specific training and equipment of Swiss forces abroad are provided for by the Swiss Armed Forces International Command SWISSINT in Stans-Oberdorf. The centre of excellence in Stans is assigned to the training centre which is also located at the Wil military training area at Stans and in charge of operation specific training. All courses are accordingly devised and continuously adjusted to the requirements and lessons learned from the operations. The range of courses is extensive and is devised to satisfy both national and international as well as civilian and military interests. NATO has certified the Swissint training centre as a partnership for peace training and education centre. It offers various national and international courses for both civilian and military participants. Our military observer course (SUNMOC) has also been certified by the UN. Among other things, the military training area in Stans-Oberdorf and camp Swissint, which provides accommodation for 180 persons in about 200 containers.

== Armament ==
For their own protection SWISSCOY personnel are equipped with pistol and/or assault rifle as well as pepper spray in the Kosovo area of operations.
