= Mowag Eagle =

MOWAG Eagle V
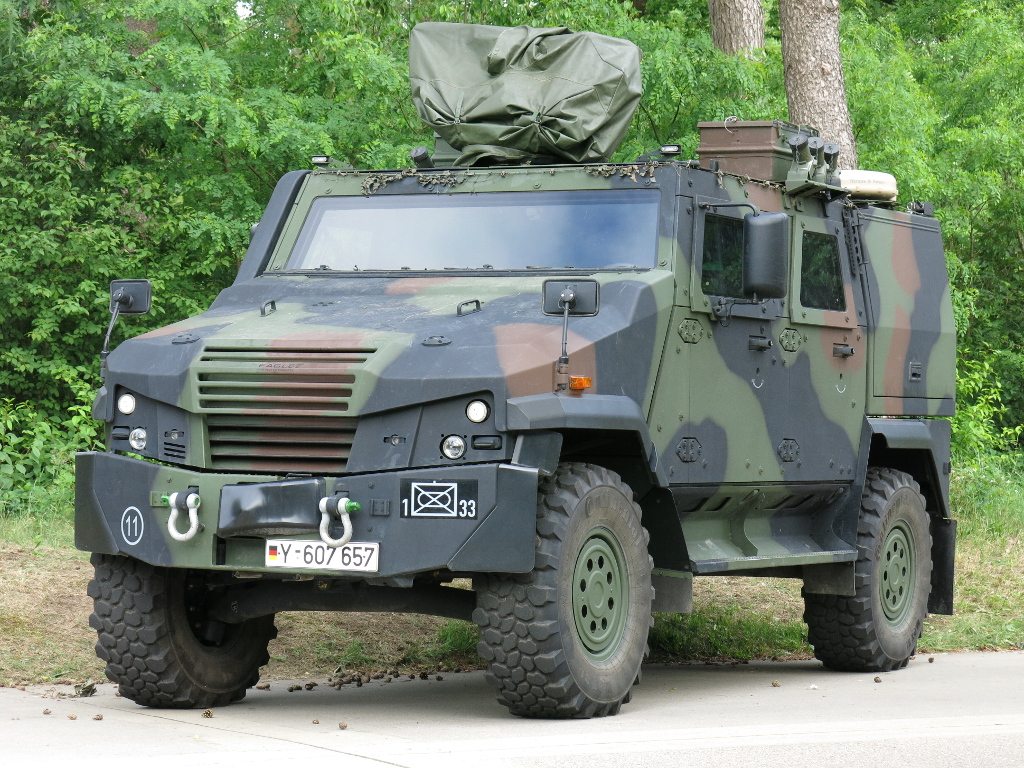
- MOWAG Eagle V of the German Army
- Type: AFV (Eagle I, II, IV, V), RECCE (Eagle I, II, IV, V), IMV (Eagle IV and V), C2 (Eagle III, IV, V), MRAP (Eagle IV, V), Ambulance (Eagle IV and V)
- Place of origin: Switzerland

Service history
- Used by: Denmark, Germany, Luxembourg, Switzerland, Ukraine (unauthorised export)
- Wars: War in Afghanistan; MINUSMA; Kosovo Force; Russian invasion of Ukraine

Production history
- Manufacturer: 1993–1999: Mowag; 1999–2004: Mowag under GM Canada; 2004–2026: GDELS Mowag GmbH; 2026–present: GDELS Mowag GmbH and GDELS Deutschland GmbH
- Developed from: Eagle I from Humvee; Eagle II and III from Humvee ECV; Eagle IV from Duro II 4×4; Eagle V 4×4 / 6×6 from Duro IIIP
- Unit cost: USD $886,813 in 2020
- Produced: 1993–present
- Variants: Eagle I, II, III, IV, V

The Mowag Eagle is a series of wheeled armoured vehicle designed by Mowag, a Swiss company now owned by GDELS (General Dynamics European Land Systems).

== Models ==
=== Eagle I ===
The original Eagle used the chassis and running gear of the Humvee. It was developed for the needs of the Swiss Army for an armoured reconnaissance vehicle. The Danish Army also purchased the Eagle I, and used it in the 2003 war in Iraq, as well as the ISAF mission in Afghanistan.

Its combat weight reaches 4,800 kg including 1,000 of payload and meeting STANAG 4569 level I protection and STANAG 4569 Level I mine protection.

=== Eagle II ===
The Eagle II was developed to take into account the changes wanted by the Swiss Army for the second batch of armoured reconnaissance vehicle it needed. It uses a different chassis and running gear, that of the Humvee ECV, but all the equipment is the same as for the Swiss Eagle I.

Its combat weight reaches 5,500 kg including 1,400 of payload and meeting STANAG 4569 level I protection and STANAG 4569 Level I mine protection.

=== Eagle III ===
The Eagle III also uses the chassis and running gear of the Humvee ECV. The Swiss Army was looking for a mobile artillery observer vehicle. The difference is in the cabin that is designed to offer a good visibility to the artillery observers. The electronic equipment was also adapted to the mission, using the INTAFF commanding system of the Swiss Army artillery, and an observation mast (containing CCD-TV, IR, and a laser range finder).

Its combat weight reaches 8,400 kg including 1,650 of payload and meeting STANAG 4569 level I protection and STANAG 4569 Level I mine protection.

=== Eagle IV ===
The Eagle IV is based on the chassis of the Mowag Duro IIIP. It was introduced commercially in November 2003, and received its IOC (initial operational capability) in 2004 with the Danish Army. It was later purchased by the German Army as one of its main armoured mobility vehicle.

- The armoured cabin has a protection STANAG 4569 level III
- The anti-mine protection reaches the STANAG 4569 Level IIa standard

Two Eagle IV in combat configurations are transportable by the C-130 Hercules.

Its combat weight reaches 7,600 kg including 2,400 of payload and high level protection meeting STANAG 4569 level III protection and STANAG 4569 Level IIa mine protection (6 kg TNT under each wheel). The vehicle's width is smaller than the Humvee, which allows two combat ready Eagle IVs to be transported in a C-130 without special preparations. Up to 2023, it is the most successful variant commercially (587 vehicles).

=== Eagle V ===
The Eagle V is the current version. There are two main variants, a 4×4 and a 6×6. The Eagle V 4×4 has 80% of its parts in common with the Eagle IV, which was a requirement of the German Army.

=== Specifications ===
Parameters	Eagle I	Eagle II	Eagle III	Eagle IV	Eagle V 4×4	Eagle V 6×6
	Base chassis					
Chassis based on	Humvee	Humvee ECV	Humvee ECV	Mowag Duro 2 4×4	Mowag Duro 3 4×4 / Mowag Eagle IV	Mowag Duro 3 6×6
	Dimensions					
Internal volume	–	–	–	–	≤ 13.5 m^{3} (480 ft^{3})	≤ 16.0 m^{3} (570 ft^{3})
Length	4.90 m (16.1 ft)	4.90 m (16.1 ft)	4.90 m (16.1 ft)	5.39 to 5.54 m (17.7 to 18.2 ft)	5.40 m (17.7 ft)	6.99 m (22.9 ft)
Height	1.75 m (5.7 ft)	1.75 m (5.7 ft)	2.47 m (8.1 ft)	2.10 m (6.9 ft)	2.32 m (7.6 ft)	2.32 m (7.6 ft)
Width (wo mirror)	2.27 m (7.4 ft)	2.27 m (7.4 ft)	2.27 m (7.4 ft)	2.30 m (7.5 ft)	2.20 m (7.2 ft)	2.20 m (7.2 ft)
Wheelbase	3.30 m (10.8 ft)	3.30 m (10.8 ft)	3.30 m (10.8 ft)	3.86 m (12.7 ft)	3.53 m (11.6 ft)	3.83 m (12.6 ft) / 1.30 m (4.3 ft)
	Mass					
Ready for operation	4.5 t (9,900 lb)	4.7 t (10,000 lb)	5.3 t (12,000 lb)	6.7 to 7.4 t (15,000 to 16,000 lb)	≥ 7.0 t (15,400 lb)	≥ 7.7 t (17,000 lb)
Payload	0.45 t (990 lb)	0.8 t (1,800 lb)	0.5 t (1,100 lb)	1.4 to 2.1 t (3,100 to 4,600 lb)	≤ 3.5 t (7,700 lb)	≤ 7.3 t (16,000 lb)
GVM (max)	4.95 t (10,900 lb)	5.5 t (12,000 lb)	5.8 t (13,000 lb)	≤ 9.5 t (21,000 lb)	≤ 11.5 t (25,000 lb)	≤ 17.0 t (37,500 lb)
Towing capacity	–	–	–	3.5 t (7,700 lb)	3.5 t (7,700 lb)	3.5 t (7,700 lb)
	Power train					
Engine	GM / Detroit V8 6.5l N/A (L57)(V8, turbo-diesel engine)	GM / Detroit V8 6.5l N/A (L65)	GM / Detroit V8 6.5l N/A (L65)	Cummins ISB 250 5.9 E3(inline-six, turbo-diesel engine)	Cummins ISB 6.7 E3 (inline-six, turbo-diesel engine)	Cummins ISB 6.7 E3 (inline-six, turbo-diesel engine)
Engine power	159 hp (119 kW)	190 hp (140 kW)	190 hp (140 kW)	247 hp (184 kW)	240 to 285 hp (179 to 213 kW)	285 to 360 hp (213 to 268 kW)
Power / mass ratio	32.1 hp/t (23.9 kW/t) (at GVW)	34.5 hp/t (25.7 kW/t) (at GVW)	32.8 hp/t (24.5 kW/t) (at GVW)	26.0 hp/t (19.4 kW/t) (at GVW)	20.9 to 24.8 hp/t (15.6 to 18.5 kW/t) (at GVW)	16.8 to 21.2 hp/t (12.5 to 15.8 kW/t) (at GVW)
Torque	393 N⋅m (290 lb⋅ft)	515 N⋅m (380 lb⋅ft)	515 N⋅m (380 lb⋅ft)	750 N⋅m (550 lb⋅ft)	925 to 970 N⋅m (682 to 715 lb⋅ft)	970 to 1,100 N⋅m (720 to 810 lb⋅ft)
Driveline	Permanent 4×4	Permanent 4×4	Permanent 4×4	Permanent 4×4	Permanent 4×4	Permanent 6×6
Transmission	Hydramatic 4L80E (4-speed auto, 1 reverse)	Hydramatic 4L80E (4-speed auto, 1 reverse)	Hydramatic 4L80E (4-speed auto, 1 reverse)	Allison 2500 SP 5 (5-speed auto, 1 reverse)	Allison 2500 SP 5 (5-speed auto, 1 reverse)	Allison 2500 SP 5 (5-speed auto, 1 reverse)
Transfer case	Low-high; New Venture Gear Type 242	Low-high; New Venture Gear Type 242	Low-high; New Venture Gear Type 242	Low-high; Mowag 2S 22	Low-high; Mowag 2S 22	Low-high; Mowag 2S 22
Differential	Torsen (self-locking)	Torsen (self-locking)	Torsen (self-locking)	Torsen (self-locking)	Torsen (self-locking)	Torsen (self-locking)
Suspension	Independent	Independent	Independent	Independent suspension with de Dion stabilizer	Independent suspension with de Dion stabilizer	Independent suspension with de Dion stabilizer
	Vehicle performances					
Max speed (road)	80 km/h (50 mph) (legal); 125 km/h (78 mph) (max)	80 km/h (50 mph) (legal); 120 km/h (75 mph) (max)	80 km/h (50 mph) (legal); 120 km/h (75 mph) (max)	≤ 110 km/h (68 mph)	≤ 110 km/h (68 mph)	≤ 110 km/h (68 mph)
Max speed (terrain)	–	–	–	≤ 55 km/h (34 mph)	≤ 55 km/h (34 mph)	≤ 55 km/h (34 mph)
Range on road	450 km (280 mi) (94.6 L (25.0 US gal))	400 to 600 km (250 to 370 mi) (94.6 L (25.0 US gal))	400 to 600 km (250 to 370 mi) (94.6 L (25.0 US gal))	700 km (430 mi) (180 L (48 US gal))	700 km (430 mi) (180 L (48 US gal))	700 km (430 mi) (200 L (53 US gal))
Slope (angle)	60% (31.0°)	60% (31.0°)	60% (31.0°)	60% (31.0°)	60% (31.0°)	60% (31.0°)
Side slope (angle)	40% (21.8°)	40% (21.8°)	40% (21.8°)	40% (21.8°)	40% (21.8°)	30% (16.7°)
Ground clearance	0.40 m (1.3 ft)	0.40 m (1.3 ft)	0.40 m (1.3 ft)	0.40 m (1.3 ft)	0.40 to 0.44 m (1.3 to 1.4 ft)	0.40 to 0.44 m (1.3 to 1.4 ft)
Trench	–	–	–	0.50 m (1.6 ft)	0.50 m (1.6 ft)	aaa
Vertical step	0.50 m (1.6 ft)	–	–	0.50 m (1.6 ft)	0.5 m (1.6 ft)	0.5 m (1.6 ft)
Fording depth	0.76 m (2.5 ft)	0.76 m (2.5 ft)	0.76 m (2.5 ft)	0.76 to 1.00 m (2.49 to 3.28 ft)	0.8 to 1.2 m (2.6 to 3.9 ft)	0.8 to 1.2 m (2.6 to 3.9 ft)
Turning circle diameter (wall to wall)	14.6 m (48 ft)	14.6 m (48 ft)	14.6 m (48 ft)	15.0 m (49.2 ft)	13.5 m (44 ft)	18.0 m (59.1 ft) (optional 3rd steering axle: 16.0 m (52.5 ft))
	Protection					
Ballistic protection	STANAG 4569 level 1			STANAG 4569 level 2 / (level 3 with optional add-on armour)		
Artillery protection	STANAG 4569 level 1			STANAG 4569 level 2		
Grenade / mine / IED protection	–			STANAG 4569 level 1 / (level 2a with optional add-on armour)	Double V-hull; STANAG 4569 level 2a	
Optional protections (non-ballistic)	–			Fire suppression / mine protection seat / NBC protection	Fire suppression / NBC protection	

=== Prototypes and known variants in development ===
==== Based on the Eagle IV ====
- GTV JLTV Eagle (General Tactical Vehicle JLTV): This prototype is based on the Eagle IV 4×4. GDLS offered this vehicle in the JLTV program that intended to replace the Humvee in the US Armed Forces. A RFP for the TD phase was released in February 2008; the proposals by the industry were received by April 2008. In October 2008, the Pentagon selected three of the other competitors for the EMD phase (Engineering and Manufacturing Development). Oshkosh won the competition with the L-ATV in August 2015. This vehicle never entered service.
- Eagle IV SOF: The Danish Forsvaret (special forces unit) modified an Eagle by removing the doors. It first appeared in 2008. An opening in the roof was made for access to the machine gun. some additional equipment were added, such as rolled camouflage nets that are there to quickly hide the vehicle and protect it from IR emissions. It was designed to replace the Humvee Jülkat.
- Penman Raptor II, a Scottish variant of a licensed Eagle IV.

==== Prototype based on the Eagle V 4×4 ====
- Eagle SOF (Special Operation Forces): This prototype was presented by GDELS Mowag at the armament fair Eurosatory 2022. The design is focused on providing a vehicle as robust, durable and mobile as possible. It has an open roof, and can be equipped with various modular kits of armament and protection.
- Denmark - Tank hunter killer: Integration of the STAVS Kongsberg Protector equipped with the Spike LR2 anti-tank guided missile. The first missile was shot in January 2026.

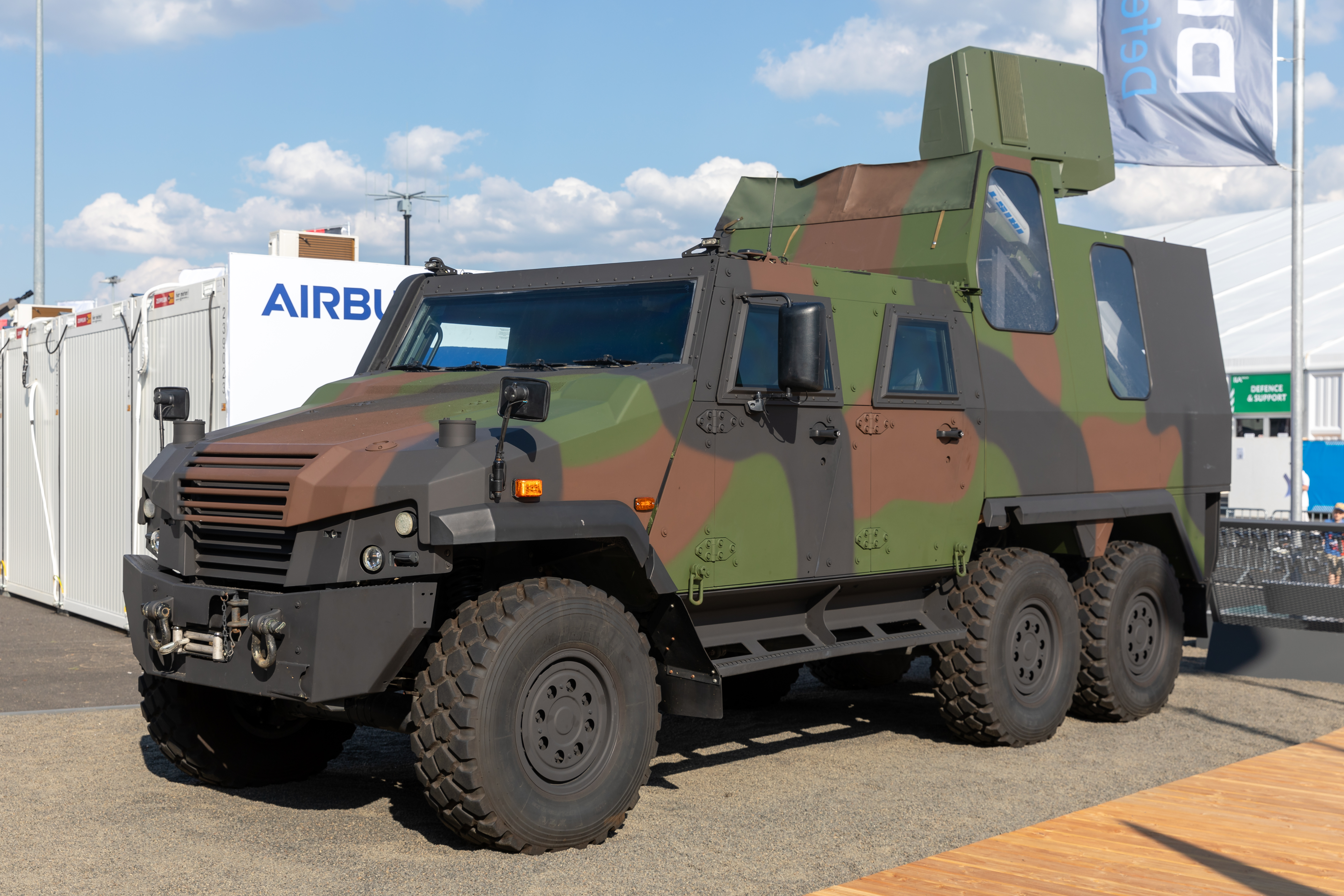
IRIS-T SLS Mk III

==== Prototype based on the Eagle V 6×6 ====
- Führungsfahrzeug Kat. 3: Mowag and the Swiss army are developing this command vehicle in order to replace the older M113A1 Kommandopanzer 63/07.
- IRIS-T SLS Mk III: Diehl Defence and Hensoldt presented a prototype for an air defence system based on the Eagle V 6×6 at DSEI 2021. It is one of the answer resulting from the NNbS working group on the short and very short air defence needs of the Bundeswehr. The IRIS-T SLS Mk III intends to be a short range defence system against targets such as helicopters, UAVs, aircraft and missiles. Although the missiles are installed in a slanted position, as they have a lock-on after launch capability, it can reach a target at 360°. The system is designed to engage targets in movement, with the goal of providing an air defence coverage to an assault force. It is a fully independent system that can be connected to a command-and-control system for air-defence.
  - 2 IRIS-T SLS missiles able to reach a target flying at 8 km of altitude, or at a maximum range of 12 km
  - Hensoldt supplies the Spexer lightweight, low power X-band radar system mounted on a mast extendable by 4.7m
  - identification friend-or-foe system
  - Command-and-Control system (C2) Integrated Battle Management Software by Airbus Defence
- Eagle V MUM-T: Vehicle presented at Eurosatory 2026, designed in collaboration with Alpha Robotics, the vehicle includes Wolf G1 UGV / Wolf C1 UGV land drones.

== Operators ==
=== Current operators ===
==== Summary ====
Operators	Eagle ordered (by variant)							Eagle delivered (by variant)							Retired	Losses (of the variant in service)	In service
Operators	I	II	III	IV	V (4×4)	V (6×6)	Total	I	II	III	IV	V (4×4)	V (6×6)	Total	Retired	Losses (of the variant in service)	In service
Switzerland	156	175	120	–	5	100	556	156	175	120	–	5	–	456	-156	-3	297
Denmark	36	–	–	90	93	–	219	36	–	–	90	93	–	219	-126	0	93
Germany	–	–	–	495	2,786	440	3,721	–	–	–	495	176	1	672	0	0	672
Luxembourg	–	–	–	–	80	4	84	–	–	–	–	2	1	3	0	0	3
TOTAL	192	175	120	585	2,964	544	4,580	192	175	120	585	276	2	1,350	-282	-3	1,065

Retired
Order in production

Official users Unofficial users

==== Eagle I ====
Ukraine (11 former Danish Spejdervogn M/95)
1 Eagle I was seen on Social Media on the 18th of March 2023 in the city of Avdiivka (near Donetsk). Following an investigation by the Swiss authorities, it was discovered that those Mowag Eagle were the former Danish ones that were sold in 2013 to FWW Fahrzeugwerke, a German company owned by GDELS.
FWW Fahrzeugwerk exported the Eagle to Ukraine with approval from the German government, but the sale violates the interdiction to export Swiss weapons to countries at war, and it was done so without the approval of the Swiss government.

==== Eagle II ====
Switzerland (175)
175 Aufklärungsfahrzeug 93/97 (light armoured reconnaissance vehicle).
Order in 1997, delivery in 1999 - 2001, equipped with a 7.5mm Pz Mg 51/71 machine gun and fitted with thermal imaging and radio equipment. All but 2 lost in accidents remain in service as of 2023. New chassis and new engine, increasing its performance compared to the 93 variant, and equipped with a more powerful radio.

==== Eagle III ====
Switzerland (120)
120 Eagle III (SKdt Fz INTAFF gl 4×4, mobile artillery observer vehicles).
Acquired in 2003, with substantial improvements made to communications and surveillance equipment (yet lacking the machine gun of previous versions). The cost to purchase the vehicle amounted to CHF 166 million.

==== Eagle IV ====
Germany (495)
Eagle IV selected in 2008 as part of the GFF Klasse 2 tender.
- 42 EAGLE BAT (Protected Ambulance Vehicle)
  - 20 ordered urgently in 2009, delivered in 2011
  - 22 ordered in 2011
- 453 EAGLE GFF2 (Patrol Security Vehicles and Utility Vehicles for Command Staff)
  Urgent order of a first batch of 25 in July 2008 for a patrol vehicle for the ISAF operation. Three additional batches of GFF2 vehicles followed (173, 60 and 95). The vehicles are all equipped with RCWS KMW FLW100/200. The detailed variants in use in the German Army are:
  - PatSich (Patrouillensicherung, patrol vehicle)
  - FüPers (Führungspersonal, vehicle for Command Staff)
  - Instandsetzung Artillerie Führungs- und Waffeneinsatz System (Repair artillery command and weapon systems)
  - Windmesstrupp (weather balloon squad)
  - Spürhundetrupp Kampfmittelabwehr (K9 EOD squad)
  - Aufklärung zellularer Netze (telecommunication reconnaissance, COMINT)
  - Gesprächsaufklärung (field human intelligence)
  - Documentiong operations with various specialized teams and equipment (EKT in the German Army)
    - EKT (Einsatz-Kamera-Trupp, deployment camera squad) equipped with a camera mast on the roof
    - GKT (Geländekameratrupp, terrain camera squad)
    - Video-Aufnahmeausstattung (video recording equipment)
Denmark (90)
90 Eagle IV
Order in December 2005 and delivered in 2006–2007 to fulfill the urgent need for MRAP armoured patrol vehicles on the ISAF mission. It is equipped with a gunshot detection system Pilar MK-IIwm, and a BAE Bofors Lemur RCWS that carries whether a M2 Browning or a 40mm grenade launcher.

==== Eagle V ====
Denmark (93)
The tender process for the new Patrol Vehicle "Patruljekøretøjer program" began in 2015. Five vehicles were pre-selected, the Ocelot / Foxhoud, Nexter Aravis, Otokar Cobra 2, Oshkosh M-ATV / L-ATV, but only the Ocelot ended up competing against the Eagle V. This program resulted in the purchase of:
- 36 Multirole armoured vehicle
  Order in May 2017, deliveries in 2018–19.
  According to public records from the Danish Parliament, the acquisition cost DKK 233.6 million (approx. USD 35 million for the 36 vehicles), it includes all the equipment its (driving cameras, radios, weapons mounts). The sustainment of those vehicles over 15 years is estimated to be DKK 116.1 million (approx. USD 17.3 million). Variants in use in the Danish Army:
  - Patrol
  - Electronic Warfare
  - Support, Logistic
  - RECCE Closed
  - RECCE Open
- 56 Patrol Vehicle, Order in 2020
- 1 RECCE Open, Order in 2020
Germany (3,226)
Variants ordered:
- 4×4 EAGLE GFF2 (Patrol Security Vehicles and Utility Vehicles for Command Staff) orders
  - 176 in May 2013 as part of the GFF2 program for almost €110 million
  - 2,610 in December 2025 (option for 1,390)
- 6×6 mgSanKfz (Protected Ambulance Vehicle)
  - 80 in March 2020, deliveries from July 2023 to December 2024 for €148 million
  - 360 in December 2025 (option for 640)
Luxembourg (84)
Variants ordered:
- 4 6×6 PAV (Protected Ambulance Vehicle)
  Order in 2021
- 80 4×4 CLRV (command, liaison and reconnaissance vehicle)s (CLRV)
  Order in September 2022 by the NSPA for the Luxembourg Army, delivery from December 2024 to July 2026, replacement of the Humvee and the ATF Dingo.
  The mission equipment will be common to the French and Belgian VBMR Griffon. It will be fitted with the RWS deFNder Medium from FN Herstal, the information and combat system Scorpion (SICS from ATOS), the CONTACT radio system SDR from Thales and the anti-ied jammer BARAGE from Thales Belgium. The RCWS is equipped with a M2 machine gun, EO/IR sensors, and a 6-smoke grenades launcher.
  The acquisition cost is €226.6 million. The acquisition and the life cycle cost of the vehicle and the systems fitted, including the logistics for 15–20 years has a cost cap of €367 million. The deliveries started in 2024.
Switzerland (105)
- 5 Eagle V 4×4 EOD (explosive ordonance disposal)
  It is being used by the Swisscoy mission with the KFOR in Kosovo. It is armed with a M2 Browning heavy machine gun (12.7 mm) and a fixed-arraysmoke grenade launcher (76mm).
- 100 6×6 Aufklärungssystem TASYS (reconnaissance / intelligence vehicle)
  Order in December 2019, deliveries from mid 2023 to end 2025. 89 vehicles will equip 89 reconnaissance, scout and firing commander platoons that exist today. The remaining 11 will be used for training and as circulation reserve.

=== Retired vehicles ===
==== Eagle I ====
Switzerland (156)
156 Aufklärungsfahrzeug 93 (light armoured reconnaissance vehicle).
These vehicles were ordered and financed in 1993 for CHF 105 million, delivery from 1995, equipped with a 7.5mm Pz Mg 51/71 machine gun and fitted with thermal imaging and radio equipment. These vehicles were retired in 2020 and remain in reserve.
Denmark (36)
36 Spejdervogn M/95 (scout vehicle).
Purchased in 1994, delivered in 1995-1997, 27 of which were sold to FWW Fahrzeugwerke, a German private company; sale approved by the Swiss government in April 2013.

=== Potential operators ===
==== Eagle V ====
Ireland
The Irish Army is looking to replace its 80 Piranha III and its 27 RG-32. Among the potential successors are:
- Mowag Eagle V
- Mowag Piranha V
- VBMR-L Serval
- VBCI
- Boxer
Ireland mentions a need of 100 vehicles, a budget of €400 million. The split is unclear at the moment.
Japan (potentially 2,000)
The Thales Hawkei and the Eagle V 4×4 were both selected for an evaluation to find the successor of the 2,000 Komatsu LAV.
Spain
The Spanish Army is looking for a 6×6 vehicle for its cavalry. The Mowag Eagle V 6×6 is being considered, among many other options.
Switzerland
Eagle V 6×6, Führungsfahrzeug Kat. 3, a commanding vehicle as replacement for the M113A1 Kommandopanzer 63/07.
1. First batch - to be ordered in 2024 Budget of CHF260 million (= US$270 million on the 1stof July 2022). The quantity is unknown yet.
2. Second batch - to be ordered in 2026 or 2027 (mentioned in investment plan 2023–2035). The budget and quantity are unknown.

=== Failed bids ===
==== Eagle IV ====
Austria
GMTF Programme (Geschützte Mehrzweckfahrzeuge), 150 vehicles:
The Eagle IV was offered by GDELS Steyr to the Austrian Army, but the Iveco LMV was selected by the Austrian Army.
Norway
The Iveco LMV was selected by Norway in 2006, and was competing against the Mowag Eagle IV who lost the competition.

==== Eagle V ====
Australia
Project Land 121 Phase 4 – PMV-L:
This project intended to replace the Land Rover Perentie by a protected mobility vehicle- light. The competition included some of the JLTV competitors against vehicles manufactured and supported in Australia. GDLS-Australia offered the combat-proven Eagle V, the British Ocelot was another option, and Thales Australia offered the Hawkei which was developed in Australia. The Hawkei won the competition.
Belgium
CLV Programme (Command and Liaison Vehicles) - replacement of the Iveco LMV (Lynx):
The Eagle V lost to the JLTV in 2020. 322 vehicles planned, the other competitors were the Hawkei (Thales Australia), the URO VAMTAC and a vehicle from KMW.
Canada
The Mowag Eagle was proposed by General Dynamics Land Systems-Canada for the "Next Generation Fighting Vehicle programme" as the optimal solution. Vehicle demonstrations took place in 2019, but the programme was delayed. In January 2024 the competitive process was cancelled and in June the Joint Light Tactical Vehicle was selected.
Poland
Pegaz Programme: The Eagle V was part of the competitors for the new multi-purpose vehicle that intends to be used by the Special Operations Forces, Military Police and, in a longer run, by the land component in general. The first phase intended to participate in missions such as patrol, intervention, counterterrorism and reconnaissance scenarios. Four finalists were selected, the Fortress Mk2 (French), Thales Hawkei (Australia), Patriot II (Polish / Czech) and Tur V. In 2021, the programme was cancelled.
United States
JLTV program:
The GTV JLTV Eagle, was offered by GDLS as a replacement for the Humvee but lost the competition.

== Civilian operators ==
=== Summary ===
Operators	Eagle IV	Eagle V	In service
German Federal Police (Bundespolizei)	10	0	10
Kantonspolizei Zürich	0	1	1
TOTAL	10	1	11

=== Current operators ===
==== Eagle IV ====
Germany, German Federal Police (10)
It was ordered in 2011 to be used in Afghanistan. The vehicles came back from deployment in 2015, and since then have replaced the Sonderwagen SW4 Thyssen TM in their use to protect airports.
- 3 vehicles at the Berlin Brandenburg Airport
- 3 vehicles at the Frankfurt Airport
- 3 vehicles at the Munich Airport
- 1 vehicles at the Stuttgart Airport The Federal Police also uses Mercedes Enok for this mission, but it wasn't adapted to be used in Afghanistan. The Federal Police uses their Mowag Eagle also for the protection of international events such as the G20 summit held in 2017 in Hamburg.

==== Eagle V ====
Switzerland, Zurich Cantonal Police (1)
One Eagle V is in use, it is located at Zurich Airport.

== Gallery ==
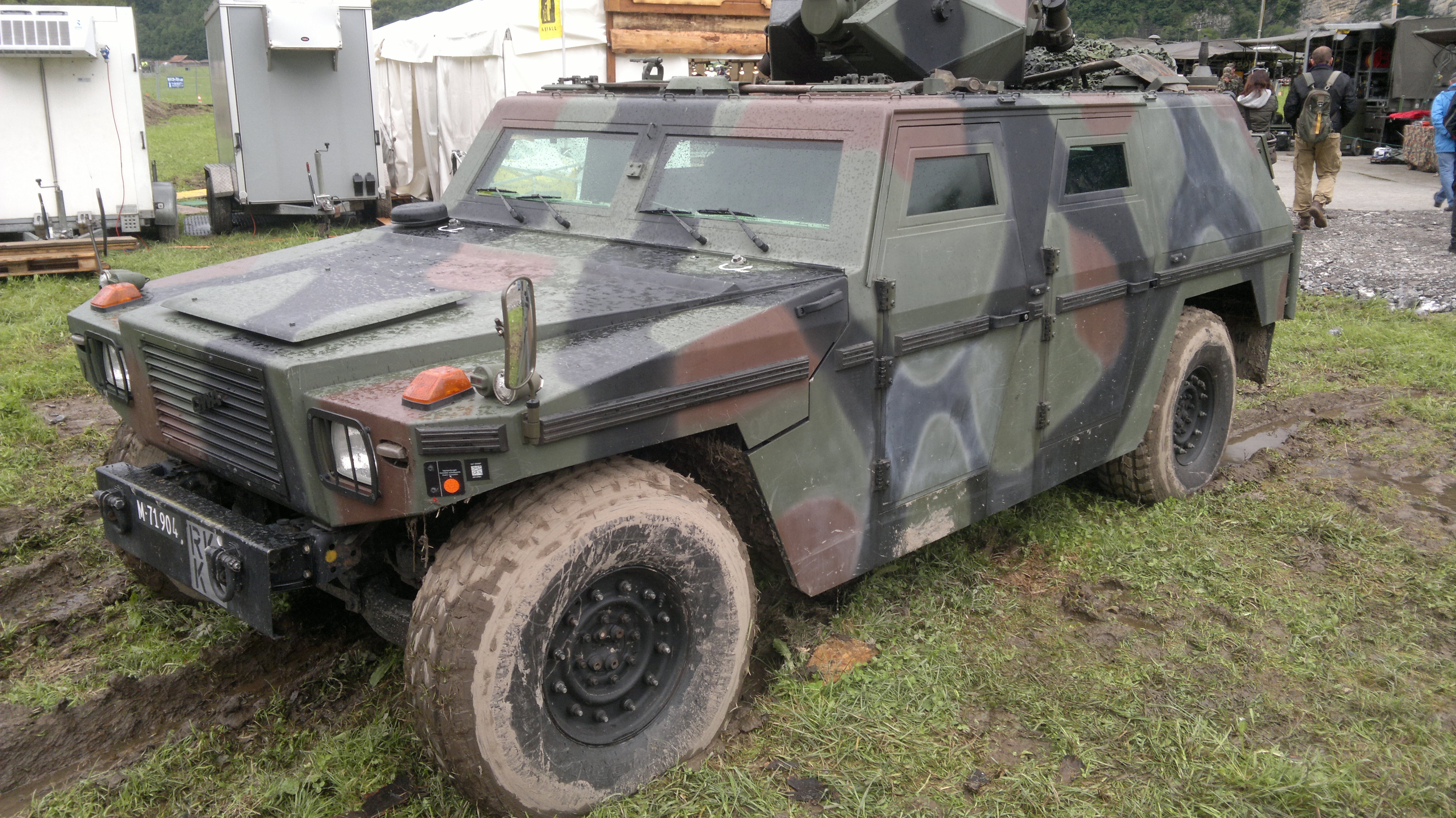
Eagle I, Swiss Army, AufklFz 93

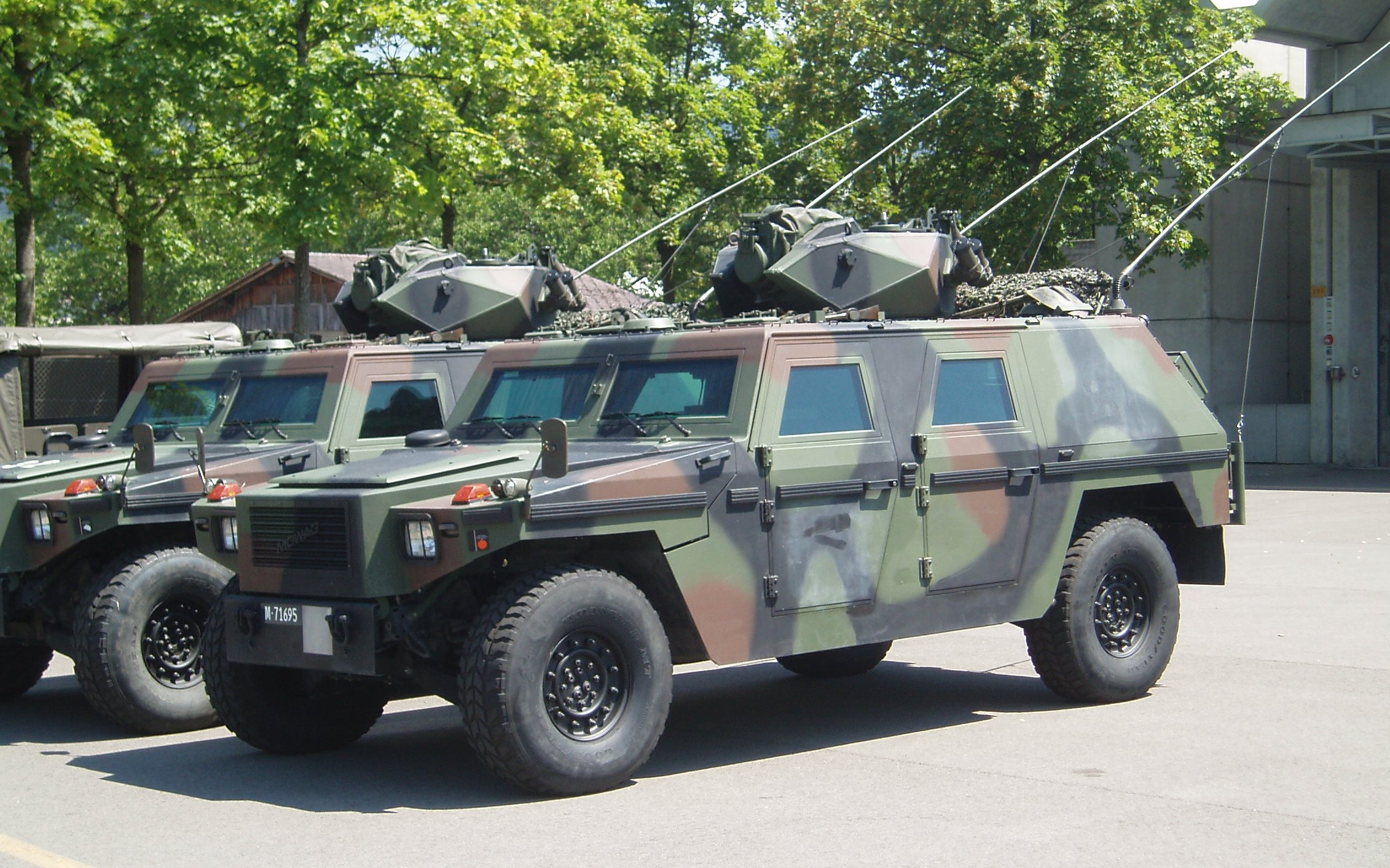
Eagle II, Swiss Army, AufklFz 97

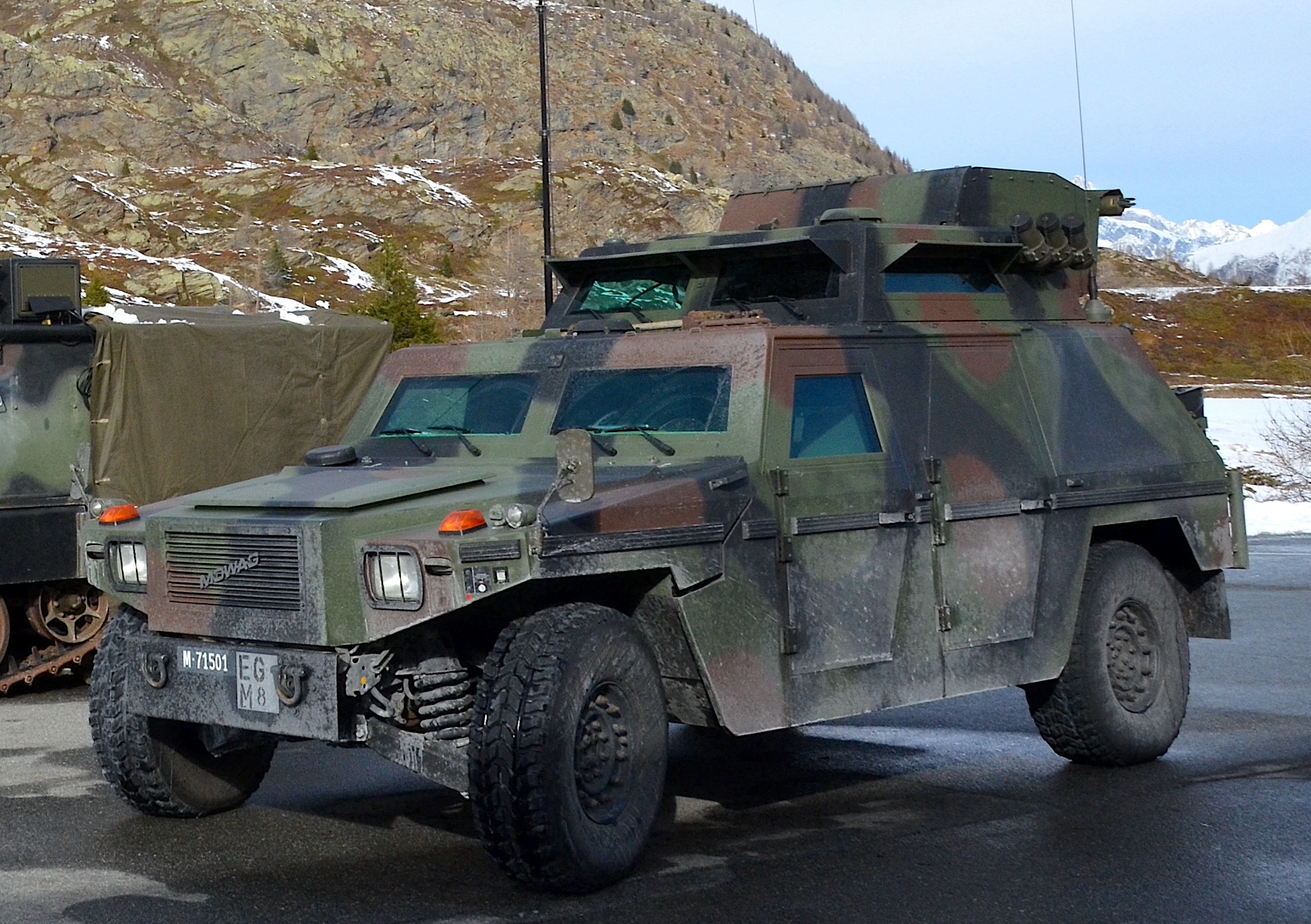
Eagle III, Swiss Army, SKdt Fz INTAFF gl 4×4

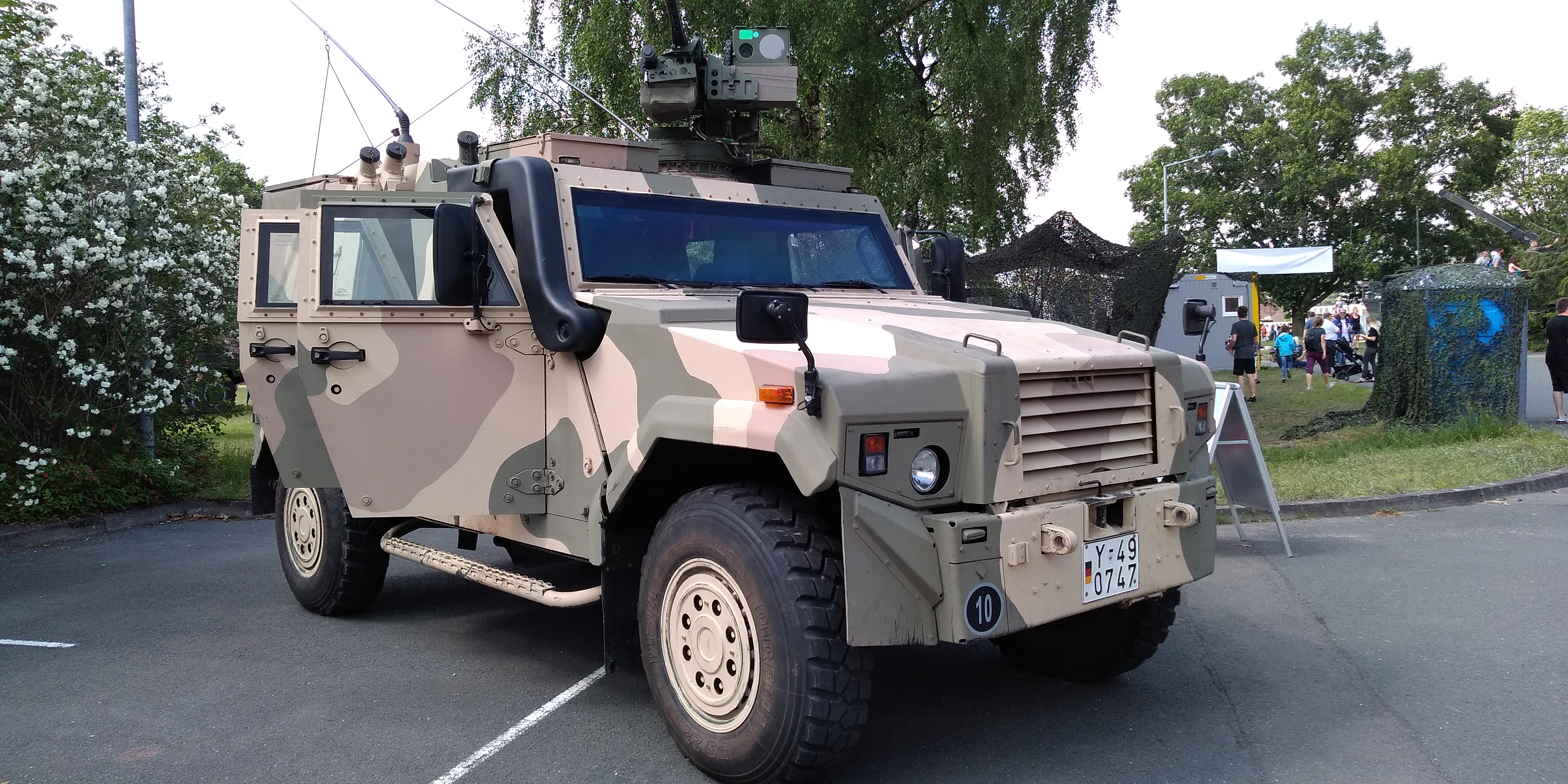
Eagle IV, German Army, PatSich

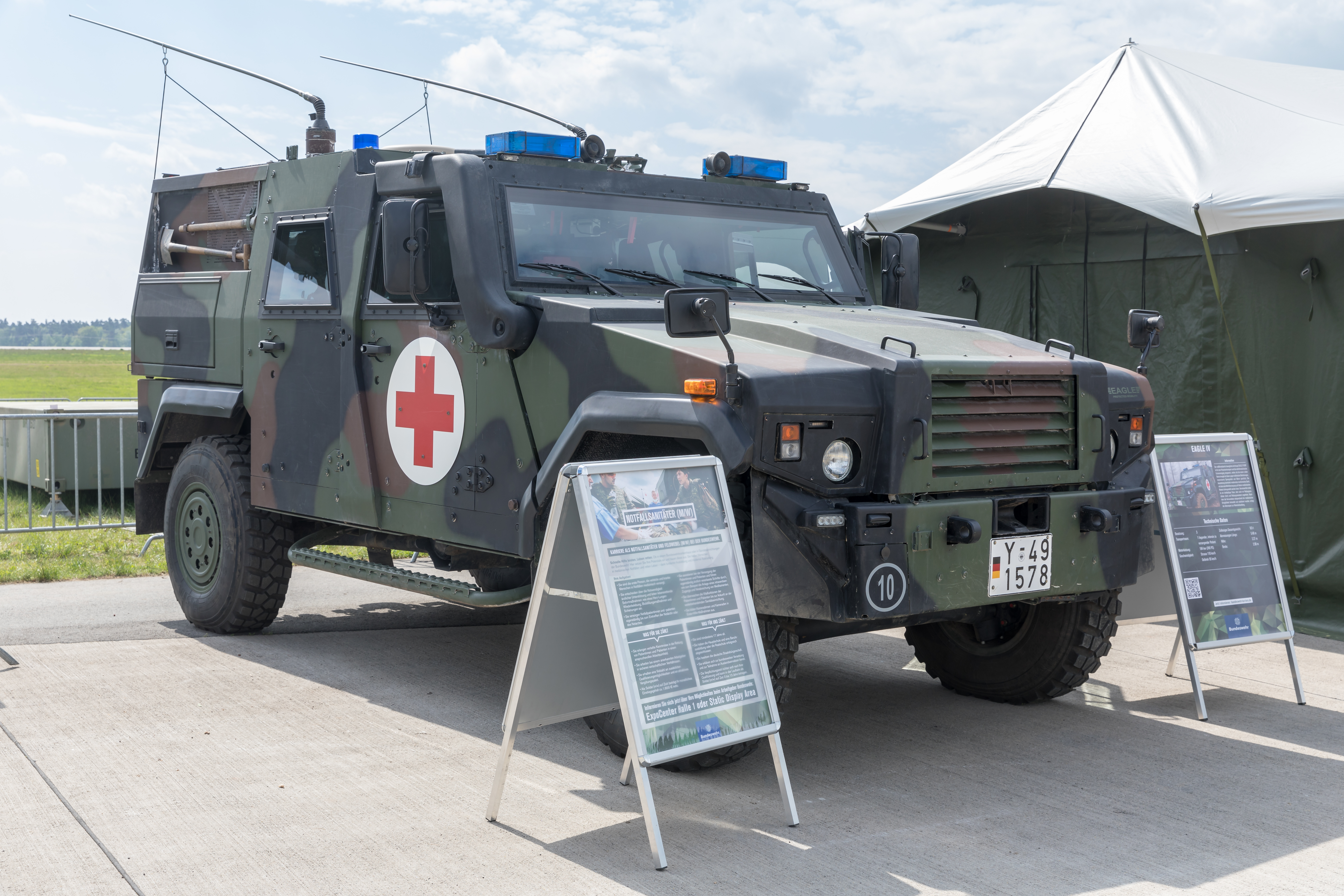
Eagle IV, German Army, BAT (Beweglicher Arzttrupp)

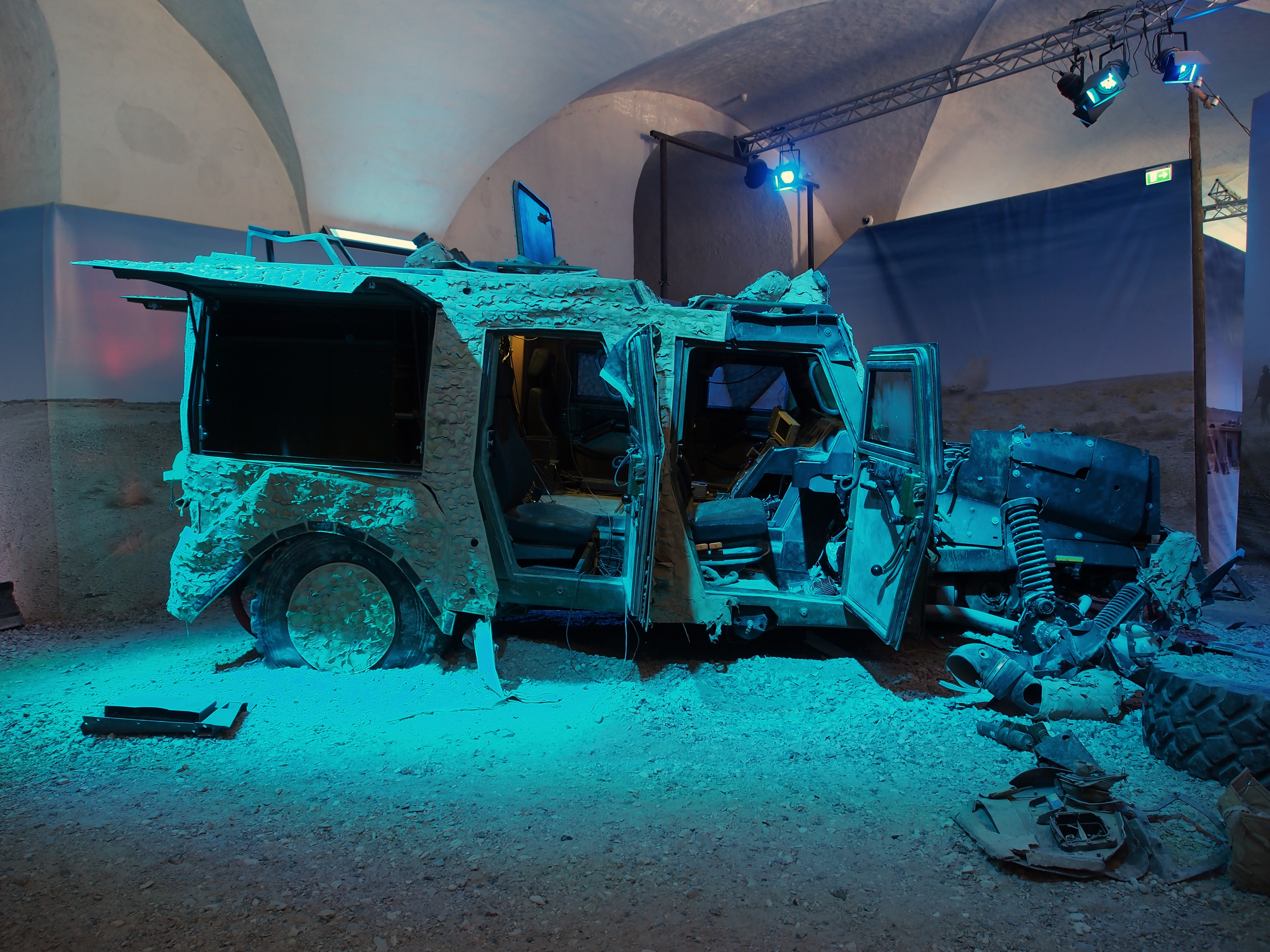
Eagle IV, Danish Army, IED exploded vehicle

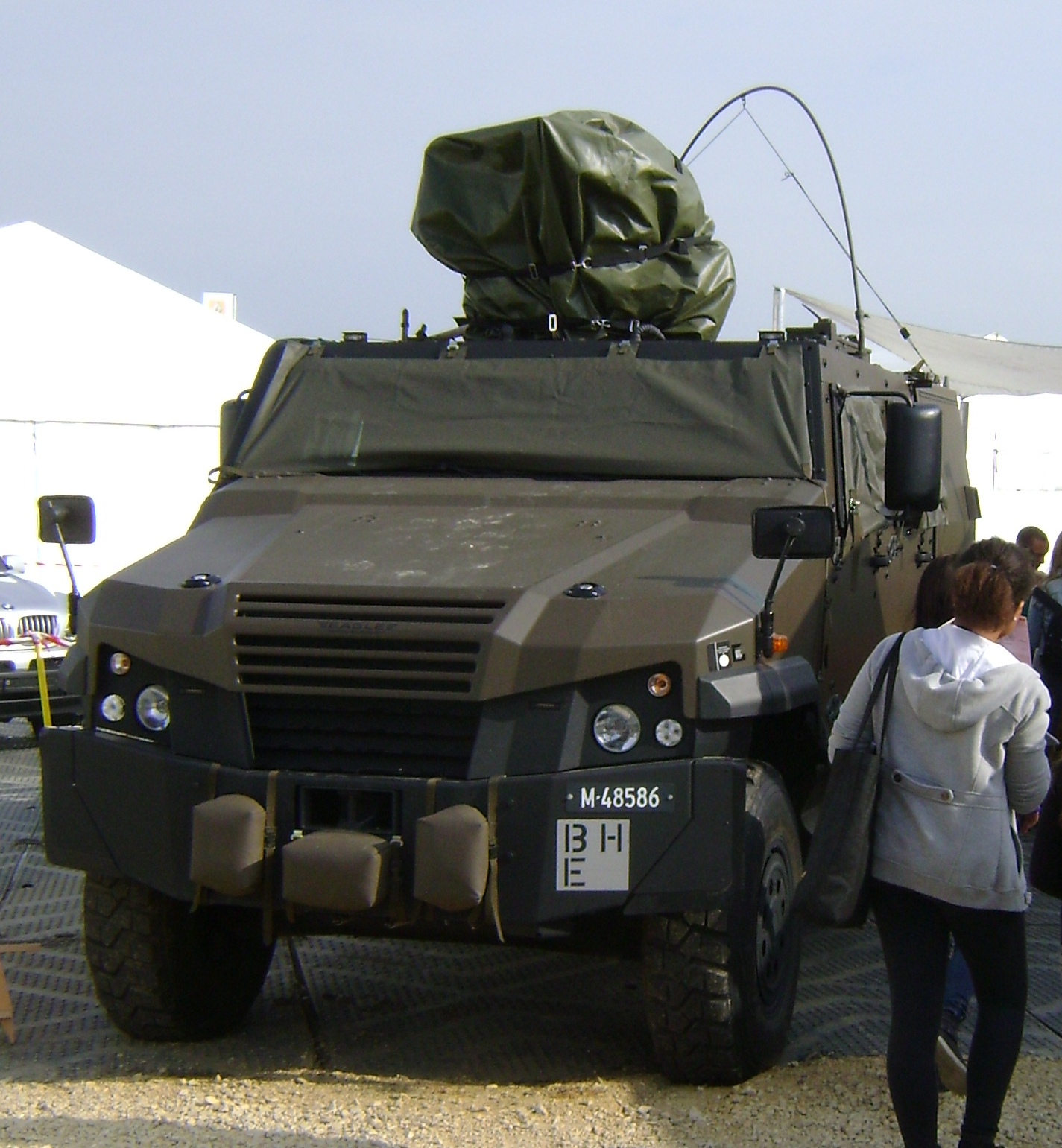
Eagle V 4×4, Swiss Army, Aufklfz EOR 4×4 gl

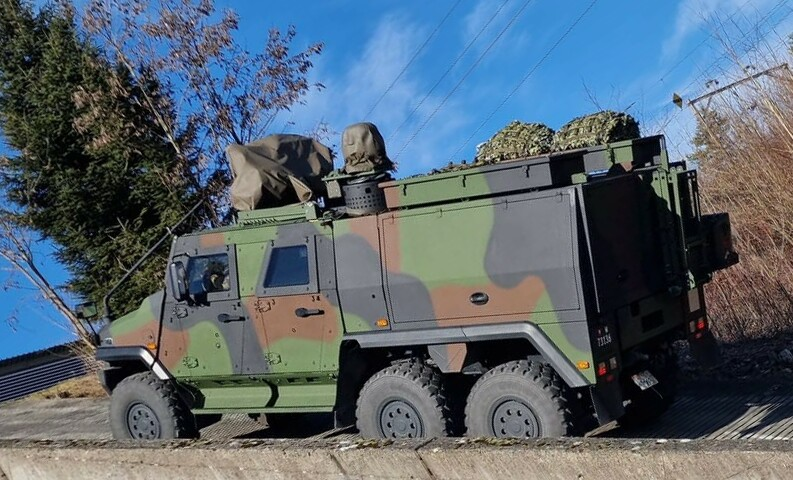
Eagle V 6×6, Swiss Army, Aufklärungssystem TASYS
