= Mowag Duro =

Military transport vehicles

DURO series
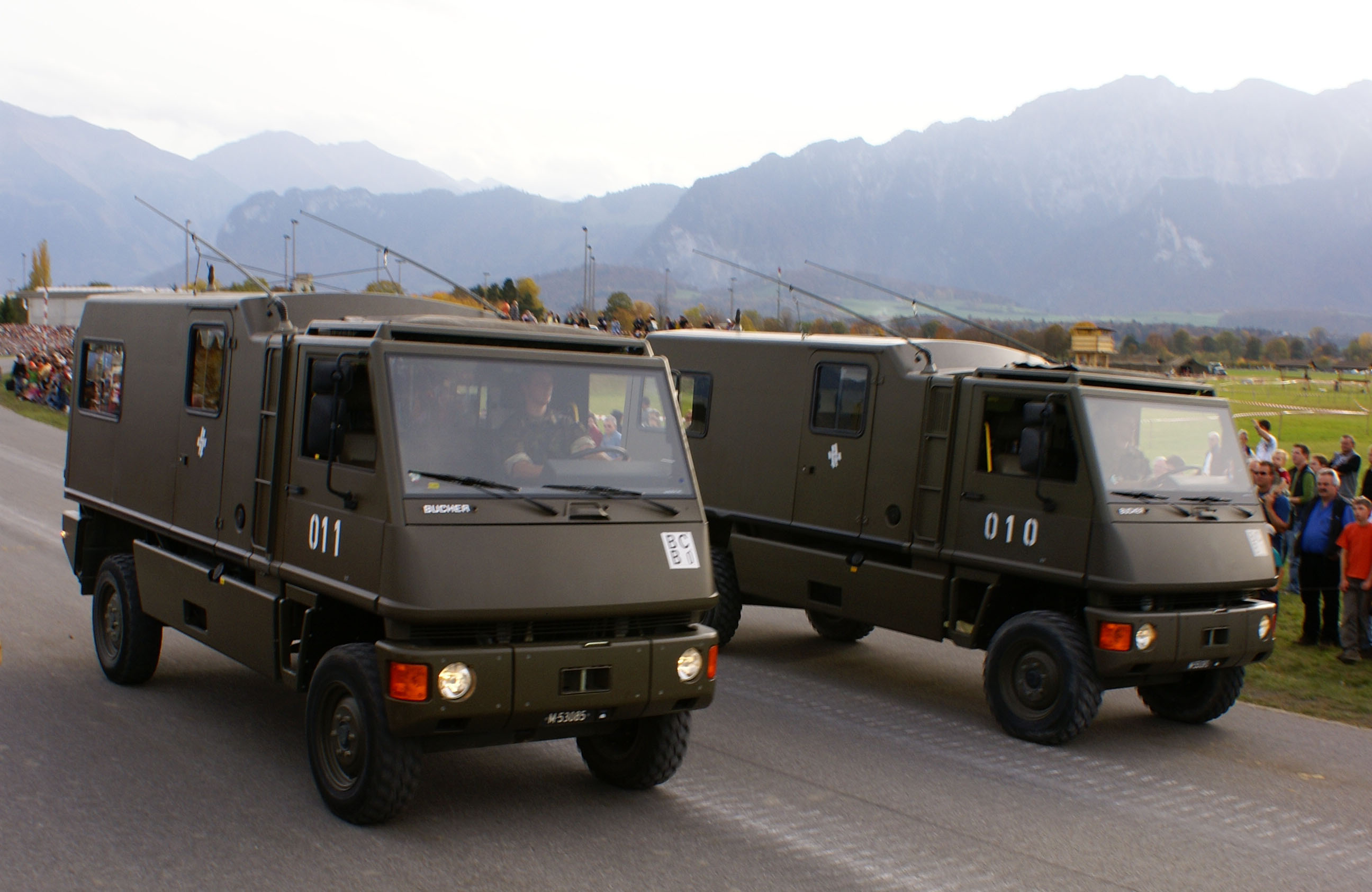
- Swiss Armed Forces DURO (Command Unit)
- Place of origin: Switzerland

Service history
- In service: 1994-present
- Used by: Switzerland, Germany, Venezuela, UK, Ireland, Denmark

Production history
- Designer: Bucher-Guyer AG
- Designed: 1994
- Manufacturer: Bucher-Guyer AG, 1994-2003 GDELS Mowag GmbH, 2003-present
- Developed into: Eagle IV, Eagle V 4×4, Eagle V 6×6
- Produced: 1994-present
- No. built: 4000
- Variants: DURO; DUROII; DURO III 4×4; DURO III 6×6; DURO IIIP 6×6 YAK

The DURO (Durable Robust) is a series of wheeled, multi-purpose military transport vehicles produced by General Dynamics European Land Systems/MOWAG in both four and six wheel drive. It was initially developed for Switzerland by Bucher-Guyer AG in Niederweningen, Switzerland. An initial 3000 vehicles order for the Swiss Armed Forces came through in 1994. In January 2003 the production was transferred to MOWAG in Kreuzlingen. Over 4,000 DURO 4×4 and 6×6 vehicles are now in service worldwide. The main customers are Switzerland, Germany, Venezuela, and the UK. In addition to these, the vehicle is used in many other countries for special purposes.

== DURO III ==
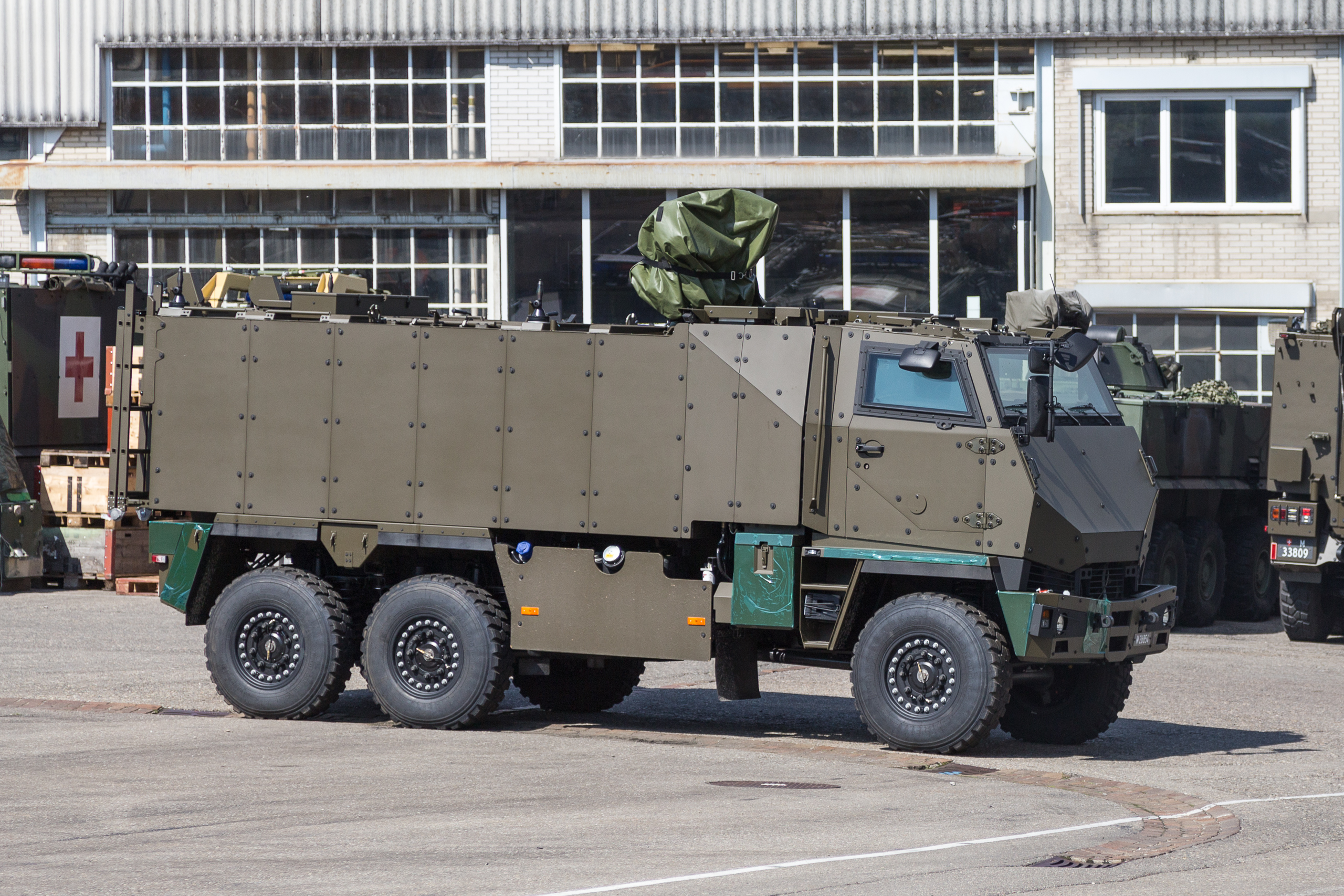
A DURO IIIP of the Swiss Army

The DURO III is available as a 4×4, 6×6, and an armoured 6×6 with modular shelter.

=== DURO IIIP / DURO GMTF ===
The DURO IIIP ( also named DURO GMTF) is a version only available in 6×6 form. It is heavily armoured and has a remote controlled machine-gun. It is used by the Danish Army as an ambulance, and by the Swiss Army in the roles of APC, NBC-Reconnaissance and ambulance in international peace support missions of Swissint. The DURO IIIP is also used by Germany.

=== YAK ===
The YAK is an upgraded, ballistic and mine-protected, variant of the DURO IIIP 6×6 chassis used by the German Army. It is made by Rheinmetall MAN Military Vehicles.

The German Army uses the YAK for a variety of roles. The first batch of DURO III vehicles for Germany consisted of 30 vehicles, consisting of ambulance (12), Explosive Ordnance Disposal (EOD) (10), military police (four) and support vehicles for the LUNA Unmanned Aerial Vehicle (four). Final deliveries were made late in 2005. Another 100 vehicles were ordered, with deliveries between 2006 and 2009. The actual contract covered the supply of 100 Yak chassis and a total of 114 bodies in the following configurations: 31 × mobile medical team; 8 × prisoner transport; 6 × water cannon; 23 × command post for military police; 23 × air base security; 2 × military geography; 21 × explosive ordnance disposal. Late in 2007 an order was placed by the German Army for another batch of seven Yak vehicles, six additional LUNA ground stations and a BIO reconnaissance vehicle.

In 2008, RMMV delivered three armoured NBC field laboratories to the Swiss Army which are similar to the Yak.

=== Specifications ===
The 420 Duro GMTF ordered by the Swiss Army are equipped with a Protector RWS and a diesel engine Cummins ISB5-9 (275 hp).

232 Duro-3P were exported, and are equipped with a diesel engine Cummins 6BTA-5.9 (245 hp).

=== MOWAG Eagle IV and V ===
The MOWAG Eagle IV and V were based on the DURO IIIP chassis.

== Civil use ==
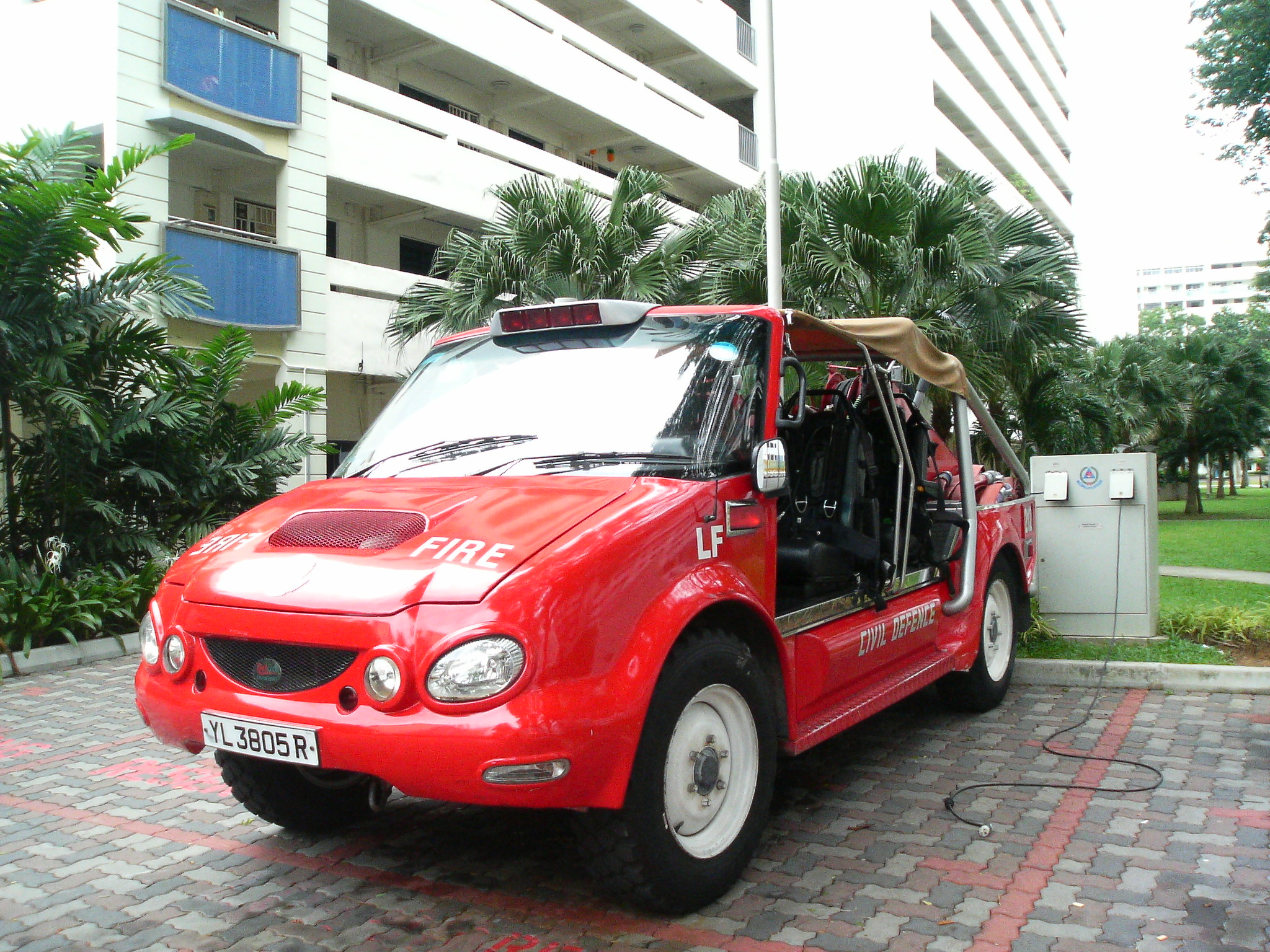
Duro chassis, LFAV, "Red Rhino" for the Singapore Civil Defence Force.

The 4×4 and 6×6 Duro was also offered in various configurations as a fire engine:

- Emergency vehicle for up to 16 firefighters
- Hose laying vehicle with 2 x 1000m hoses.
- Small fire engine with fire 800l tank
- Liquid transporter 800l water & 100l foam.

These vehicles are in use in different fire units in Switzerland, such as the fire departments of Bern, Frick, Baar.

In the 1990s, consideration was given to introducing the Duro to the fire service of the former GDR as a substitute for the Robur LO. Robur and Duro have similar exterior dimensions, therefore existing fire houses required no structural alterations for new vehicles. The conversion failed due to the purchase price of Duro, which exceeded the financial strength of the fire departments.

The 4×4 Duro was also offered as a commercial vehicle for communities and municipalities as dump trucks or with solid aluminum construction as service vehicles, but there were no significant sales. Also in the configuration as a civilian ambulance, there were no successes.

A small number of vehicles are provided as expedition vehicles, privately owned. Converted from civilian companies or individuals as offroad campers, coach expedition and expedition vehicle based on 4×4 and 6×6 Duro.

The Singapore Civil Defence Force uses LFAVs, based on the chassis of the Duro, dubbed the Red Rhino. The Johannesburg fire department has also purchased Duro's as firefighting vehicles.

== Operators ==
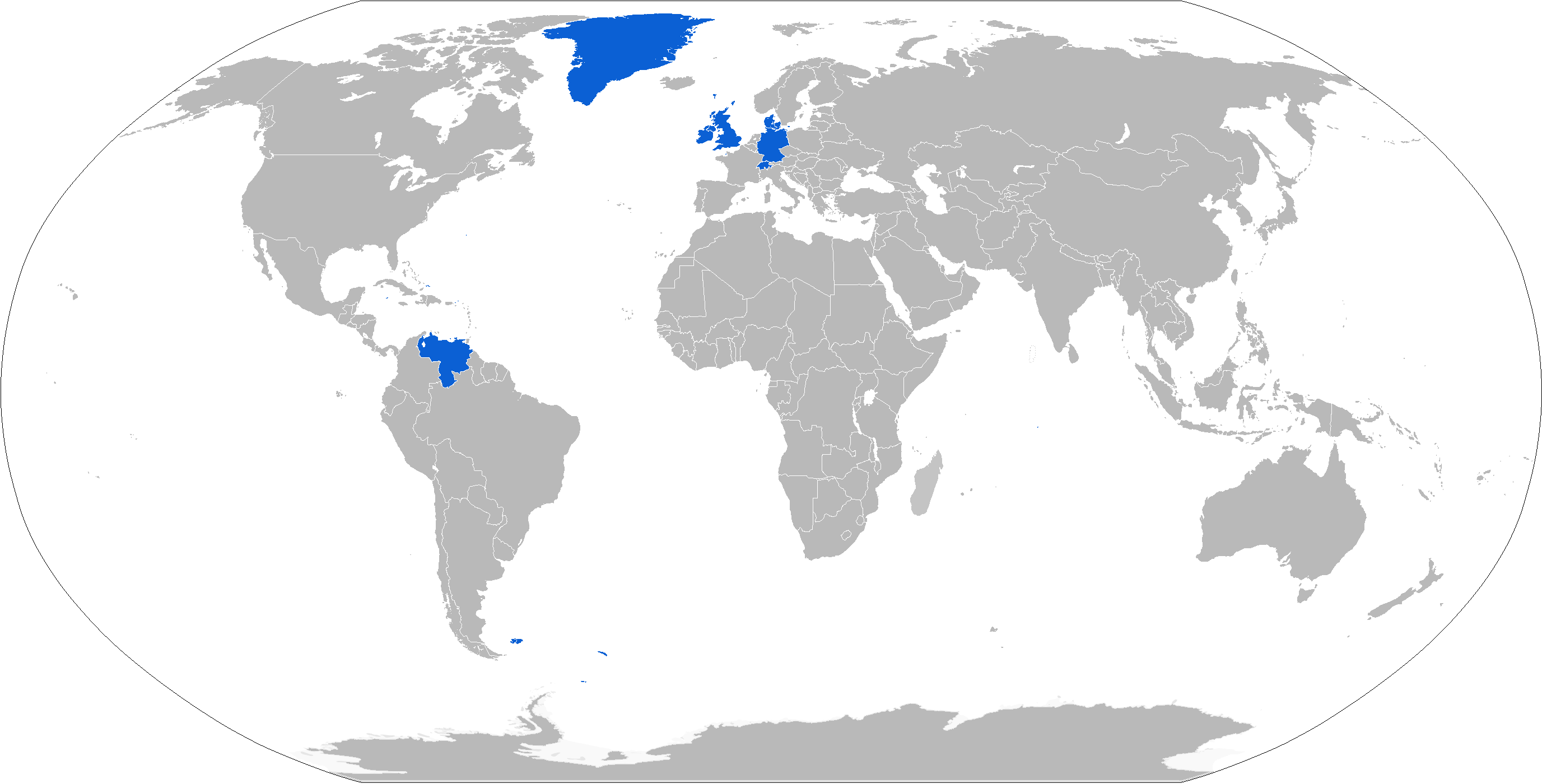
Map with Duro operators in blue

=== Current operators ===
- Bolivia Policía Boliviana
- Denmark
- Germany
- Ireland
- Malaysia
- Switzerland
- United Kingdom
- Venezuela

== Procurement ==
=== DURO 4×4 ===
- Singapore civil protection (61)
  - LFAV (Light Fire Attack firefighting Vehicle, derived from Duro I chassis)
- South Africa, city of Johannesburg (14)
  - firefighting trucks
- Switzerland (3'000)
  - 1'940 troop transport "Lastwagen Mannschaftsaufbau" variant
  - 24 to operate the Ranger 95 UAV (from 1999 to 2020)
    - 8 commanding stations "Kdow L"
    - 8 launcher "WA Katapult ADS 95"
    - 8 working station "Wew I Wa ADS 95"
  - 28 Duro + trailer include meteorologic radar + balloons for the artillery "Peilw Wet P-763 Kasch", (providing temperature / humidity / wind profiles of the atmosphere to the INTAFF artillery commanding system).
  - quantity unknown command vehicle, "Kdow LWA"
  - quantity unknown artillery command vehicle, "Fkw L WA M2+ M INTAFF"
  - quantity unknown, communications vehicle with a trailer, "Fhrw L KA FIS" (4 SE-235 + 1 SE-240 radios)
  - quantity unknown workshop vehicle + trailer, "Werkstattwagen DIFAMO"
  - quantity unknown, workshop vehicle, "Repw LWA A5 Spz"
  - (2'200 were modernised, so among the drones mentioned above)

=== DURO 6×6 ===
- Switzerland (7)
  - 3 Ambulance vehicles "Sanw sch WA gepz"
  - 4 APC "Lastw L gepz" (used with KFOR)

=== DURO-2 4×4 and 6×6 ===
- Ireland (6)
  - EOD variants
  - Maintenance variant
- Malaysia (57)
- United Kingdom (124)
  - 6 EOD vehicles
  - 118 communication systems carriers
- Venezuela (358)

=== DURO-3 ===
- Denmark (29)
  - 29 Ambulance ($ 26 million / 190 million DKr)
- Germany (205)
  - 30 Duro–3
  - 175 YAK
    - 12 Ambulance vehicles
    - 4 Feldjäger (MP)
    - 4 Luna UAV launcher / receptor
    - 10 EOD (explosive ordnance disposal)
    - 100 transport vehicles (tactical transport, electronic warfare, etc) reinforced protection
- Switzerland (437)
  - 420 DURO–3P (GMTF) APC
    - tranche 1, 220 ordered in 2008
      - 6 DURO–3P APC for SWISSINT (used with the KFOR / Swisscoy)
      - 4 DURO–3P ambulance among GMTF for SWISSINT (used with the KFOR / Swisscoy)
    - tranche 2, 70 ordered in 2010
    - tranche 3, 130 ordered in 2013
  - 12 DURO–3P CBRN detection vehicle ordered in 2008, in service since 2015
  - 5 DURO–3P Explosive Ordinance Disposal EOD (5 delivered in 2008)
- United Kingdom (66)
  - 18 EOD vehicles
  - 48 communication systems carriers

== See also ==
- AGF (Light infantry vehicle)
- Armoured Multi-Purpose Vehicle (AMPV)
- ATF Dingo
- Boxer (Armoured Fighting Vehicle)
- KMW Grizzly
- LAPV Enok
- Mungo ESK
- Pinzgauer High Mobility All-Terrain Vehicle - a rather similar, but older, Austrian vehicle
- RMMV TPz (Transportpanzer) Fuchs

== Gallery ==
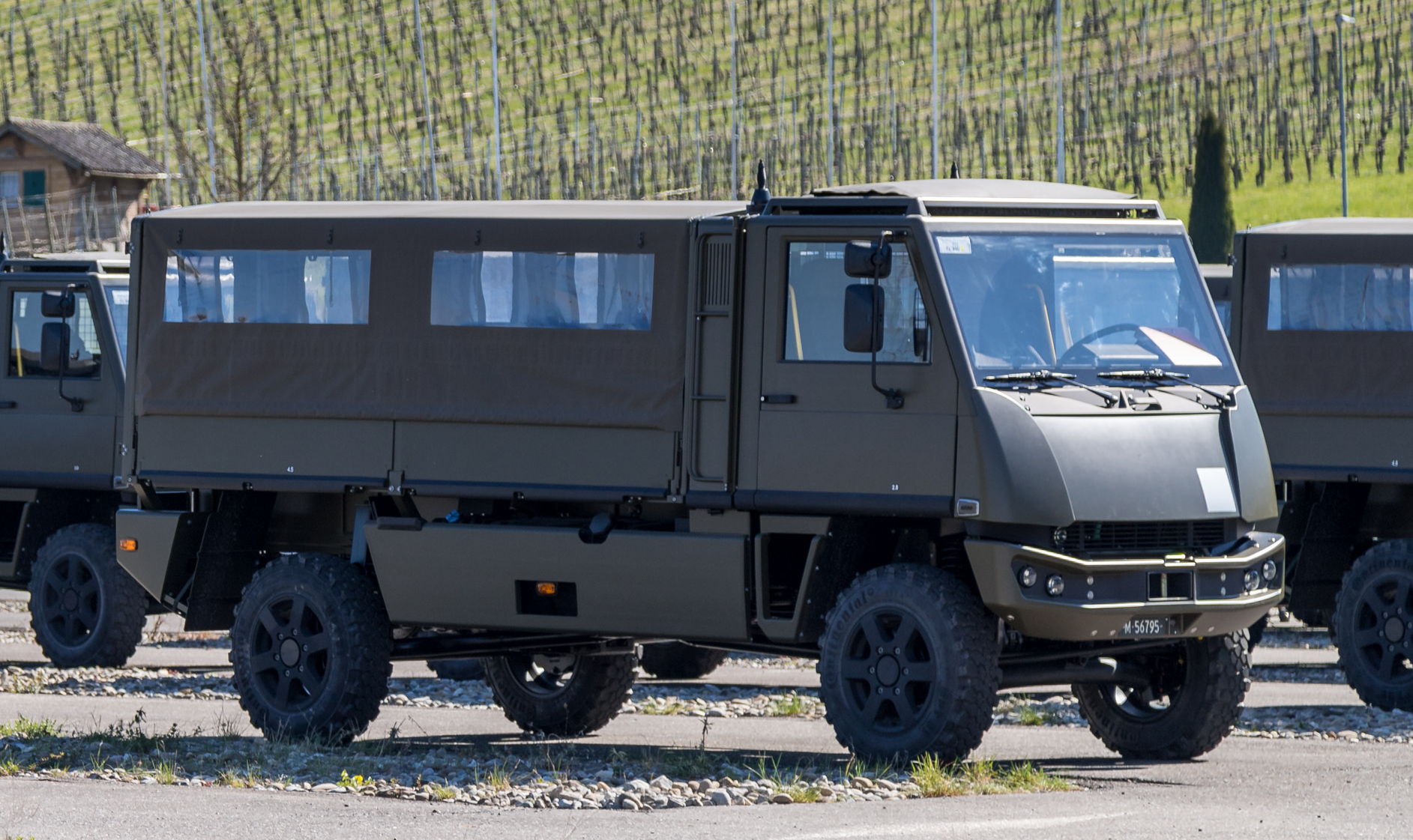
MOWAG Duro I WE by the Swiss Army

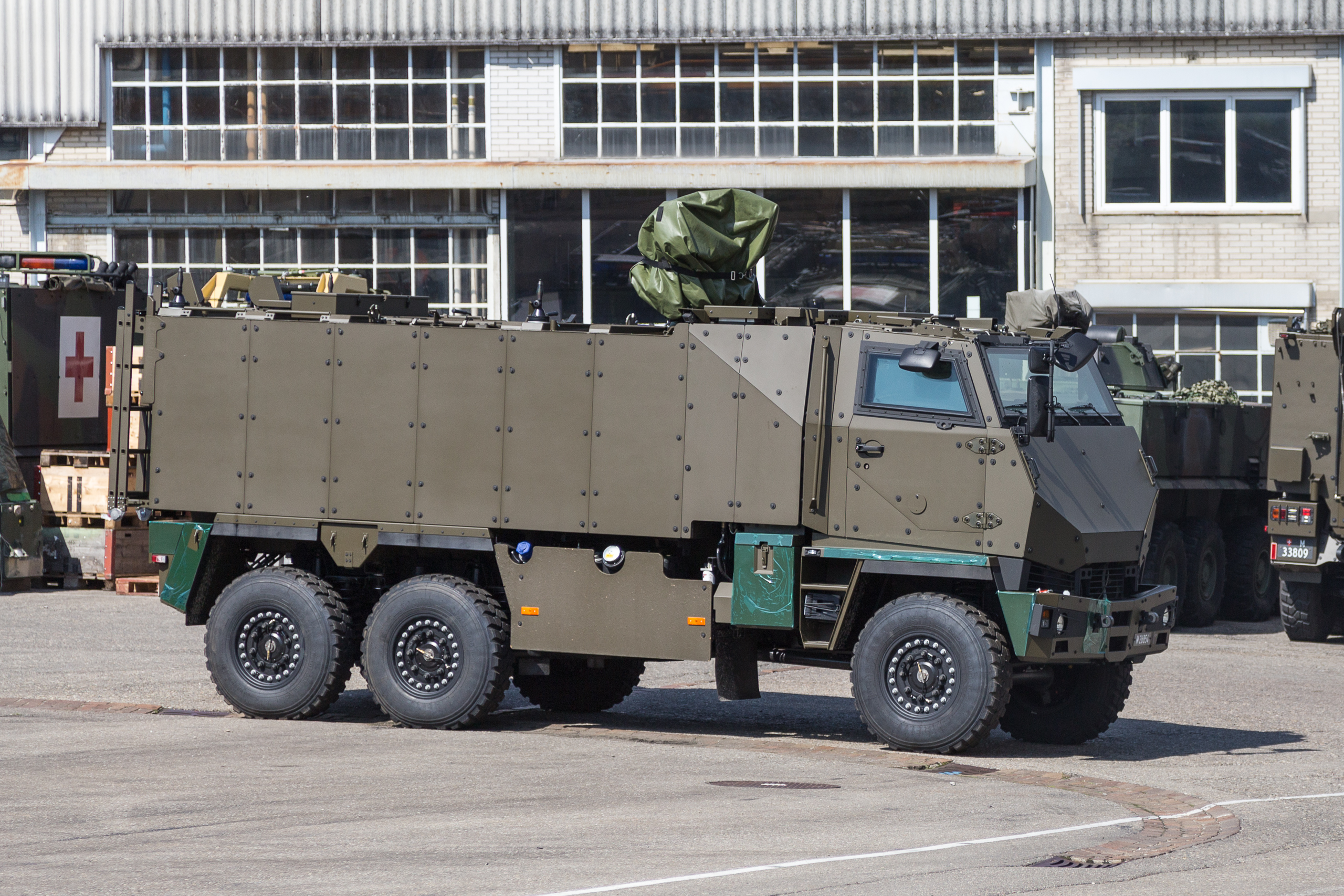
MOWAG Duro IIIP ordered by the Swiss Army

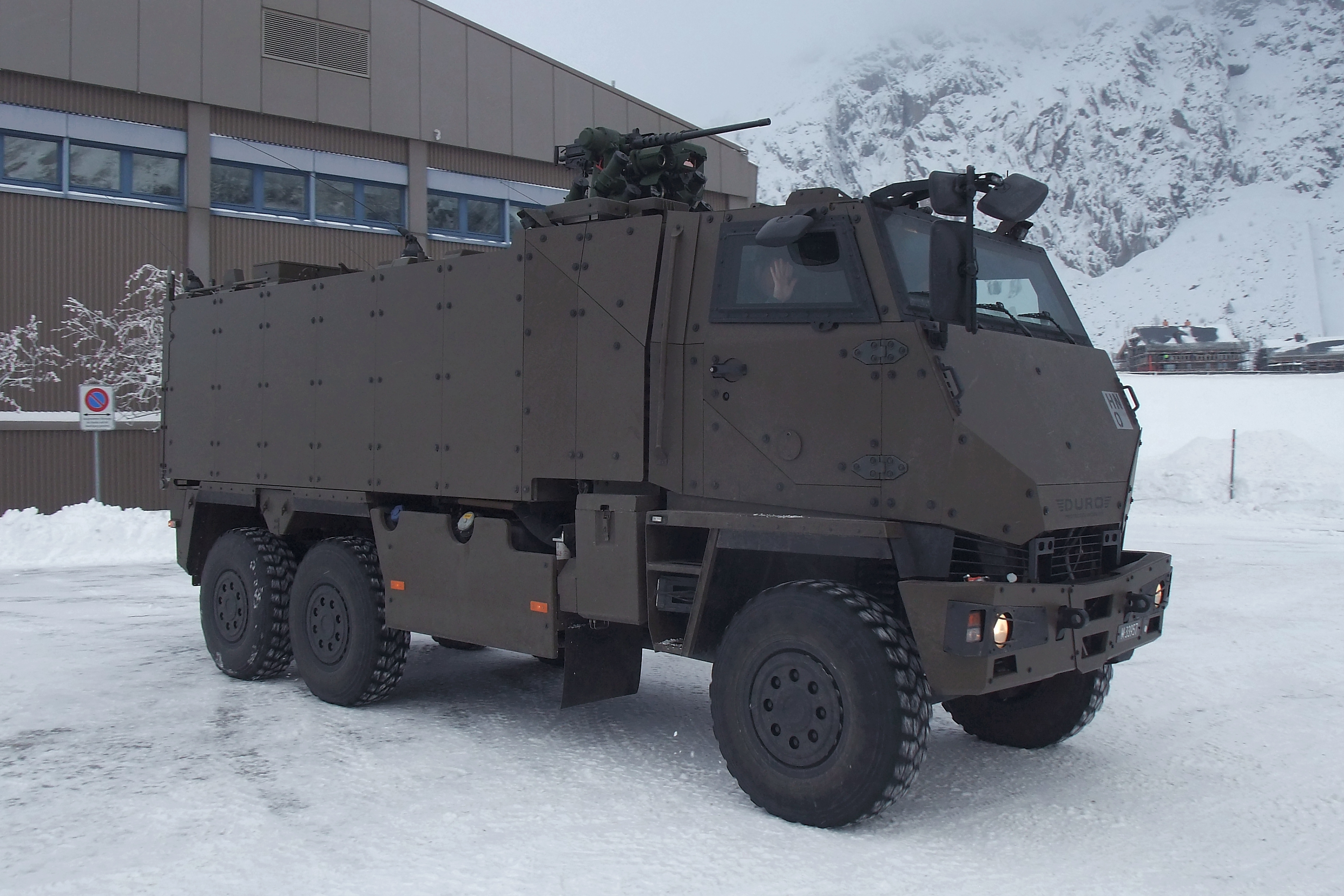
DURO IIIP / Duro GMTF Swiss Army

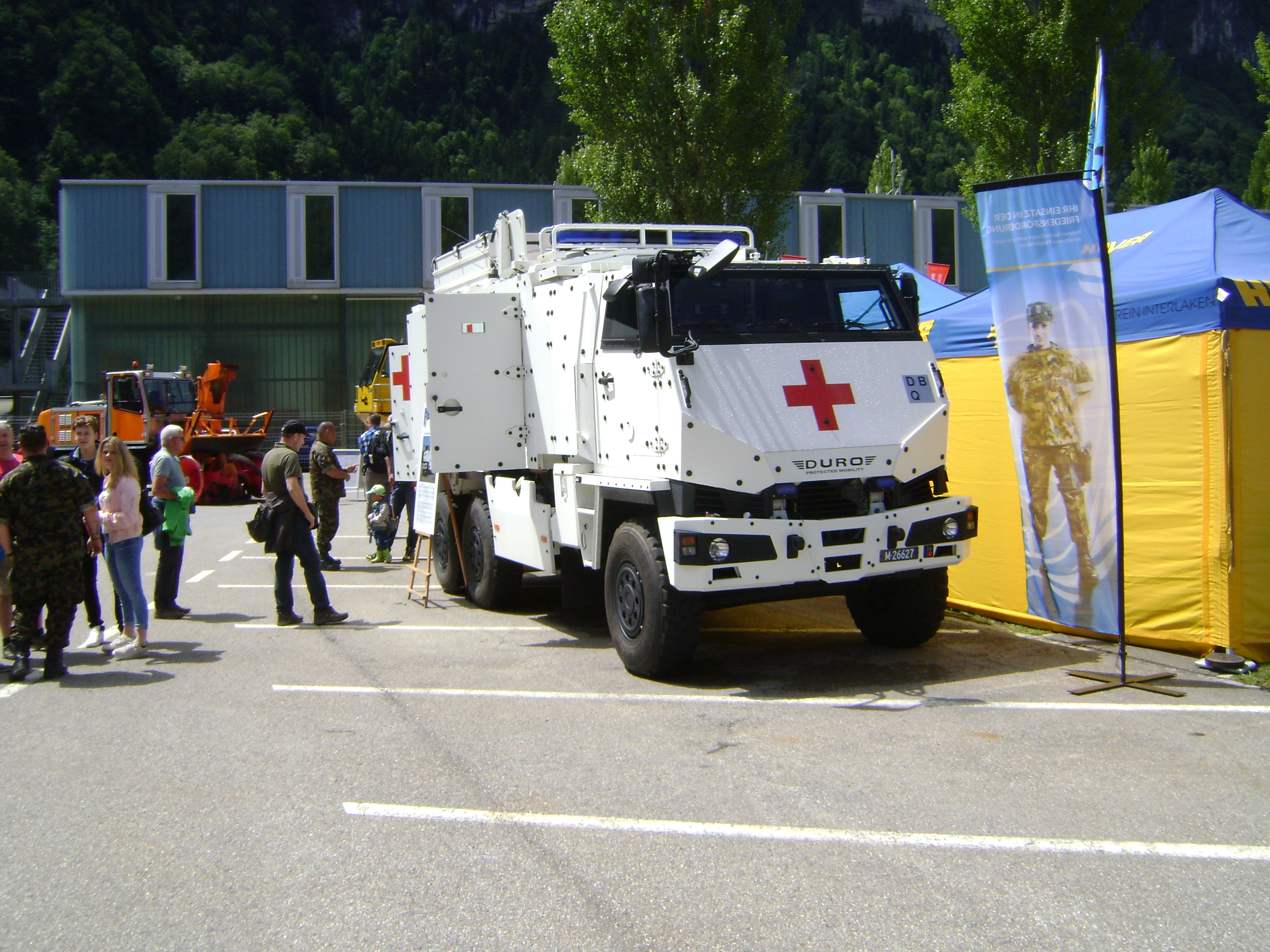
MOWAG Duro IIIP Ambulance from the Swissint
