= Ustertag =

1830 revolution in Kanton Zürich

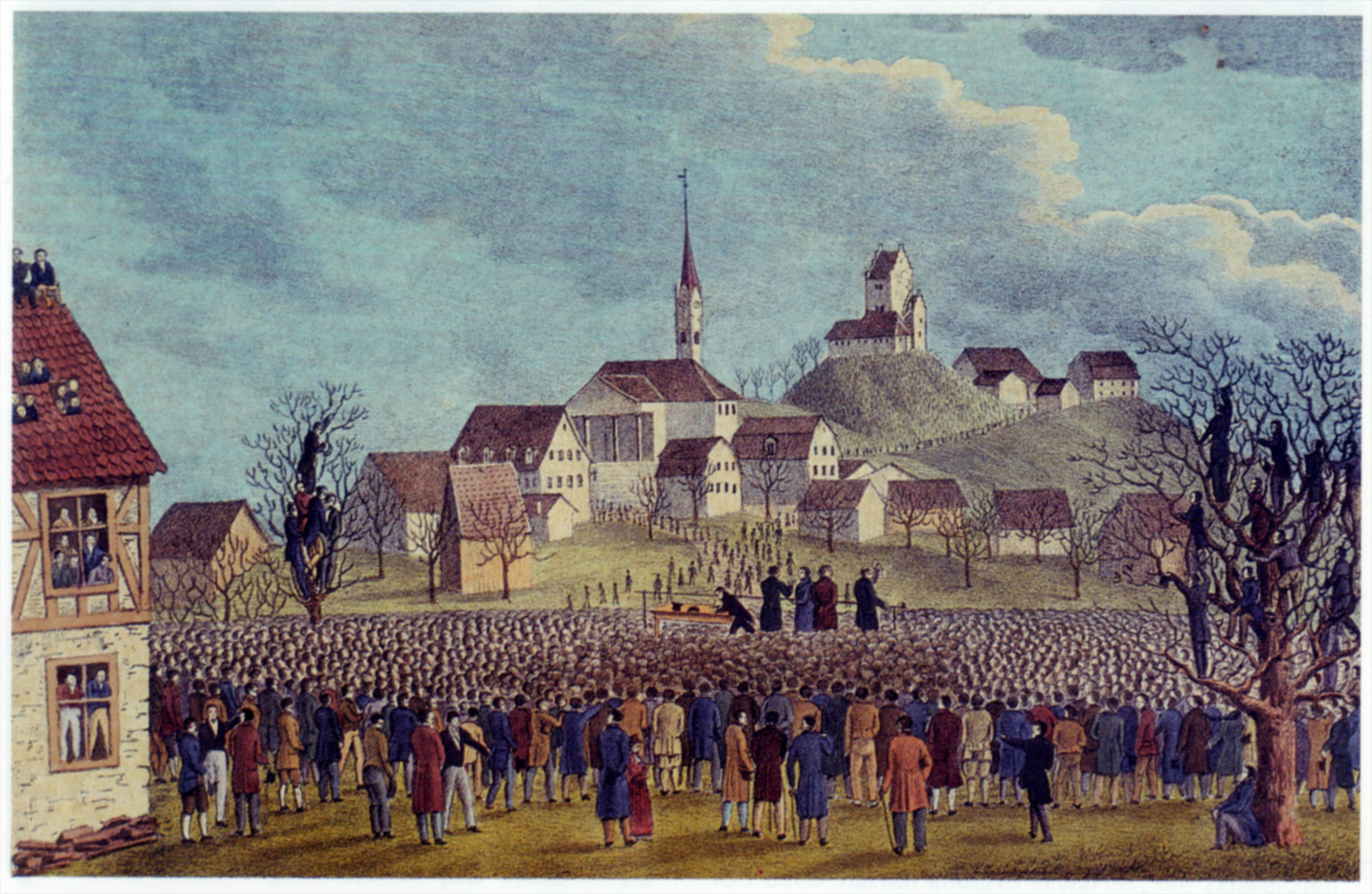
Ustertag on 22. November 1830, the Uster church and the castle in the background

The Ustertag occurred on 22 November 1830, when 10,000 men of the Canton of Zürich gathered on Zimiker hill and demanded a new constitution. Their primary concern was parity between the urban and rural areas. The Ustertag is described as a "revolution" due to its impact, its focus, and its speed of events, which caused great change in the Canton of Zurich.

== The name ==
Ustertag refers to the name of the town (Uster) where the meeting occurred, and Tagung or political assembly.

== Background ==
In the Middle Ages the city of Zurich acquired a number of rural areas. The rural population were poor and uneducated while politically and economically under the control of the city. During the French controlled Helvetic Republic in 1798 the ideas of freedom and equality spread. The medieval idea of different laws for city citizens and countryside peasants was overthrown. However, in 1803 the Helvetic Republic collapsed and was replaced by the Act of Mediation which struck a compromise between the Ancien Regime and a Republic. In the following years, even the limited freedoms under the Act were undermined and following Napoleon's defeat in 1813 the Act was overturned. In the Restoration, which started in 1814, the new constitution reduced the representation of rural areas in the cantonal councils.

Following the French July Revolution of 1830, revolutionary movements sprang up across Switzerland. The first assembly was held near Weinfelden in Thurgau in October and November 1830. Followed in November by meetings in Wohlenschwil, Aargau then Sursee, Lucerne. In November 1830, Dr. Ludwig Snellhalf wrote several pamphlets including the Memorial von Küsnacht (The Memorial of Küsnacht) which argued that the canton was known for its liberalism and the canton should embrace the changes that were sweeping Europe. A short time later, about a hundred men gathered in Stäfa, near Zurich, and decided to hold a meeting in Uster, the most central location in the canton of Zürich with the large St. Andreas Church. However, when 10,000–12,000 men attended, the church could not hold the crowd and the Tagung or assembly adjourned to the nearby Zimiker Hill.

While there were a number of different assemblies that met throughout Switzerland in 1830–31, each assembly called for two main changes in the new cantonal constitutions. First, they called for peacefully adjusting the constitutions by adjusting the way seats in local legislatures and the Tagsatzung were allocated. In particular they objected to what they saw as the over-representation of the cantonal capital in the government. Secondly, they sought a way to amend the constitution. Very few cantons even had a way to amend or modify the constitutions, and none of them allowed citizen's initiatives to be added.

Following a day of speeches, in the evening they went peaceably back to their homes, without rioting or violence.

== Effects of the Ustertag ==
Once on 6 December, a new Cantonal Council German: Grossräte was elected with two-thirds of the representatives coming from the rural areas. By March 1831 a new constitution was in force that addressed most of the points from the Ustertag.

The Ustertag of 1830 and other assemblies of 1830–31 had a significant impact on the former Swiss Confederation. The political reforms that came after these assemblies ended the period known as the Restoration and led to the Regeneration period which led to the Constitution of 1848 and the creation of the Swiss federal state. The Ustertag day is still celebrated by keynote speeches in the Swiss Reformed Church.

The assemblies of 1830–31 also led to the introduction of a new word into the German language. These assemblies were collectively known in Swiss German as Putsch, which later made its way into standard German as a political term, popularized by Gottfried Keller. The word gained further use during the First World War, as the equivalent of the English "push," or "going over the top," from one's trenches into battle. The derived verb aufputschen remains common in Standard German for "to incite", "to excite", in political or in doping contexts.

== See also ==
- Restoration (Switzerland)
- Züriputsch
- Freiämtersturm

== Sources ==
- Der Ustertag im Spiegel seiner Zeit. Festschrift zur 150. Wiederkehr des 22. Novembers 1830. Uster, 1980.
