= Heusser =

Heusser is a surname. Notable people with the surname include:

- Andreas Heusser (born 1976), Swiss artist and curator
- Ed Heusser (1909–1956), American basketball player
- Felipe Heusser (born 1980), Chilean activist
- Jakob Heusser (1862–1941), Swiss industrialist
- Johanna Spyri (née Heusser) (1827-1901), Swiss novelist
- Roger Heusser (born 1941), American Civil Servant
- Matthew Heusser (born 1976), American Technology Consultant, Author and Entrepreneur/Investor
- Meta Heusser-Schweizer (1797–1876), Swiss poet
