= Revolution of 1830 =

The Revolution of 1830 can be:

- The July Revolution in France leading to a constitutional monarchy lasting until the revolutions of 1848
- The Belgian Revolution in the United Kingdom of the Netherlands leading to the creation of Belgium
- The November Uprising in Poland, a failed attempt to overthrow Russian rule

== See also ==
- Revolutions of 1830
