= Year of Revolutions =

Year of Revolutions may refer to:

- Revolutions of 1830
- Revolutions of 1848, often cited as The Year of Revolutions
- Protests of 1968
- Revolutions of 1989 and the fall of communism
- Arab Spring
