= Revolutions of 1830 =

Series of political upheavals in Europe

Liberty Leading the People by Eugène Delacroix commemorates the July Revolution in France.

The Revolutions of 1830 were a revolutionary wave in Europe which took place in 1830. It included two "romantic nationalist" revolutions, the Belgian Revolution in the United Kingdom of the Netherlands and the July Revolution in France along with rebellions in Congress Poland, Italian states, Portugal and Switzerland. It was followed, 18 years later, by another and much stronger wave of revolutions known as the Revolutions of 1848.

== Romantic revolutions ==
The romantic nationalist revolutions of 1830, both of which occurred in Western Europe, led to the establishment of similar constitutional monarchies, called popular monarchies. Louis-Philippe I became "King of the French" on 31 July 1830, and Leopold I became "King of the Belgians", on 21 July 1831.

=== In France ===
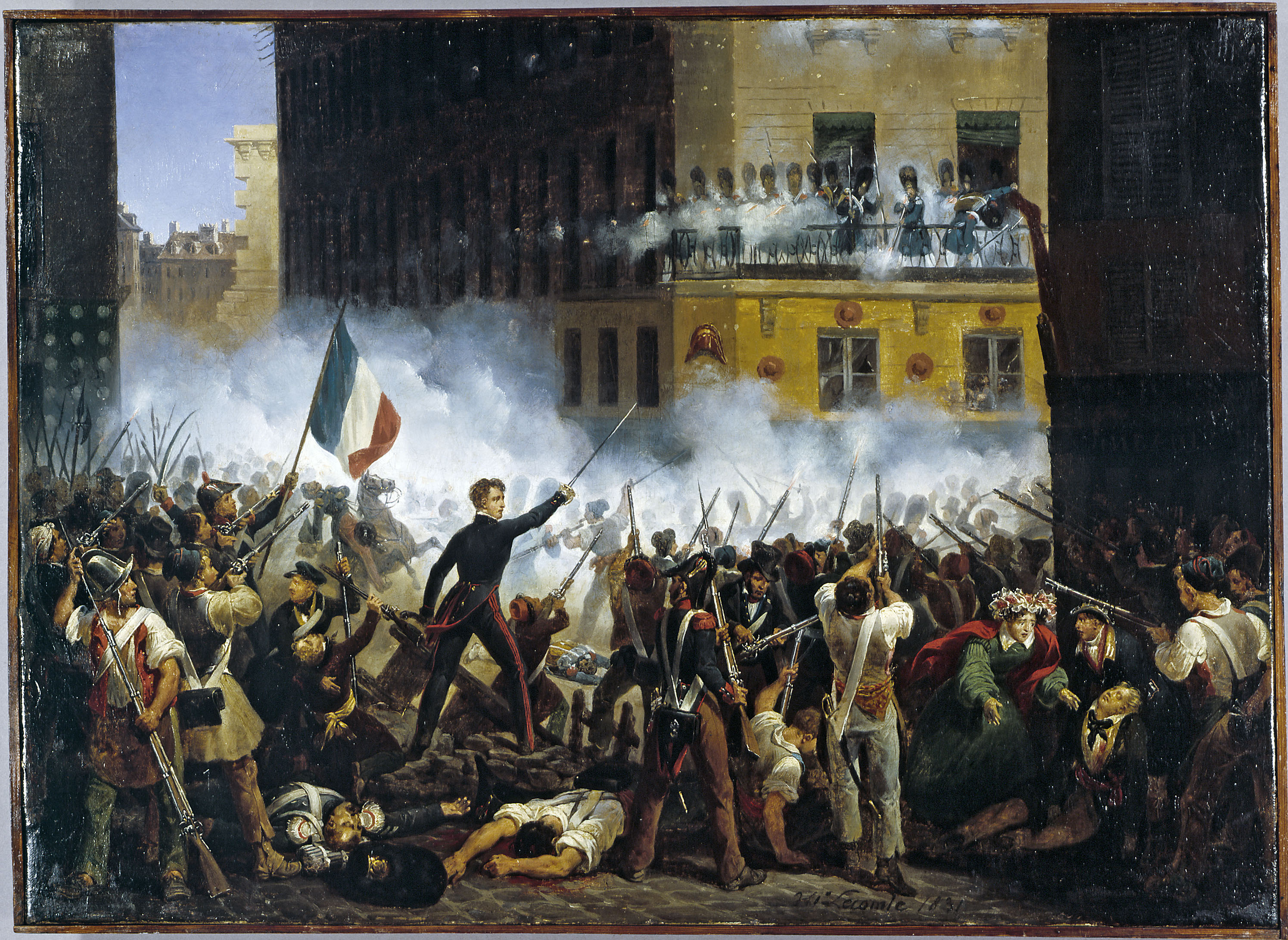
Depiction of the fighting in Paris during the French Revolution of 1830

In France, the July Revolution led to the overthrow of the Bourbon King, Charles X, whose family had been reinstated after the fall of the French Empire of Napoleon Bonaparte. In his place, Charles' cousin Louis-Philippe, Duke of Orléans was crowned as the first "King of the French". It marked the shift from one constitutional monarchy, the Bourbon Restoration, to another, the July Monarchy; the transition of power from the House of Bourbon to its cadet branch, the House of Orléans; and the substitution of the principle of hereditary right for popular sovereignty. Supporters of the Bourbons would be called Legitimists, and supporters of Louis Philippe Orléanists.

The French July Monarchy would last until the revolution of 1848.

=== In Belgium ===
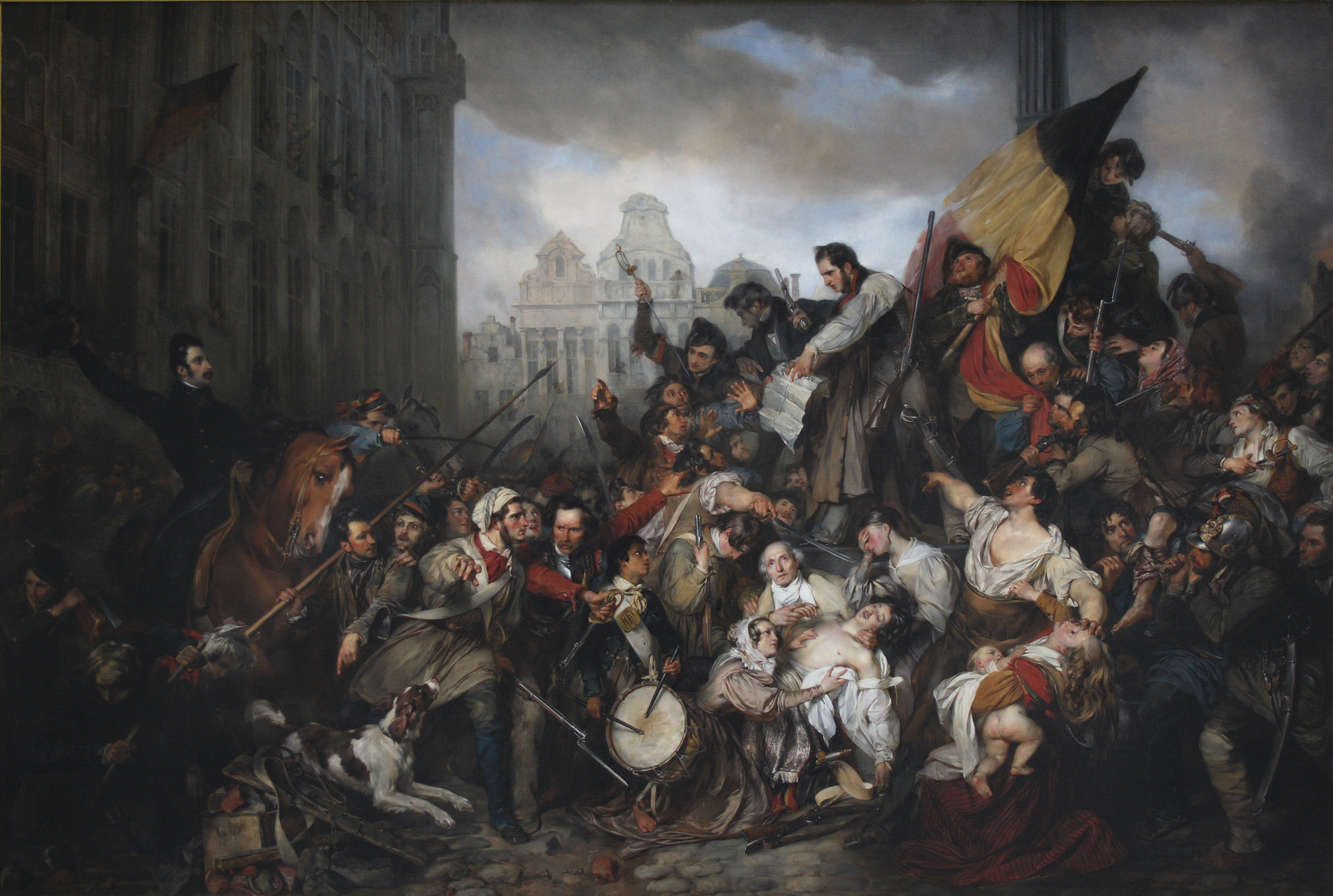
Episodes from September Days of 1830 by Gustaf Wappers (1834) is the most celebrated depiction of the Belgian Revolution

The Belgian Revolution broke out on 25 August 1830. The short-term influence was the outbreak of the French July Revolution one month earlier: Belgium had been attached to the Kingdom of the Netherlands in 1815, and a Belgian Patriot movement had emerged, campaigning for a written constitution that would limit the powers of the Dutch absolute monarchy and enshrine fundamental civil rights; the French July Revolution appeared to them to be an equivalent struggle to their own. Within this context, the staging of a nationalistic opera (La muette de Portici) in Brussels led to a minor insurrection among the capital's bourgeoisie, who sang patriotic songs and captured some public buildings in the city. This early revolutionary group was swelled by a large number of urban workers. The following day, the revolutionaries began flying their own flag, clearly influenced by that of the Brabant Revolution of 1789. To maintain order, several bourgeois militia groups were formed. The situation in Brussels led to widespread unrest across the country. King William I rejected his son's advice to negotiate with the rebels, forcing them towards a more radical, pro-independence stance, and sent a large military force to Brussels to suppress the insurrection.

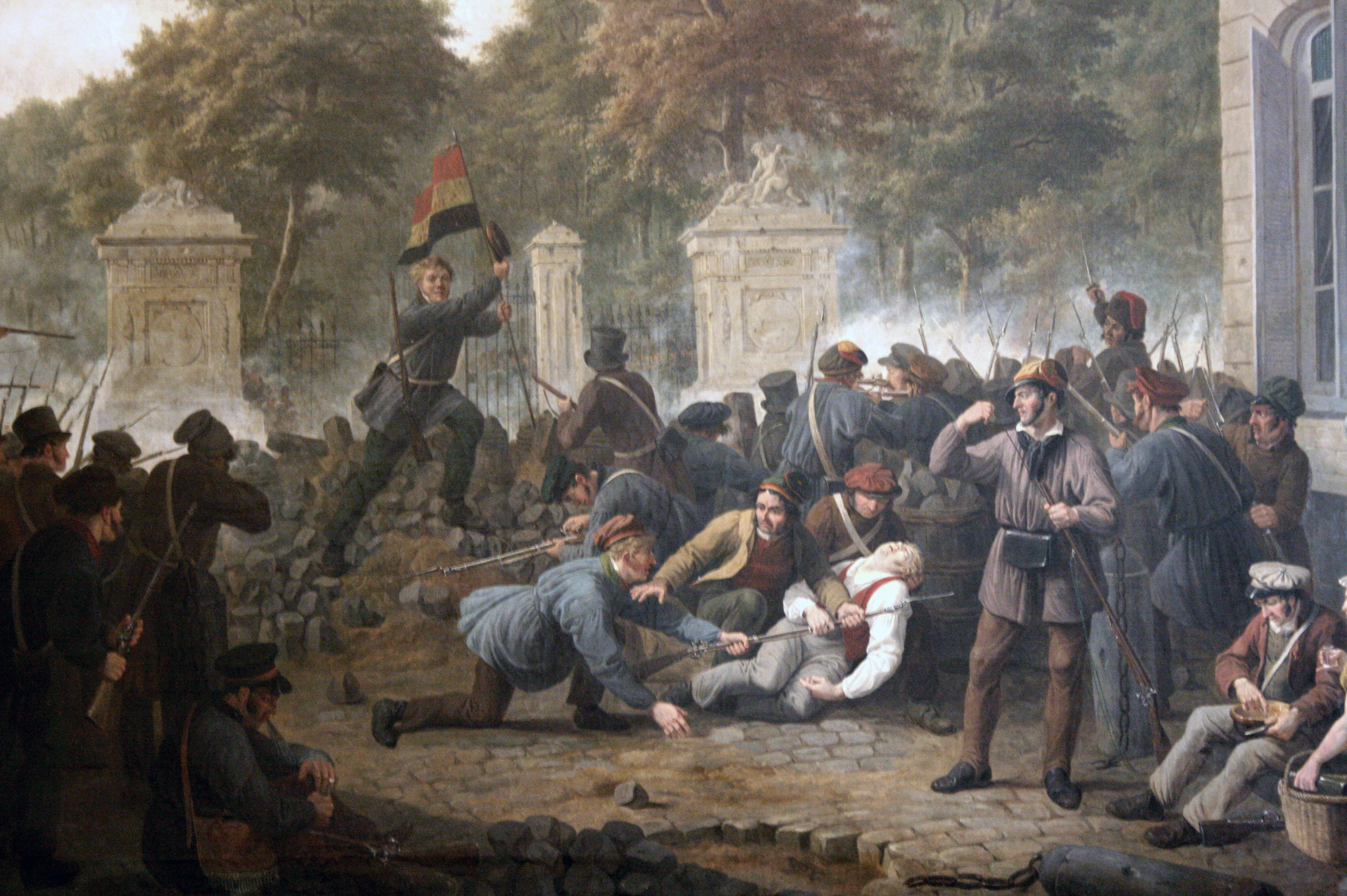
Belgian rebels at the barricades during the street fighting in Brussels in September 1830

Between 23 and 28 September 1830, heavy fighting took place between Dutch forces and Brussels revolutionaries, who were reinforced by small contingents from across the country. The Dutch were eventually forced to retreat. In the aftermath of the failed attack and concurrent mass desertions of Belgian soldiers from the Dutch army, the revolution spread around Belgium. Dutch garrisons were pushed out of the area, until only Antwerp and Luxembourg remained occupied. The Provisional Government of Belgium, led by Charles Rogier, was formed on 24 September and Belgian independence was officially proclaimed on 4 October while work began on creating a constitution. In December, international governments at the Conference of London recognized the independence of Belgium and guaranteed its neutrality. The Dutch, however, only recognized Belgium's independence and the terms of the Conference in 1839. The Constitution, finally adopted in 1831, protected individual freedoms and was considered as a template for future liberal constitutionalists around the world. It also created a popular monarchy ("King of the Belgians", rather than "King of Belgium") to ward off fears of mob rule associated with republicanism in the aftermath of the French Revolution of 1789. The first King of the Belgians, Leopold I, was crowned in July 1831.

== Other revolutions and uprisings ==
=== In Italy ===
By 1830, revolutionary sentiment in favour of a unified Italy began to experience a resurgence, and a series of insurrections laid the groundwork for the creation of one nation along the Italian peninsula.

The Duke of Modena, Francis IV, was an ambitious man, and he hoped to become king of Northern Italy by increasing his territory. In 1826, Francis made it clear that he would not act against those who subverted opposition toward the unification of Italy. Encouraged by the declaration, revolutionaries in the region began to organize.

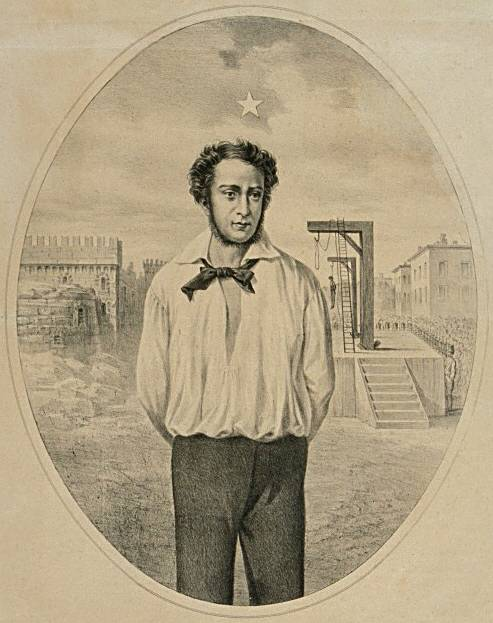
Ciro Menotti

The new French king Louis-Philippe had promised revolutionaries such as Ciro Menotti that he would intervene if Austria tried to interfere in Italy with troops. Fearing he would lose his throne, Louis-Philippe did not, however, intervene in Menotti's planned uprising. The Duke of Modena abandoned his Carbonari supporters, arrested Menotti and other conspirators in 1831, and once again conquered his duchy with help from the Austrian troops. Menotti was hanged, and the idea of a revolution centered in Modena faded.

At the same time, other insurrections arose in the Papal Legations of Bologna, Ferrara, Ravenna, Forlì, Ancona and Perugia. These successful revolutions, which adopted the tricolore in place of the Papal flag, quickly spread to cover all the Papal Legations, and their newly installed local governments proclaimed the creation of a united Italian nation. The revolts in Modena and the Papal Legations inspired similar activity in the Duchy of Parma, where the tricolore flag was adopted. The Parmese duchess Marie Louise left the city during the political upheaval.

The rebellious provinces planned to unite as the Italian United Provinces which prompted Pope Gregory XVI to ask for Austrian and French help against the rebels. Prince Metternich warned Louis-Philippe that Austria had no intention of letting Italian matters be, and that French intervention would not be tolerated. Louis-Philippe sent a naval expedition to occupy Ancona (until 1838) and arrested Italian patriots living in France.

In the spring of 1831, the Austrian army began its march across the Italian peninsula, slowly crushing resistance in each province that had revolted. This military action suppressed much of the fledgling revolutionary movement, and resulted in the arrest of many radical leaders.

=== In Poland ===
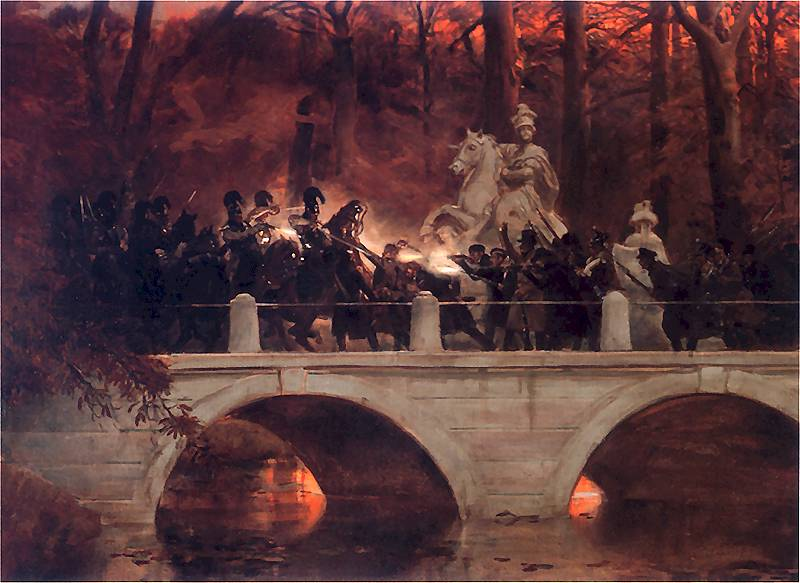
Russian forces clashing with Polish revolutionaries in Warsaw's Łazienki Park

Simultaneously in Congress Poland, the unsuccessful November Uprising against Nicolas I of the Russia occurred. The uprising began on 29 November 1830 in Warsaw when the young Polish officers from the local Army of Congress Poland's military academy revolted, led by lieutenant Piotr Wysocki. They were soon joined by large segments of Polish society, and the insurrection spread to the territories of Lithuania, western Belarus, and the right-bank of Ukraine, all of which had been part of pre-partition Poland.

Despite some local successes, the uprising was eventually crushed by a numerically superior Imperial Russian Army under Ivan Paskevich. Tsar Nicholas I decreed that henceforth Poland was an integral part of Russia, with Warsaw little more than a military garrison, and its university was closed.

=== In Brazil and Portugal ===
The outbreak of the revolutions in Europe provided the opportunity for Brazilian liberals to expel Emperor Pedro I from the country, where he had played an authoritarian role since the struggle for independence. Given his commitment to Portuguese liberals, he took their side in the Portuguese Civil War.

=== In Switzerland ===
In Switzerland, the rural population was poor and uneducated while politically and economically under the control of the nearby cities. During the French-controlled Helvetic Republic in 1798 the ideas of freedom and equality spread. The medieval idea of different laws for city citizens and countryside peasants was overthrown. However, in 1803 the Helvetic Republic collapsed and was replaced by the Act of Mediation which struck a compromise between the Ancien Regime and a republic. In the following years, even the limited freedoms under the Act were undermined and following Napoleon's defeat in 1813 the Act was overturned. In the Restoration, which started in 1814, the new constitution reduced the representation of rural areas in the cantonal councils.

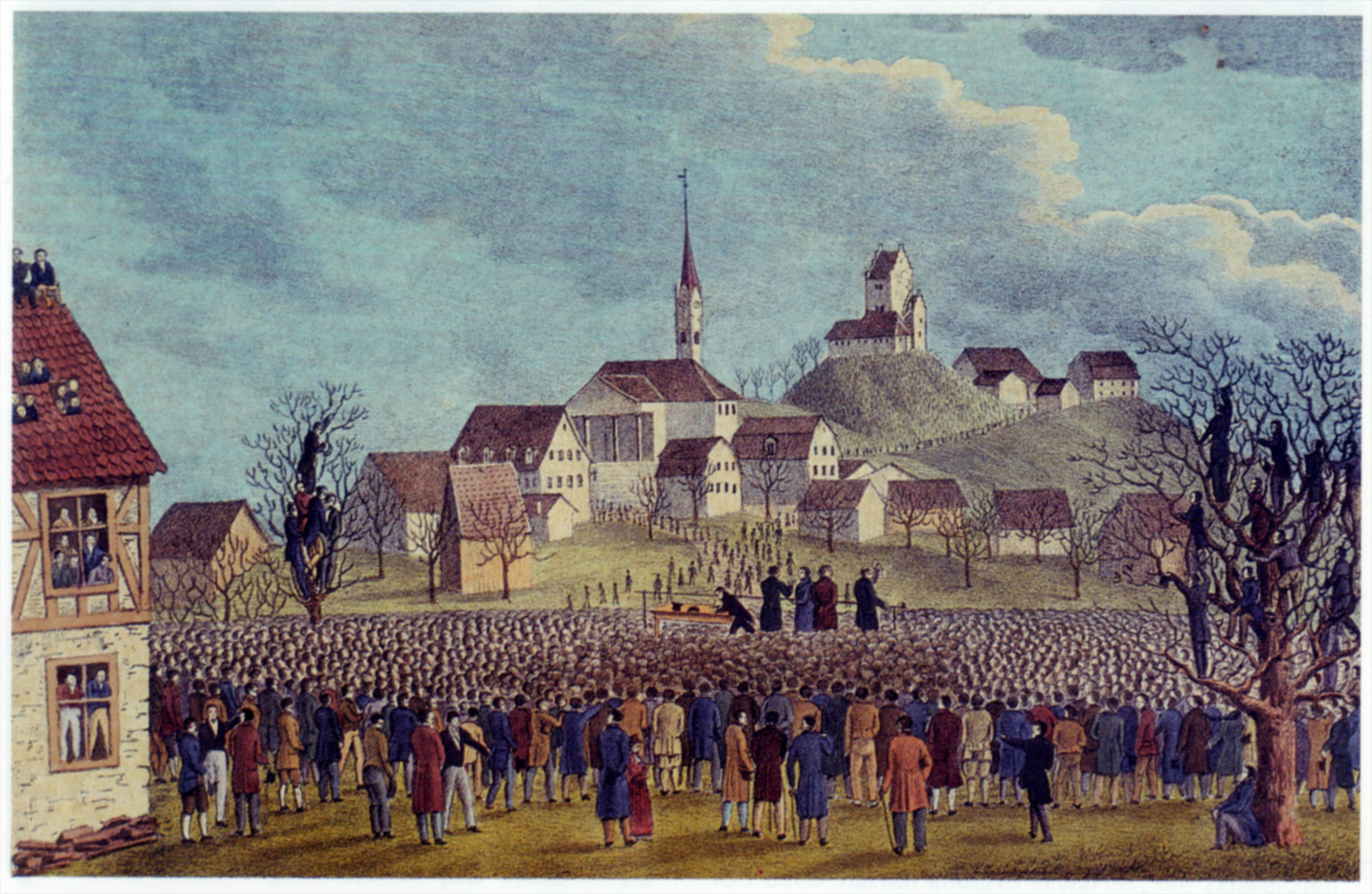
The Ustertag meets near Zurich on 22 November 1830.

Following the French July Revolution in 1830, a number of large assemblies were held calling for new cantonal constitutions. As each canton had its own constitution, the assemblies in each canton addressed different specifics, but they all had two main issues. First, they called for peacefully adjusting the constitutions by adjusting the way seats in local legislatures and the Tagsatzung were allocated. In particular they objected to what they saw as the over-representation of the cantonal capital in the government. Secondly, they sought a way to amend the constitution. Very few cantons even had a way to amend or modify the constitutions, and none of them allowed citizens' initiatives to be added.

The first assembly was held near Weinfelden in Thurgau in October and November 1830, followed in November by meetings in Wohlenschwil, Aargau then Sursee, Lucerne and finally the Ustertag near Uster in Zurich. In December there were three assemblies in the Canton of St. Gallen in Wattwil, Altstätten and St. Gallenkappel as well as in Balsthal in Solothurn. The final assembly was held in Münsingen in Bern in January 1831.

The speeches and articles reporting on the assemblies were widely distributed and became very popular. The crowds were generally well behaved and orderly. For example, in Wohlenschwil it was reported that they met "in unexpectedly quiet attitude with decency and perfect order". Even in Aargau and St. Gallen, where the crowd marched through the streets of Aarau (known as the Freiämtersturm) and St. Gallen, the protest march was peaceful. Following the assemblies and marches, cantonal governments quickly gave in to the demands of the assemblies and amended their constitutions.
