= Italian United Provinces =

1831 republic in parts of Italy

Italian United Provinces Province Unite Italiane
- 1831
- Flag Coat of arms
- Capital: Bologna
- Common languages: Italian
- Government: Parliamentary republic
- Legislature: Provisional Assembly
- History
  - Established: 5 February 1831
  - Disestablished: 26 April 1831
- Currency: Roman scudo Parman lira Modenese Thaler
Preceded by
Papal States
Duchy of Parma
Duchy of Modena
Succeeded by
Papal States
Duchy of Parma
Duchy of Modena

United Italian Provinces or Italian United Provinces (Italian: Provincie Unite Italiane, in modern Italian: Province Unite Italiane) was a short-lived unrecognized state (a Republic) that was established in 1831 in some territories of the Papal States (Romagna, Marche and Umbria) and in the Duchies of Parma and Modena.

It existed from 5 February (following the popular uprising in Bologna, when the temporal power of the Pope and the Emilian Dukes were declared to be revoked) until 26 April, the day the city of Ancona was taken by the Austrian troops.

== Government ==
The Constitution of the Italian United Provinces was adopted on March 4 by a national Assembly. The executive power was vested in:

- Giovanni Vicini, President
- Leopoldo Armaroli, Minister of Justice
- Terenzio Mamiani della Rovere, Minister of the Interior
- Lodovico Sturiani, Minister of Finance
- Cesare Bianchetti, Minister of Foreign Affairs
- General Pier Damiano Armandi, Minister of War and Navy
- Pio Sarti, Minister of Police
- Francesco Orioli, Minister of Public Education

== History ==
The revolutionary government of the Italian United Provinces fell on 26 April 1831. It was brought down by Austrian troops sent to the aid of the Pope and the Emilian Dukes.
