= Jakob Heusser-Staub =

Swiss industrialist (1862–1941)

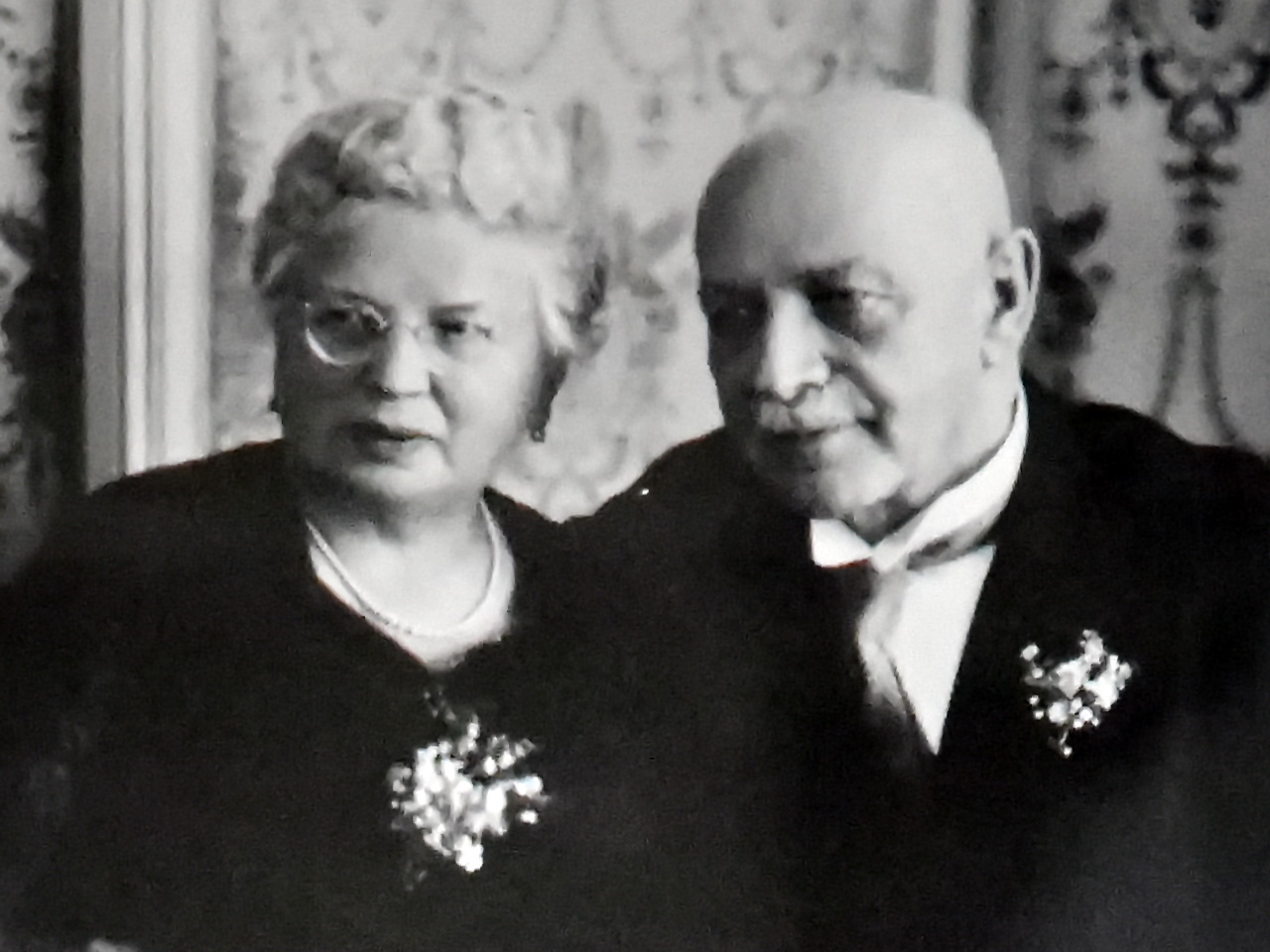
- Berta and Jakob Heusser-Staub in 1939
- Born: 3 March 1862; Irgenhausen, Switzerland
- Died: 23 August 1941 (aged 79); Uster, Switzerland
- Monuments: Uster Castle respectively Heusser-Staub-Stiftung
- Occupations: Swiss industrialist and philanthropist
- Years active: 1897–1941
- Spouse: Berta Heusser-Staub

Jakob Heusser-Staub (3 March 1862 – 23 August 1941 as Jakob Heusser) was a Swiss industrialist and philanthropist. Born and raised in the village of Irgenhausen, Heusser-Staub made Uster his home. With the support of his wife, Berta, he founded the Heusser-Staub foundation.

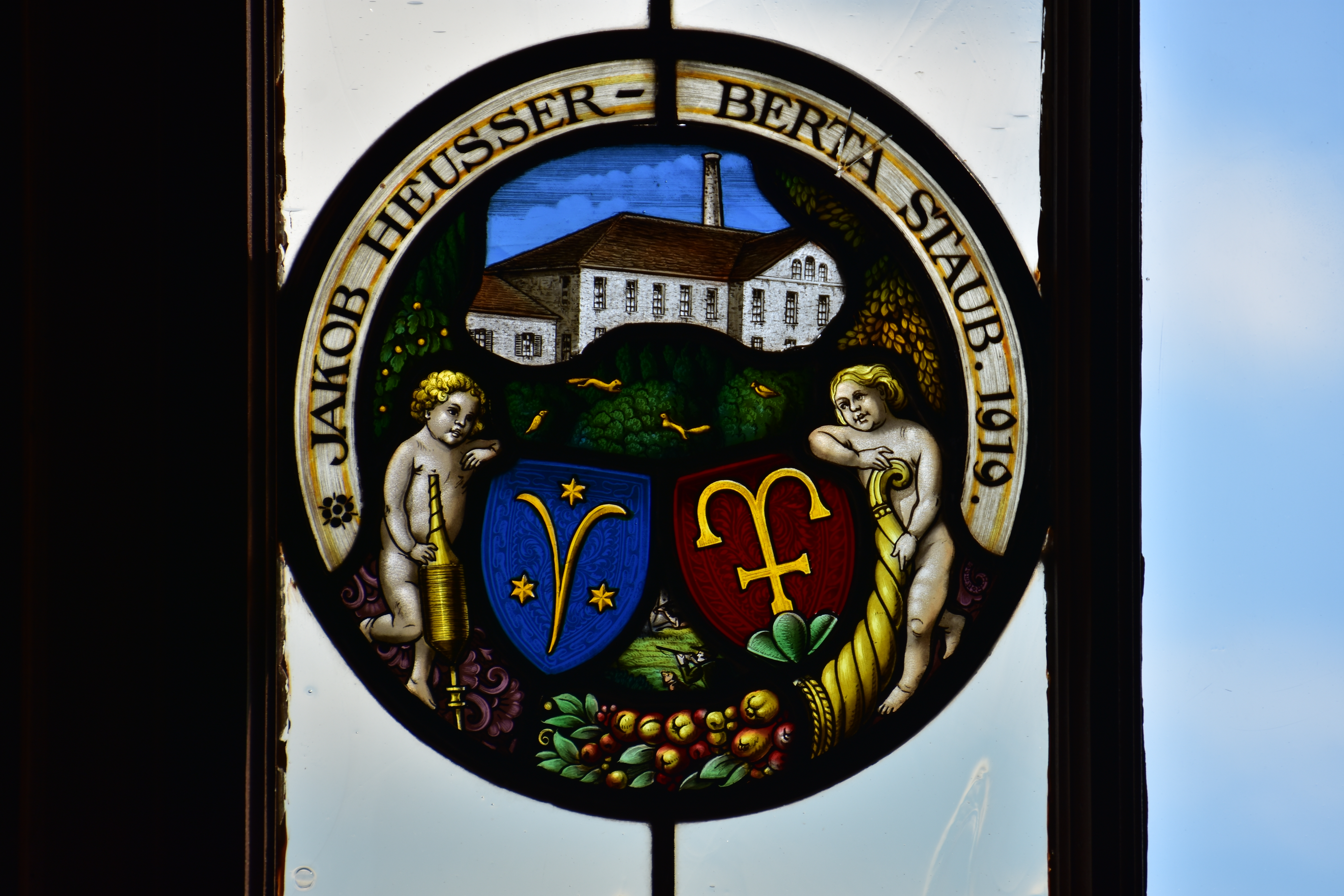
stained glass window dedicated to Berta and Jakob Heusser-Staub in the Uster Castle

== Early life and education ==
Born in the hamlet of Irgenhausen in the municipality of Wetzikon, he was the son of Luise née Schellenberg and Caspar. He attended Sekundarschule (pre-college level) in Wetzikon and was a citizen of Pfäffikon. From 1877 to 1879, he attended the Industrial School in Zürich. Afterwards he received practical and commercial training at his father's business. His father, Caspar Heusser (1836–1910), was a cotton manufacturer who sold his products in Kempten and the surrounding area.

His professional success enabled him to purchase the Spinnerei Stauber in Kempten (with 1,200 spindles) in 1869 and to introduce mechanical weaving with 36 machines. In 1883 he bought a cotton mill in Bubikon (6,000 spindles, 80 workers), where he also added a weaving factory. Heusser expanded to Winterthur and St. Gallen, leaving a considerable fortune.

He lived from 1880 to 1882 in Lyon and from 1882 to 1883 in England to gain professional experience. From 1883 to 1897 he served as trade merchant in his father's business in Bubikon, from 1897 independently as his own factory.

== Becoming an industrialist ==
In 1900, Jakob Heusser became a textile industrialist in the city of Uster, the industrial centre of the region. He purchased the Boller mill in Uster, and developed it to produce quality yarns.

In 1910 he inherited the paternal factories and in 1917 bought the spinning factory Huber in Uster, which he modernized in 1928. Beginning in 1919 Heusser held the majority share of the textile factory Schiesser AG, with factories in Radolfzell and Kreuzlingen, and in 1929 he gained control of the cotton spinning and weaving factory, Wettingen, which he also modernized. Moreover, Heusser was involved in the short-lived Swiss car factory Turicum. He acquired the majority of shares of the "Fabrik für Electrische Geräte" from Alfred Zellweger, the later Zellweger Uster AG.

Heusser was also involved in the "Aluminium Industrie AG" (now Alusuisse). He was a member of the board from 1924 to 1939, and from 1918 to 1939 he also sat on the board of "Maschinenfabrik Rieter". His involvement in the Terpena AG in the manufacturing of artificial camphor in the early 1930s was a financial fiasco, but in 1938 the activities of the spinning and weaving companies (except of "Spinnerei Wettingen") were summarized in the holding company "Heusser-Staub AG" and all other companies in the "Hesta" (He[usser]-sta[ub]) holding.

During the interwar period Heusser became the most important industrialist of the Zürich Oberland region. In 1900 he employed about 60 workers and produced about ten tons of yarn per year. In 1950 there were 230 workers who produced about 50 to 60 tons of yarn per year.

== Philanthropist activities ==
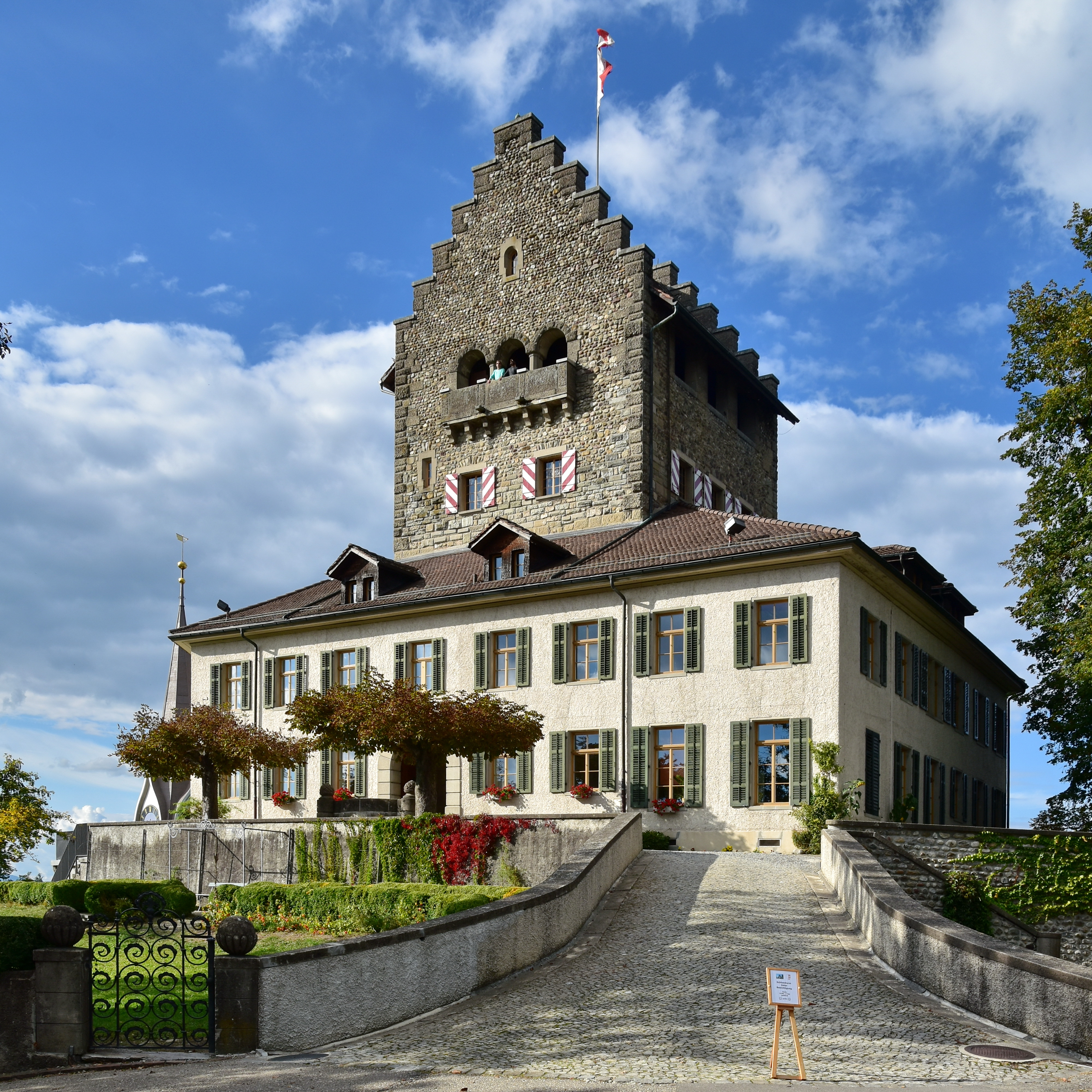
Uster Castle

Berta and Jakob Heusser-Staub supported projects of labour welfare. In 1917 the Uster Castle was acquired and renovated to house an agricultural and domestic management school. It was given to the citizenry of Uster to establish the "Heusser-Staub-Stiftung". In the same year, Heusser and his wife Berta were appointed honorary citizens of Uster.

== See also ==
- Uster Castle

== Literature ==
- Hans U. Rentsch: Jakob Heusser-Staub (1862-1941), in: Schweizer Pioniere der Wirtschaft und Technik, Volume 51, Verein für wirtschaftshistorische Studien, 1988.
