= Freiämtersturm =

1830 revolution in Aargau, Swiss

- Part of Swiss revolutions of 1830
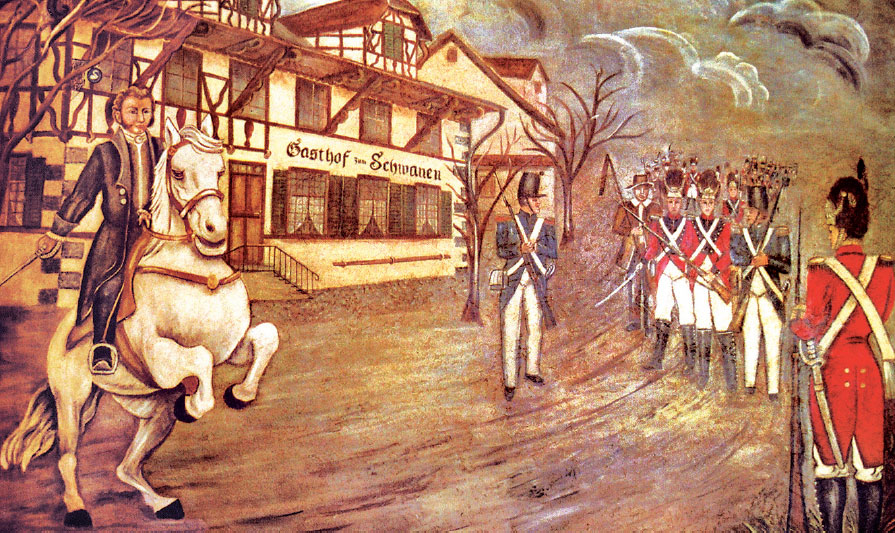
- Heinrich Fischer assembles his volunteers on the morning of 5 December 1830
Date	6 December 1830
Location	near Aarau, Canton of Aargau, Switzerland
Result	Decisive, bloodless Freie Ämter victory

Belligerents
Freie Ämter militia	Aargau

Commanders and leaders
Johann Heinrich Fischer	(Aargau) Johannes Herzog

Strength
6,000	Unknown

Casualties and losses
0	0

The Freiämtersturm in December 1830 was a bloodless revolution in the Swiss canton of Aargau. The dissatisfied rural population of the Freie Ämter region in Aargau marched on the cantonal capital of Aarau to demand changes in the cantonal constitution. The Freiämtersturm, together with other uprisings in 1830–31 led to the end of the Restoration period and the beginning of the liberal Regeneration period. The changes during the Regeneration led to the creation of the Federal State in 1848.

== Background ==
The rural population of the Freiämter were poor and uneducated while politically and economically under the control of the cities. During the French controlled Helvetic Republic in 1798 the ideas of freedom and equality spread. The medieval idea of different laws for city citizens and countryside peasants was overthrown. However, in 1803 the Helvetic Republic collapsed and was replaced by the Act of Mediation which struck a compromise between the Ancien Regime and a Republic. In the following years, even the limited freedoms under the Act were undermined and following Napoleon's defeat in 1813 the Act was overturned. In the Restoration, which started in 1814, the new constitution reduced the representation of rural areas in the cantonal councils.

By 1830 the region was also experiencing great economic difficulties. After years of growth, the Freiämter straw industry experienced a major crisis. Many workers feared for their economic future. Adding to this concern, a poor harvest in late summer led many to worry about the possibility of starvation. While the constitution of the Aargau was relatively liberal for the time, the increasing power of the city aristocrats and diminishing power for the rural population added to the unrest in the Freiämter. Then, the July Revolution in France showed that the people could successfully force the government to change.

== Attempts at peaceful resolution ==
Johannes Herzog, the cantonal president, ruled the Canton with a strict hand. He made enemies of virtually every group in the Canton. Cynics said, in allusion to his style of government, that he was setting up a Duchy of Aargau. He was so divisive that two diverse groups, rural farmers and educated middle class "Liberals", joined together to oppose the current government. The "Liberals" called for a revision of the Cantonal Constitution, in order to have more say in the government and more freedoms. The farmers, on the other hand, accused the government of extravagance, nepotism and complained about high taxes. They knew very little about the constitution, rather they pushed for concrete things such as changes to military service or construction of roads.

On 12 September 1830 two young students, Johann Peter and Kaspar Leonz Bruggisser, rode to Lenzburg to attend a meeting that would draft a petition to the government. The foreign-educated lawyers at the meeting called for the convening of a Great Council to consider revisions to the constitution. As the meeting wore on, the movement developed a more aggressive approach and increasingly delegates called for an armed revolution.

Johann Heinrich Fischer belonged to the wealthy rural upper class and was the innkeeper at the Zum Schwanen Gasthof in Merenschwand. He was a friend of the Bruggisser brothers as well as a member of the Grand Council. During a meeting of the Grand Council, on 26 November 1830, he launched into an impassioned speech on the explosive mood in the Freiamt. When the president interrupted his speech, Fischer left the room stomping and reportedly shouted "The people themselves will show you what they want!"

== The uprising ==
On 4 December 1830, at the Sternen Gasthof in Wohlen, several prestigious Freiämter, including Fischer and both Bruggisser, met to discuss the situation. Fischer advocated raising a militia to break the political deadlock. However, the majority of those present refused this, as they wanted to pursue other legal ways to change. Back in Merenschwand, Fischer met with an angry rural population. They demanded immediate change. After an almost unanimous decision for the fighting, he sent messengers to the surrounding communities. The militia was to assemble on 6 December.

On the morning of 5 December, throughout the entire upper Freiamt, alarm bells rang, calling the militia out. Fischer hoped to force the assembly at Wohlen to go along with his plan. That evening he made the zum Sternen inn his temporary military headquarters, as he waited for the militia to assemble the next morning.

On the morning of 6 December, about 6,000 soldiers gathered on the broad field between Wohlen and Villmergen. They were quickly divided into companies and battalions. At the head of the army were about 2,000 uniformed and well armed soldiers, who were recently returned from mercenary service in France. Because of their red uniforms they were called Rotröckler or Red Coats. The rest of the army was made up of simple farmers without military training. Fischer, the Bruggisser brothers and other leaders held fiery speeches and urged the troops to discipline. Any unnecessary bloodshed should be prevented, they ordered.

Fischer sent a detachment to Seengen, and then on to Seon and Gränichen, while he led the main body to Lenzburg. The troops' discipline and lack of violence was admired by both sides. Much too late the authorities reacted and ordered the army out to suppress the militia. However, moral was poor among the government troops and most units either did not move or deserted. For example, Lieutenant Sauerland, on the evening of 5 December had 250 soldiers from the Fricktal garrisoned at Küttigen. On the next morning he discovered that he only had 50 soldiers left. Whole companies expressed their solidarity with the insurgents and simply let them pass without conflict.

The situation became more dangerous in Lenzburg, where about 100 government soldiers formed to resist the militia, and brought their guns in position. The Freiämter militia ran toward the militia with wild battle cries, and the government soldiers broke and ran without firing a shot. By 6pm the militia entered Aarau and the commander of government troops surrendered without any resistance.

The militia surrounded government buildings, and the government quickly negotiated an end of the uprising. They agreed to a full revision of the constitution and all the other demands of the Freiämter militia.

Fischer returned to the Freiamt in triumph. Muri Abbey installed a memorial plaque in his honor. In his home town of Merenschwand he was met with liberty trees and a triumphal arch.

== Aftermath of the Freiämtersturm ==
While the government was not overthrown, the people had shown their strength. Heinrich Fischer, now called "General" Fischer, presided over the council that prepared a new constitution, which came into force in 1831. However, the needs of the Freiämter were quickly ignored. The joy of victory soon gave way to bitter disappointment. "General" Fischer's future life was dull. He fell out both with the Merenschwand people and with his family. In 1835 he moved to Lenzburg. In 1861 he was preparing to visit his daughter, but never arrived. What happened to him is still unknown. The two Bruggisser brothers made careers as chief justices, members of the Grand Council, and representatives of the Canton at the Confederation Tagsatzung.

The Freiämtersturm of 1830 and other assemblies of 1830-31 had a significant impact on the former Swiss Confederation. The political reforms that came after these assemblies ended the period known as the Restoration and led to the Regeneration period which led to the Constitution of 1848 and the creation of the Swiss federal state.

== See also ==
- Restoration (Switzerland)
- Ustertag
- Züriputsch
