= Uster Castle =

Schloss Uster
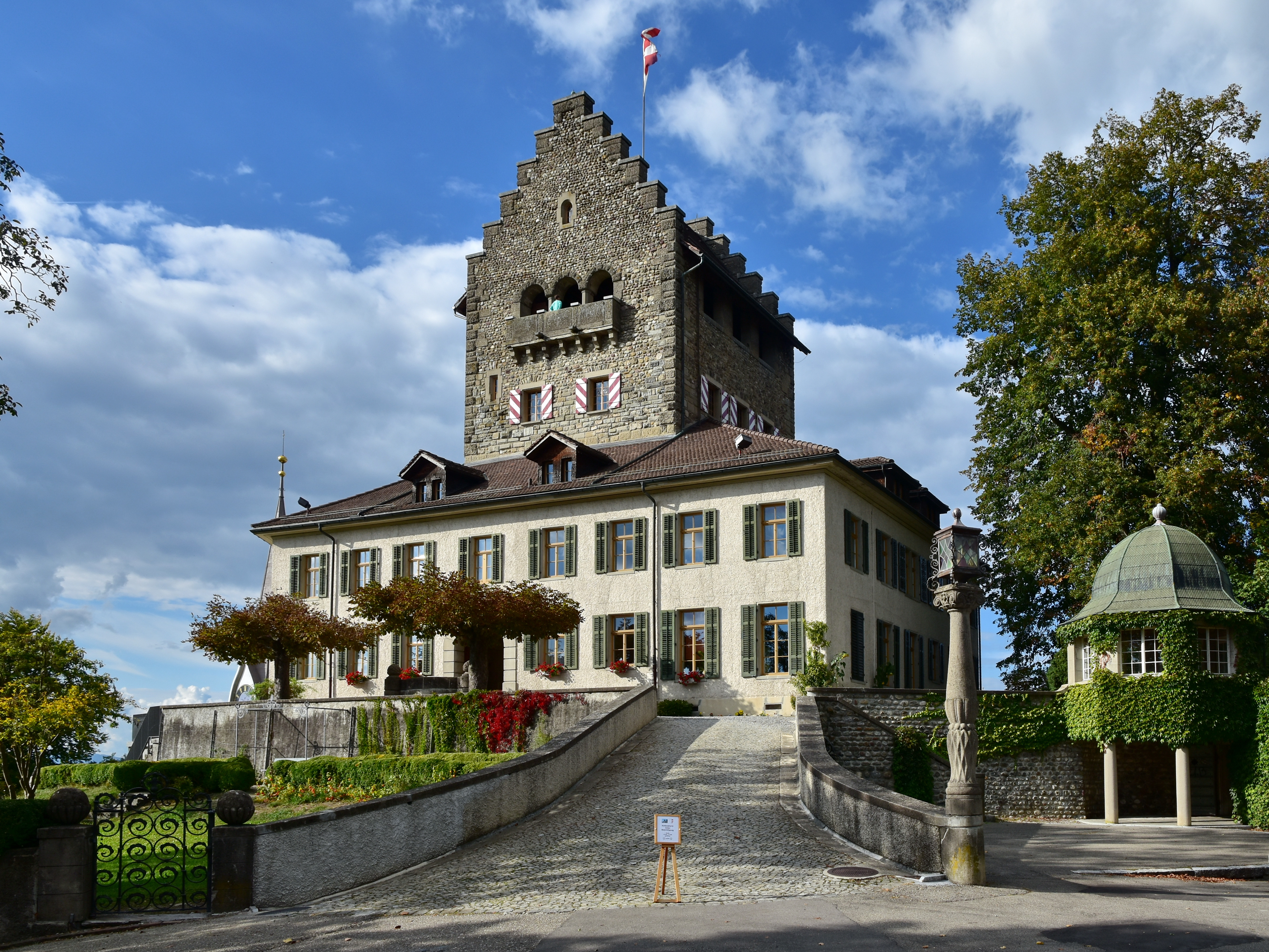
- the landmark of the city of Uster

- Location within Canton of Zürich Location within Switzerland

General information
- Architectural style: hill castle
- Classification: Historic monument
- Location: Uster, Switzerland
- Coordinates: 47.345493°N 8.717891°E
- Construction started: ~ 1200

Uster Castle (Swiss German: Schloss Uster also referred to Burg Uster) is a hill castle which was built probably around 1200 AD by the House of Rapperswil in the Swiss municipality of Uster in the Canton of Zürich. Since 1995 it houses a boarding school.

== Geography ==
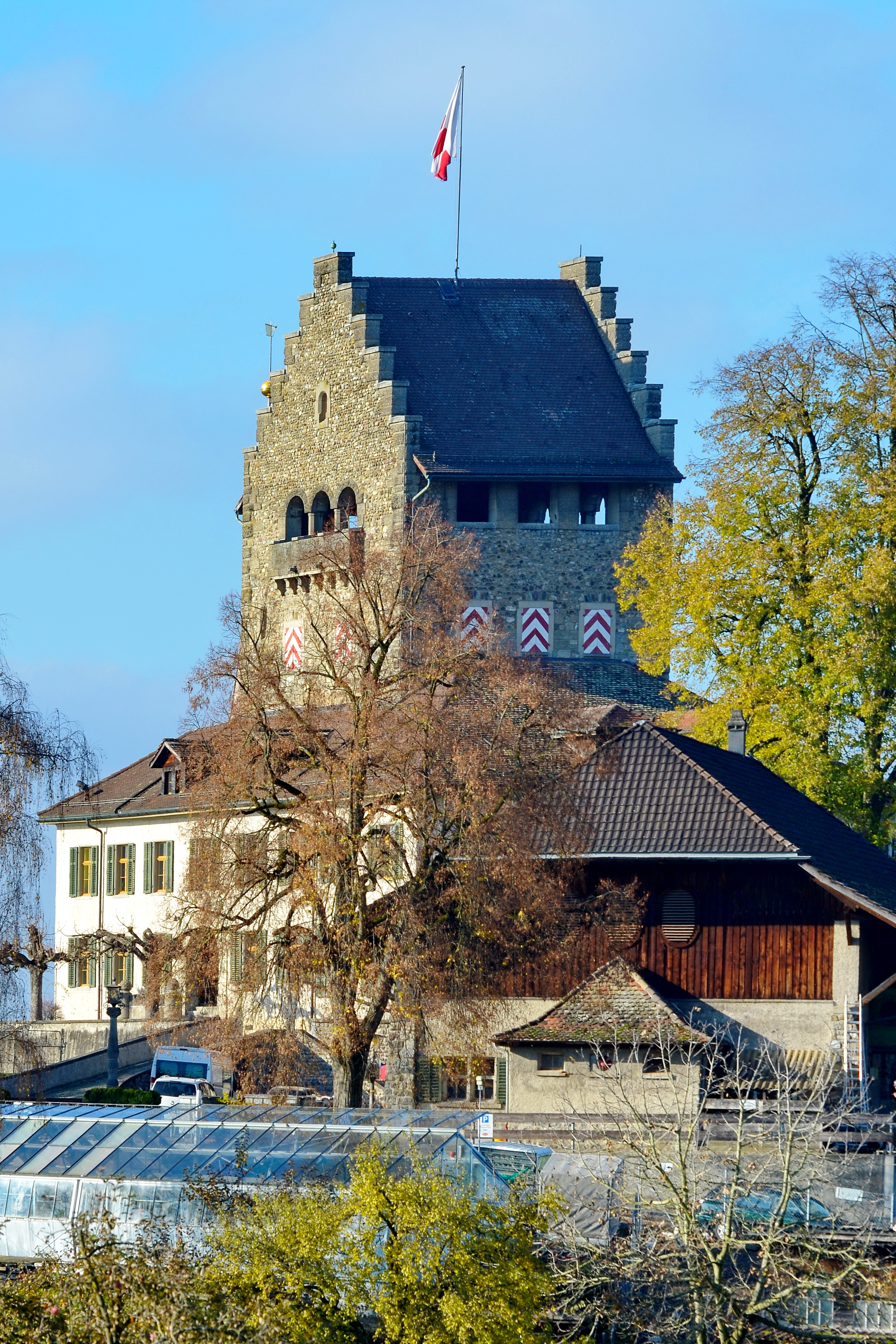
distant view as from towards Oberuster

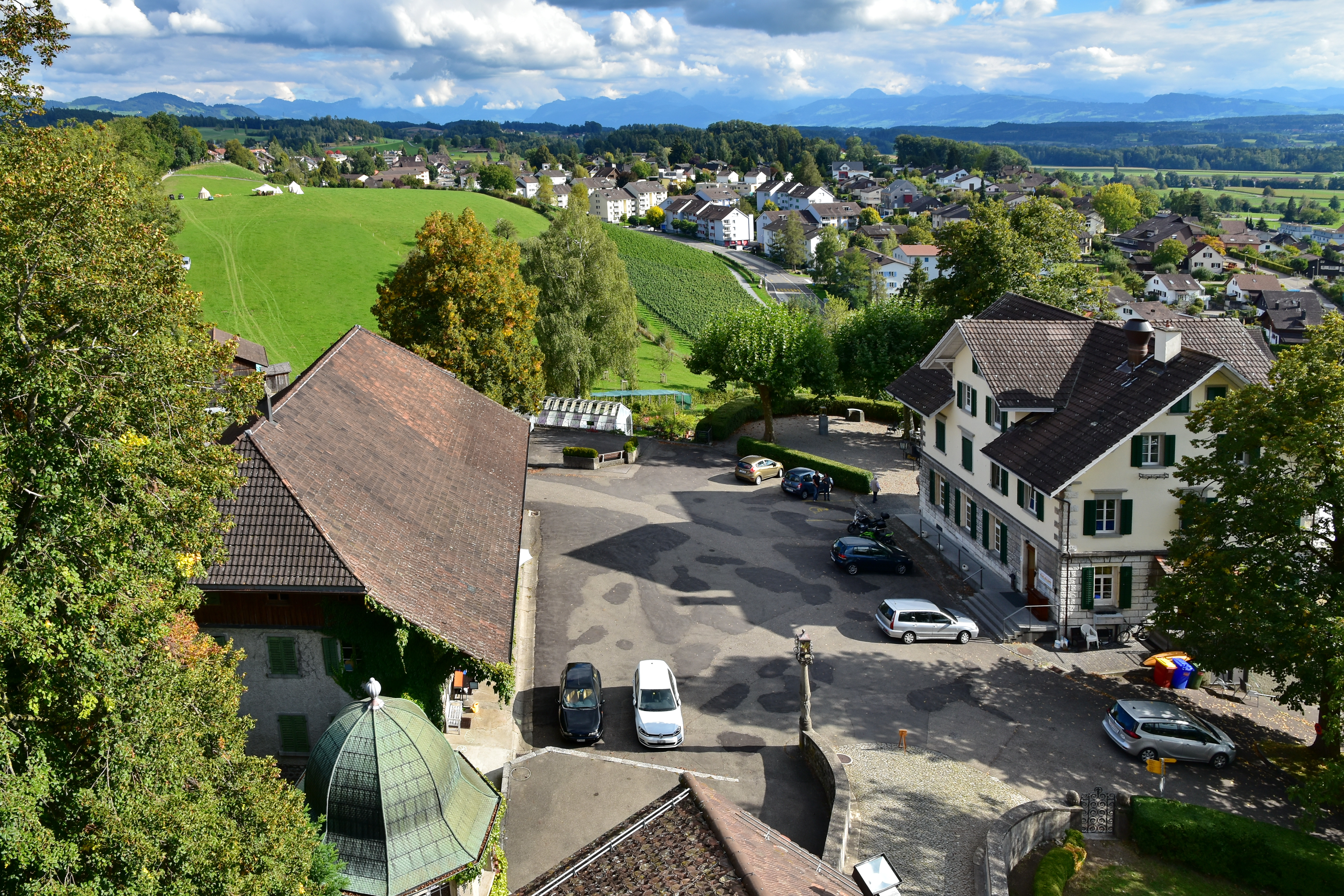
view from the tower to the castle's auxiliary buildings

The conspicuous tower of the castle was erected on a roughly 30 m (98 ft) high longish moraine hill between Oberuster and Kirchuster at an elevation of 496 m (1,627 ft) and comprises an area of about 30 metres (98 ft) from west to east and 35 metres (115 ft) from south to north. The castle is located above the Uster church in Kirchuster, a locality of the municipality of Uster in the Canton of Zürich. On its southwestern slope a vineyard is situated, overlooking the Greifensee towards the Pfannenstiel–Forch mountain chain.

== Architecture ==
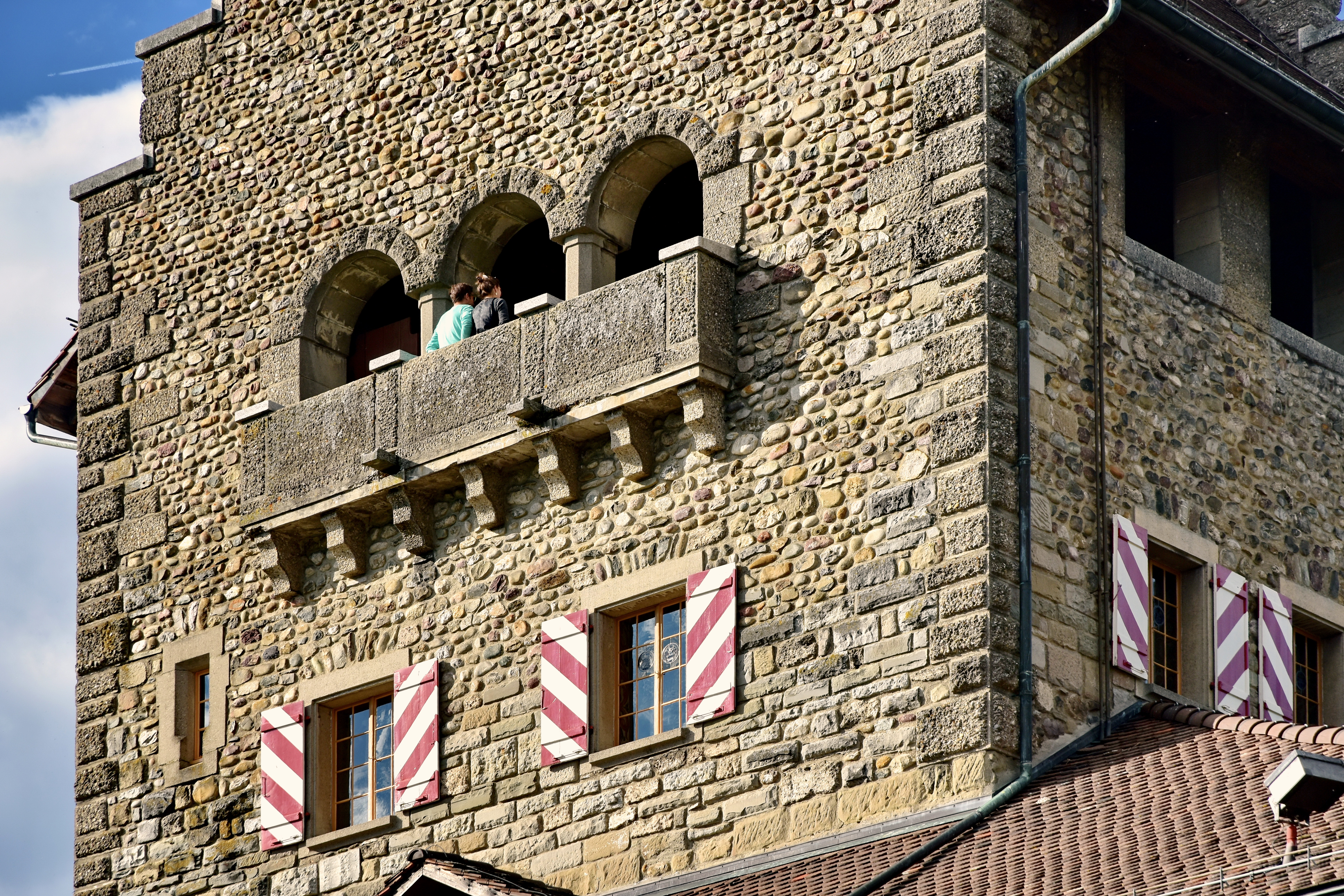
the stepgabled top of the tower

From the first construction phase, the lower section of the tower, up to the level of the upper floor of the today's boarding school's building around the tower base, is preserved, but never was scientifically examined, as well as the surrounding area of the plateau. Hence, the castle's history of origins is widely unknown, as well as the castle was never used as a seat of noble family there are just handful sealed documents referring to the castle's history.

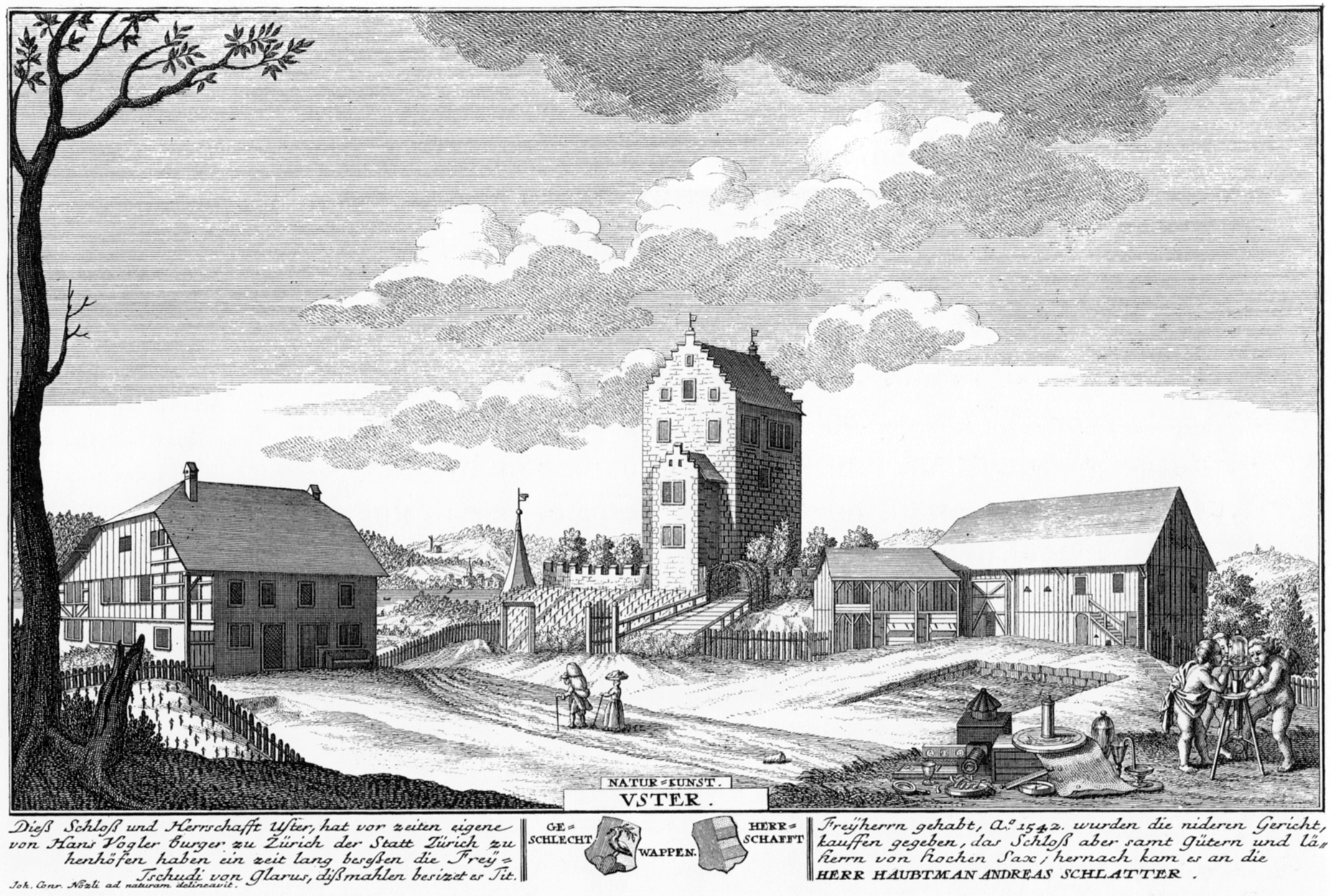
Eigentliche Vorstellung der Adelichen Schlösser im Zürich Gebieth, David Herrliberger: based on a drawing by Hans Conrad Nözli, the 1743 publication shows the castle tower and the staircase, separated by a deep trench that is crossed by a small wooden bridge, as well as the later restaurant Schloss Uster to the left and the present barn to the right.

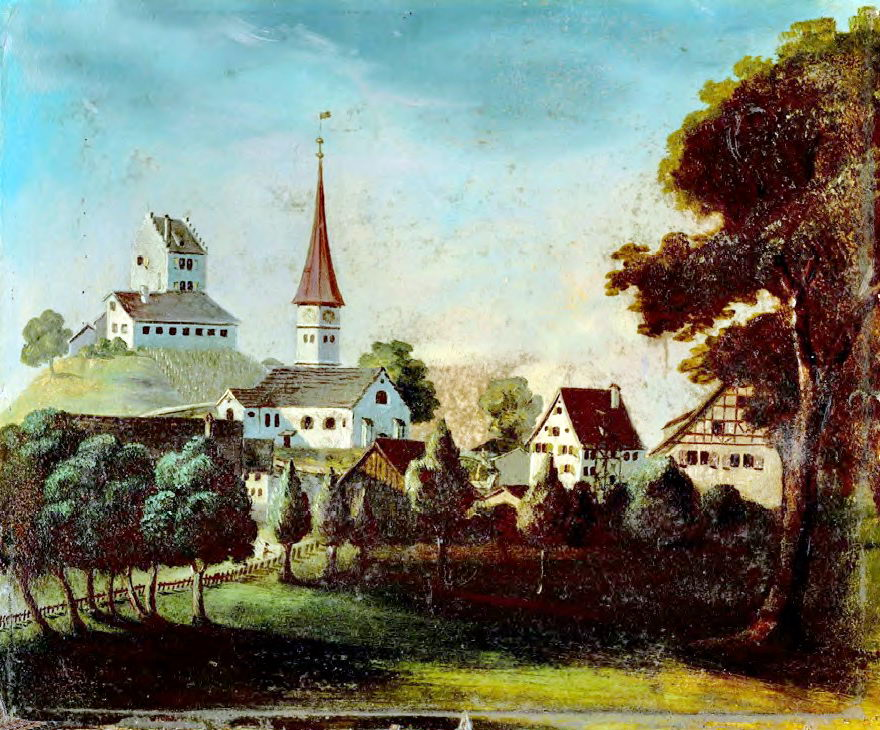
Uster castle and the St. Andreas Church before it was demolished in 1823, oil by unknown painter, Stadtarchiv Uster

The core of the present tower measures about 11.06 metres (36 ft) with about 3.4 metres (11 ft) thick sandstone walls which date back to around 1200 AD when on the hill, immediately behind the church of Uster, a keep was built. Whether the castle to 1267/68, as seen in pictures, consisted only of the tower and a small ring wall, or even the whole castle hill was covered by a castle-like structure, is unknown. In 1492 a fire destroyed the majority of the structures, the residential tower burned out completely, as documented by Johannes Stumpf in his chronicle: Anno domini 1492 verbran das Schloßz zu Ustri in Grund. Die Bonstetten ließend die ausgebrennten mauren lær ston und bauwtend ein schoen hauß von holtzwerck darnebend, meaning a wooden house was built next to the tower. Furthermore: Batt von Bonstetten initiated after the fire (Turm oben abwerffen und ein schoen geheüß … drauf setzen) to demolish the upper section of the tower plinth and to add a new, probably half-timbered structure. In 1526 the wooden house burned down, and the tower was rebuilt once more to 1529. This stage of construction can be seen in historical illustrations. Perhaps about 1663 the tower received a new superstructure with stepped gables, and on its south side a narrow staircase was built. At that time the fortification was also surrounded by a wall with battlements, separated by a trench from the eastern slope of the mountain chain towards Oberuster. Among the subsequent owners the castle was furthermore rebuilt. Captain Wilhelm Schärer from Zürich repaired the tower, and built two two-storey residential tracts on the south and south-east side of the tower in 1752/53, said to have been empty for a century. Exactly one hundred years later there was a further transformation: In 1852/53 Caspar Heer removed the stepped gable of the tower by replacing it by a "Belvedere" in the center of the tower's battlements. In addition, a two-storey building was erected around the tower, being the seat of the district administration, and the tower was rebuilt as a prison. The stepped gable was replaced by a straight final with battlements, and in the middle of the tower stump a narrow tower was placed.

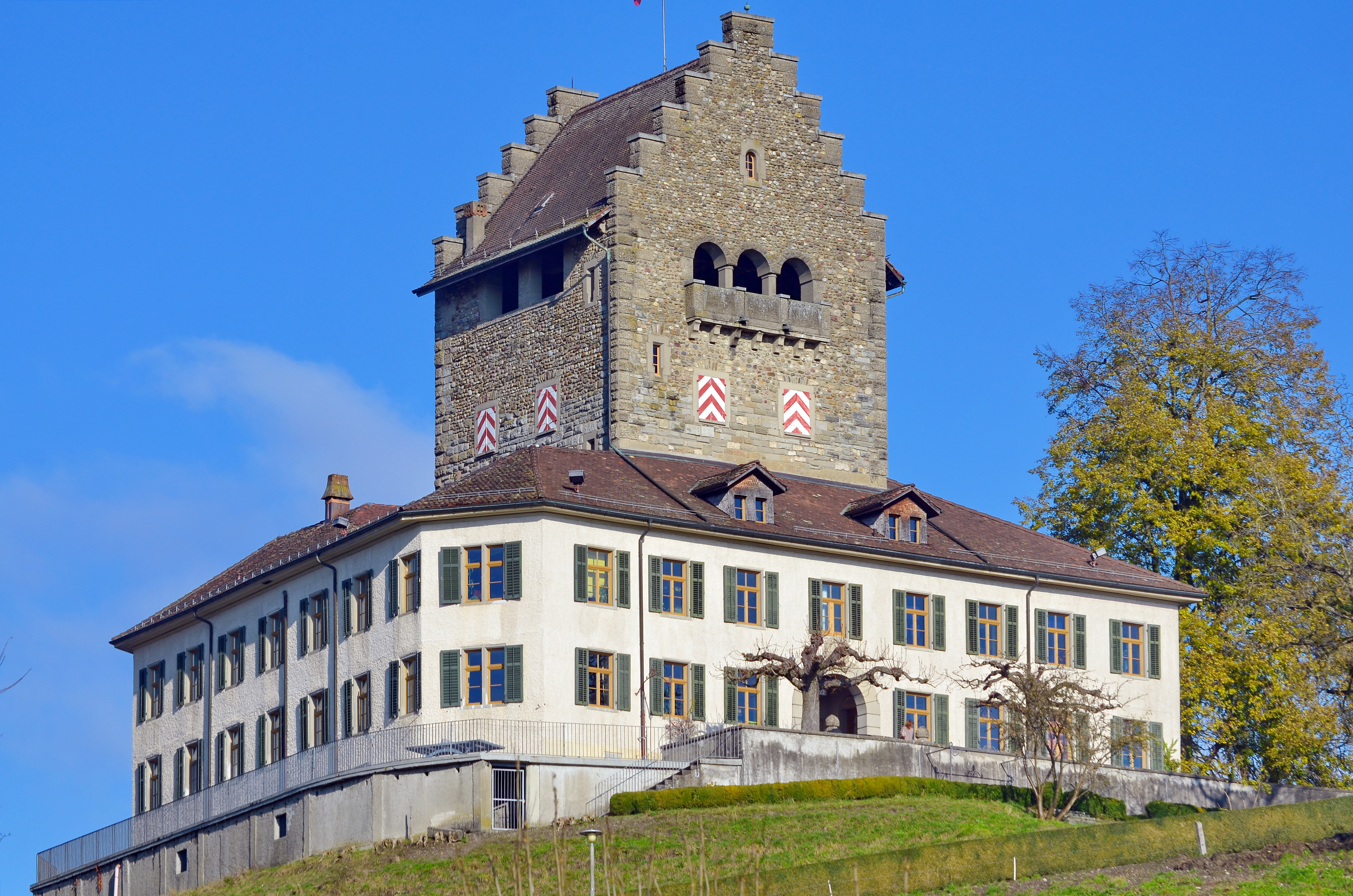
the building complex of the boarding school

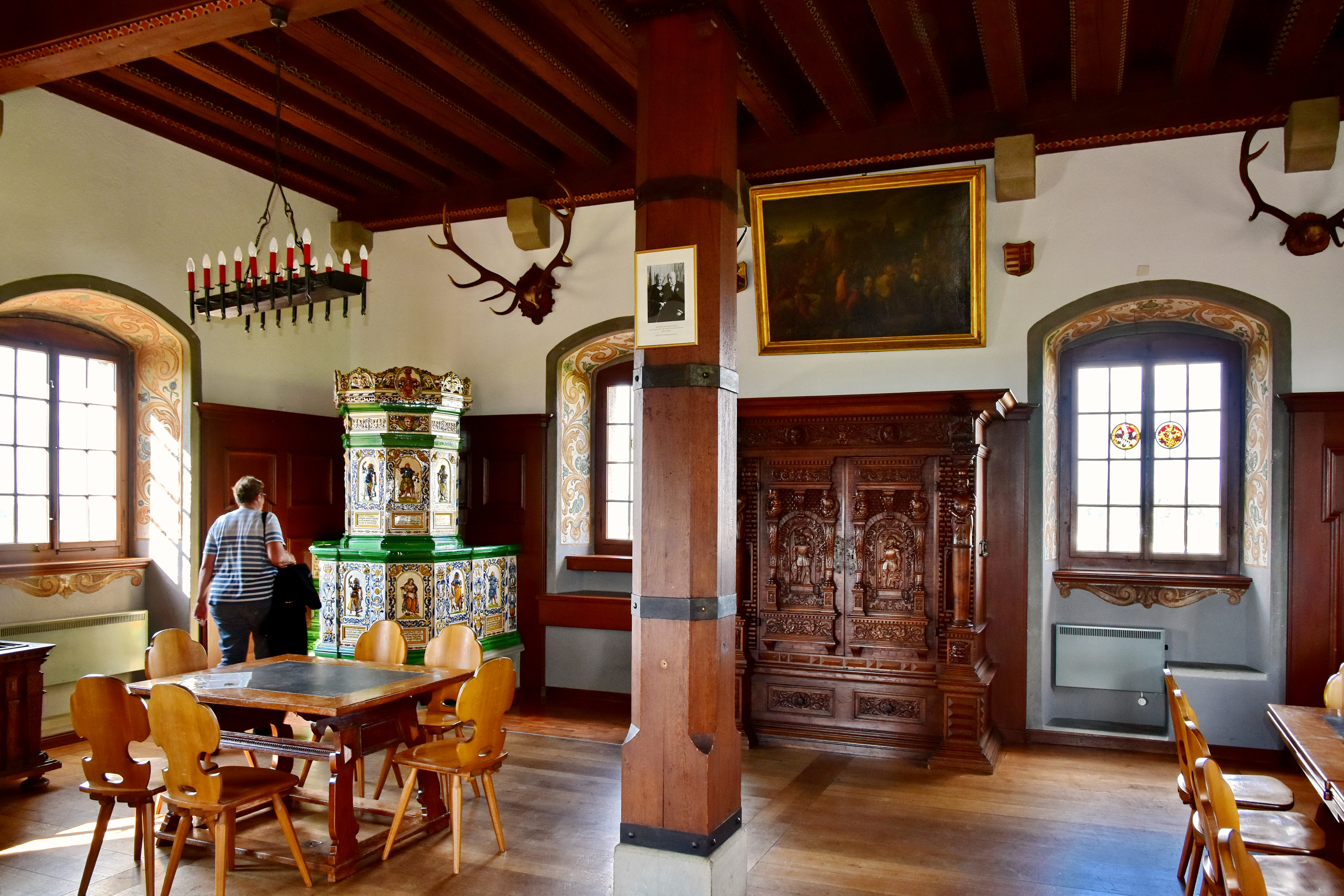
Rittersaal

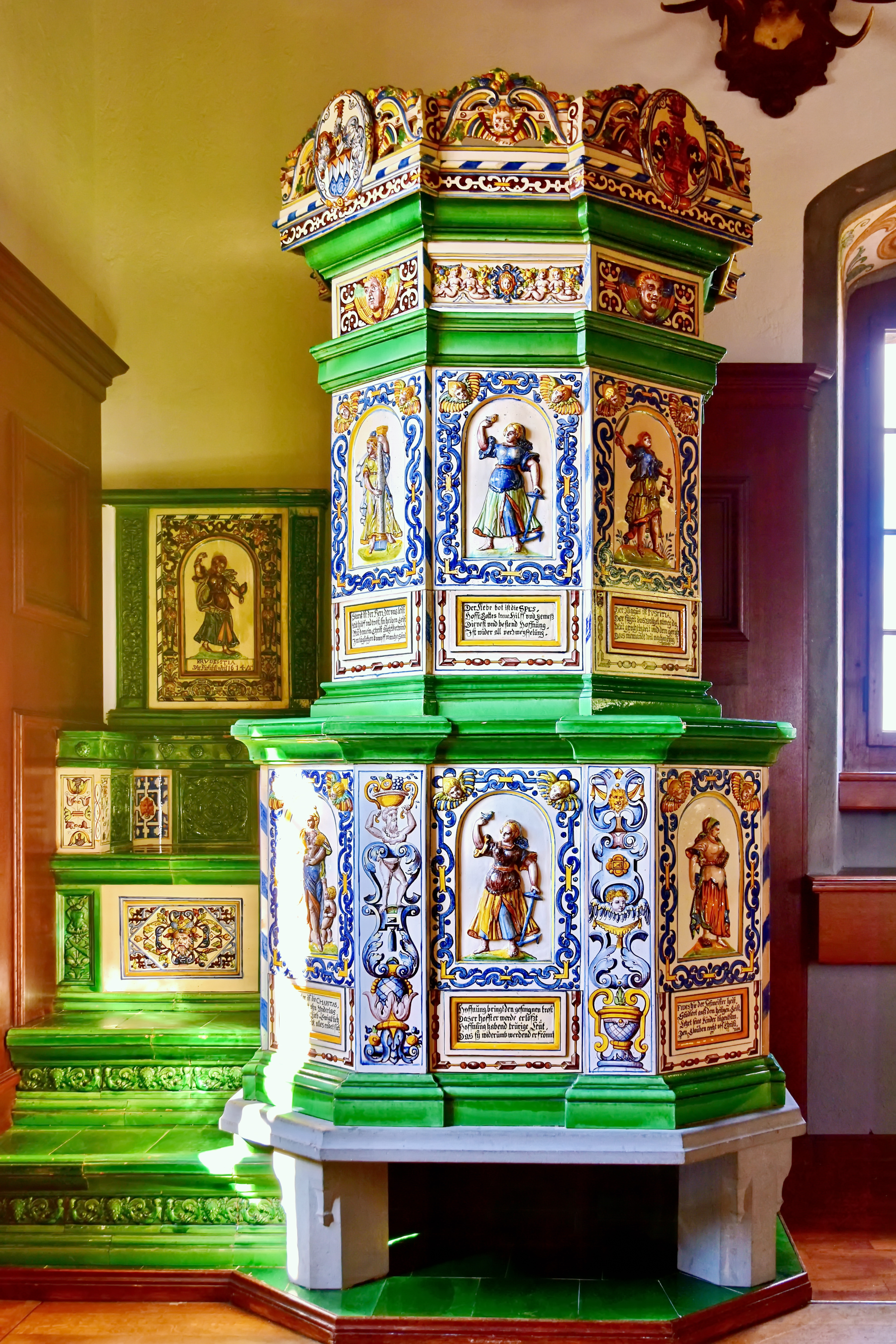

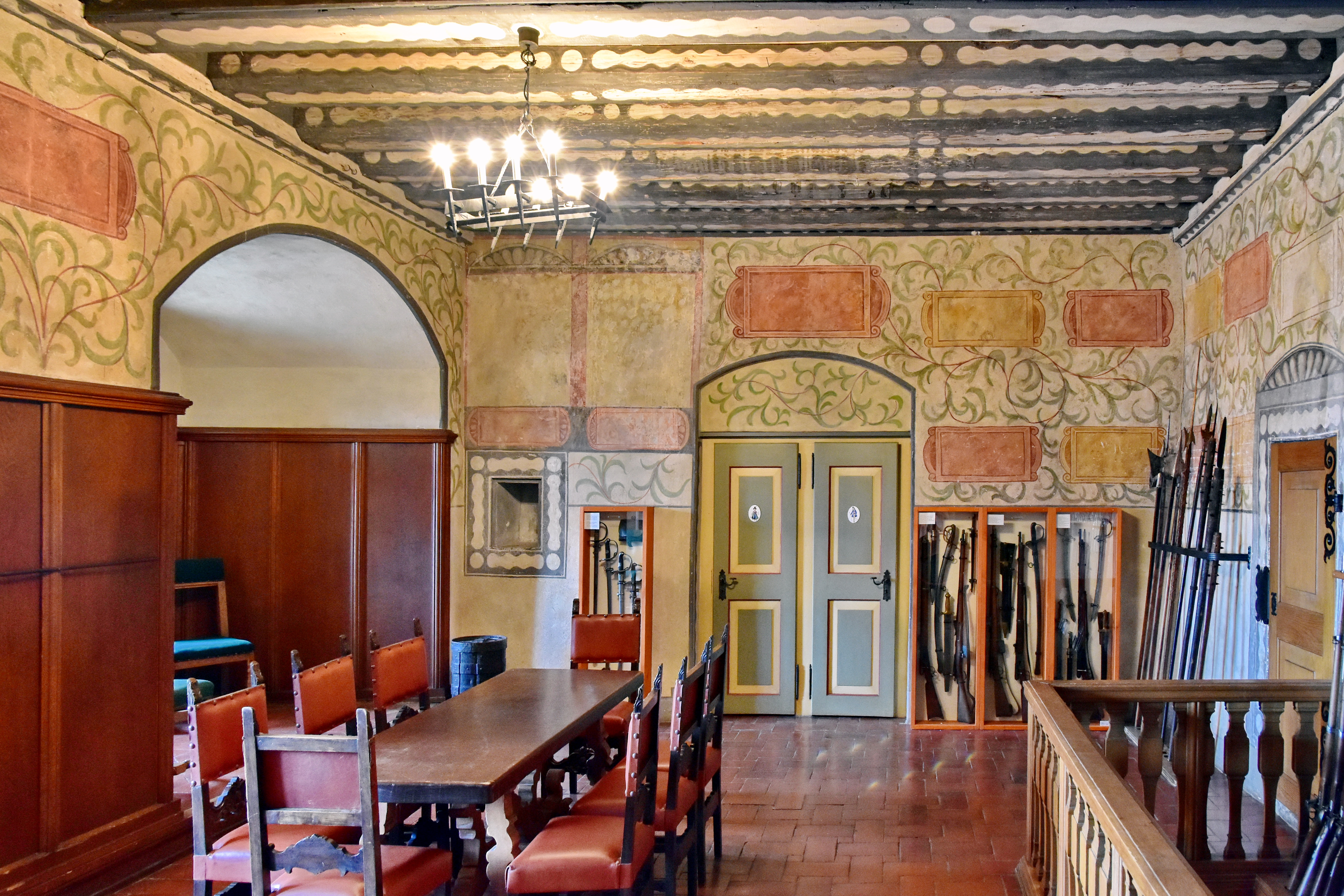
Waffenkammer

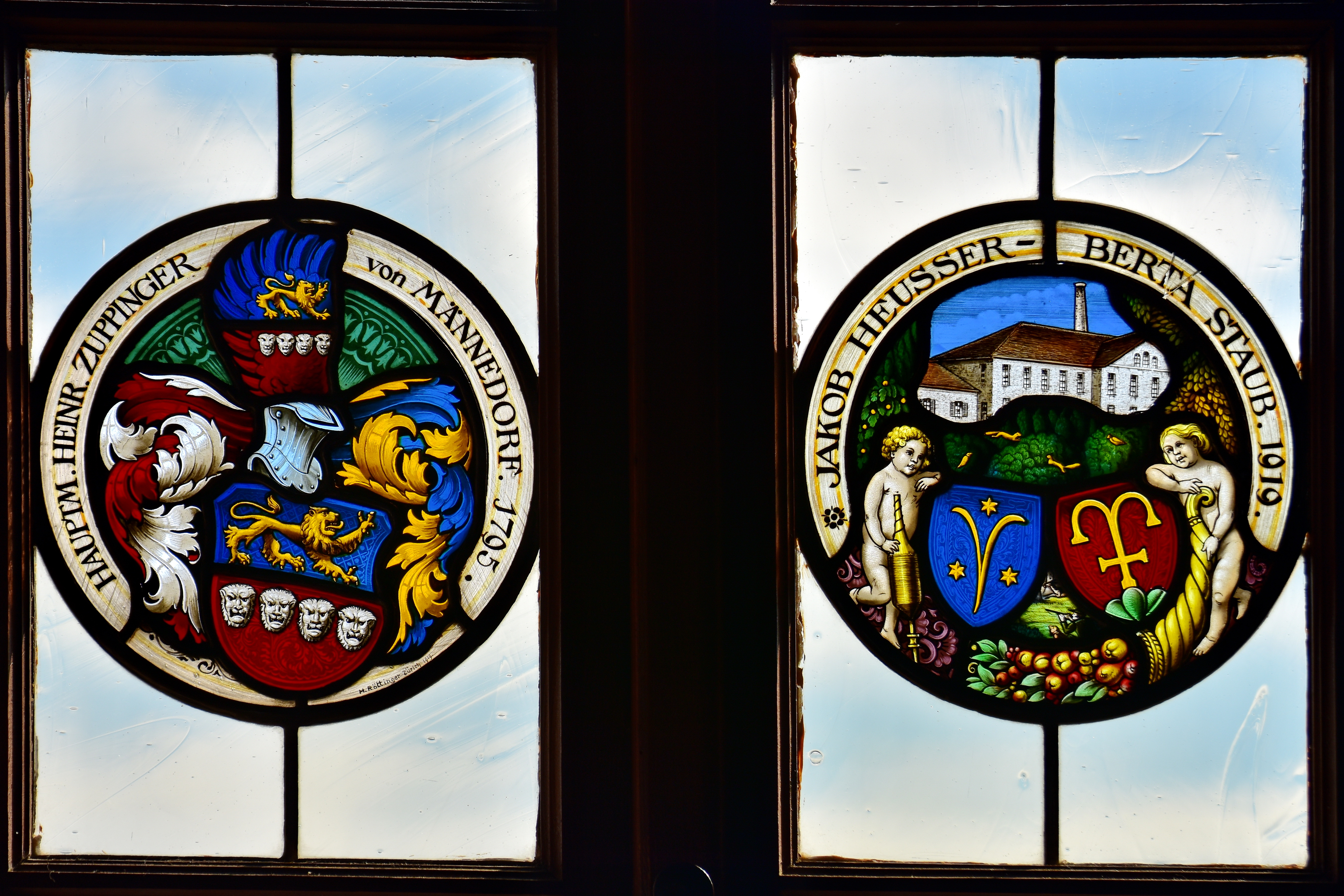
stained glass windows, the right section is dedicated to Berta and Jakob Heusser-Staub

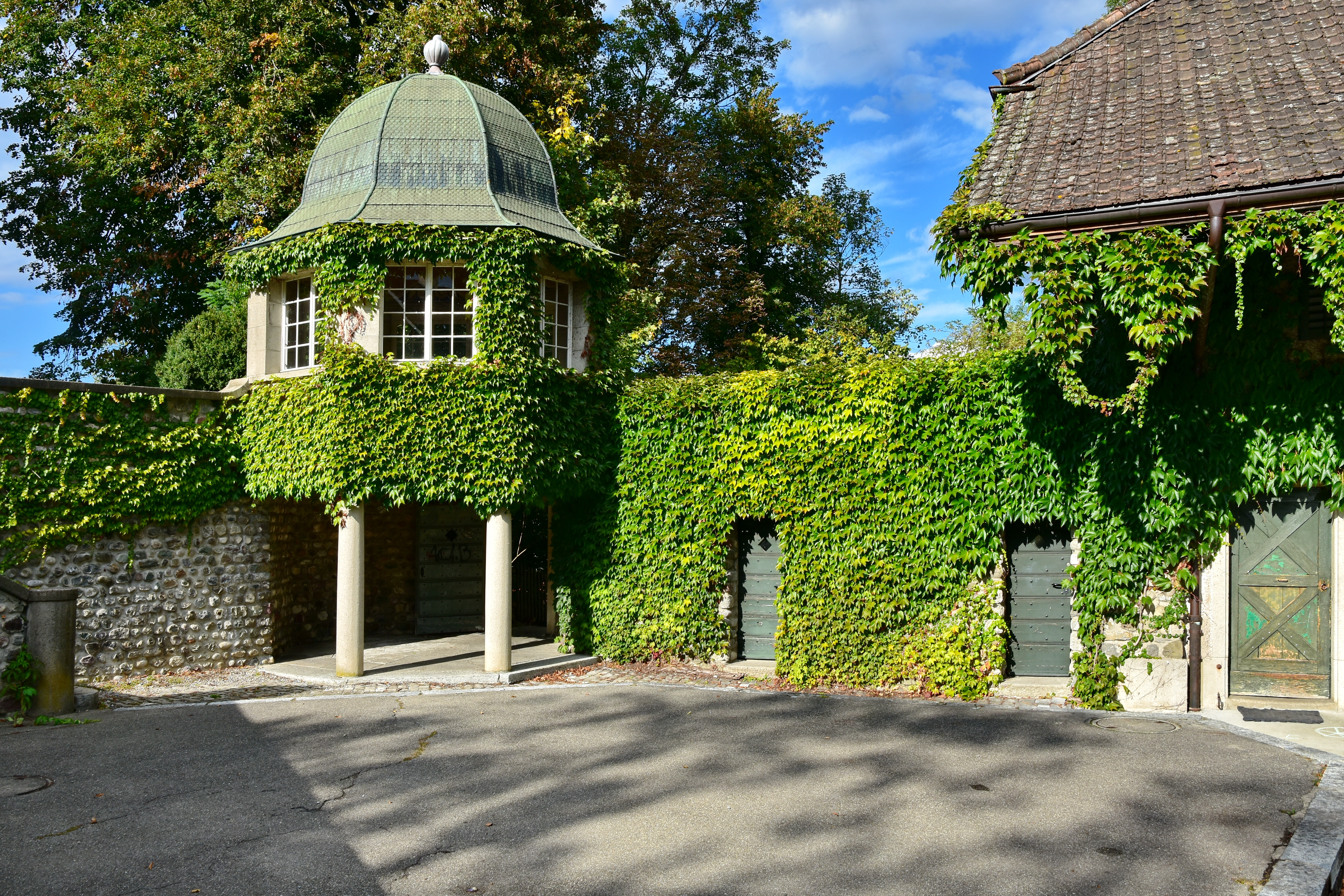

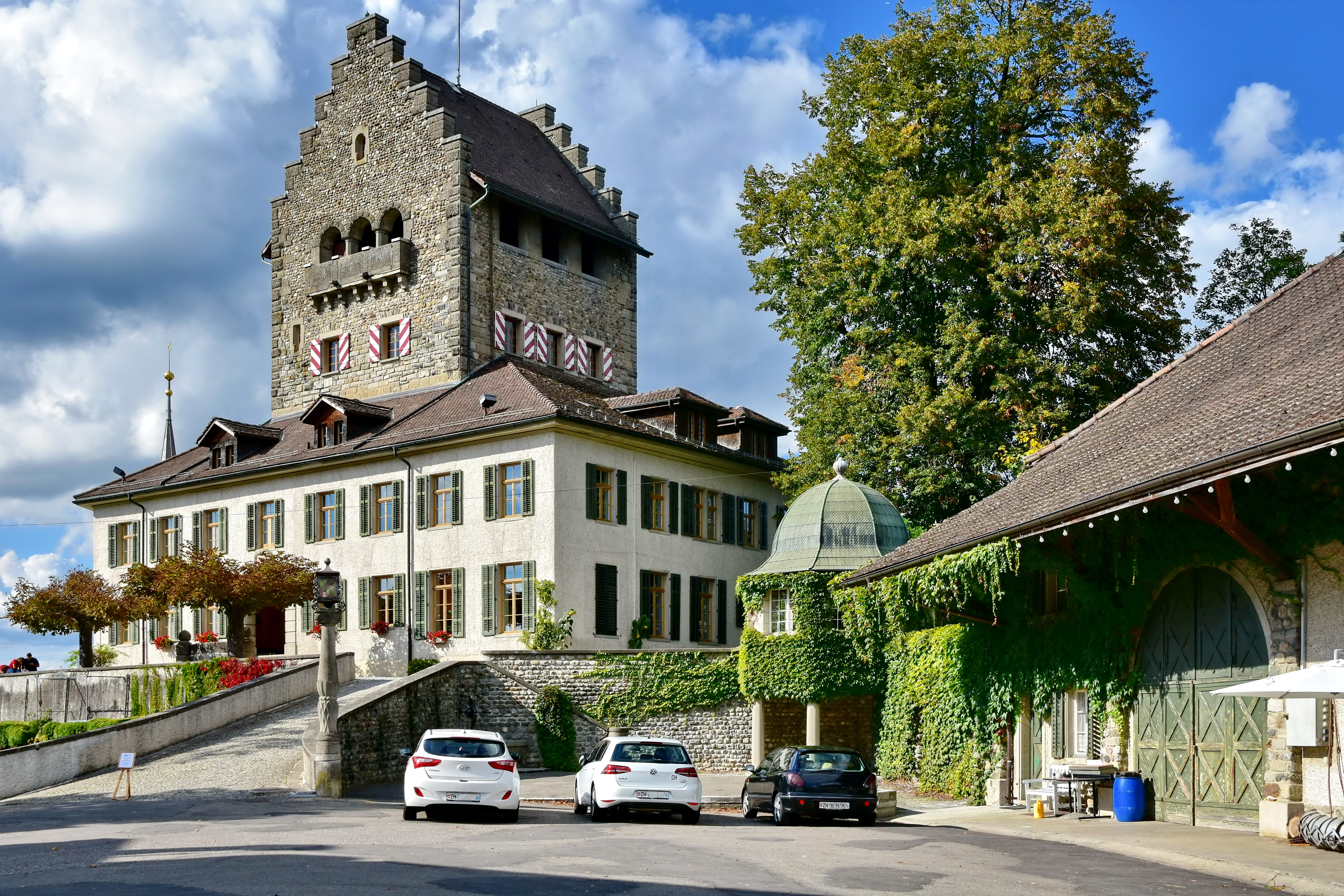

Between 1917 and 1919 the most recent redesign was carried out, and the tower rebuilt and again sided with a new, historicist superstructure, now a popular vantage point. At that time, battlements and belvedere, including the upper two tower rooms were demolished. The upper floors were rebuilt, and the staircase of 1529 assumably integrated. In addition, the existing fenestration was unified. Despite the efforts to reconstruct a medieval appearance, the now existing upper part of the castle tower is a bit raw guessed copy of the construction phase around 1529.

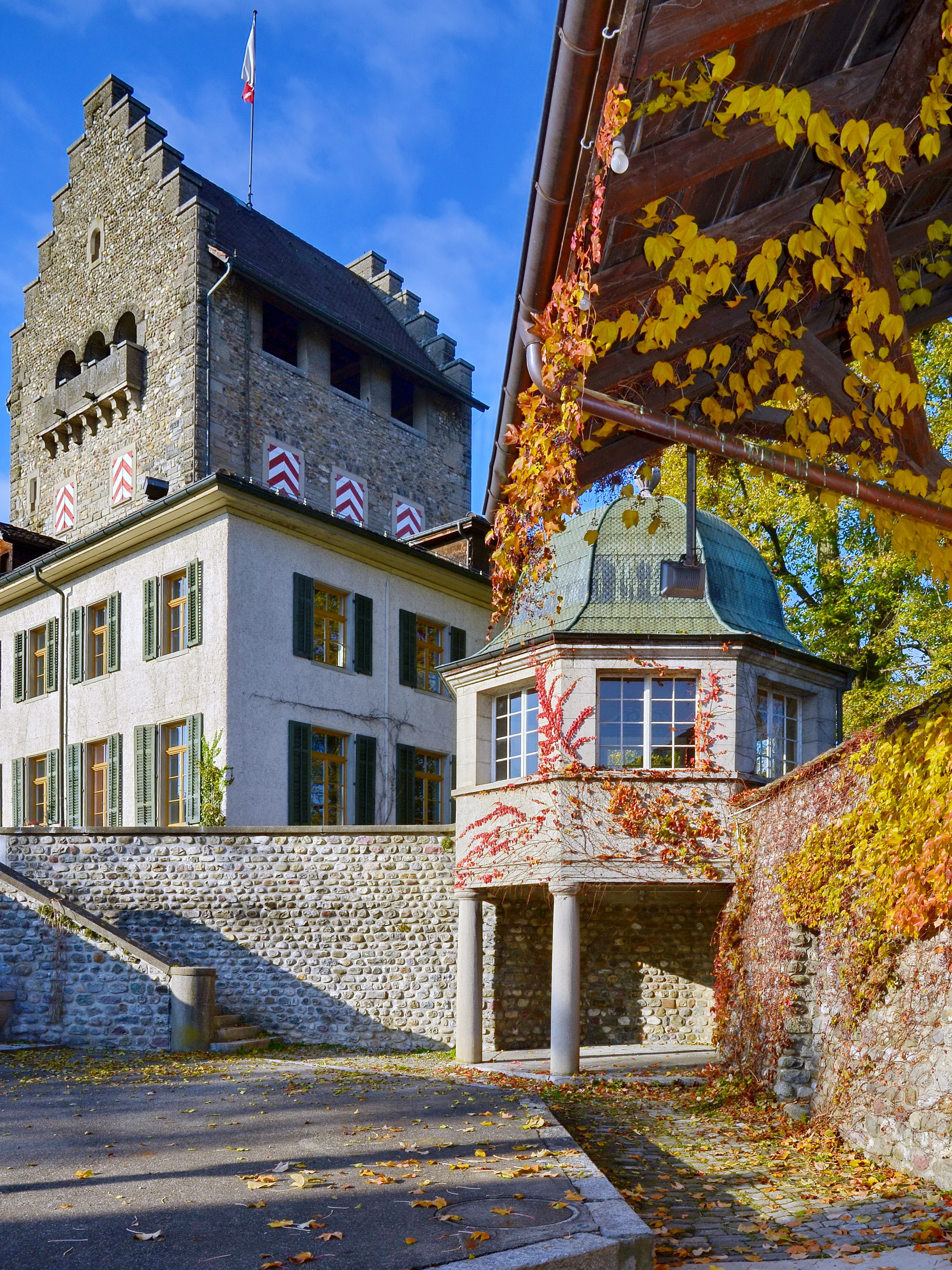
site of the remains of the wall and the barn

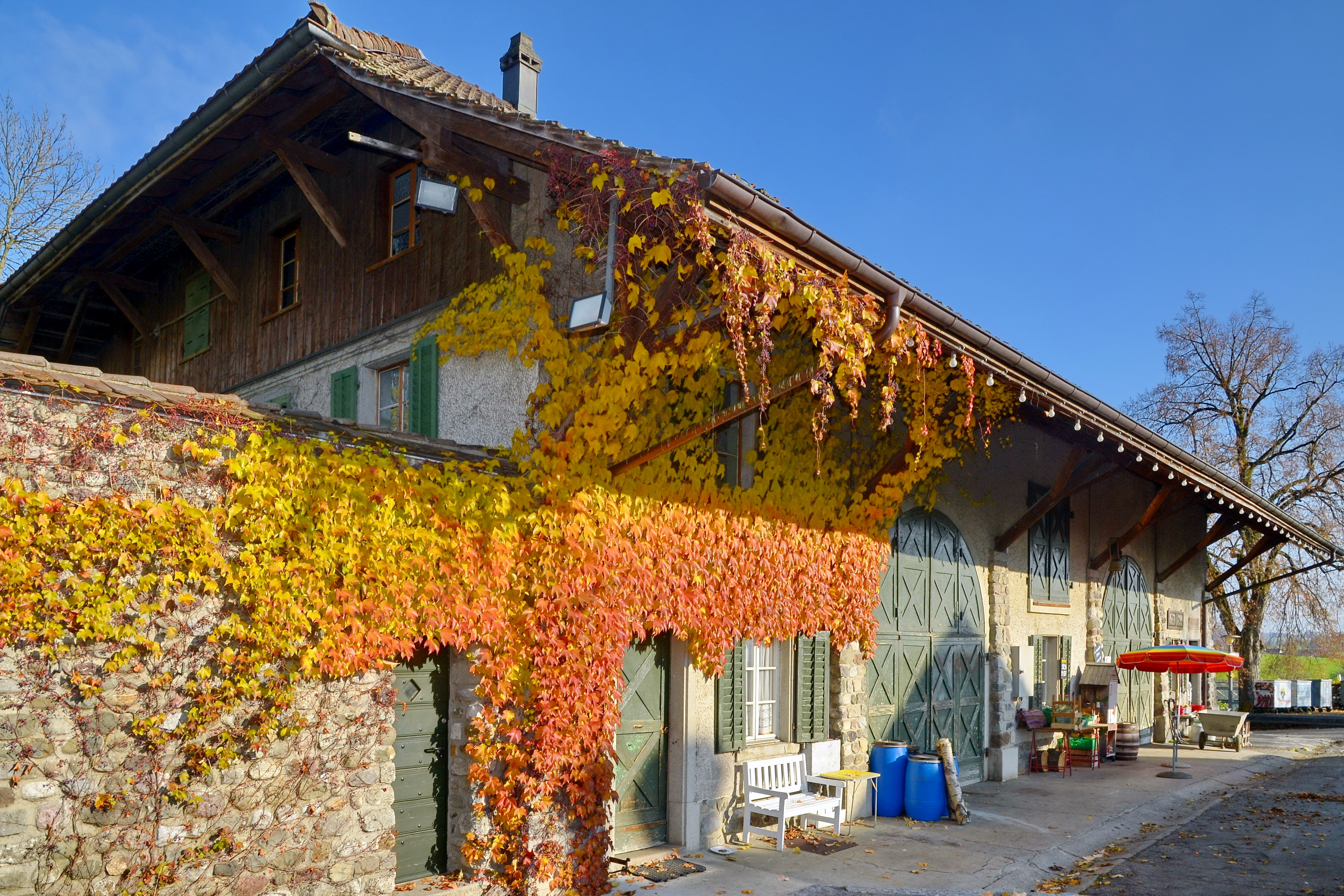

There are also about 10 metres (33 ft) long remains of the circular wall at the north, but it's unknown when it was built (1663 or before), as well as the origin of the neighboured barn is not documented. The present restaurant's predecessor structure probably was demolished around 1900; in ancient times it assumably served as the accommodation building of the tower, as seen on some historical illustrations, later assumably as a farmhouse.

== Facilities ==
The castle is administered by the city of Uster. To take care of the tower's "inhabitants", the public access is limited: From July to the end of October, on Sundays 2 to 5 pm, the castle's tower may used as vantage point overlooking the Glatt Valley and the Greifensee lake shore towards the Pfannenstiel–Forch mountain chain, as well as guided tours of the weapon chamber (Waffenkammer) and the Knights' Hall (Rittersaal) are held. There are separated entrances to the school and to the castle's tower.

== History ==
It is uncertain who built the tower of Uster around 1200 AD, or maybe much earlier, but it's secured that the House of Rapperswil had the right of patronate of Uster church since about 1099 AD, as well as lands in the present locality of Oberuster. Some historians suggest a fief of the St. Gallen abbey to the lords of Winterthur after disputes in 1027 AD; the feud later may belong to the Kyburg family, and not, as much of the surrounding area, to the House of Rapperswil. It is not known whether the knights of Uster mentioned as ministerials of the lords of Schnabelburg in 1249, have had a relationship with the castle. In 1267 the castle of Uster was claimed by the lords of Bonstetten which were closely related to those of Schnabelburg. In 1267 appears Hermann von Bonstetten, called von Uster respectively Ustra, in a document; in 1268 certified Ita von Teufen, wife of Johann von Wetzikon, twice on the Uster castle. In one of the two documents, Hermann von Bonstetten is called as a witness. The Bonstetten family held jurisdiction on the court of Nossikon, another locality of the present city of Uster, and partially of Kirchuster. Later, the lords of Bonstetten also acquired legal rights to Wermatswil, another neighbouring locality. When the Greifensee lordship passed from Elisabeth von Rapperswil in 1300 AD first to the Landenberg family and later to the city of Zürich, the lords of Bonstetten came into close contact with the city of Zürich. Kirchuster was attached to the manor, and during the Appenzell wars, Schwyz occupied the residential tower. At the same time, the lords of Bonstetten from Ustra (Uster) were mentioned as witnesses in at least two documents of the Counts of Toggenburg: On 23 April 1398 Count Donat von Toggenburg donated the church of Elsow as benefice for the altar at the grave of the Toggenburg family, for the salvation of the soul of his daughter Menta von Toggenburg, who died shortly before. Count Fridrich von Toggenburg donated to his own and the salvation of his ancestors who were buried at the Rüti church where he also expects to be buried, the church, rights and lands in Wangen in der March to the Rüti Abbey, sealed by Fridrich and the knights Herman von Landenberg, Johans von Bonstetten from Ustra and Herman von der Hochenlandenberg on 21 January 1407.

After the Appenzell wars Hans von Bonstetten concluded a pact with Zürich, and became a citizen of the city of Zürich respectively claimed the so-called Burgrecht in 1407. From that moment, the castle in time of war could be strengthened by a Zürich garrison. As an Austrian vassal, Zürich guaranteed a neutral status to the Bonstetten family, particularly during the Old Zürich War when the neighbouring town of Greifensee was besieged and destroyed by Old Swiss Confederacy marauders; the bodies of the defenders were buried at the Uster church. In 1492 a fire destroyed the castle. In 1534 Uster castle changed hands by inheritance into the possession of Ludwig von Diesbach. Frequent sales followed and one of the next owners, Hans Vogler sold all sovereign rights to the city of Zürich in 1544. The owners changed the following decades many times; the family who remained the longest the castle's owner, from 1560 to 1663, was that of Hohensax. Junker Tschudi's family from Bern was one of the next owners from 1563 to 1710. They were followed by Colonel Franz Schlatter von Graviseth's and his sons to 1750, followed by about 28 different owners within one century. In 1852 the castle became the seat of the district administration, and the tower was used as a prison. In the same year the castle was rebuilt, again, and a restaurant opened. Since 1858 the castle was in the hands of the Escher family. Jakob Heusser-Staub, a fabricant, bought the nearly ruined castle in 1916, financed a reconstruction by the architect Johannes Meier in 1917, and donated the property along with the economic structures to the citizens of Uster, managed by the Heusser-Staub-Stiftung, a foundation. During several decades the complex housed the cantonal farmers and home economics schools. Viticulture resumed at the Schlossberg by 1975. Since 1 September 1995 the castle houses the private boarding school Schloss Schule Uster, and the former restaurant Burg was rebuilt in a steakhouse in 2009.

== Western jackdaws on the castle's tower ==
The tower of the castle is home to a colony of regularly breeding Jackdaws, in Switzerland an endangered bird species, that's why the access to the tower is limited. The colony is characterized by hierarchy and social behavior, which is particularly evident for the mating season in the form of showdown, displays of affection and spectacular flight forms.

== Cultural heritage ==
The building is listed in the Swiss inventory of cultural property of national and regional significance as a Class B object of regional importance.

== See also ==
- Jakob Heusser-Staub
- Uster Reformed Church
