= Uster Reformed Church =

Evangelical Reformed church in Swiss municipality of Uster in Canton of Zürich

Reformierte Kirche Uster
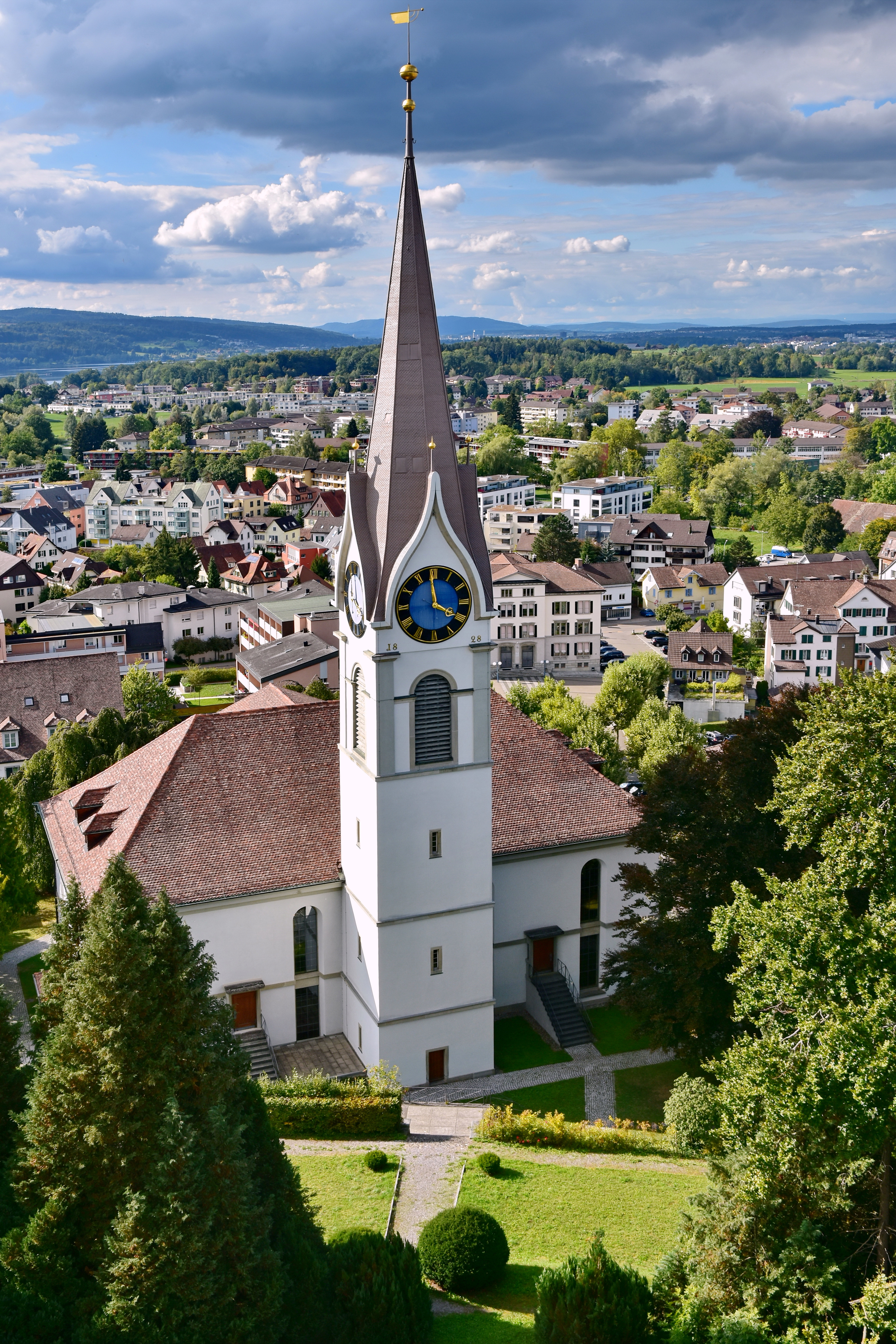
- Uster church as seen from the tower of the Uster Castle

Religion
- Affiliation: Reformed
- District: Evangelical Reformed Church of the Canton of Zürich

Location
- Location: Uster, Canton of Zürich; Switzerland
- Interactive map of Reformierte Kirche Uster
- Coordinates: 47°20′45.1″N 8°43′0.4″E

Architecture
- Type: Church
- Style: Classicism
- Completed: 1099 first mentioned; 1824 new church consecrated; 1827 church tower

Website
- Official website (in German)

Reformierte Kirche Uster (native German name, literally: Uster Reformed Church) is an Evangelical Reformed church in the Swiss municipality of Uster in the Canton of Zürich that was built in 1824. The predecessor St. Andreas church, situated next to the Uster Castle, was given by the House of Rapperswil and first mentioned in 1099 AD.

== Location ==
The church is situated in the center of the municipality of Uster on a small rocky plateau near the Uster Castle. The church was built below the conspicuous tower of the castle on a roughly 30 m (98 ft) high longish moraine hill between Oberuster and Kirchuster at an elevation of about 480 m (1,570 ft) just 75 metres (246 ft) westerly of the castle. It is located in Kirchuster, a locality of the municipality of Uster in the Canton of Zürich. On the southwestern slope a vineyard is situated, overlooking the Greifensee towards the Pfannenstiel–Forch mountain chain.

== Architecture ==
=== San Andreas church as of 1099–1823 ===
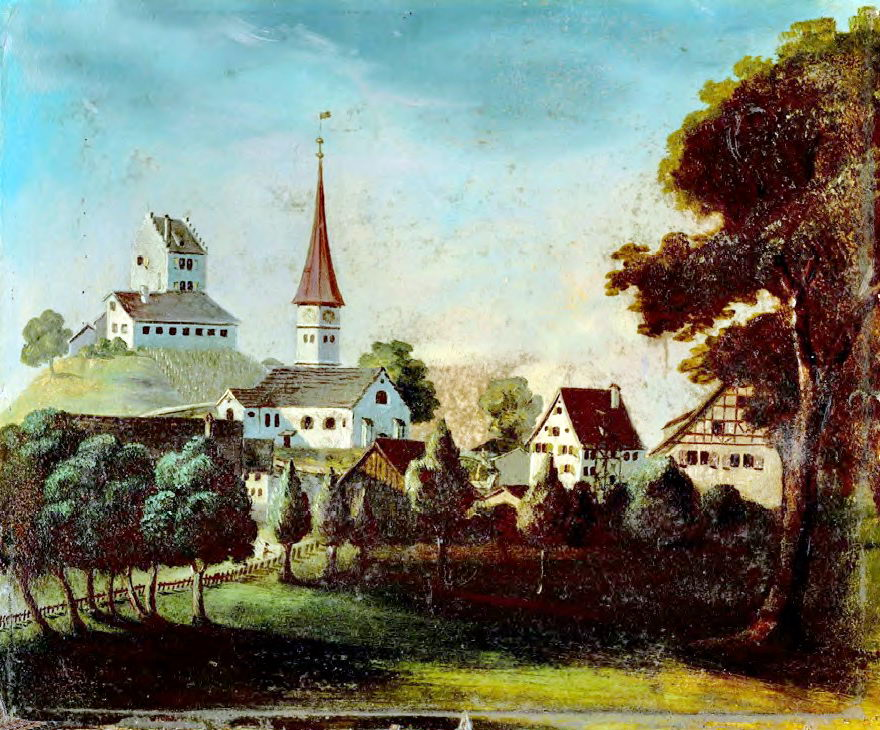
Uster castle and church before the old church was demolished in 1823, oil by unknown painter, Stadtarchiv Uster

From the known historical illustrations, the historians Kläui and Gubler tried to derive the architectural history of the former church that may have been built around 1099 AD or before: The Romanesque building was a three-nave, four-bay pillared basilica with a central nave and church tower. The nave was much higher than the aisles, so it had a basilica-analogue row of window above. In 1353 an extension of the northern aisle was carried out to house a chapel (Landenbergerkapelle). The reconstruction of 1469–1473 into a pseudo-basilica included increased aisle walls, the single roof truss over the three naves, the reconstruction of the west facade (buttresses, Gothic door and window), larger windows on the north side, and perhaps by analogy on the south side. The sacristy was attached to the Landenbergerkapelle, perhaps also the polygonal choir was arisen. The choir, including the sacristy, was rebuilt in 1669. The historian Paul Kläui leans, in addition to imagery, to the Jahrzeitbuch of 1469–1473, and to the comparable ground plan of the church of Oberwinterthur. The building sequence according to Kläui and Gubler therefore assumes that a Romanesque church has influenced significantly the well-known floor plan of the church of 1823, that was broken in that year.

=== Church building and tower as of 1827 ===
The present church was designed by the architect John Volkart as a cross church in Classicism style. Accessible via a monumental staircase, the transverse church has a massive portico of four columns in Tuscan order and an upstream buttress. In addition to the three portals of the main facade, there are also side portals and raised access on the northeastern side of the tower. The tower has a pointed spire and scalloped gable. The church tower has a height of 54 metres (177 ft) and was added in 1827. The peal consists of four bells, cast in Zürich and consecrated on 27 August 1882. The watch face has a diameter of about 4 metres (13 ft).

The interior of the church is a transverse sermon hall with a large underground gallery and a marble baptismal font at the intersection of the aisles. At the tower wall a two-story pulpit was built, which was carried out in classical style. The church is enlightened by high arched windows. Corinthian pilasters and a friezed entablature dominate its interior, as well as three articulated ceiling stucco cartridges in classical design.

== Pipe organ ==
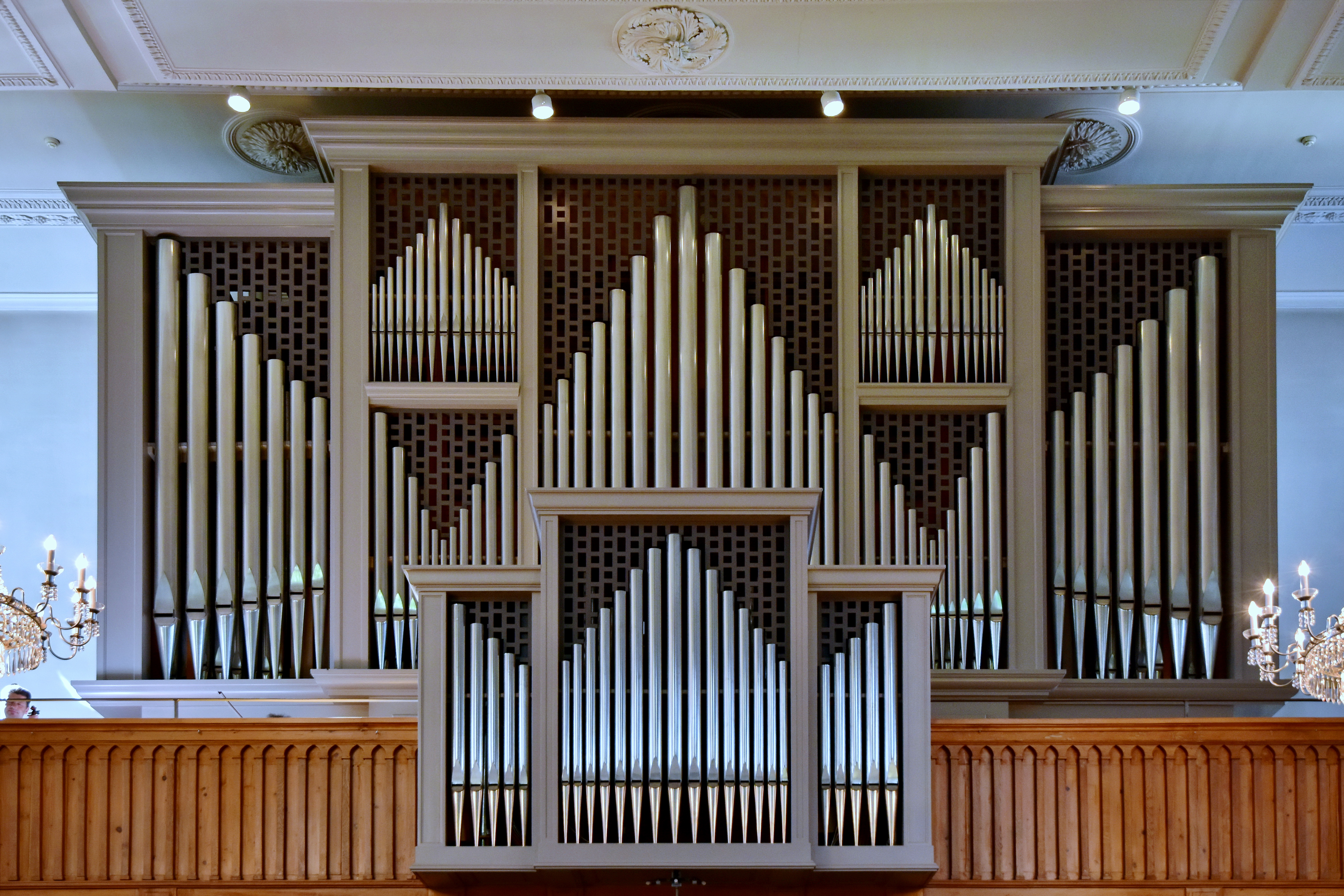

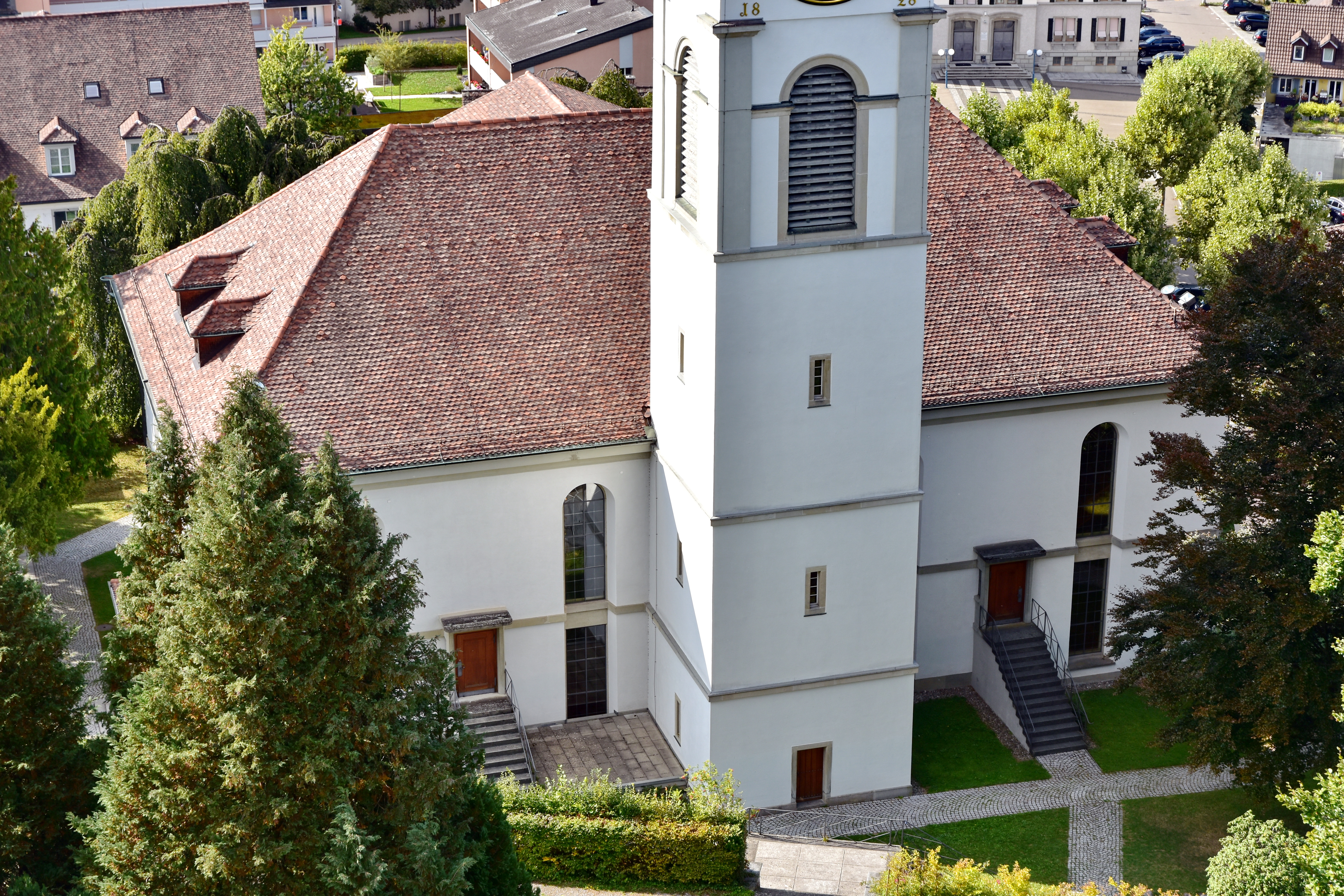
the small park as seen from the Uster Castle

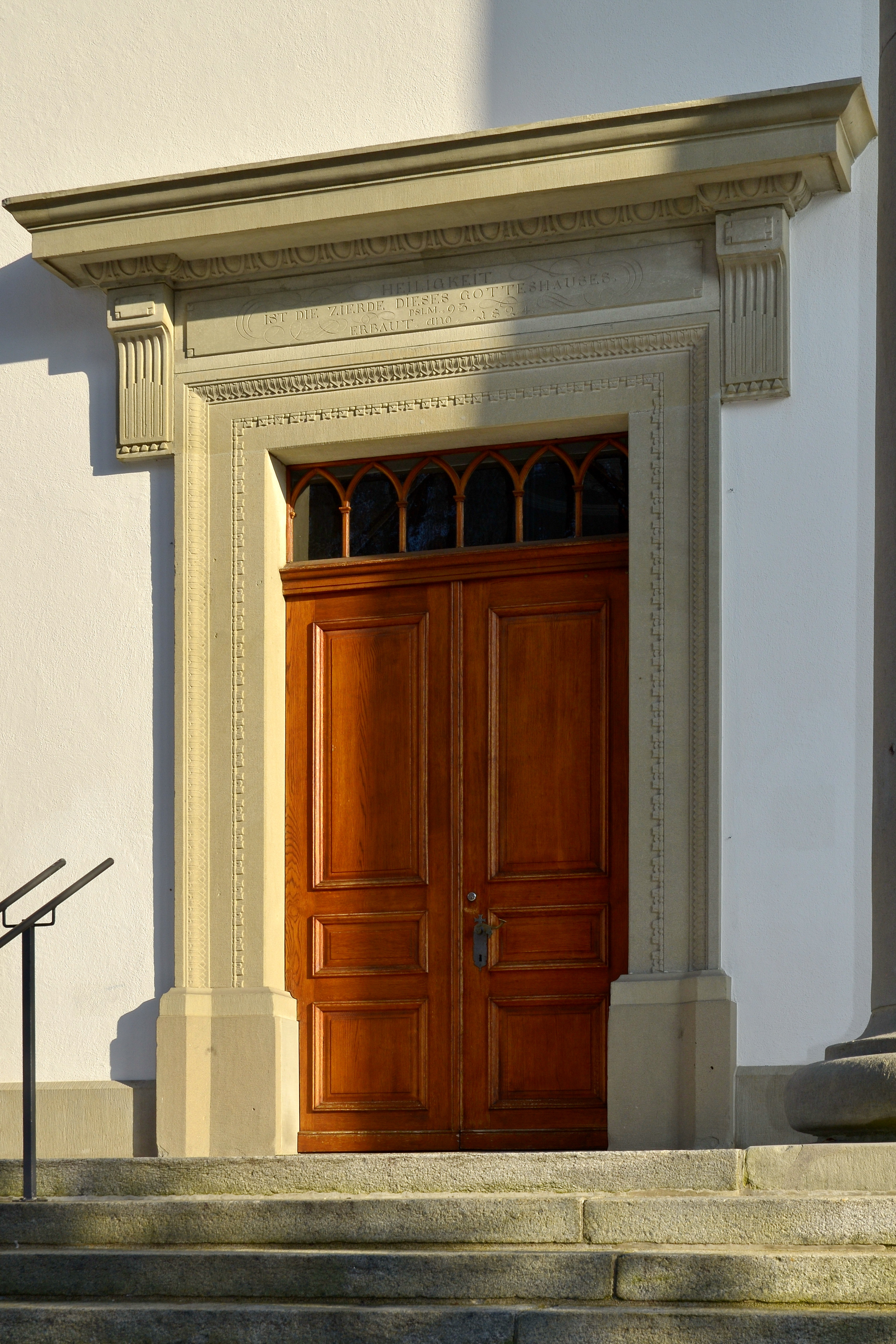
main portal

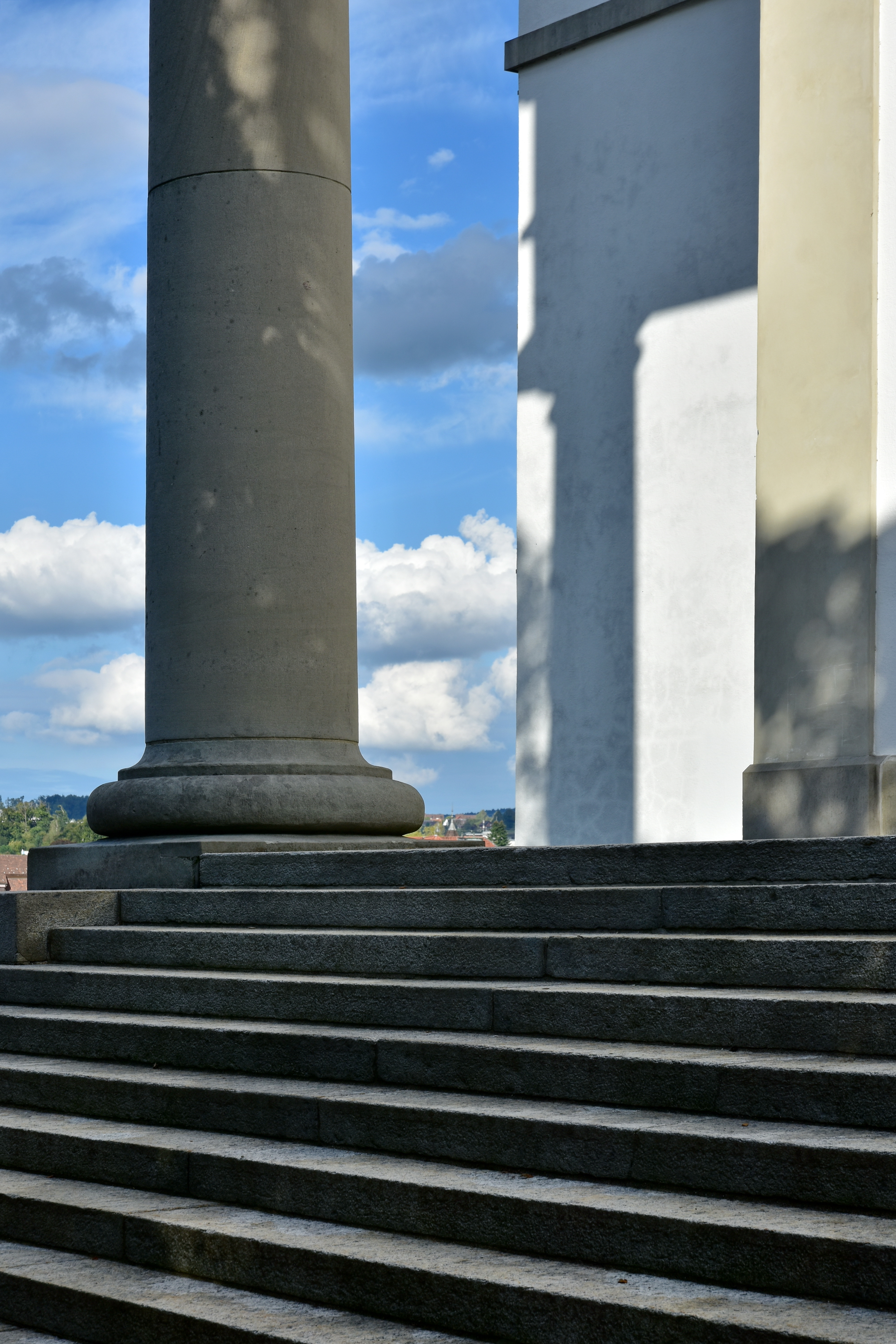

The pipe organ and Steinway & Sons piano B-211 in the gallery were installed by Orgelbau Goll Luzern in 1963, and revised in 1984, 1997 and 2009.

I Hauptwerk C–g^{3}
| 36. | Principal | 16' |
| 37. | Gedacktpommer | 16' |
| 38. | Principal | 8' |
| 39. | Flauto major | 8' |
| 40. | Gamba | 8' |
| 41. | Gedackt | 8' |
| 42. | Oktave | 4' |
| 43. | Hohlflöte | 4' |
| 44. | Spitzflöte | 4' |
| 45. | Quinte | 2^{2}/_{3}' |
| 46. | Oktave | 2' |
| 47. | Mixtur | 2' |
| 48. | Scharf | 1' |
| 49. | Trompete | 8' |
| 50. | Clairon | 4' |

II Rückpositiv C–g^{3}
| 35. | Manual II-I |
| 34. | Manual III-I |
| 33. | Manual III-II |
| 32. | Suavial | 8' |
| 31. | Quintatön | 8' |
| 30. | Discantflöte | 8' |
| 29. | Gedackt | 8' |
| 28. | Principal | 4' |
| 27. | Rohrflöte | 4' |
| 26. | Sesquialtera | 2^{2}/_{3}' |
| 25. | Flageolet | 2' |
| 24. | Larigot | 1^{1}/_{3}' |
| 23. | Mixtur | 1^{1}/_{3}' |
| 22. | Terzzimbel | ^{1}/_{6}' |
| 21. | Krummhorn | 8' |
| 20. | Tremulant |

III Schwellwerk C–g^{3}
| 19. | Rohrgedackt | 16' |
| 18. | Principal | 8' |
| 17. | Hohlflöte | 8' |
| 16. | Salicional | 8' |
| 15. | Voix céleste | 8' |
| 14. | Rohrflöte | 8' |
| 13. | Oktave | 4' |
| 12. | Blockflöte | 4' |
| 11. | Viola d'amore | 4' |
| 10. | Oktave | 2' |
| 09. | Nachthorn | 2' |
| 08. | Quinte | 2^{2}/_{3}' |
| 07. | Terz | 1^{3}/_{5}' |
| 06. | Plein jeu | 1^{1}/_{3}' |
| 05. | Zimbel | ^{1}/_{2}' |
| 04. | Basson | 16' |
| 03. | Trompete | 8' |
| 02. | Oboe | 8' |
| 01. | Clairon | 4' |

Pedal C–f^{1}
| 54. | Untersatz | 32' |
| 55. | Principalbass | 16' |
| 56. | Subbass | 16' |
| 57. | Zartbass | 16' |
| 58. | Principal | 8' |
| 59. | Spillflöte | 8' |
| 59. | Rohrgedackt | 8' |
| 60. | Oktave | 4' |
| 61. | Rohrflöte | 4' |
| 62. | Schwiegel | 2' |
| 63. | Mixtur | 4' |
| 64. | Posaune | 16' |
| 65. | Dulcian | 16' |
| 66. | Trompete | 8' |
| 67. | Zinke | 4' |

1) Gedeckt 8' Prinzipal 4' Flöte 4' Prinzipal 2' Mixtur

== History ==
In 1099 first mentioned, the donation of the parish church St. Andreas was given by the House of Rapperswil as a spacious three-naved country church. The assumably legal connection between the church, situated just above the castle, and Uster Castle, due to the archaeological investigations so far is not proven, but the church rights are documented, and the fate of the Herrschaft Greifensee was dominated by these ancient pastoral rights. On 7 January 1300 Elisabeth von Rapperswil sold the pledge of Greifensee to the knight Hermann II von Landenberg, including the Greifensee castle, the town and the lake of the same name, and a larger number of farms, as well as the pastoral rights (Kirchrecht) in Uster. On page 3 of the year book (Jahrzeitbuch) of the Uster church donations by the Landenberg family in favor of the Uster church, for the eternal light in its St. Peter chapel and the establishment of a benefice at the altar of the same chapel, as well as the foundation of the Gallus chapel in Greifensee and the foundation of those castle chapel are mentioned around 1350.

On 18 March 1381 Herman von Landenberg-Greifensee asked the bishop of Konstanz, to deputise his son Herman von Landenberg, a clerical, to the Kirchherr of the Uster church, as Herman got the pastoral rights (literal Präsentations- und Verleihungsrecht) when Rudolf von Landenberg resigned. In 1438 the church rights were sold to the Rüti Abbey. The church was considered as a part of the so-called "Laubishof" estate that possibly was located at the nearby plateau where the Uster Castle is situated.

After the so-called Appenzell wars, Hans von Bonstetten, then the Uster castle's owner, concluded a pact with Zürich, and became a citizen of the city of Zürich respectively claimed the so-called Burgrecht in 1407. As an Austrian vassal, Zürich guaranteed a neutral status to the Bonstetten family, particularly during the Old Zürich War when the neighbouring town of Greifensee was besieged and destroyed by Old Swiss Confederacy marauders; the bodies of the defenders were buried at the Uster church in 1444.

Among many other transfers of lands and goods, on 25 April 1448 Beringer von Landemberg von Griffensee confirmed with permission of his sons Hug and Beringer dem Jungen that at the place where all his ancestors have been buried, money, goods and lands were given to the Uster church as a benefice.

In 1473 the church comrades, based on an older Jahrzeitbuch (Latin: libri anniversariorum) which now is lost, created a new issue being among the best preserved late medieval pastoral books of the Canton of Zürich. With the dissolution of the Rüti abbey during the Reformation in Zürich, its rights fell on the government of the city of Zürich in 1525. In 1824 the new Reformed church was consecrated.

== Cultural heritage of national importance ==
The Uster church is listed in the Swiss inventory of cultural property of national and regional significance as a Class A object of national importance.
