= Bank BSU =

Bank in Uster, Switzerland

- Native name: Bank BSU Genossenschaft
- Industry: Bank
- Founded: 1836; 190 years ago
- Headquarters: Bankstrasse 21, 8610 Uster, Switzerland
- Key people: Peter Germann (CEO)
- Number of employees: about 40
- Website: www.bankbsu.ch

Bank BSU or Bank BSU Cooperative is a Swiss regional bank located in Uster, canton of Zurich. It was founded in 1836 as a savings bank of the district Uster and in 1892 it was registered using the name Sparkasse des Bezirkes Uster as a cooperative. Since 2012 the bank uses its current name.

In 2001 was opened a branch office in Dübendorf and in 2008 at Volketswil.

== Services ==
The focus of BSU is on

- retail banking
- mortgage lending
- private banking
- banking for small and medium enterprises, etc.

It employs about 40 people and the balance sheet total was 977 million CHF in 2015.

Bank BSU is an independent regional bank of the RBA holding company.
