= LFZ =

LFZ may refer to:

- Imperial Porcelain Factory, formerly Lomonosov Porcelain Factory, a producer of ceramics in Saint Petersburg, Russia
- Lycée français Marie Curie de Zurich, a French school in Switzerland
