= Dübendorf =

- Municipality
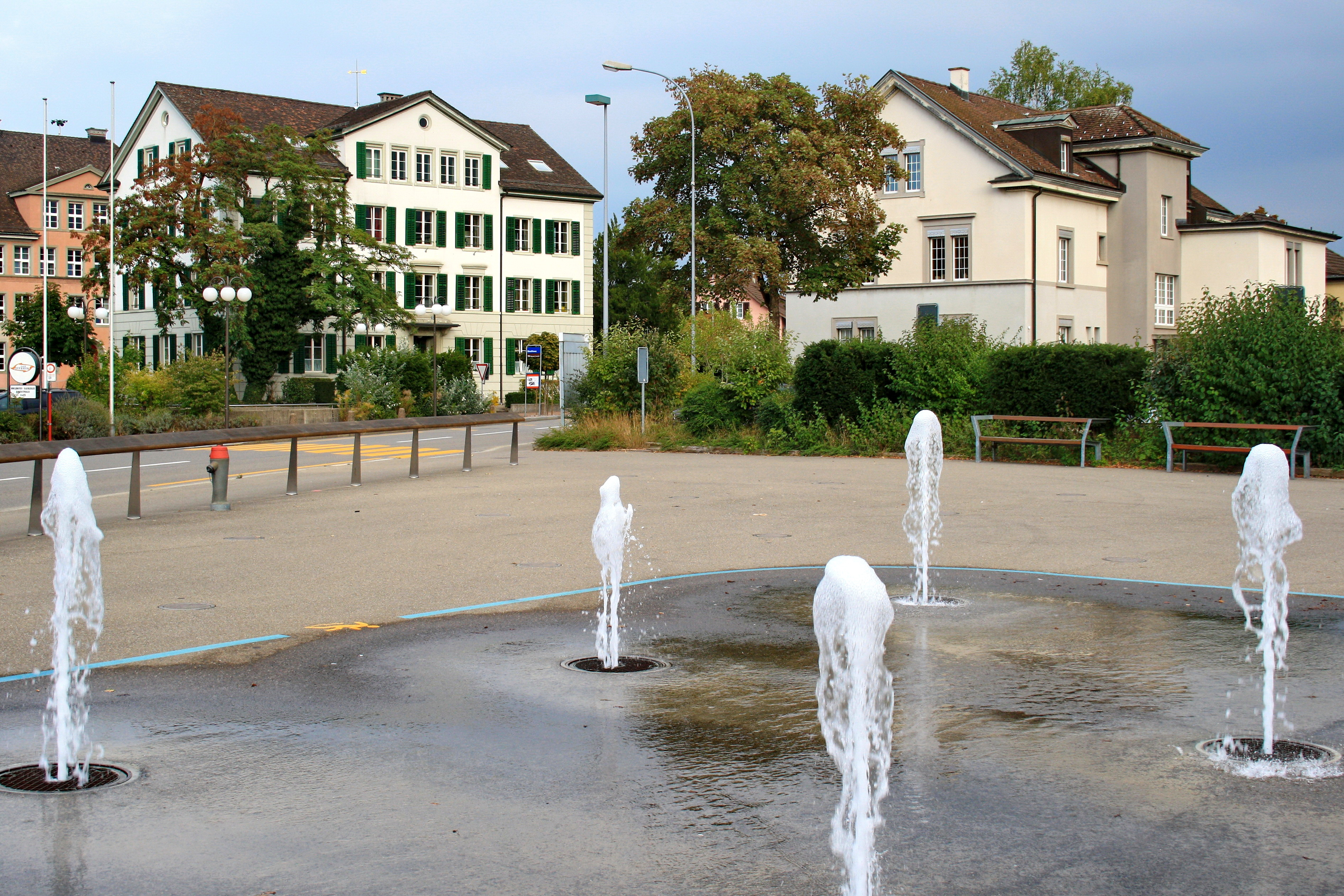

- Flag Coat of arms
- Location of Dübendorf
- Location within Switzerland Location within Canton of Zürich
- Coordinates: 47°25′N 8°37′E
- Country: Switzerland
- Canton: Zürich
- District: Uster

Government
  - Executive: Stadtrat with 7 members
  - Mayor: Stadtpräsident; André Ingold (as of July 2018)
  - Parliament: Gemeinderat with 40 members

Area
  - Total: 13.61 km^{2} (5.25 sq mi)
- Elevation: 440 m (1,440 ft)

Population (December 2020)
  - Total: 29,907
  - Density: 2,197/km^{2} (5,691/sq mi)
- Time zone: UTC+01:00 (CET)
  - Summer (DST): UTC+02:00 (CEST)
- Postal code: 8600
- SFOS number: 191
- ISO 3166 code: CH-ZH
- Localities: Dübendorf, Dübelstein, Geeren, Gfenn, Gockhausen, Hermikon, Stettbach
- Surrounded by: Dietlikon, Fällanden, Schwerzenbach, Volketswil, Wallisellen, Wangen-Brüttisellen, Zürich
- Website: duebendorf.ch

Dübendorf is a municipality in the district of Uster in the canton of Zürich in Switzerland.

It is a suburb of Zürich in Switzerland with a population of about 30,000 (2021). It is the fourth largest city in the canton, after Zürich, Winterthur and Uster.

== History ==
Aerial view from 500 m by Walter Mittelholzer (1923)

Artifacts have been discovered in the Dübendorf municipality, with the earliest dating back to prehistoric times. These include isolated relics from the Stone and Bronze Ages, as well as known burial sites. However, the original graves have been destroyed, leaving only the grave goods, which are estimated to be from approximately 1400 to 700 BCE.

Dübendorf is first mentioned in 946 as Tuobilindorf. In the 8th century, it is likely that the village and the church were already under the ownership of the Reichenau Abbey situated on Lake Constance. This monastery held a significant position as the primary landowner in Dübendorf for an extended period and also wielded legal authority. Additionally, there is evidence of a forgotten castle site known as the "Schyterburg," believed to have been constructed in the 10th or 11th century, located within Dübendorf's municipal boundaries.

On the northeastern side of the Adlisberg the ruins of the Dübelstein castle are situated; from 1487 to 1489 the home of Hans Waldmann, former mayor of the city of Zürich. After Waldmann's execution in 1489, all his possessions fell to the city of Zürich. Dübelstein Castle went up in flames in 1615. The ruined mound, which is a listed building and open to the public, with the remains of its foundations excavated and restored in 1942/43, was sold to the Pro Waldmannsburg association in 1998 for the symbolic price of one Swiss franc.

== Geography ==
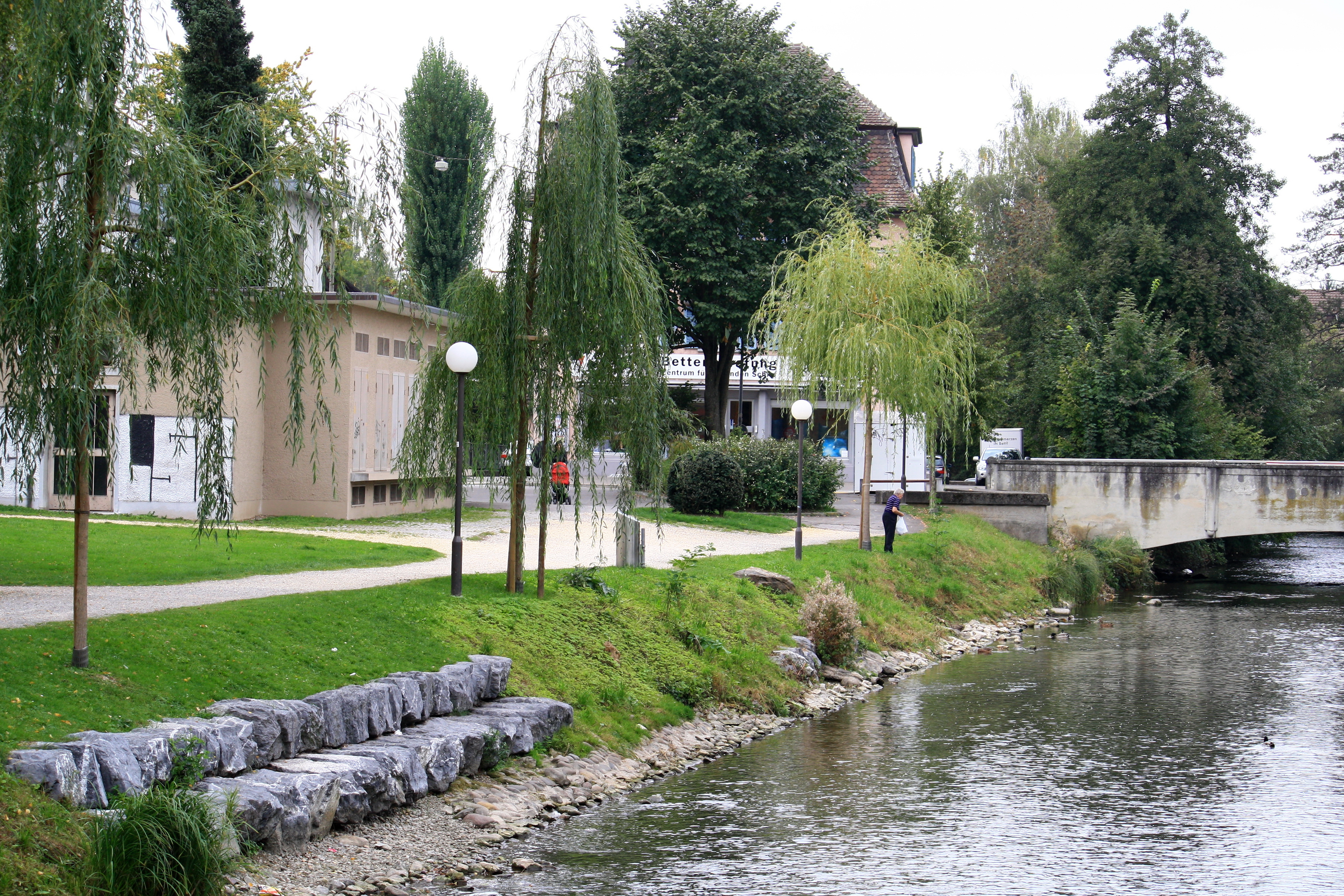
Glatt river in Dübendorf

Dübendorf has an area of 13.6 km^{2} (5.3 sq mi). Of this area, 37.6% is used for agricultural purposes, while 19.5% is forested. Regarding the rest of the land, 41.9% is settled (buildings or roads) and the remainder (1%) is non-productive (rivers, glaciers or mountains). In 1996 housing and buildings made up 29.6% of the total area, while transportation infrastructure made up the rest (12.3%). Of the total unproductive area, water (streams and lakes) made up 1% of the area.

The city is situated roughly 10 km (6.2 mi) north east of Zürich. It is bisected by the Glatt river which runs from the Greifensee (Lake Greifen) which lies directly to the southeast. Dübendorf is located in the Glatt Valley (German: Glattal). Dübendorf is located on the northern side of the Adlisberg, as well, on a terrace on the northern side of the city of Zürich the hamlets Gockhausen and Geeren.

== Demographics ==
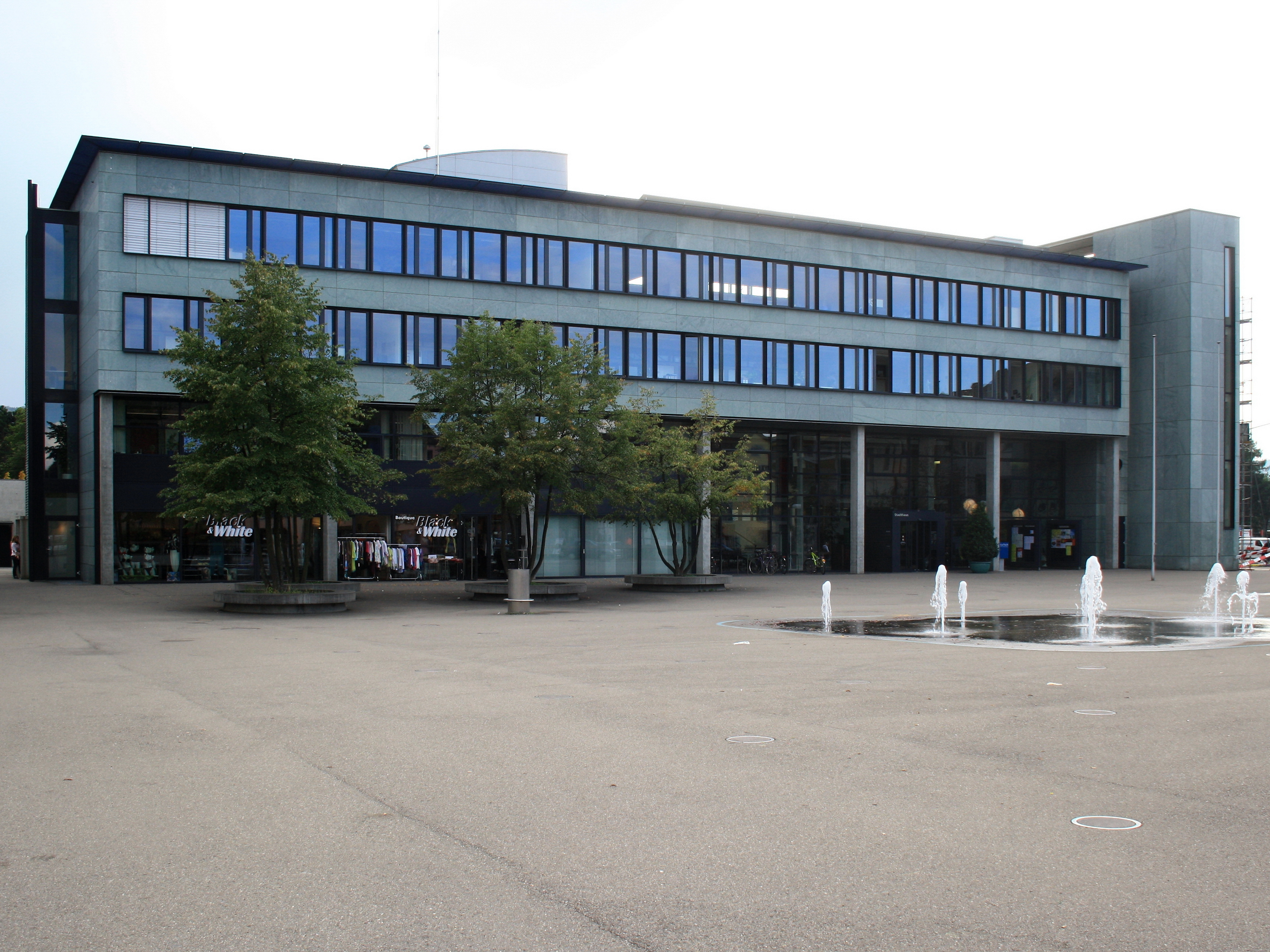
Stadthaus, city administration and town hall

Dübendorf has a population (as of 31 December 2020) of 29,907. As of 2007, 28.2% of the population was made up of foreign nationals. As of 2008 the gender distribution of the population was 49.2% male and 50.8% female. Over the last 10 years the population has grown at a rate of 10.5%. Most of the population (as of 2000) speaks German (81.8%), with Italian being second most common ( 4.5%) and Serbo-Croatian being third ( 2.1%).

In the 2007 election the most popular party was the SVP which received 39.1% of the vote. The next three most popular parties were the CSP (17.5%), the SPS (16.1%) and the FDP (10.4%).

The age distribution of the population (as of 2000) is children and teenagers (0–19 years old) make up 19.1% of the population, while adults (20–64 years old) make up 67.6% and seniors (over 64 years old) make up 13.3%. In Dübendorf about 73.6% of the population (between age 25-64) have completed either non-mandatory upper secondary education or additional higher education (either university or a Fachhochschule). There are 10,786 households in Dübendorf.

As of 2008 there were 7,733 Catholics and 7,553 Protestants in Dübendorf. In the 2000 census, religion was broken down into several smaller categories. From the census, 39.2% were some type of Protestant, with 37.1% belonging to the Swiss Reformed Church and 2.1% belonging to other Protestant churches. 33.6% of the population were Catholic. Of the rest of the population, 6% were Muslim, 9.4% belonged to another religion (not listed), 4.6% did not give a religion and 12.4% were atheist or agnostic.

The historical population is given in the following table:

| Year | Population |
|---|---|
| 1467 | c. 225 |
| 1634 | 553 |
| 1710 | 1,031 |
| 1850 | 2,018 |
| 1900 | 2,544 |
| 1950 | 6,750 |
| 1970 | 19,639 |
| 2000 | 22,216 |
| 2010 | 24,607 |
| 2020 | 29,685 |
| 2025 | 32,877 |

== Industry ==
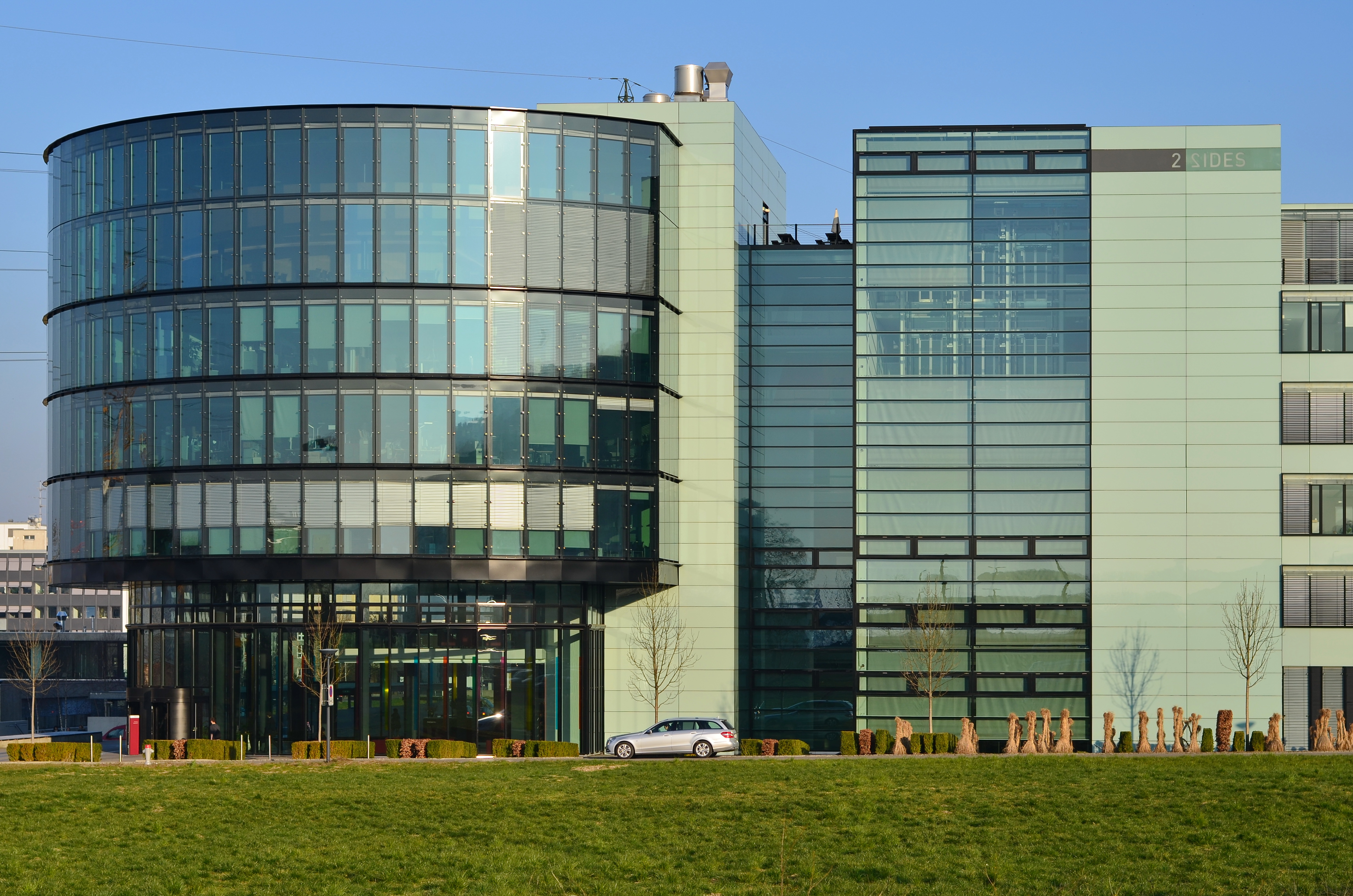
Helsana administration building in Stettbach quarter

Dübendorf is the home of two research institutions that are part of the Swiss Federal Institute of Technology domain (ETH-Bereich):

Empa
Empa is a materials science and technology research institution with 5 programs: Nanotechnology, Adaptive Materials Systems, The Healthy Human, Materials for Energy Technology and Technosphere - Atmosphere.
Eawag
Eawag is the Swiss Federal Institute of Aquatic Science and Technology. There are a variety of topics researched at Eawag: Applied Aquatic Ecology, Chemical Pollutants, Environmental Engineering, Environmental Microbiology, Environmental Toxicology, Fish Ecology and Evolution, Limnology, Surface Waters, Systems Analysis/Integrated Assessment and Modeling, Urban Water Management, Water and Agriculture, Water and Sanitation in Developing Countries (SANDEC) and Water Resources and Drinking Water.

Givaudan, producer of flavors and fragrances, has a part of its R&D department located in Dübendorf. Hewlett-Packard's main Switzerland office is in Dübendorf.

The Aeromedical Center of the Swiss Air Force and the headquarters of the virtual reality aviation simulation company Loft Dynamics (formerly VRM Switzerland) are located in Dübendorf.

Dübendorf has an unemployment rate of 3.09%. As of 2005, there were 196 people employed in the primary economic sector and about 31 businesses involved in this sector. 2,410 people are employed in the secondary sector and there are 234 businesses in this sector. 11,663 people are employed in the tertiary sector, with 897 businesses in this sector. As of 2007, 76.1% of the working population were employed full-time, and 23.9% were employed part-time.

== Education ==
The Primarschulverwaltung Dübendorf serves primary school students. The Sekundarschule Dübendorf-Schwerzenbach serves secondary level students. The Kantonsschule Uster in Uster has gymnasium education and serves Dübendorf.

The Lycée Français Marie Curie de Zürich (LFZ), a French international school, is located on four campuses in the municipality.

The Bildungslandschaft Dübendorf starts with early childhood. It organizes a wide range of information, meeting and educational opportunities for families and subsidizes playgroup places. It is important to sensitize all parents to the fact that the first four years of life are central to the educational biography.

Through the Bildungslandschaft, stakeholders from the pre-school, social, health, integration and school sectors also network with each other. This creates a sustainable network around young children with the aim of giving them a fair chance of a good education.

== Places of interest ==
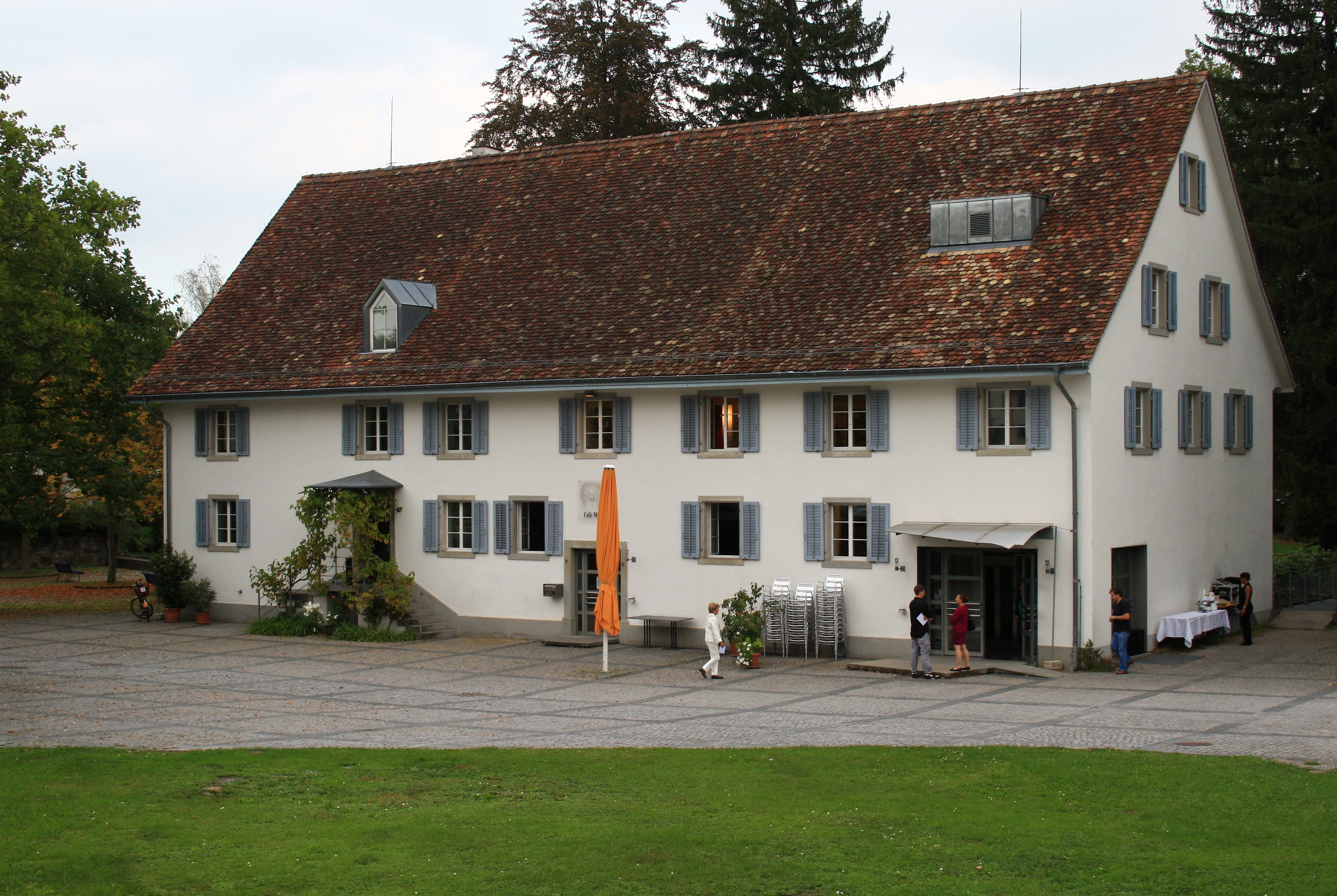
Obere Mühle, the cultural centre of Dübendorf

The town of Dübendorf is quite small and easy to get around on foot. Crossing from one side of the city to the other can be done within a half hour of casual walking. Apart from the city center and the river, an interesting place to visit is the museum of military aviation, displaying not just various military planes, but also various demonstration material (for instance, how helicopter control systems function) and two of the last original Junkers Ju 52 vintage aircraft in flying condition, which are used to provide sightseeing trips.

=== Transport ===
Dübendorf is served by both rail and bus links with the Zürich center (10 min), Winterthur (via Stettbach, 20 min) and other places in the canton of Zürich. Dübendorf railway station is a stop of the Zürich S-Bahn on the lines S9 and S14 and is a 13-minute (S9) ride from Zürich Hauptbahnhof. Stettbach railway station is a stop of the S-Bahn Zürich on the lines S3, S9, S11 and S12.

The military airport hosts one of the Rega bases. It currently is no longer used as the base of military jets.

== Gallery ==
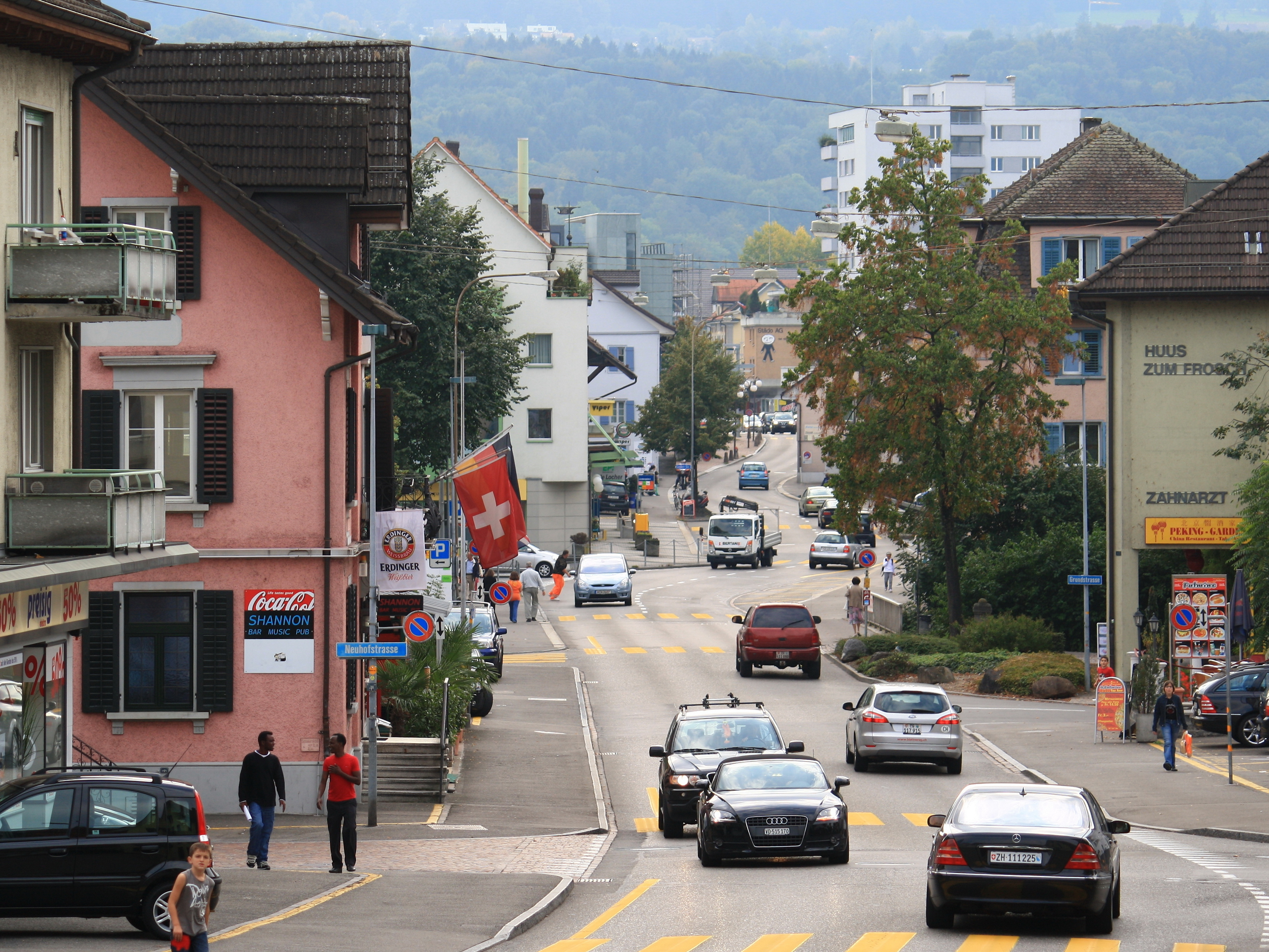
Bahnhofstrasse and inner city as seen from Dübendorf train station

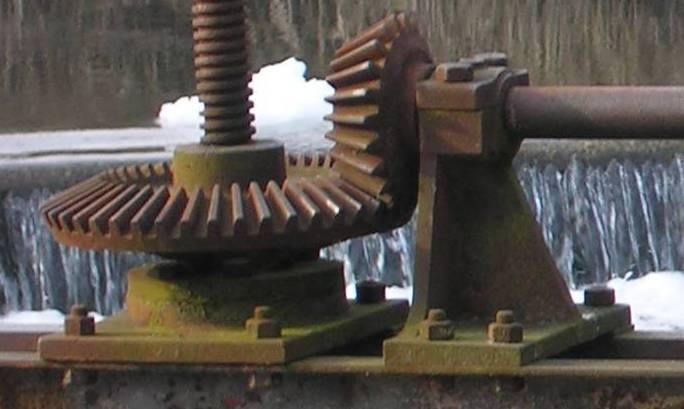
Technical solutions of the Glatt floodgates

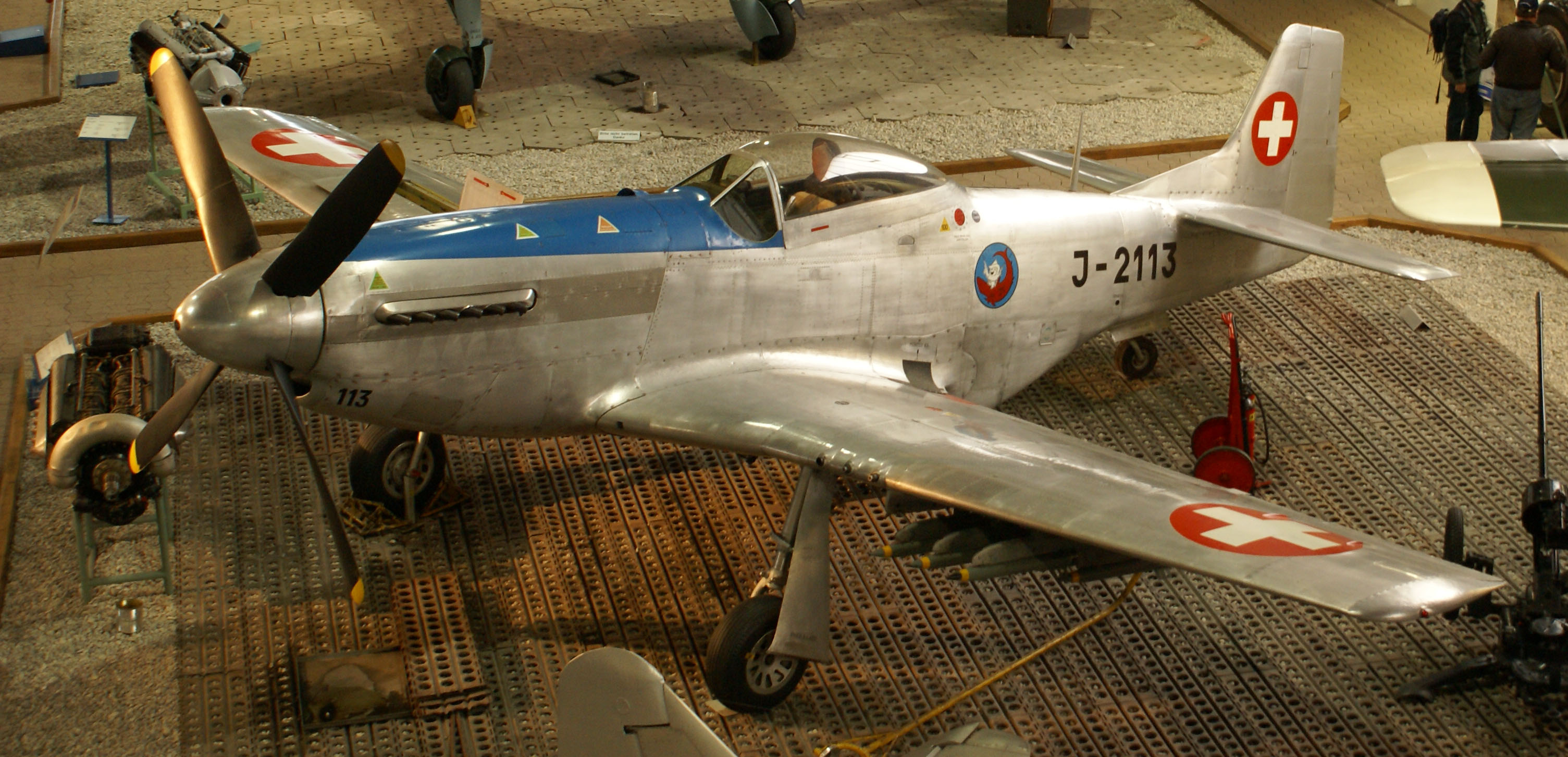
Swiss Air Force's P-51 Mustang in the Dübendorf museum of military aviation

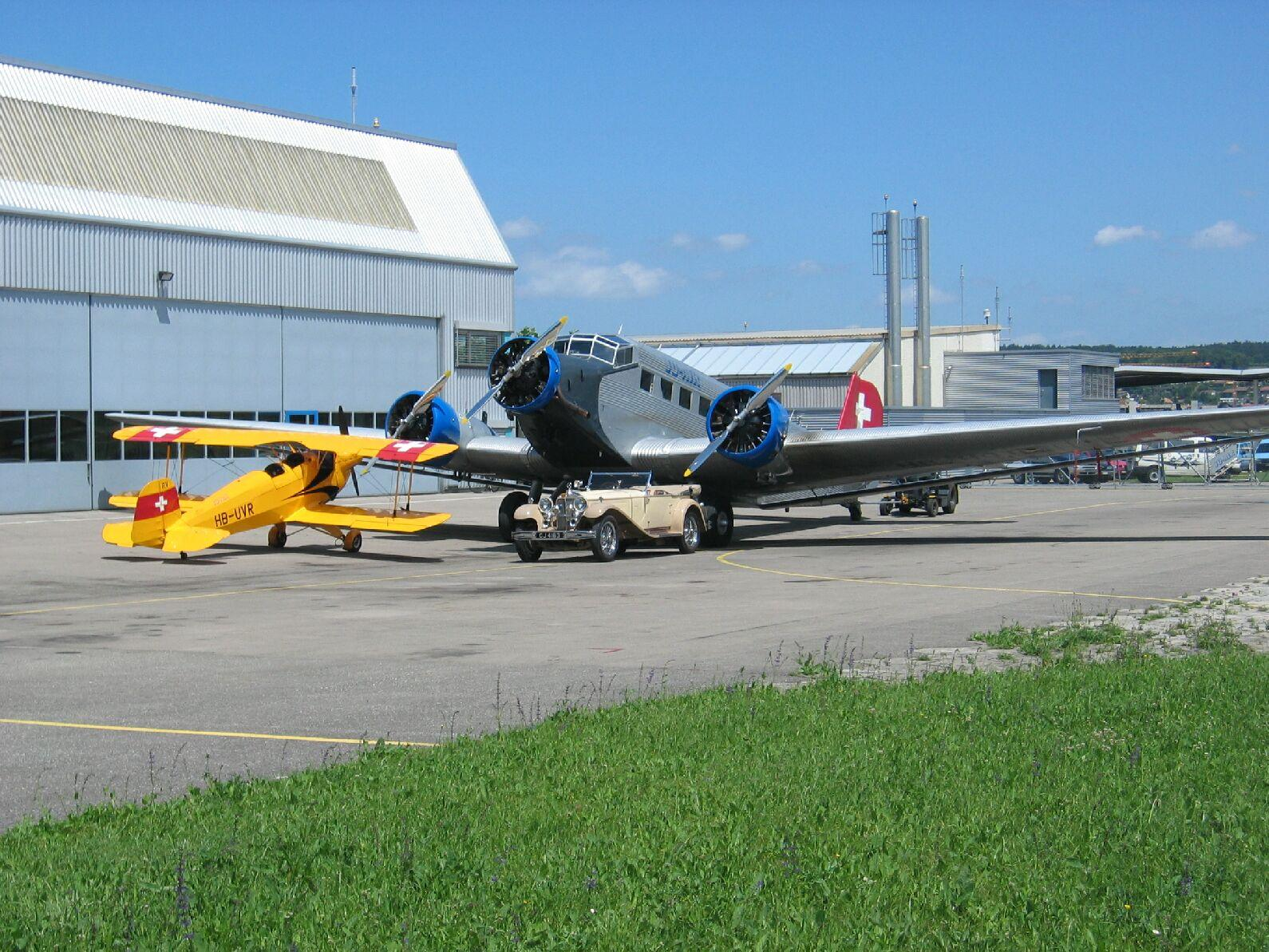
Junkers Ju 52 of the JU-AIR airline

== Twin town ==
- Dunavarsány, Hungary (2022)

== Notable people ==
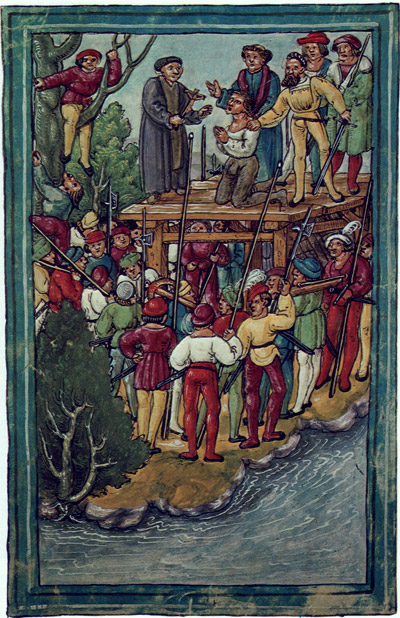
Execution of Hans Waldmann, 1513

- Hans Waldmann (1435–1489), Mayor of Zurich, a military leader and Squire of Dubelstein
- Wilhelm Meyer-Lubke (1861–1936), philologist of the Neogrammarian school of linguistics
- Oskar Bider (1891–1919 in Dübendorf), aviation pioneer
- Ruedi Walter (1916–1990), comedian and actor
- Peter von Matt (1937–2025), philologist and author, lived in Dübendorf
- Guerino Mazzola (born 1947), mathematician, musicologist, jazz pianist and author
- Michael Lammer (born 1982) a retired professional tennis player, lives in Dübendorf
- Leandra Columberg (born 1999), Swiss politician

== See also ==
- Solar Impulse
