= Kantonsschule Uster =

Secondary school in Zurich, Switzerland

Coordinates: 47.3486905°N 8.7054231°E

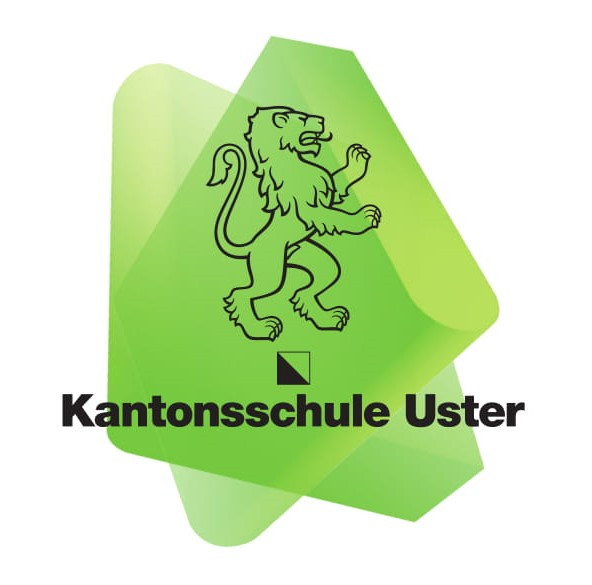
Kantonsschule Uster logo

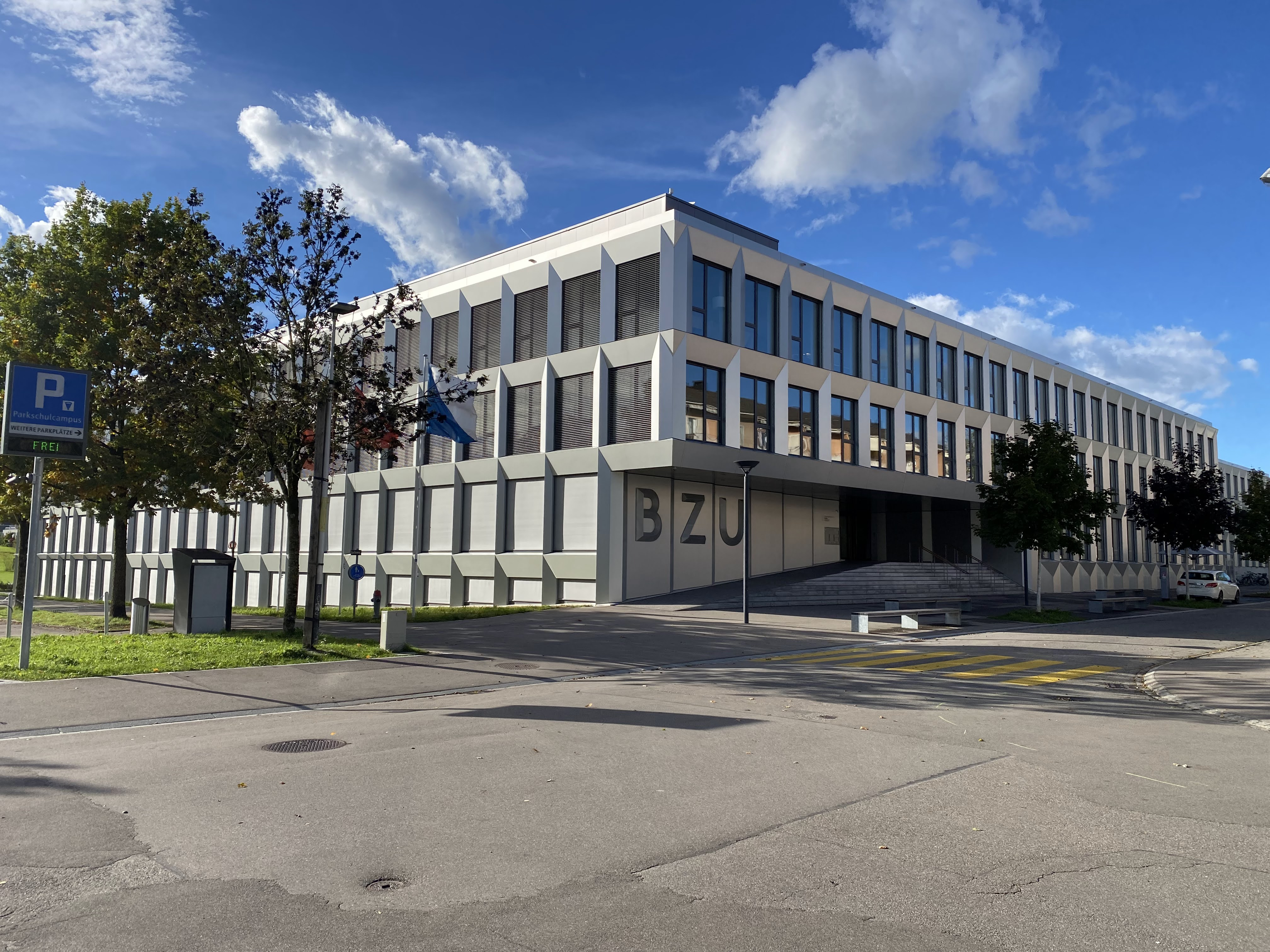
The new building, opened in 2019

Kantonsschule Uster (KUS) is a gymnasium (senior high school) located in Uster, Switzerland, in the Zurich metropolitan area. Originally the school was formed in Gutenswil. Students come from several areas, including Uster and Dübendorf.
