= Aeromedical Center, Dübendorf =

Fliegerärztliches Institut (FAI)
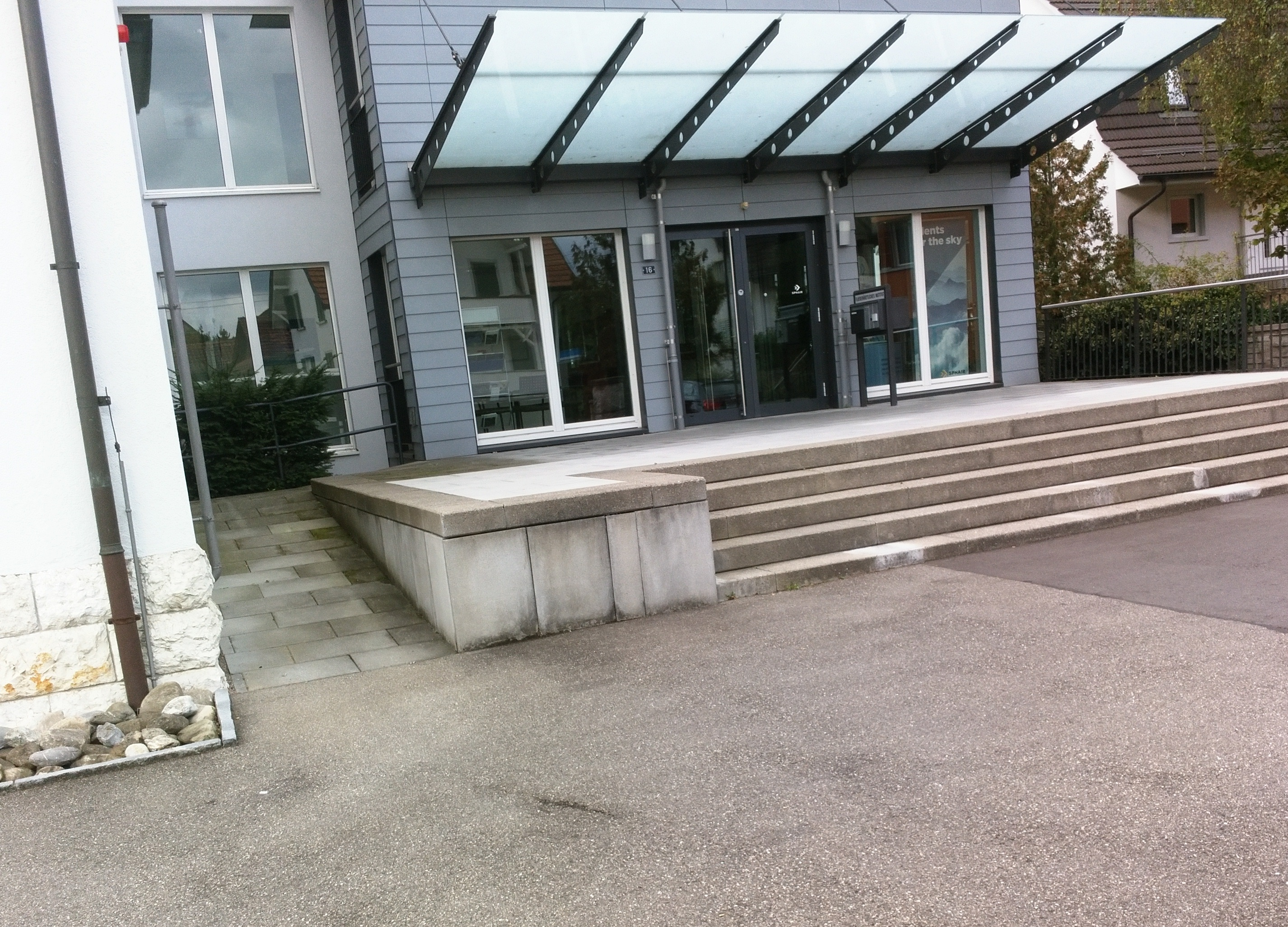
- Main Entrance of the Aeromedical Center (AMC)
- Active: 1922–present
- Country: Switzerland
- Branch: Swiss Air Force
- Type: Military medical installations
- Role: Aviation Medicine
- Size: 35
- Nickname(s): FAI

Commanders
- Current commander: Dr. Kunz Andres

Insignia
- Identification symbol

The Aeromedical Center (German: Fliegerärztliche Institut (FAI); French: Institut de médecine aéronautique (IMA); Italian: Istituto di medicina aeronautica (IMA)) of the Swiss Air Force is a center for medical and psychological assessments of men and women in the areas of military and civil aviation. It is located in Dübendorf, Switzerland, near the operational headquarters of the air force.

== Equipment ==
The main military missions are the carrying out of suitability and suitability assessments of the military aviation personnel and other military specialists of the Air Force and the military area of the Skyguide. This includes regular health checks, the preparation of nutrition plans and the provision of vaccinations; As well as research and training in the fields of flight psychology and flight medicine.

== History ==
On 23 October 2013, the FAI aviation medical doctor Volker Lang († 54), died when the F/A-18D J-5237, in which he flew as a passenger / observer, flew into the Mountain Lopper near Alpnach. The F/A-18 pilot Stefan Jäger of the Fliegerstaffel 11 also died.
