= List of mayors of Uster =

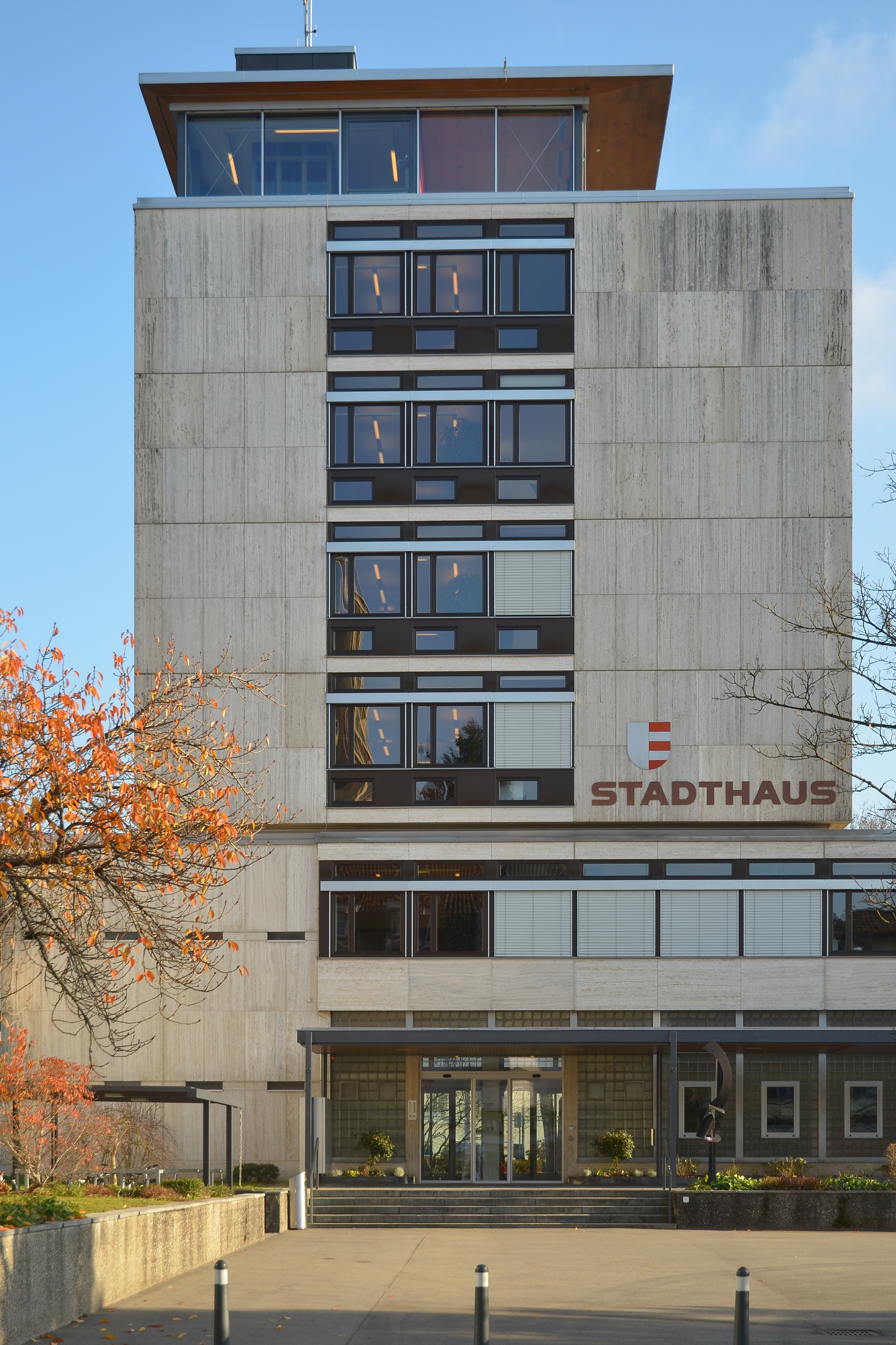
Stadthaus Uster

Coat of arms of Uster

This is a list of mayors (Stadtpräsident) of Uster, Canton of Zürich, Switzerland.

Mayor (Stadtpräsident, earlier: Gemeindepräsident) of Uster
Term	Mayor	Lifespan	Party	Notes
1895–1919	Johann Heinrich Bosshard-Morf		FDP/PRD	
1919–1922	Jean Graf-Brunner		Dem.	
1922–1925	Emil Stadler-Gujer		FDP/PRD	
1925–1938	Theophil Pfister		BGB	
1938–1948	Ernst Stalder		FDP/PRD	
1948–1958	Ernst Wettstein		BGB	
1958–1962	Hans Berchtold		FDP/PRD	
1962–1966	Werner Graf		FDP/PRD	
1966–1974	Albert Hofmann		SVP/UDC	Gemeindepräsident. From 1970: Stadtpräsident
1974–1986	Walter Flach		FDP/PRD	
1986–1998	Hans Thalmann		independent	
1998–2006	Elisabeth Surbeck-Brugger		FDP/PRD	
2006–2014	Martin Bornhauser	(born 1950)	SPS/PSS	
2014–2018	Werner Egli	(born 1957)	SVP/UDC	
since 2018	Barbara Thalmann	(born 1966)	SPS/PSS	
