= Lycée français Marie Curie de Zurich =

Coordinates: 47.4004°N 8.6008°E

- französische Gymnasium

Location
- Zukunftstrasse 1 - CH-8600 Dübendorf - Stettbach; Dübendorf; Switzerland

Information
- Type: Primary, middle, and high school
- Motto: apprendre, progresser, réussir
- Founded: 1955
- Rector: Quentin Duvauchelle
- Grades: K-12
- Website: lfz.ch

Lycée Français Marie Curie de Zurich (LFZ), German: französisches Gymnasium) is a French international school located in the municipality of Dübendorf, Canton of Zurich, Switzerland, with more than 1,360 students from reception to year 13.

== Accreditation ==
=== By Swiss authorities ===
LFZ's Kindergarten and primary education program (Primary School) as well as its lower secondary education program (Collège on the Sekundarstufe level) are approved by the bureau for elementary school (Volksschulamt), administration for education (Bildungsdirektion), canton of Zurich.

However LFZ's upper secondary education program (Lycée) is neither approved as a Mittelschule by the bureau for gymnasial and vocational education (Mittelschul- und Berufsbildungsamt), administration of education (Bildungsdirektion), canton of Zurich, nor approved by the Swiss Federal State Secretariat for Education, Research and Innovation (SERI).

Therefore, admission to Swiss universities with the new 2021 Baccalaureat is subject to certain restrictions.

=== By French authorities ===
The Lycée Français Marie Curie de Zurich (LFZ) is one of 535 registered establishments, which form the network of French schools abroad. As such, it is approved by the French Minister of Education. This guarantees compliance with the French curriculum as well as the recognition of the choice of study pathways and the exams taken by the pupils. On the other hand, it depends upon the French Minister of Foreign Affairs and more specifically on the Agency for French Teaching Abroad (AEFE), in Paris.

The Lycée Français Marie Curie de Zurich (LFZ) offers education from kindergarten (< 3 y.o.) to the baccalaureate exams, the official diploma accredited by the French minister of National Education. It is recognised for accessing institutes of higher education in France and in Europe as well as gaining a university education in Switzerland, on the basis of a successful French Baccalaureat, but not on the basis of a Swiss Matura.

A new baccalauréat was introduced for the 2018-19 academic year. The new bac général includes six obligatory core subjects: French, two foreign languages, sport, history-geography and a new subject called humanités scientifiques and numériques. In the second year of lycée, students can choose three speciality subjects from a wide-ranging list. In the third year, they continue with two speciality subjects.

The 2021 baccalaureate is partly based on continuous assessment and partly on final examinations. As before, students will take the French exam (written and oral) at the end of the second year. They will then sit the exam for each of the two speciality subjects immediately after the spring school holiday in the final year. Finally the philosophy and oral exam (le grand oral) will take place at the end of the third school year. The 20-minute oral exam is based on a project studied in the final two years.

== History ==
The Lycée Français Marie Curie de Zurich (LFZ) is an establishment in Switzerland that forms part of the Agency for French Education Abroad (AEFE). It has more than 1,140 students.

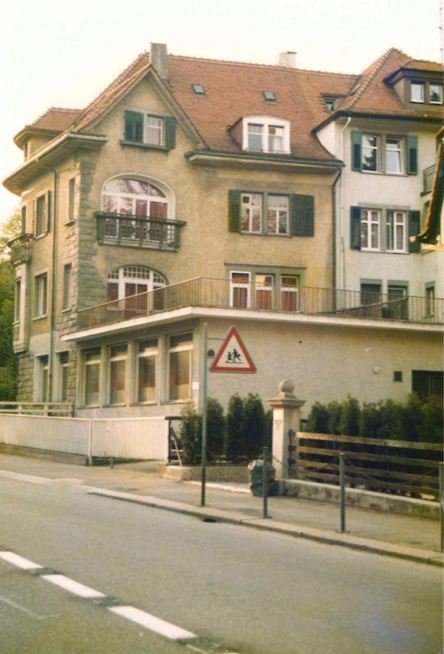
Ecole Française de Zurich, Bergstrasse

Founded on 5 June 1955 by a group of parents, the French school taught its first class on the premises of the Catholic Mission on Hottingerstrasse. Jeanne Obrecht, a qualified French teacher, taught 14 pupils aged between 5 and 10 (and of four different nationalities). The group of parent volunteers applied to the cantonal and municipal school authorities to obtain the necessary permits. The Association de l'école française was founded on 12 January 1956 and raised most of its funds through donations. At the beginning of the second school year in October 1956, the school welcomed 26 primary school pupils, 7 secondary school students and a new teacher. However, the education authority of the Canton of Zurich decided to exclude Swiss children from the French school. In June, the parents' association lodged an appeal against this decision. After a year of negotiations, the school was authorised to accept Swiss pupils under certain conditions and was finally recognised as a private school.

The number of students increased and the board of governors decided to buy a private house in 1959 on Rütistrasse. The French School moved into this villa in 1960. The building was gradually transformed into a modern school (addition of a gymnasium, larger classrooms, etc.) and was officially inaugurated on 30 April 1960. In 1976, the opening of secondary school classes increased the number of students to about 200, forcing the school to rent a neighbouring house to accommodate several classes. The governors therefore considered moving.

The number of pupils continued to grow and in 1978 the governors, a group of parents and the headmaster, Joseph Goldschmidt, chose Gockhausen, a village near Zurich, for a new building with a capacity of 275 pupils.

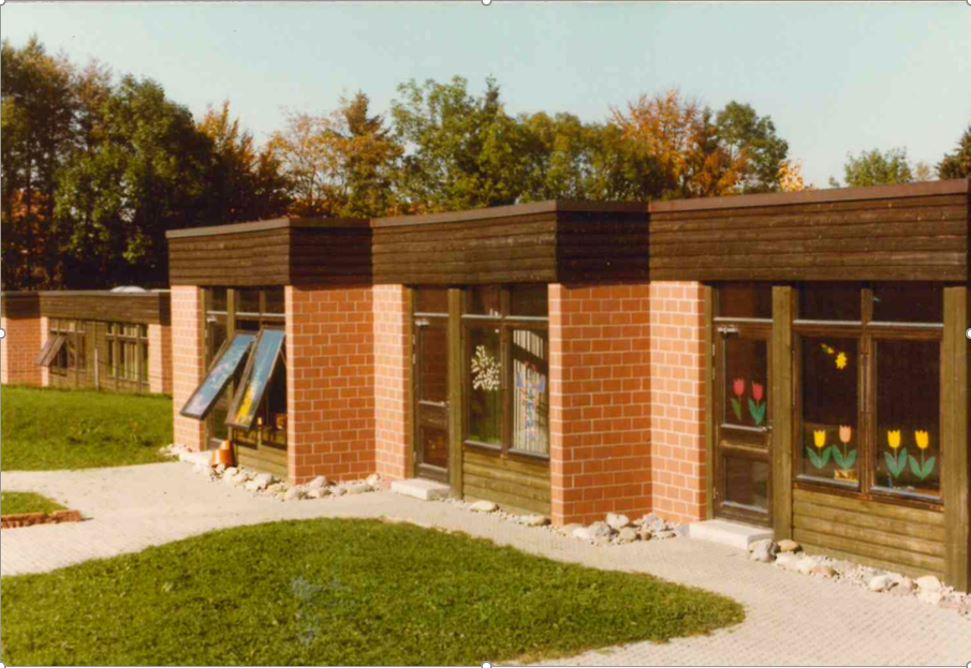
Lycée Français de Zurich im Tobelacker (Gockhausen)

In 1980 it moved into "im Tobelacker 22" in the village of Gockhausen, near the centre of Zurich.

In 1989, France authorised the French school to take the name "Lycée Français de Zurich" (LFZ).

In 1990, the agency AEFE was set up to support French lycées abroad in order to ensure a good education for students and to strengthen the links between the French and foreign education systems.

In 1995, the French baccalaureate finally opened the doors to Swiss universities for lycée students provided they had an average of more than 12 out of 20.

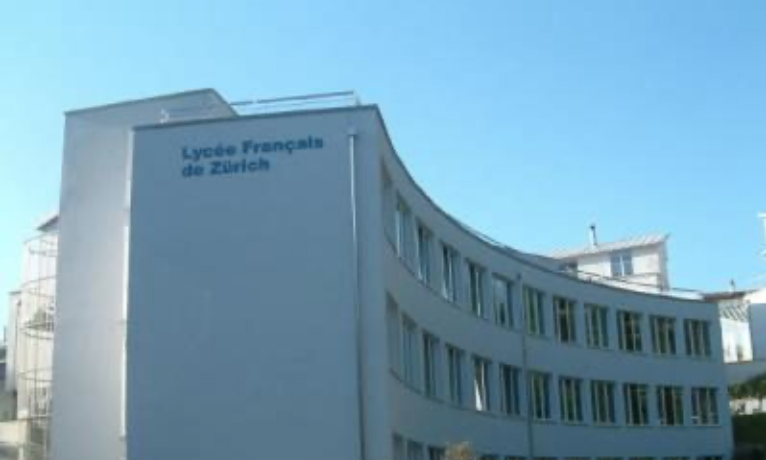
Lycée Français de Zurich at Ursprung (Gockhausen)

The number of pupils at the French lycée continued to rise and it was not until November 2001 that the general assembly of parents approved by a large majority the project to build a new building on Ursprungstrasse 10, in Gockhausen.

The number of students doubled between 2003 and 2010 and the students were spread over four locations: the kindergarten moved to Stettbach (in 2007), the primary school remained in Tobelacker, the Ursprung building was reserved for the lower secondary, and the upper secondary occupied rented space in the SAWI building (in 2011).

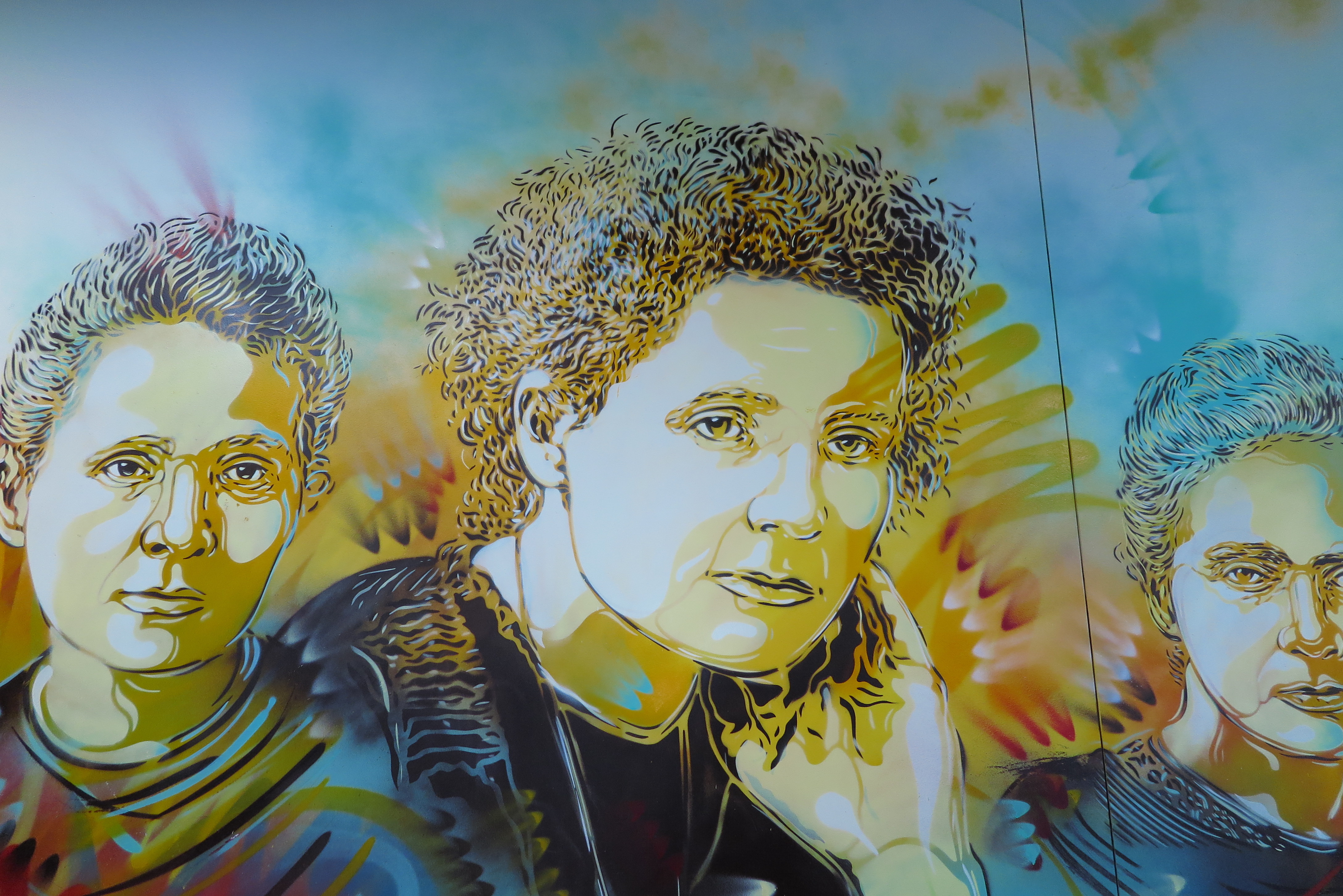
Street art on a wall of the lfz by artist C215 Christian Guémy

At the start of the 2011 school year, the number of pupils at the LFZ increased to over 700. The school developed its German language programme and set up a French-German bilingual programme in the infant school section officially recognised by the Education Department of the Canton of Zurich.

In November 2012 at a general assembly, the parents' association approved the decision to construct a building with a capacity of 1,100 pupils.

In September 2014 the foundation stone for the new building was laid in Dübendorf. Two years later, the LFZ officially moved and opened its doors in September 2016.

In 2017, the LFZ was awarded the title of "Swiss Building of the Year " and passed the 1000-pupil mark.

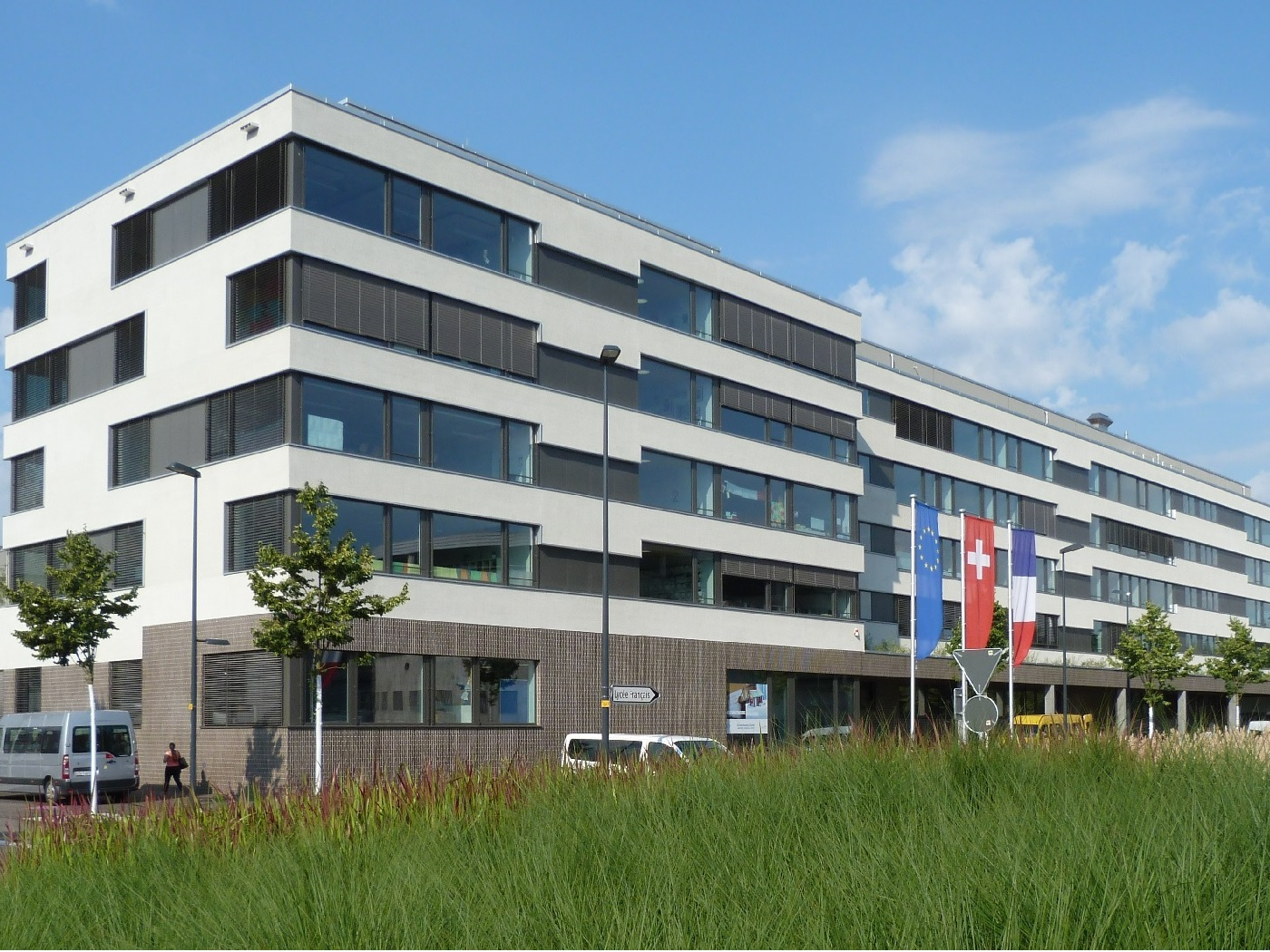
New Lycée Français Marie Curie de Zurich, Zukunftstrasse 1

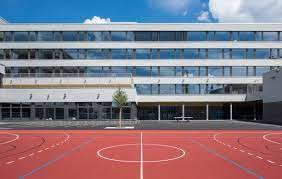
New Lycée Français Marie Curie de Zurich

In 2021 the school became an examination centre for the new baccalauréat and the diplôme national du brevet.

The school aims to be ecologically sustainable and at the cutting edge of technology.

In 2024, the school hosted the first edition of the "Jeux Sportifs de la ZECO", a sports competition between students in the 8th Grade, bringing together students from 12 different schools across Europe.

== Headmasters (Proviseurs) ==
- Joseph Goldschmidt (1977-1980)
- Yves Marandet (1980-1983)
- Jean Paul Portzer (1983-1989)
- René Leleu (1989-1995)
- Nelly Portela (1995-1996)
- Christine Magère (1997-1999)
- Claudine Lebourgeois (2000-2005)
- Jean-Luc Drussel (2006-2011)
- Brigitte Renn (2011-2015)
- Paul Savall (2015-2020)
- Laurent Strupler (2020-2022)
- Quentin Duvauchelle (from September 2022)

== Languages at the LFZ ==
- Bilingual French-German curriculum or classic French curriculum in primary schools
- English taught from CE2
- Optional teaching of Spanish from the 6th grade
- Optional teaching of Latin from the 6th grade

The bilingual pathway was introduced in September 2011 for infant and primary school pupils. Each subject is taught in French and German to ensure joint development of skills. This bilingual curriculum at the LFZ is recognised and authorised by the Education Authority (Bildungsdirektion). It is also compatible with the curriculum of the Canton of Zurich and French National Education.

The school belongs to the PASCH network and is a DSD-Schule, i.e. an examination centre for the German DSD certification. It is also an examination centre for the English language certification IELTS and the Spanish language certifications DELE (Diploma de Español como Lengua Extranjera) and SIELE (Servicio Internacional de Evaluación de la Lengua Española).

== Digital education at the LFZ ==
In response to the law on orientation and programming for the refounding of the Republic’s schools (Loi d'Orientation et de Programmation pour la Refondation de l'Ecole de la République), which demands schools enter the digital age, the Lycée (Français de Zurich) equipped each student with a tablet in April 2016 in two pilot classes: one class in CM2 (elementary) and another in Spanish 27 (secondary). The school's educational management team appointed François Latouche, head teacher of the primary school, as project manager. Teachers of all grades were equipped with a laptop and tablet and given training sessions. Conferences were organised for families to raise awareness of and inform them about the project. One of them, in June 2017, led by Emmanuel Davidenkoff, author of "Le tsunami numérique", convinced many parents. From September 2017, all pupils from CP to Terminale received a tablet for educational activities. At the nursery and infants school, each teacher uses 6 tablets per class for pupils in years 1 and 2.
