= Uster =

- Municipality
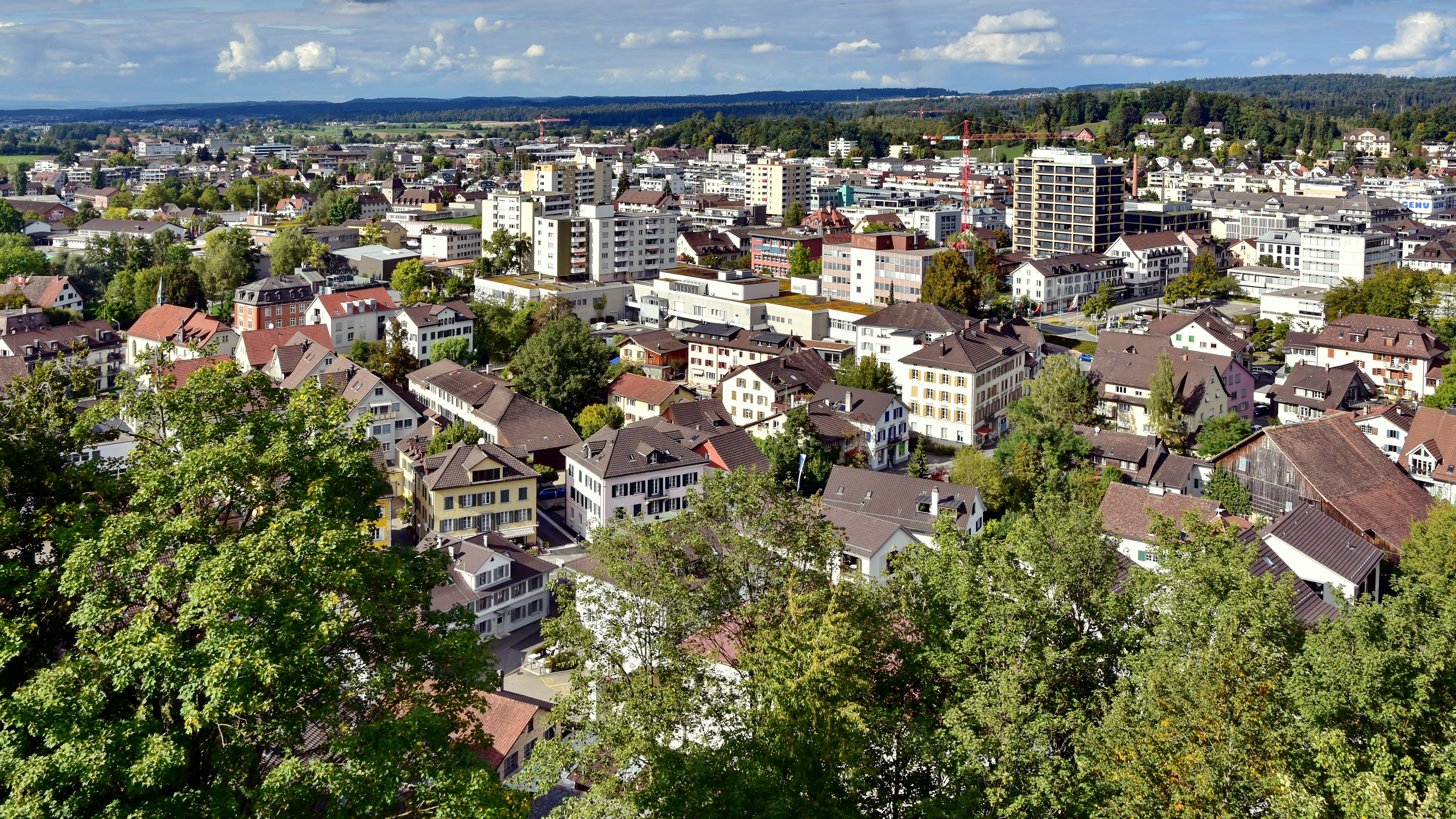

- Flag Coat of arms
- Location of Uster
- Location within Switzerland Location within Canton of Zürich
- Coordinates: 47°21′N 8°43′E
- Country: Switzerland
- Canton: Zürich
- District: Uster

Government
  - Executive: Stadtrat with 7 members
  - Mayor: Stadtpräsidentin (list); Barbara Thalmann Stammbach SPS/PSS (as of July 2018)
  - Parliament: Gemeinderat with 36 members

Area
  - Total: 28.56 km^{2} (11.03 sq mi)
- Elevation: 462 m (1,516 ft)

Population (December 2020)
  - Total: 35,337
  - Density: 1,237/km^{2} (3,205/sq mi)
- Demonym: Ustermer
- Time zone: UTC+01:00 (CET)
  - Summer (DST): UTC+02:00 (CEST)
- Postal code: 8610
- SFOS number: 198
- ISO 3166 code: CH-ZH
- Localities: Kirchuster, Freudwil, Nänikon, Niederuster, Nossikon, Oberuster, Riedikon, Sulzbach, Wermatswil, Werrikon, Winikon-Gschwader
- Surrounded by: Fehraltorf, Gossau, Greifensee, Maur, Mönchaltorf, Pfäffikon, Seegräben, Volketswil
- Twin towns: Prenzlau (Germany)
- Website: www.uster.ch

Uster (Swiss Standard German pronunciation: [ˈʊstər]; Zurich German: Uschter, pronounced [uʃːtər]) is a town and the capital of the Uster District in the Swiss canton of Zürich.

The importance of the town of Uster has grown considerably with the construction of the S-Bahn network of the Zürich Transport Network. With over 36,000 inhabitants, it is the third largest town in the canton and is one of the twenty largest towns in Switzerland. Along with Wetzikon, it forms one of the two centres of the Zürcher Oberland. Uster is located next to a lake, called Greifensee.

The town of Uster received the Wakker Prize in 2001.

== History ==
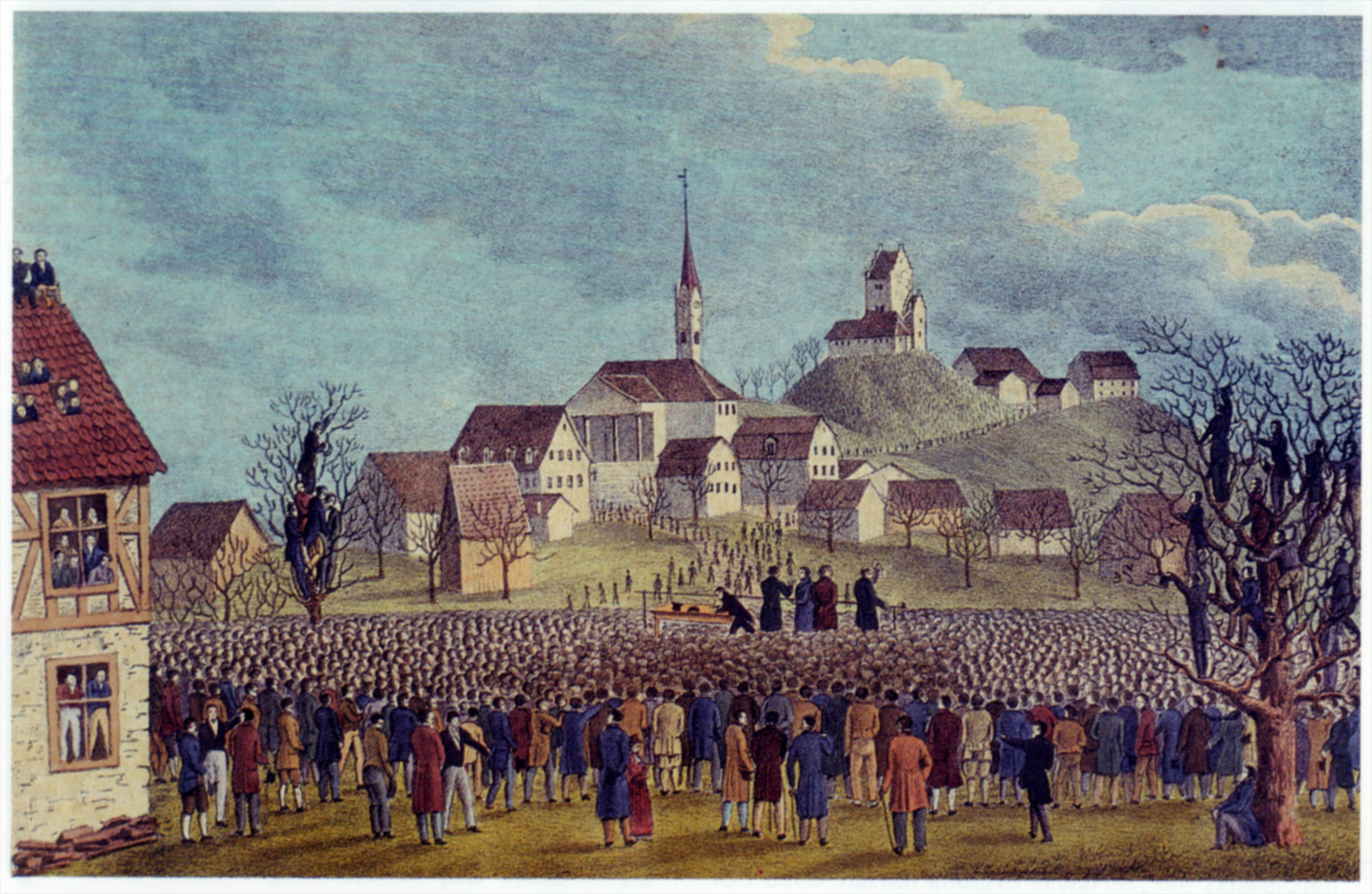
Ustertag on 22 November 1830, the castle and the church in the background

The village of Riedikon was first mentioned in year 741, while Uster was first mentioned in 775, as Ustra villa. The toponym has been explained as reflecting Old High German *ustrâ or *uster-aha "voracious [river]" by Boesch (1978). First mentioned in 1099, the donation of the St. Andreas Church was given by the House of Rapperswil as a spacious three-naved country church. The Burg Uster (castle) was first mentioned in 1267, as being in the possession of the Freiherr von Bonstetten. On 7 January 1300 Elisabeth von Rapperswil sold the pledge of the reign Greifensee to the knight Hermann II. von Landenberg, including the Greifensee castle, the town and the lake of the same name, and a larger number of farms, as well as the pastoral rights (Kirchrecht) in Uster. In 1438 the church rights (Kirchrecht) were sold to the Rüti Monastery. The church was considered as a part of the so-called "Laubishof" estate that possibly was located at the nearby plateau where the Uster Castle is situated.

During the Old Zürich War, in May 1444, the Old Swiss Confederacy laid siege to the nearby town of Greifensee, held by about 70 defenders, most of them inhabitants of the Amt Greifensee, and a few Habsburg and Zürich soldiers. The town was captured after four weeks, on May 27, and all but two of the surviving 64 defenders were beheaded on the next day, including the leader, Wildhans von Breitenlandenberg. Even in times of war, mass execution was widely considered a cruel and unjust deed. On May 29, the Castle of Greifensee and the city walls were broken.

Among many other transfers of lands and goods, on 25 April 1448 Beringer von Landemberg von Griffensee confirmed, with permission of his sons Hug and Beringer dem Jungen that at the place where all his ancestors have been buried, a long list of money, goods and lands have to be transferred to the church as a benefice. In 1473 the church comrades, based on an older Jahrzeitbuch (Latin: libri anniversariorum) which now is lost, created a new one which is among the best preserved of the Canton of Zürich. With the dissolution of the monastery Ruti during the Reformation in Zürich its rights fell on the government of the city of Zürich in 1525. In 1824 the new Reformed church was consecrated.

On 22 November 1830 about 10,000 men of the canton of Zürich gathered near Uster and demanded a new constitution. This assembly, known as the Ustertag, together with other assemblies in Switzerland led to the Restoration and the creation of the Swiss Federal State. Twelve swimmers died when the roof of an indoor pool collapsed in 1985.

== Geography ==
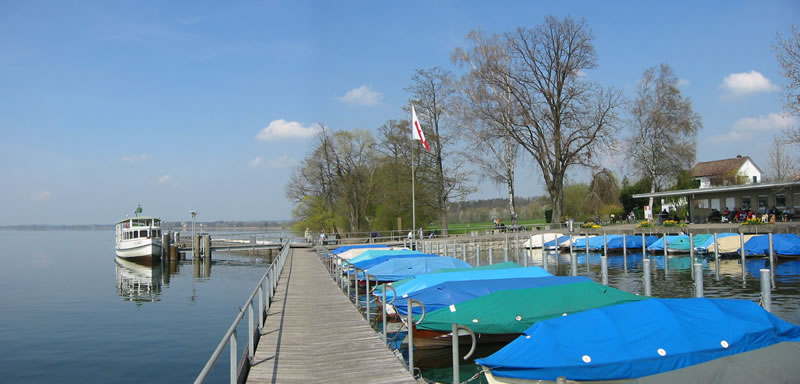
Niederuster, located at the Greifensee

Aerial view (1971)

Uster has an area of 28.5 km^{2} (11.0 sq mi). Of this area, 44.4% is used for agricultural purposes, while 27.1% is forested. Of the rest of the land, 26.2% is settled (buildings or roads) and the remainder (2.3%) is non-productive (rivers, glaciers or mountains). In 1996 housing and buildings made up 18.4% of the total area, while transportation infrastructure made up the rest (7.8%). Of the total unproductive area, water (streams and lakes) made up 0.4% of the area. As of 2007 22.2% of the total municipal area was undergoing some type of construction.

== Demographics ==
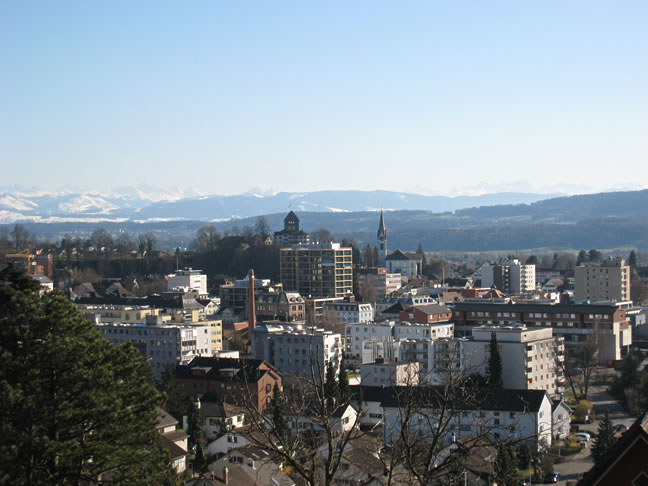
Uster panorama with Uster castle

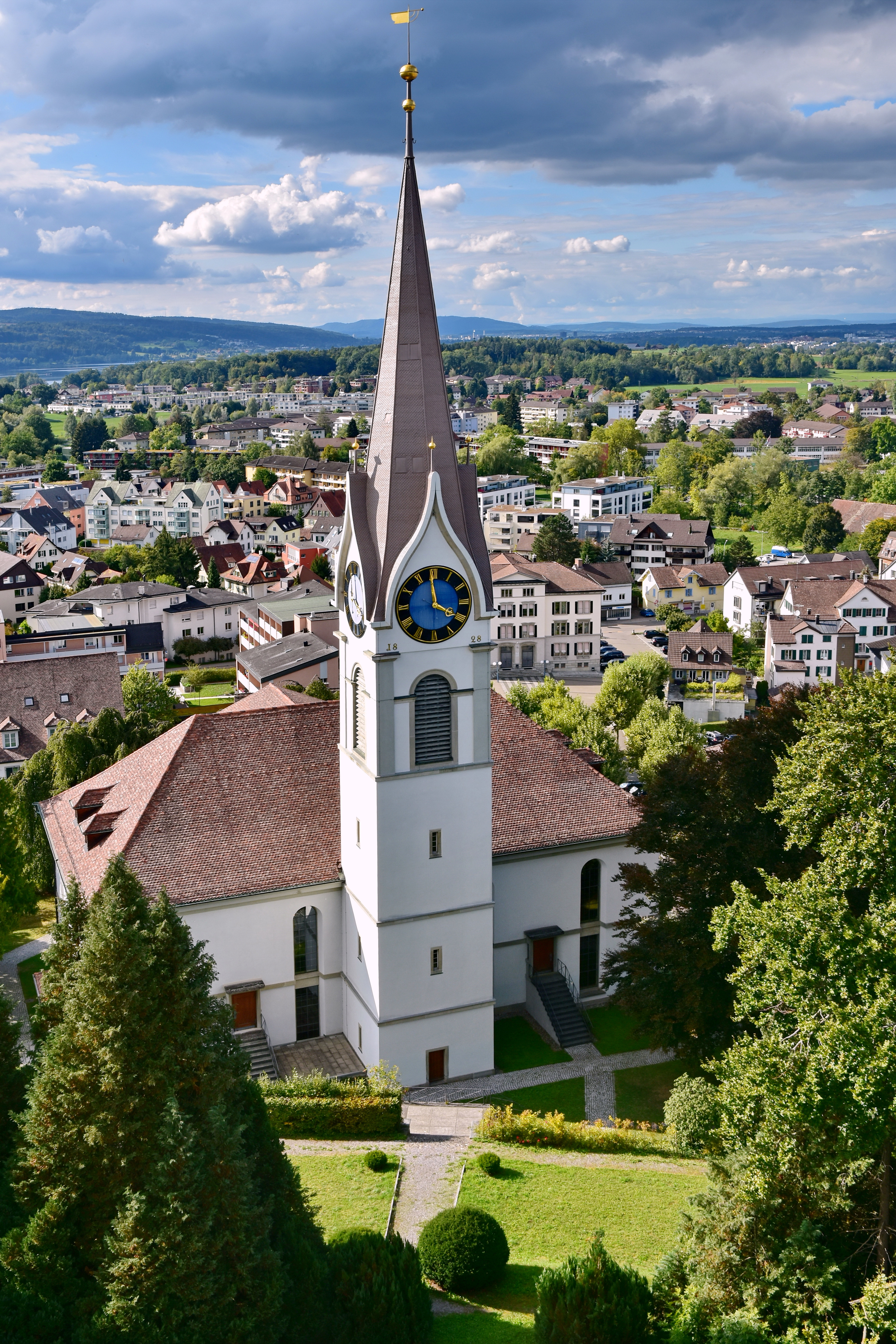
Uster Reformed Church as seen from the tower of the Schloss

Uster has a population (as of 31 December 2020) of 35,337. As of 2007, 21.6% of the population was made up of foreign nationals.As of 2008 the gender distribution of the population was 49.6% male and 50.4% female. Over the last 10 years the population has grown at a rate of 14.2%. Most of the population (as of 2000) speaks German (85.0%), with Italian being second most common ( 4.5%) and Albanian being third ( 1.7%).

| Nationalities in Uster | 12-31-2010 | 12-31-2015 |
|---|---|---|
| Switzerland | 78,67 % | 77,38 % |
| Germany | 4,53 % | 5,02 % |
| Italy | 4,06 % | 3,92 % |
| Portugal | 1,55 % | 1,76 % |
| Kosovo | 0,76 % | 1,56 % |
| North Macedonia | 0,95 % | 0,91 % |
| Turkey | 0,94 % | 0,87 % |
| Spain | 0,64 % | 0,85 % |
| Austria | 0,76 % | 0,73 % |
| Serbia | 1,42 % | 0,70 % |

In the 2007 election the most popular party was the SVP which received 31.3% of the vote. The next three most popular parties were the SPS (20.6%), the CSP (13.3%) and the Green Party (12.2%).

The age distribution of the population (as of 2000) is children and teenagers (0–19 years old) make up 22.2% of the population, while adults (20–64 years old) make up 65% and seniors (over 64 years old) make up 12.8%. In Uster about 73.9% of the population (between age 25–64) have completed either non-mandatory upper secondary education or additional higher education (either university or a Fachhochschule). There are 12605 households in Uster.

Uster has an unemployment rate of 3.28%. As of 2005, there were 392 people employed in the primary economic sector and about 92 businesses involved in this sector. 3,204 people are employed in the secondary sector and there are 238 businesses in this sector. 9475 people are employed in the tertiary sector, with 1091 businesses in this sector. As of 2007 51.5% of the working population were employed full-time, and 48.5% were employed part-time.

As of 2008 there were 9,366 Catholics and 11,890 Protestants in Uster. In the 2000 census, religion was broken down into several smaller categories. From the census, 45% were some type of Protestant, with 41.8% belonging to the Swiss Reformed Church and 3.3% belonging to other Protestant churches. 31.7% of the population were Catholic. Of the rest of the population, 5.4% were Muslim, 7.2% belonged to another religion (not listed), 3.4% did not give a religion, and 11.7% were atheist or agnostic.

== Weather ==
Uster has an average of 135.4 days of rain per year and on average receives 1,164 mm (45.8 in) of precipitation. The wettest month is June during which time Uster receives an average of 137 mm (5.4 in) of precipitation. During this month there is precipitation for an average of 13.1 days. The driest month of the year is October with an average of 69 mm (2.7 in) of precipitation over 13.1 days.

== Wakker Prize ==
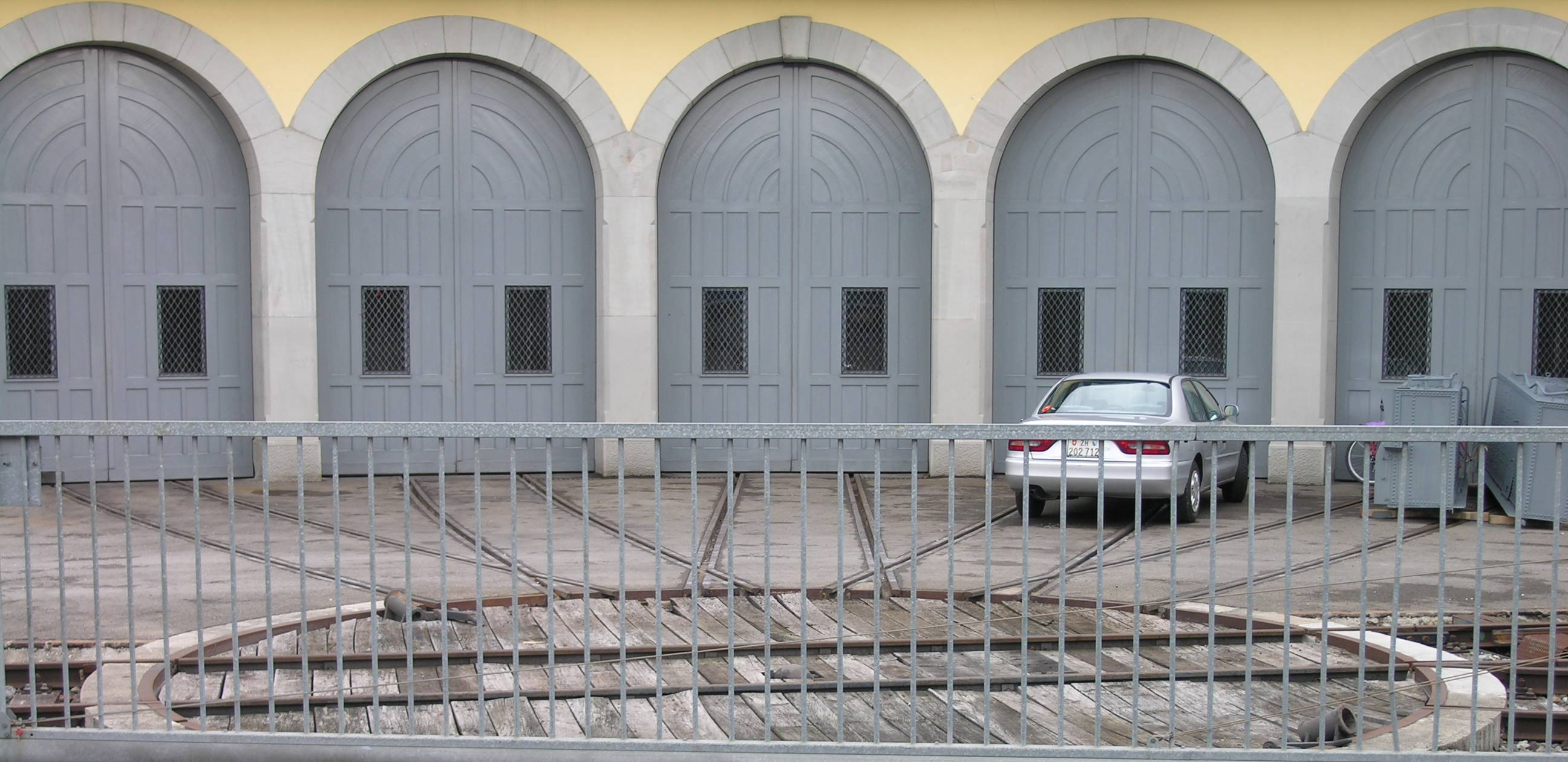
The roundhouse in Uster train station, Switzerland

Uster received the Wakker Prize from the Swiss Heritage Society in 2001 for the city's efforts to maintain an identity within the anonymous Swiss Agglomeration around Zürich. The Society noted that developed land was clearly separated from the neighboring farming land. They praised the efforts that the city had made to integrate old and new buildings and to build with harmonious architectural styles.

== Education ==
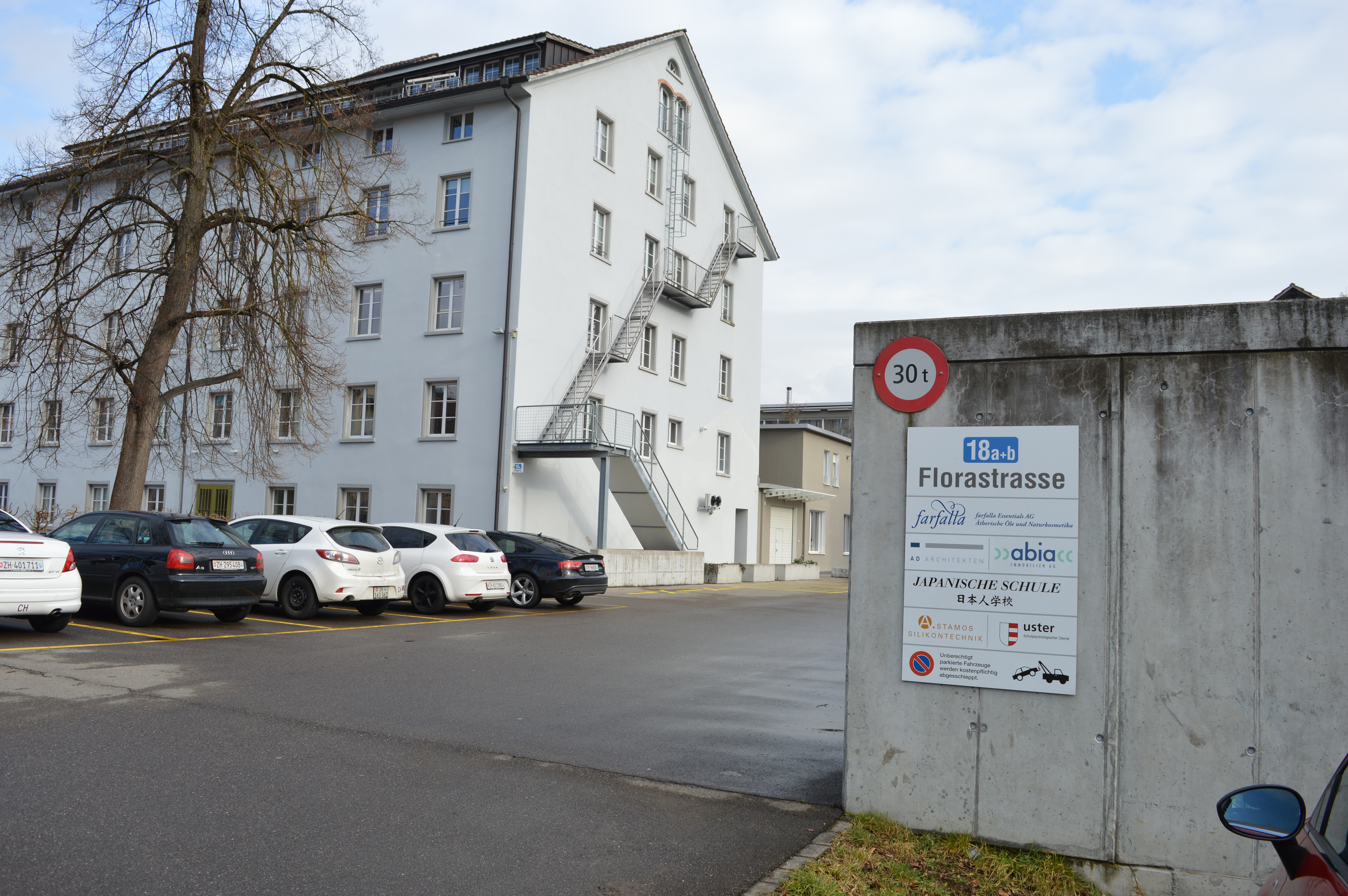
Japanese School in Zurich

Primarschule Uster serves primary school children, while Sekundarschulverwaltung Uster serves students at the secondary school level. The Bildungszentrum Uster includes three institutions: Berufsfachschule Uster (vocational school), Kantonsschule Uster (gymnasium), and Höhere Fachschule Uster.

The Japanese School in Zurich, Switzerland's sole primary and junior high Japanese international day school, is located in Uster.

The Stadt- und Regionalbibliothek Uster and the Stadtarchiv und Kläui Bibliothek are located in the city limits. The Bibliothek Nänikon is located in Nänikon, also in the city limits.

== Notable people ==
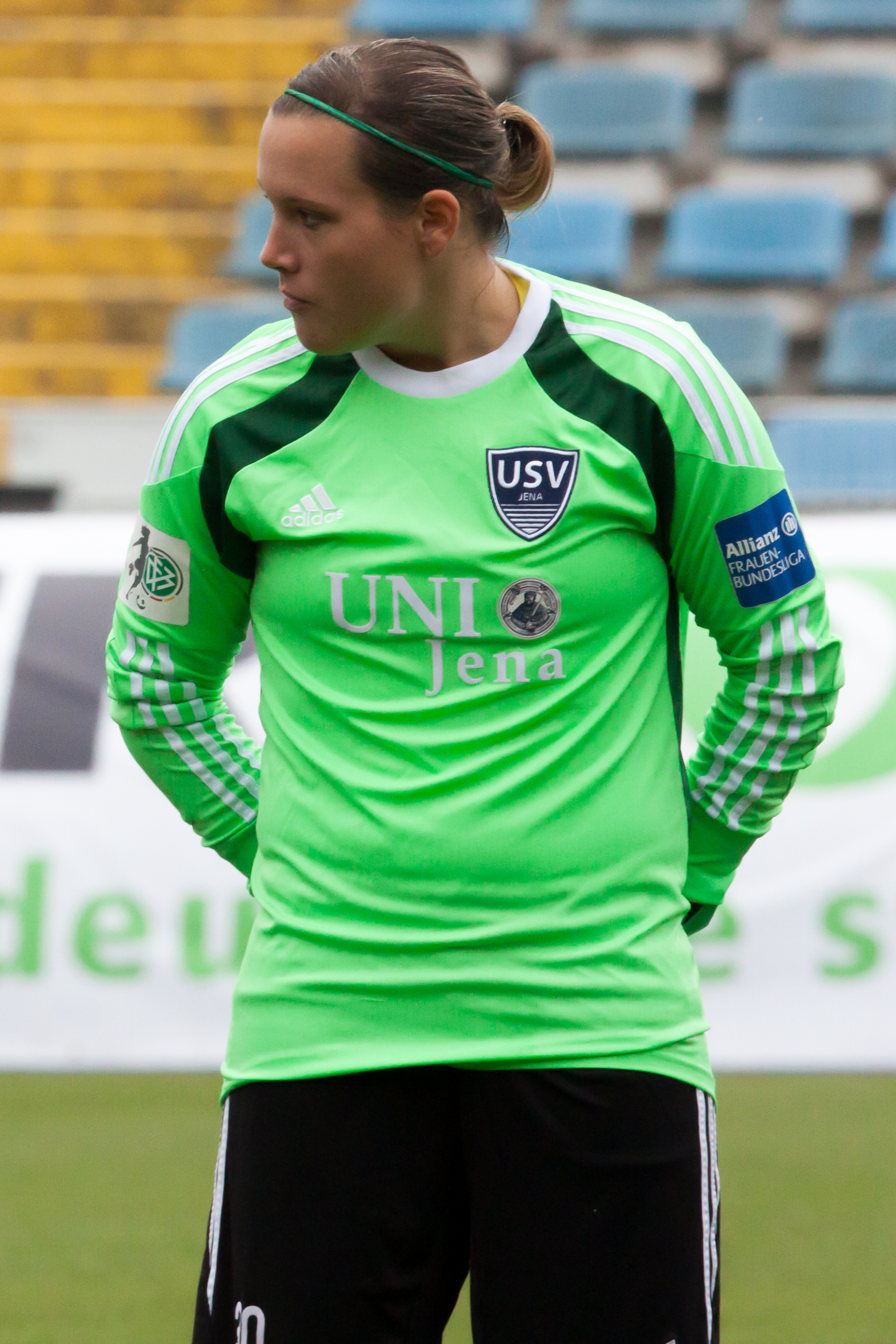
Stenia Michel, 2014

- Leandra Columberg (born 1999), Swiss politician
- Jakob Heusser-Staub (1862–1941) a Swiss industrialist and philanthropist
- Hedi Lang (1931–2004) a Swiss politician, the first woman elected to a cantonal executive
- Adriano B. Lucatelli (born 1966) a Swiss entrepreneur and investor in the financial services industry
- Erich Nigg (born 1952) a Swiss cell biologist
- Fritz Nussbaum (1924–2013) a Swiss athlete, competed in the men's decathlon at the 1948 Summer Olympics
- Giuseppe Mazzarelli (born 1972) a former Swiss footballer, over 300 pro games and 13 for the national team
- Stenia Michel (born 1987) a Swiss footballer who plays as a goalkeeper for FC Basel
- Philippe Montandon (born 1982) a retired footballer over 300 pro games
- Roger Sablonier (1941–2010), historian and writer, University of Zürich faculty
- Roeland Wiesnekker (born 1967) a Dutch/Swiss actor in movies and theater plays
- Sandro Zeller (born 1991) a Swiss racing car driver.

== Transportation ==
The municipality of Uster is served by two railway stations, both of which are served by trains of the Zürich S-Bahn. Uster railway station is in the centre of the city, and is served by lines S9, S14, S15 and S5. Nänikon-Greifensee railway station is on the border with adjoining municipality of Greifensee, and is served only by lines S9 and S14. Uster is a 14-minute ride (S5) from Zürich Hauptbahnhof when travelling on the fastest trains.

== Gallery ==
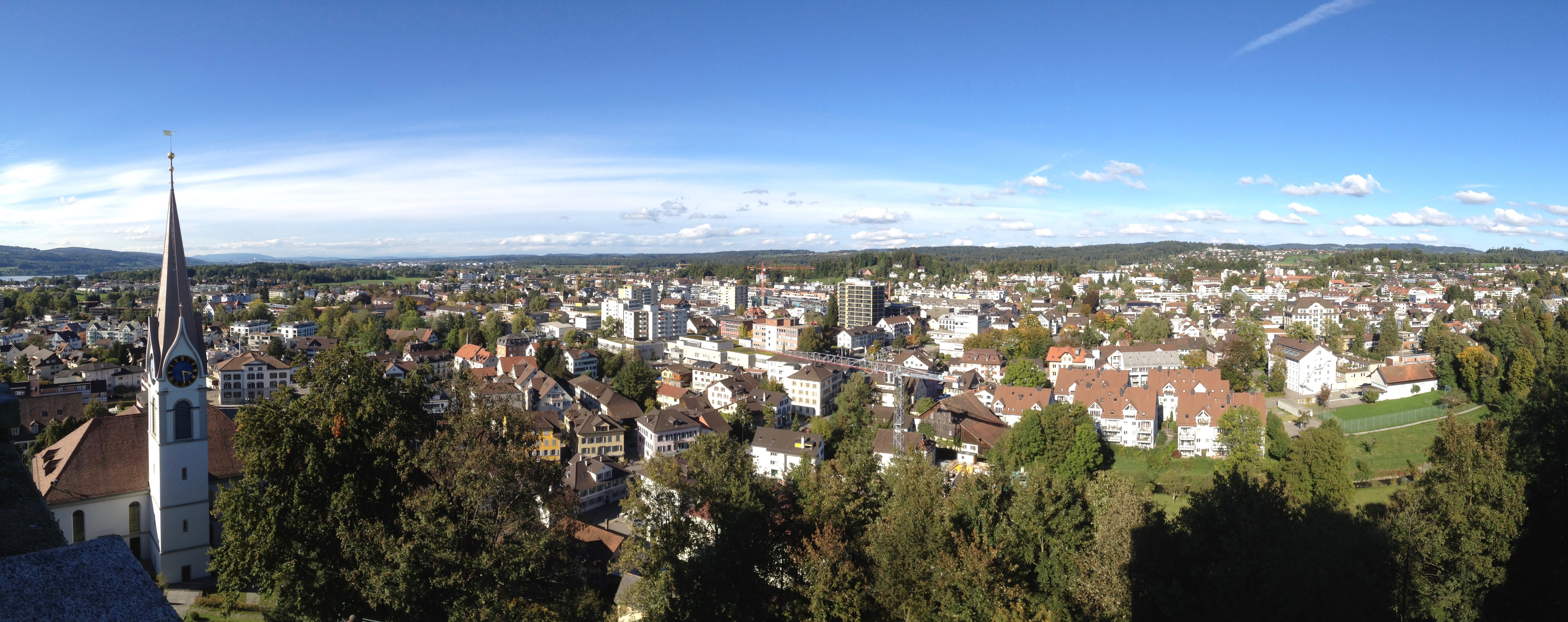
Panorama of the city of Uster photographed from the Uster Castle

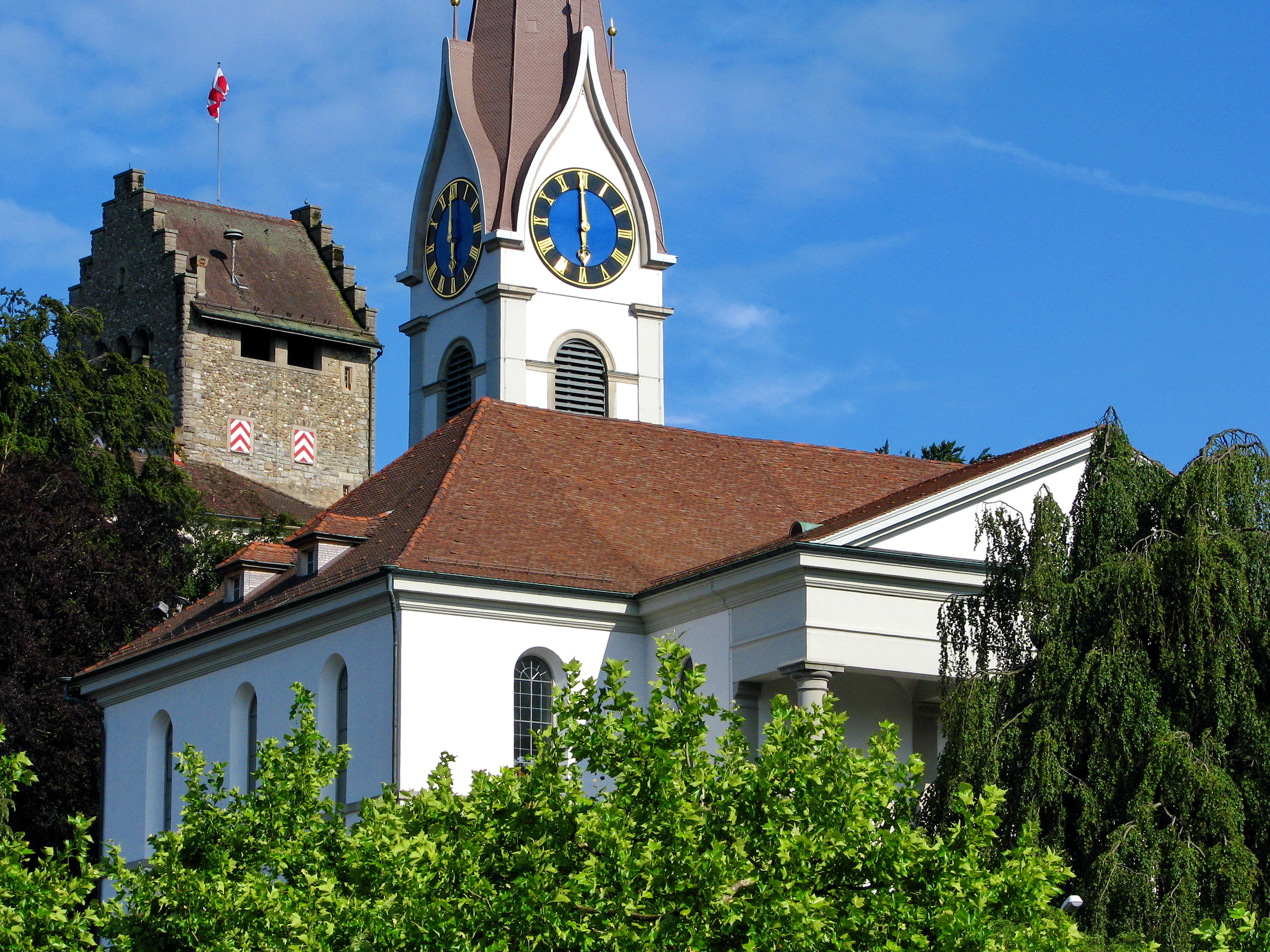
Reformed Church (official) and castle of Uster

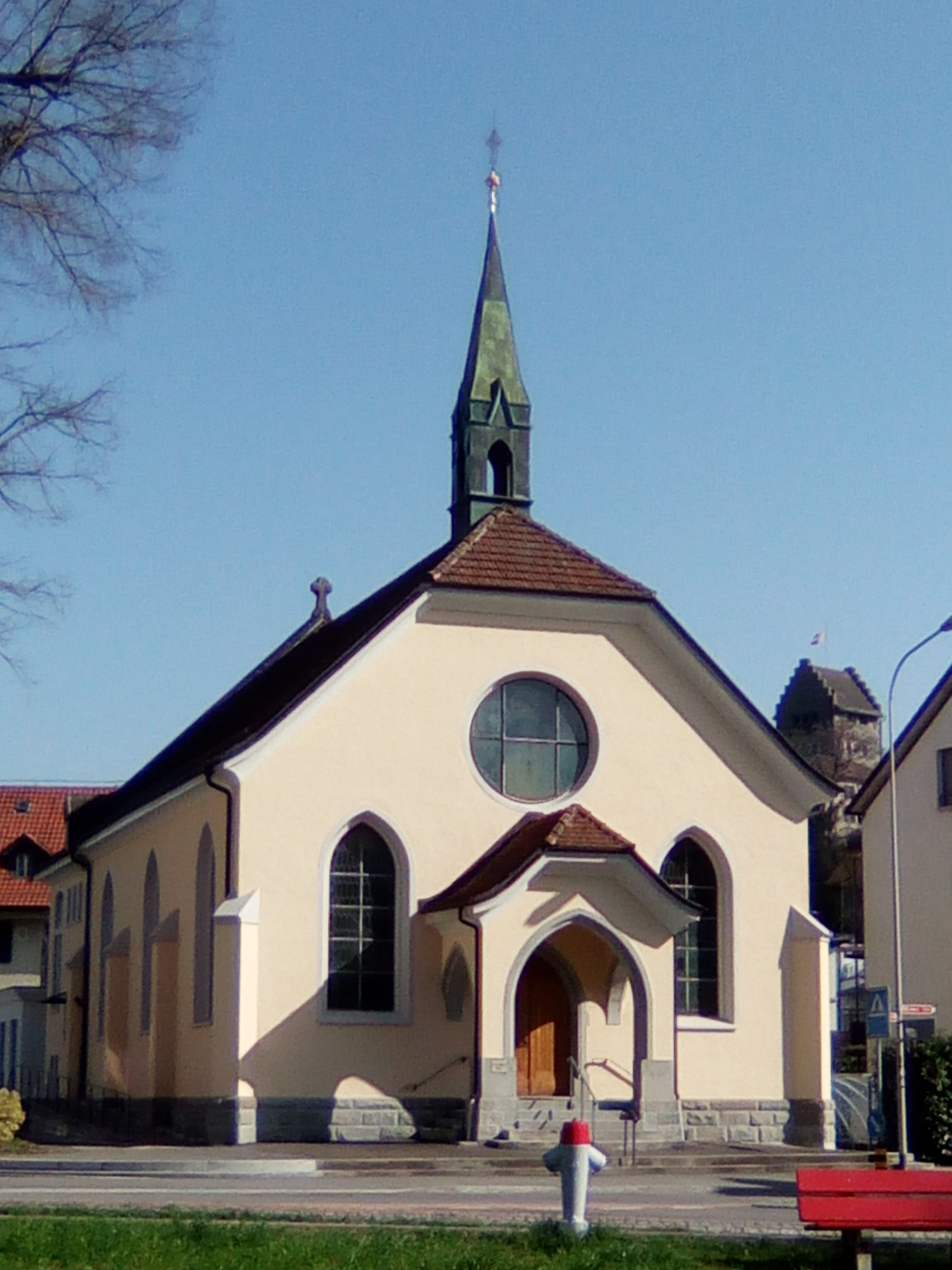
Free Church

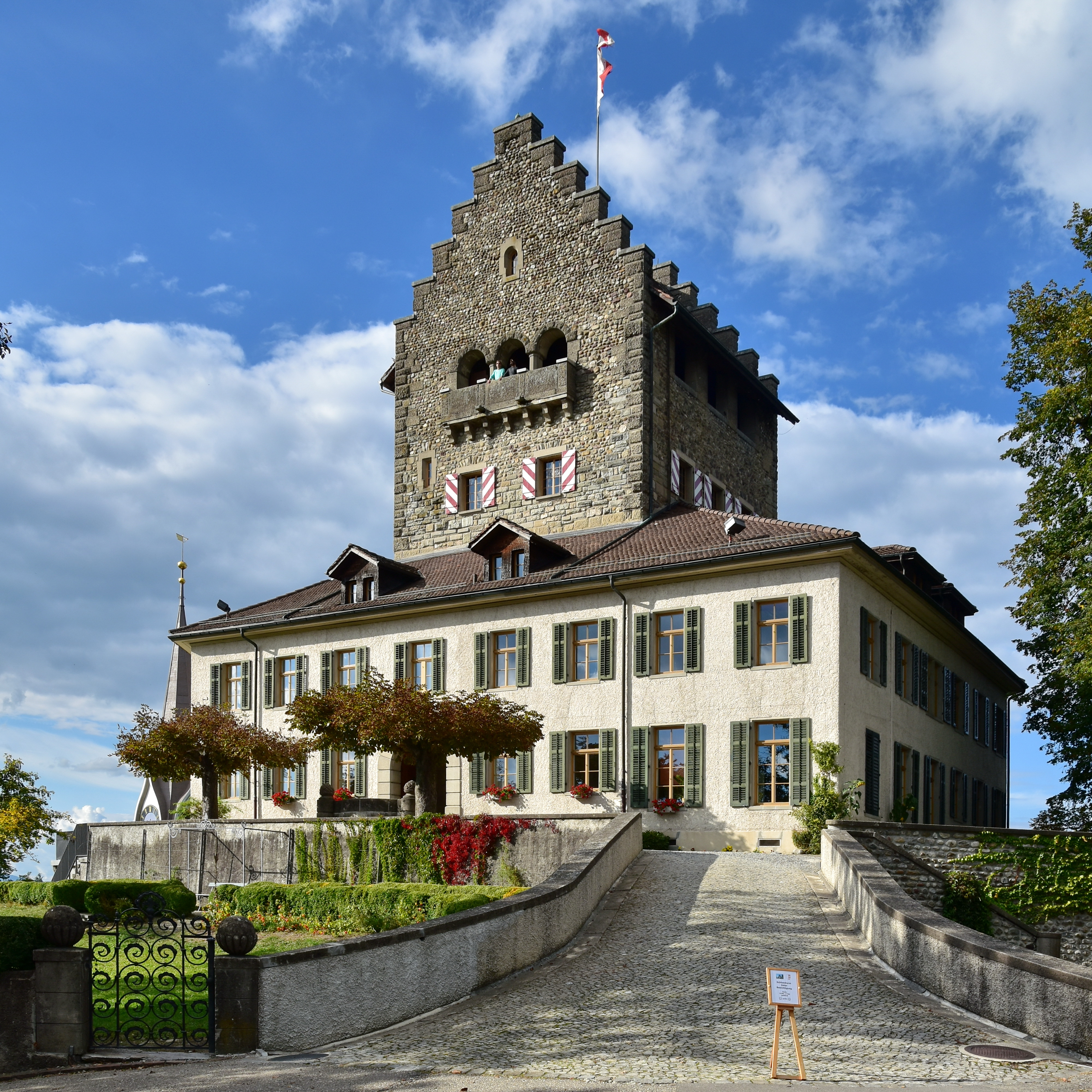
Schloss Uster

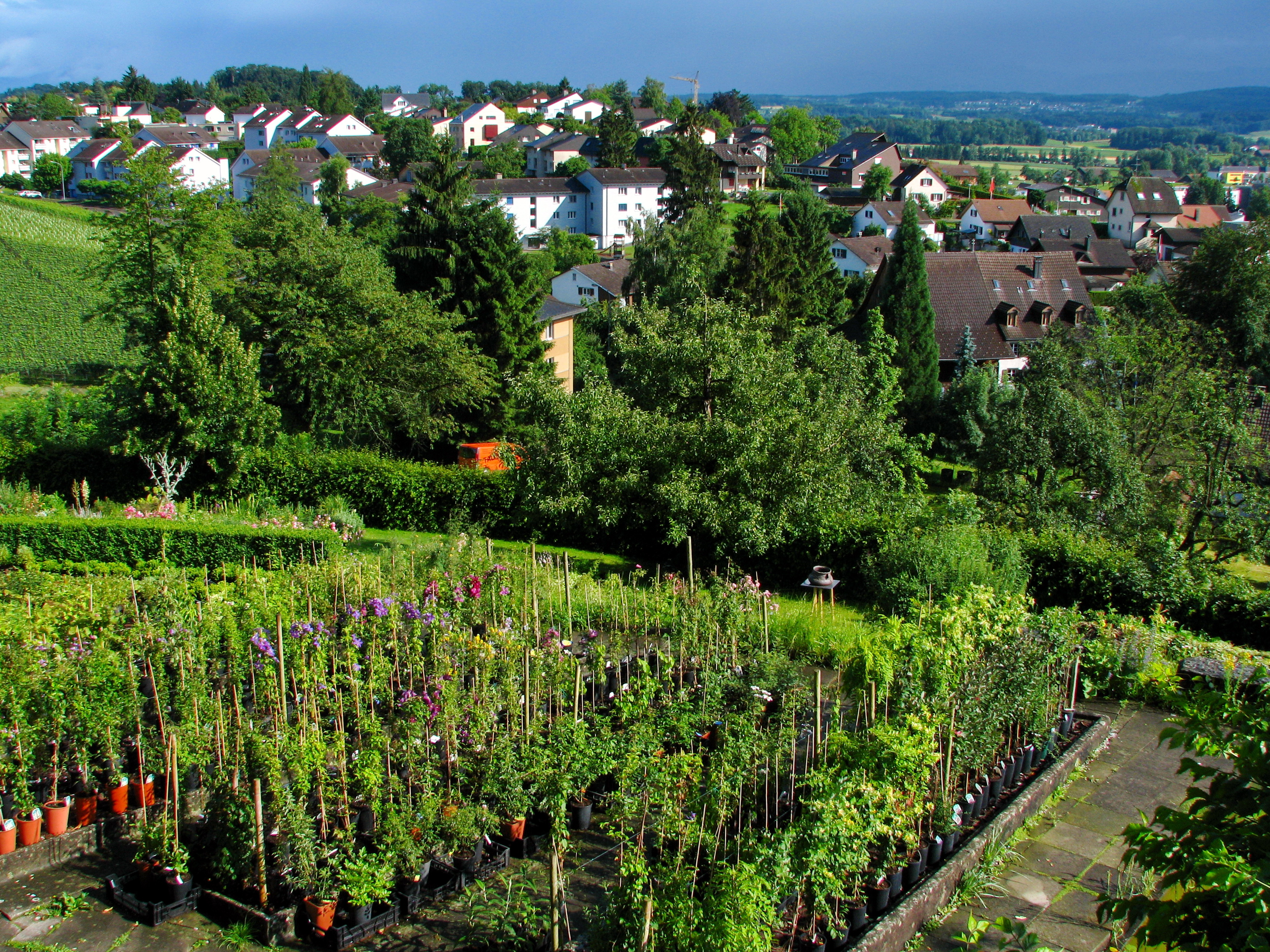
Nossikon and Riedikon (to the right)

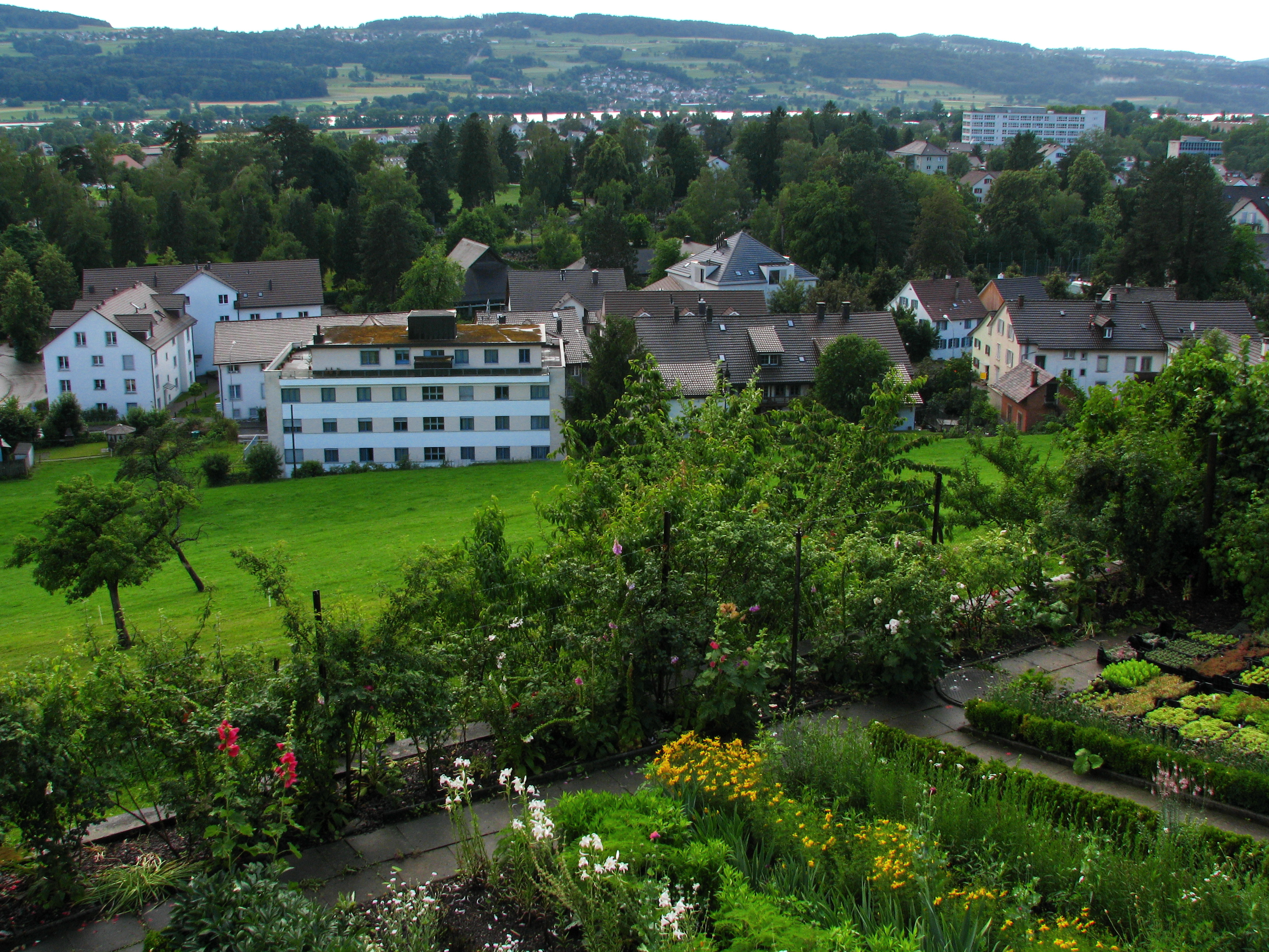
Wil and Niederuster, Greifensee, Pfannenstiel and Forch in the background

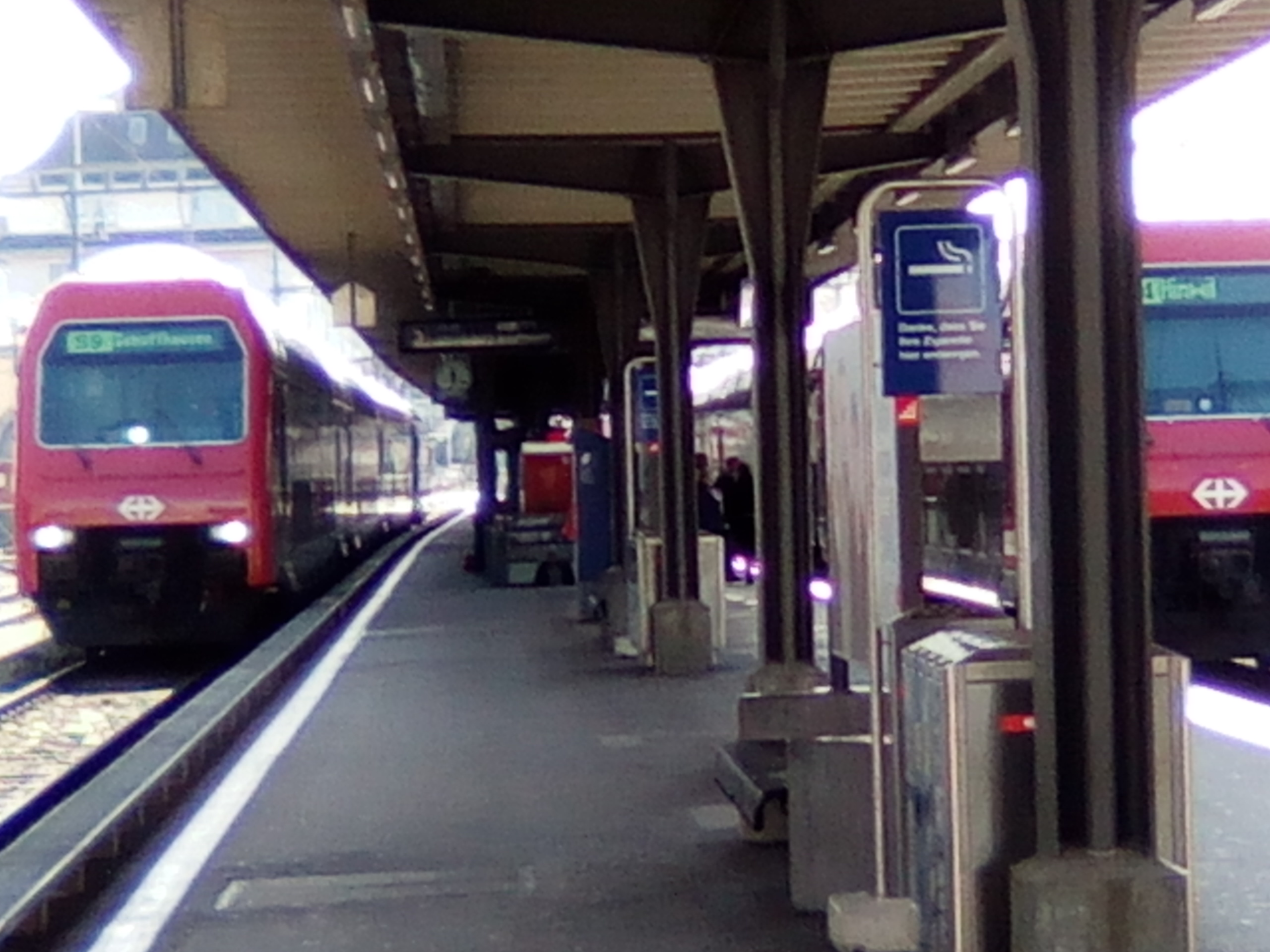
Train station

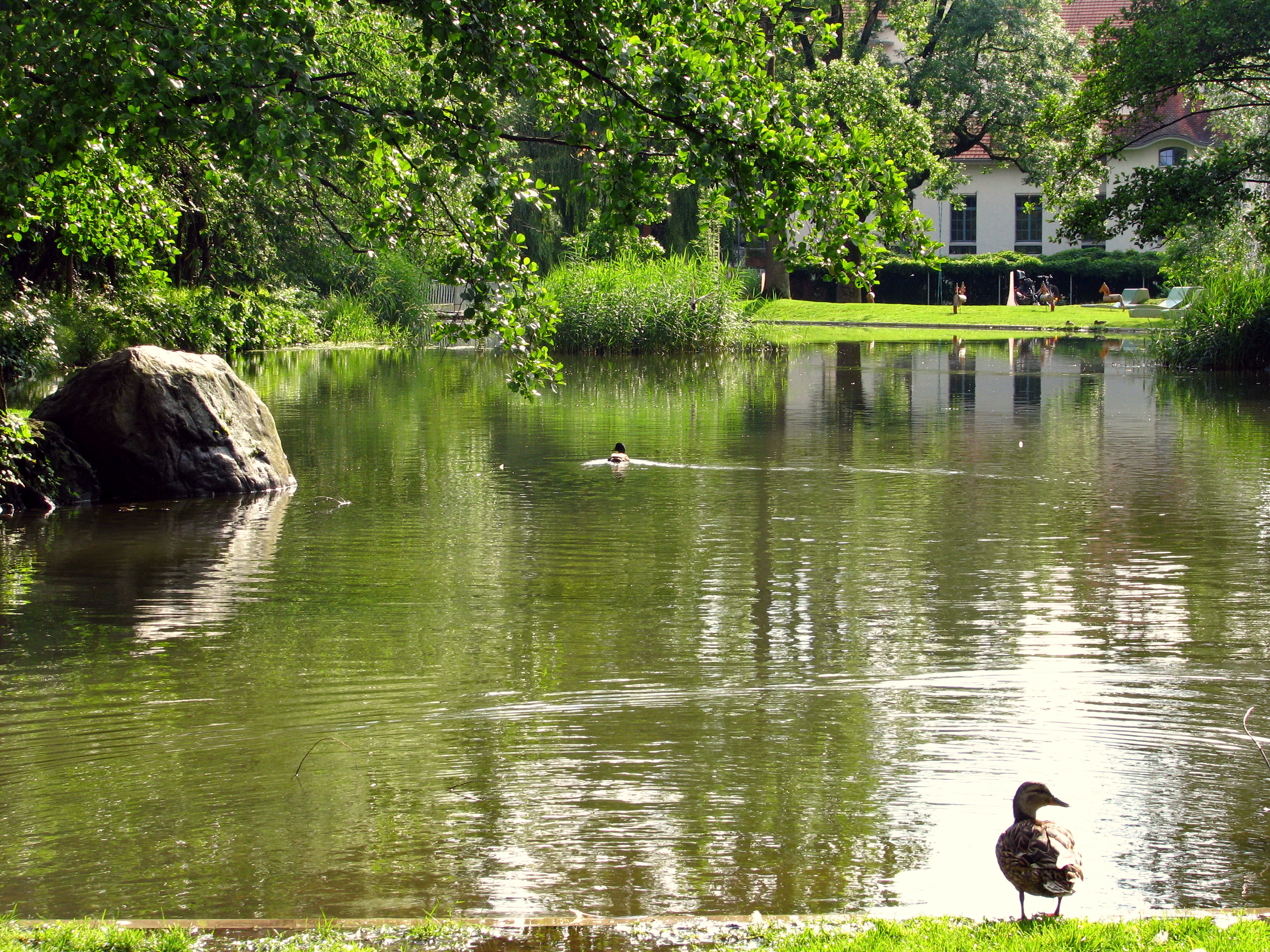
City park

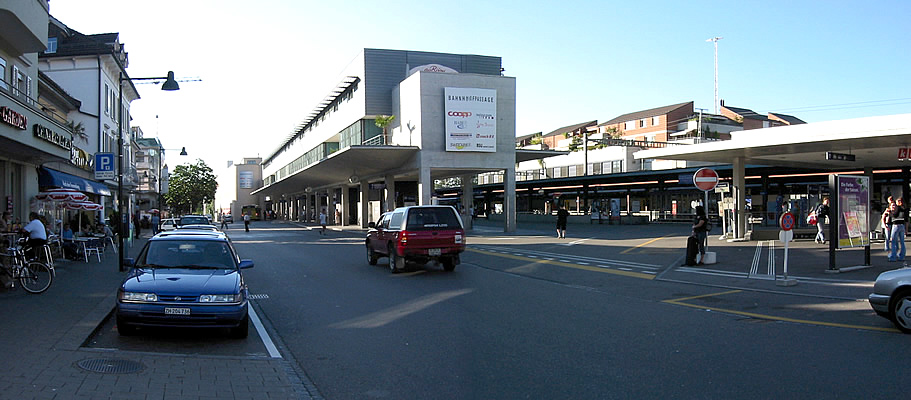
Bus station aside of train station

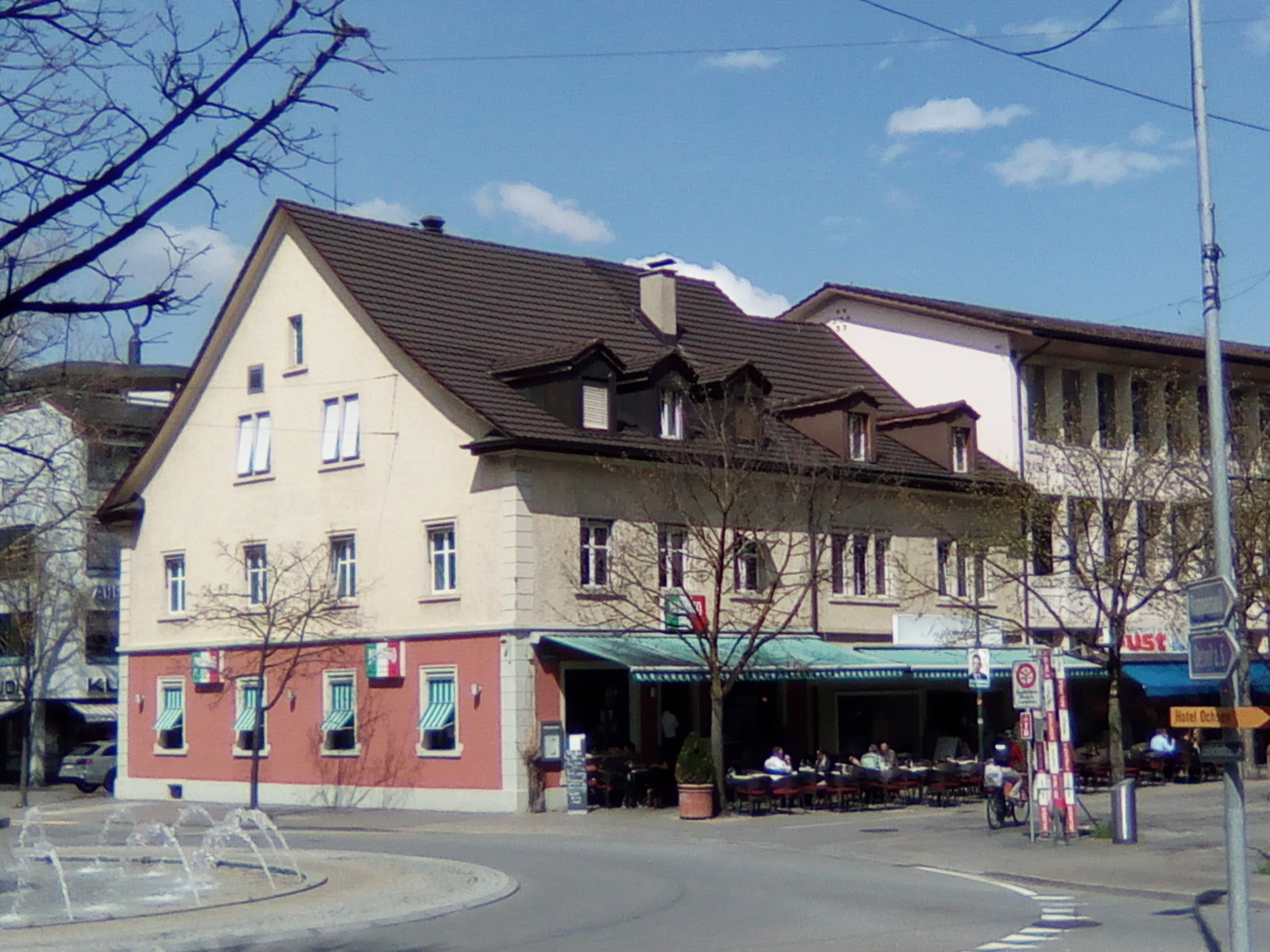
Fountain roundabout with restaurant

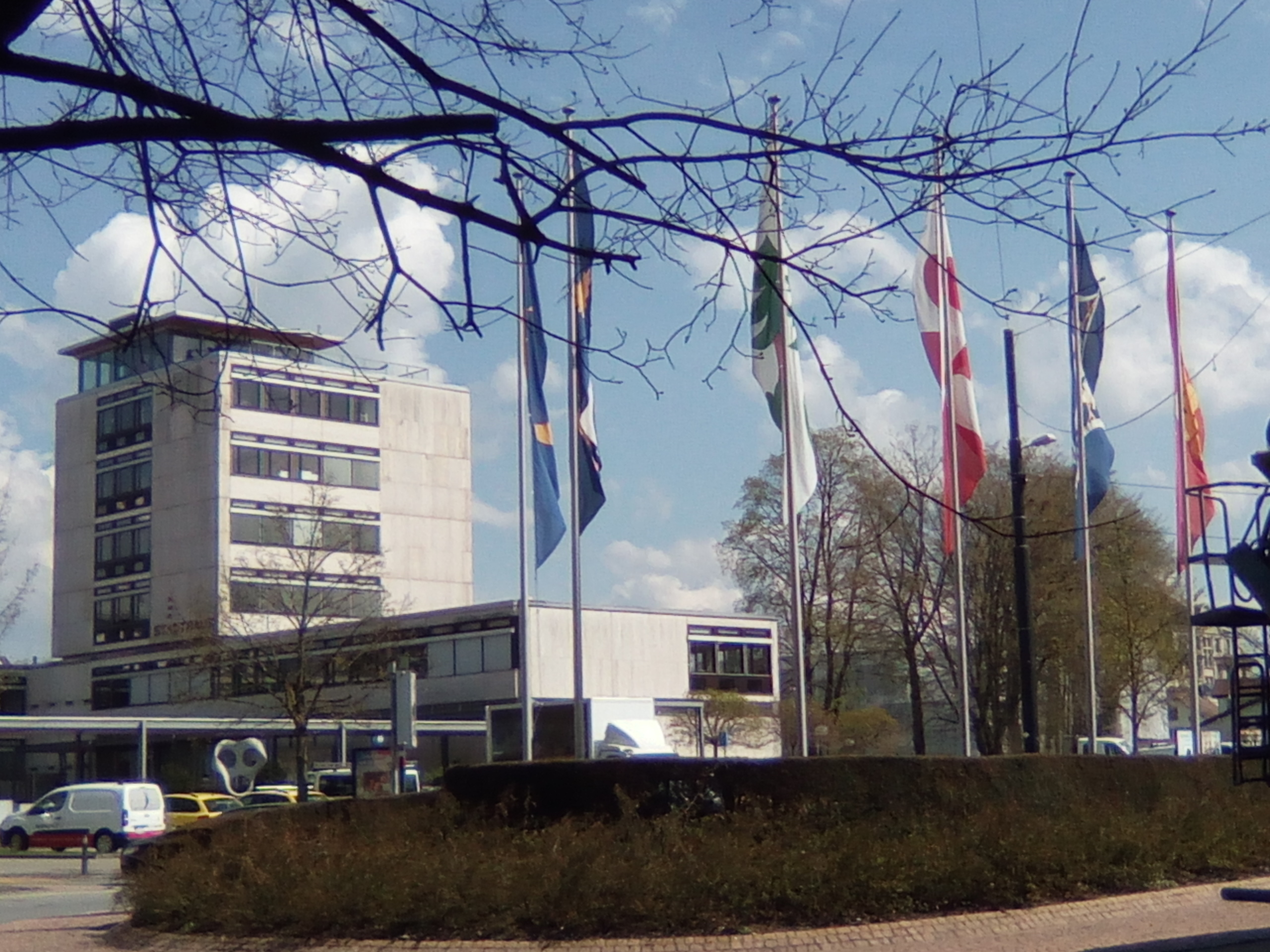
Roundabout near administration building

City Uster from Above
