= Saurer =

Swiss manufacturer

Adolph Saurer AG
- Type: Public company
- Industry: Automotive, Military
- Founded: 1903
- Defunct: 1982
- Fate: Merged with Franz Brozincevic & Cie into Nutzfahrzeuggesellschaft Arbon & Wetzikon (NAW)
- Successor: Saurer AG
- Headquarters: Arbon (TG), Switzerland
- Key people: Franz Saurer
- Products: Motor vehicles

Adolph Saurer AG was a Swiss manufacturer of embroidery and textile machines, trucks and buses under the Saurer and Berna (beginning in 1929) brand names. Based in Arbon, Switzerland, the firm was active between 1903 and 1982. Their vehicles were widely used across mainland Europe, particularly in the interwar period.

== History ==
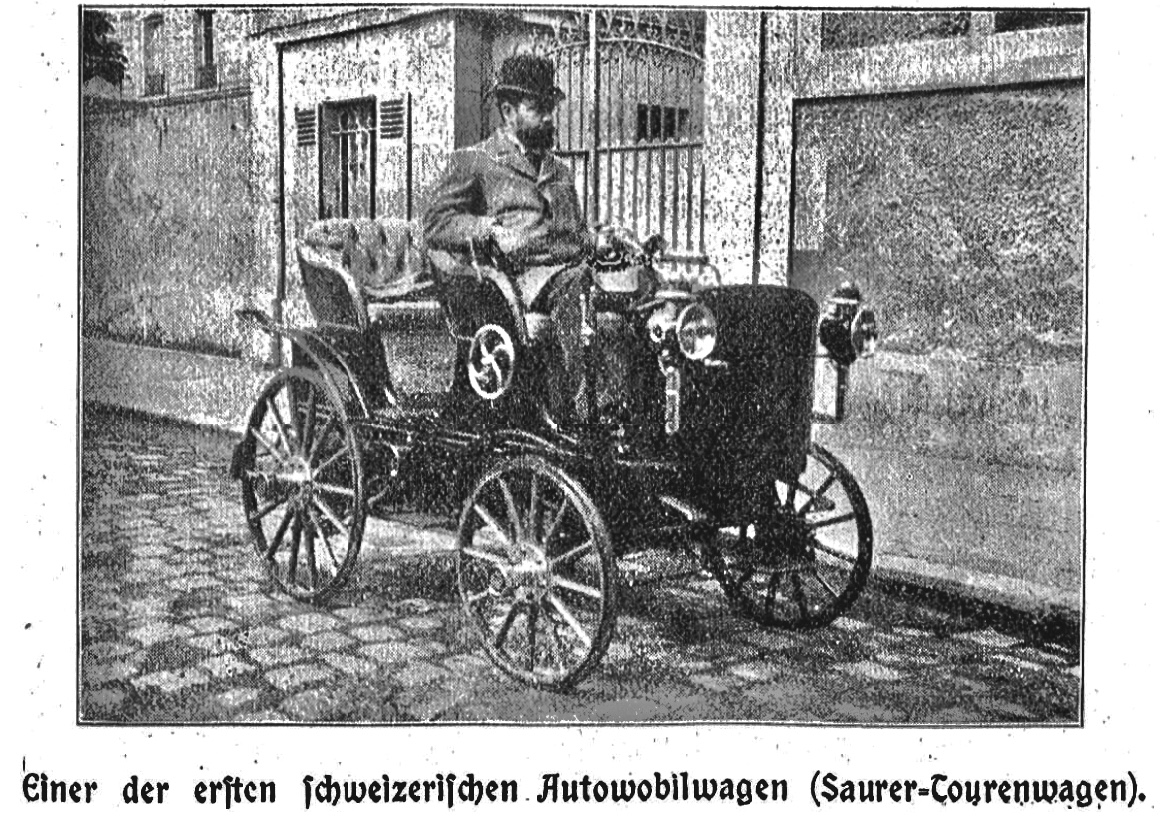
Saurer Touring (1897) still with a tiller, from 1898 with a steering wheel

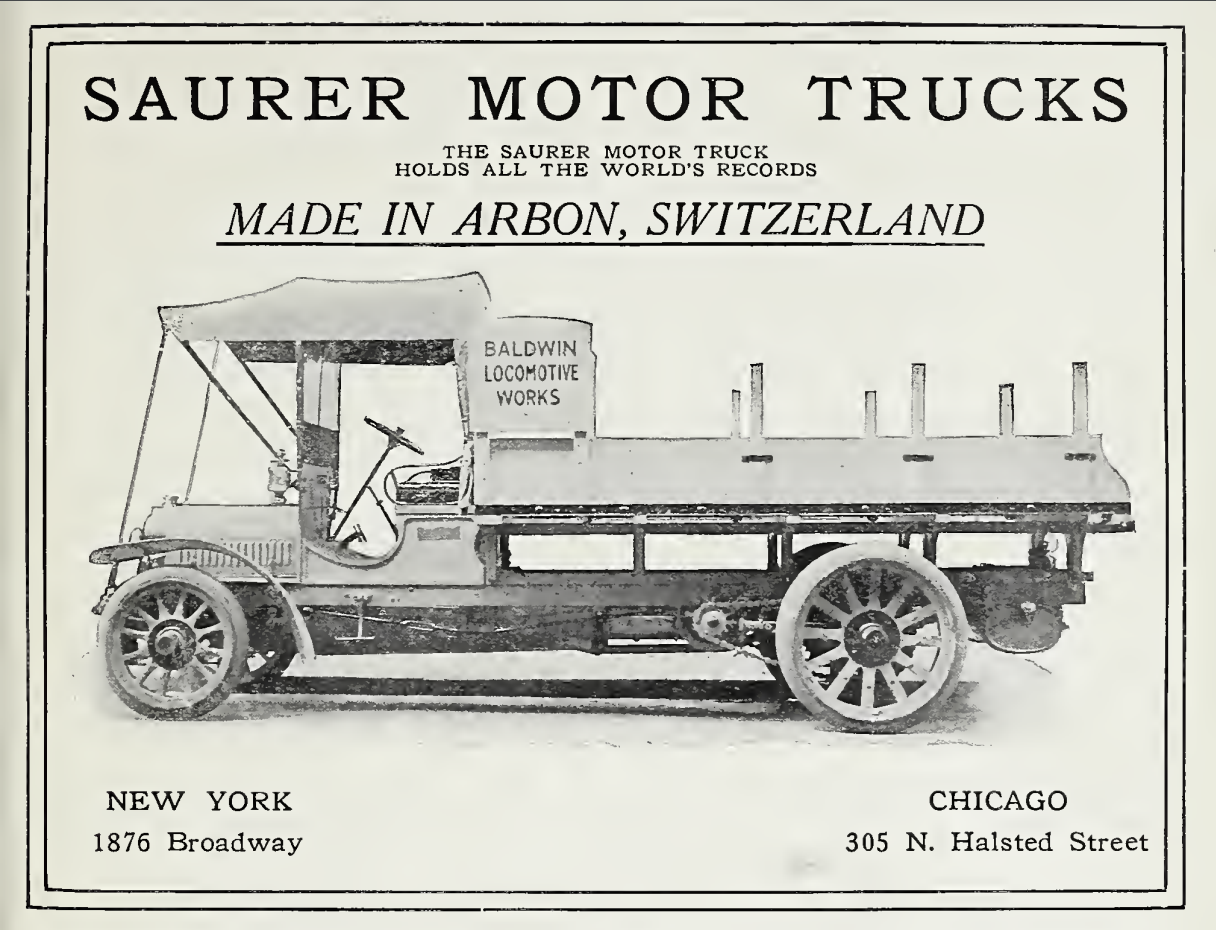
1910 Saurer Motor Trucks Ad

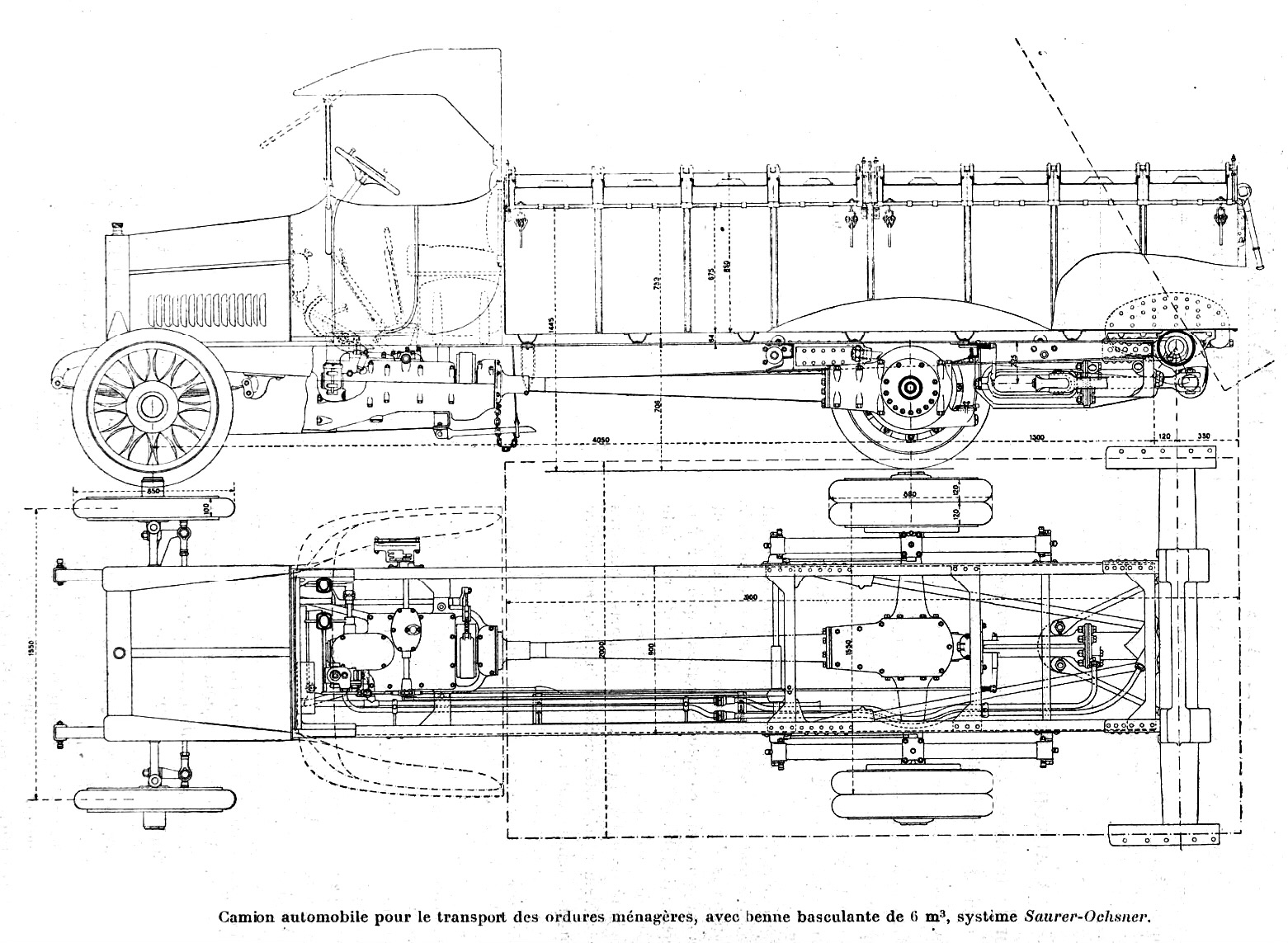
Saurer 30 hp Truck (1918)

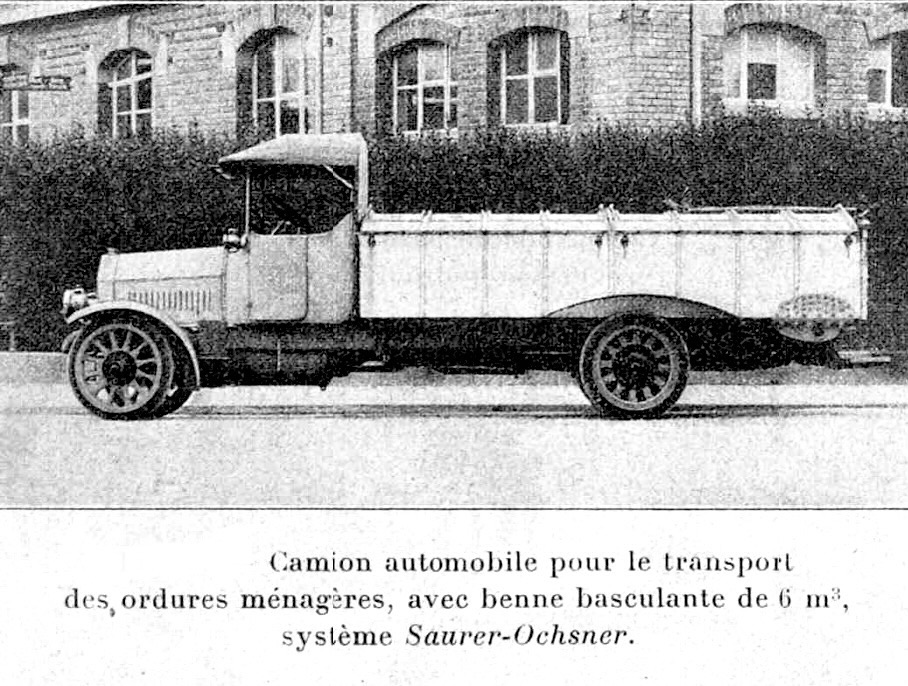
Truck made according to the drawing shown above with 30 hp (1918)

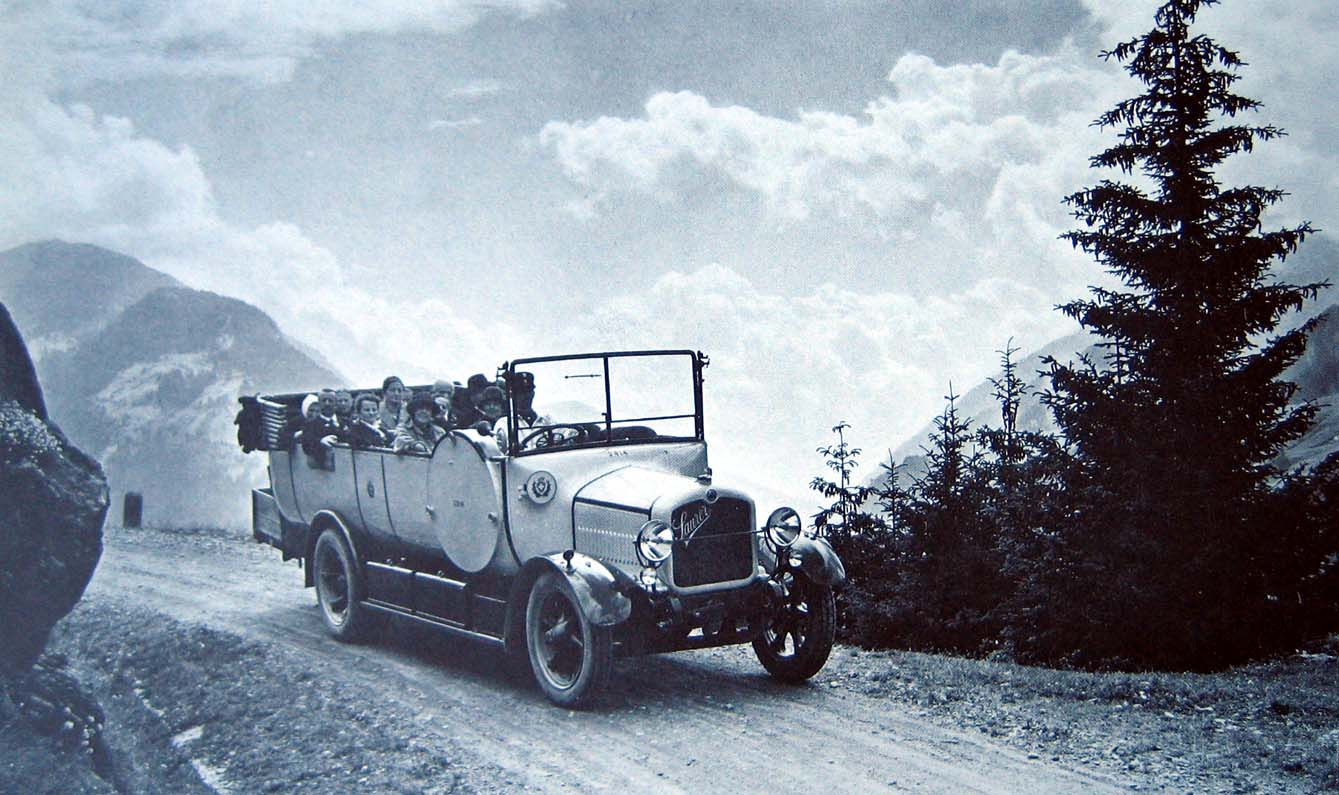
A Saurer Car-Alpin in 1930

In 1853, Franz Saurer (1806–1882) from Veringenstadt, Germany established an iron foundry for household goods near the Swiss town of Sankt Gallen. Eastern Switzerland was a center for both embroidery and embroidery machine development.

In approximately 1850, Franz Rittmeyer built the first practical satin stitch embroidery machine, known as the Handstickmaschine. Several Swiss companies began building and improving these machines, their heyday lasting from roughly 1865 until the end of the century. Two of Franz Saurer's sons – Anton and Adolph – were aware of this invention, saw an opportunity, and began building hand embroidery machines in their father's foundry around 1869. By 1873, F. Saurer & Söhne were the leader among the Swiss competitors in terms of sales and total machines built. By 1883, Saurer's production peaked at 796 machines per year; They had produced a total of 5,530 machines to date.

Saxony, Germany was also a centre for embroidery and machine development. By the 1890s, German companies were Saurer's strongest competition. By the late 1870s, a new, faster type of machine was invented: The bobbin shuttle, or schiffli machine, adapted the lock stitch from the sewing machine. A German company added a Jacquard punch card reader, and thus, fully automated the process. Competition motivated engineers at Saurer to develop their own Jacquard card reader, improve the stitch rate, and increase the machine's width (i.e. the total number of needles and throughput). In 1905, Saurer matched the competing machine's width at ten meters. In 1913, it increased the width to 15 meters.

The embroidery industry experienced many ups and downs due to fashion, trade, policies and world wars. Saurer diversified into petrol and diesel engines, and then trucks to reduce its exposure to this volatility. However, Saurer continued to innovate and is still a leader in schiffli embroidery machines.

In 1896, the eldest surviving son Adolph Saurer (1841–1920) took over the company. He and his son Hippolyt (1878–1936) developed the enterprise as a joint-stock company. Hippolyt Saurer initiated the production of a phaeton body automobile run by a one-cylinder opposed-piston engine. In 1902 a first four-cylinder T-head engine model with touring car and sedan chassis was built.

From 1903 onwards Saurer concentrated on the production of commercial vehicles which soon gained a good reputation. The company ran subsidiary companies in Austria (1906–1959, in the end taken over by Steyr-Daimler-Puch), France (1910–1956, taken over by Unic), the United Kingdom (1927–1931, taken over by Armstrong Whitworth as Armstrong-Saurer), and in Germany (1915–1918, taken over by MAN). In Italy, the Officine Meccaniche (OM) manufacturer was for many years licensee of Saurer engines and other mechanical units, which they used in their own ranges of trucks and buses. In Poland the state-owned Państwowe Zakłady Inżynieryjne produced license-built Saurer engines (powering, among others, the 7TP and 9TP tanks) and coach chassis used in the Zawrat bus.

In the United States, the Saurer Motor Truck Company, headed by C.P. Coleman, had the rights to manufacture and sell heavy trucks under the Saurer brand name at its plant in Plainfield, New Jersey (which commenced operations in November 1911). On September 23, 1911, the Saurer Motor Truck Company merged with the Mack Brothers Motor Car Company of Allentown, Pennsylvania, headed by J. M. Mack, to form the International Motor Truck Company (IMTC). IMTC would continue to make and sell trucks using the Saurer name until 1918. In 1922 IMTC would become Mack Trucks, Inc.

Saurer trucks were developed along the years into four basic ranges:

- A-type (1918)
- B-type (1926)
- C-type (1934)
- D-type (1959)

It was the B-type that established Saurer's international reputation as a builder of long-lasting trucks.

In 1929 Saurer acquired its Swiss rival, Motorwagenfabrik Berna AG of Olten, but the Berna name was allowed to continue, badging the very same Saurer models.

From 1932 on, trolleybuses were a very significant segment of Saurer production. Typically Saurer, or Berna, trolleybuses featured Brown, Boveri & Cie or Société Anonyme des Ateliers de Sécheron (SAAS) electric equipment and Carrosserie Hess bodies. Saurer trolleybuses operated in most of Central Europe countries, and still do in several of them.

In World War 2, a restructured type BT 4500 and 5 BHw of Saurer trucks were used to gas people in the Nazi Chełmno extermination camp. Extermination vans were adapted, when they went in for repair, to carry the optimum number of people who could be gassed in the time it took to drive them from Chelmno to the woods where they were disposed of in ovens. There was concern about the strain on the front axle if too many people were loaded to be gassed, but as piles of bodies were always closest to the doors there was no strain on the front axle.

In 1951 Saurer and its Italian licensee, OM, reached an agreement by which Saurer would market in Switzerland OM's light and medium-weight trucks and buses, using Saurer-OM and Berna-OM badges. This was successful and lasted until Saurer closure.

== Aero engines ==
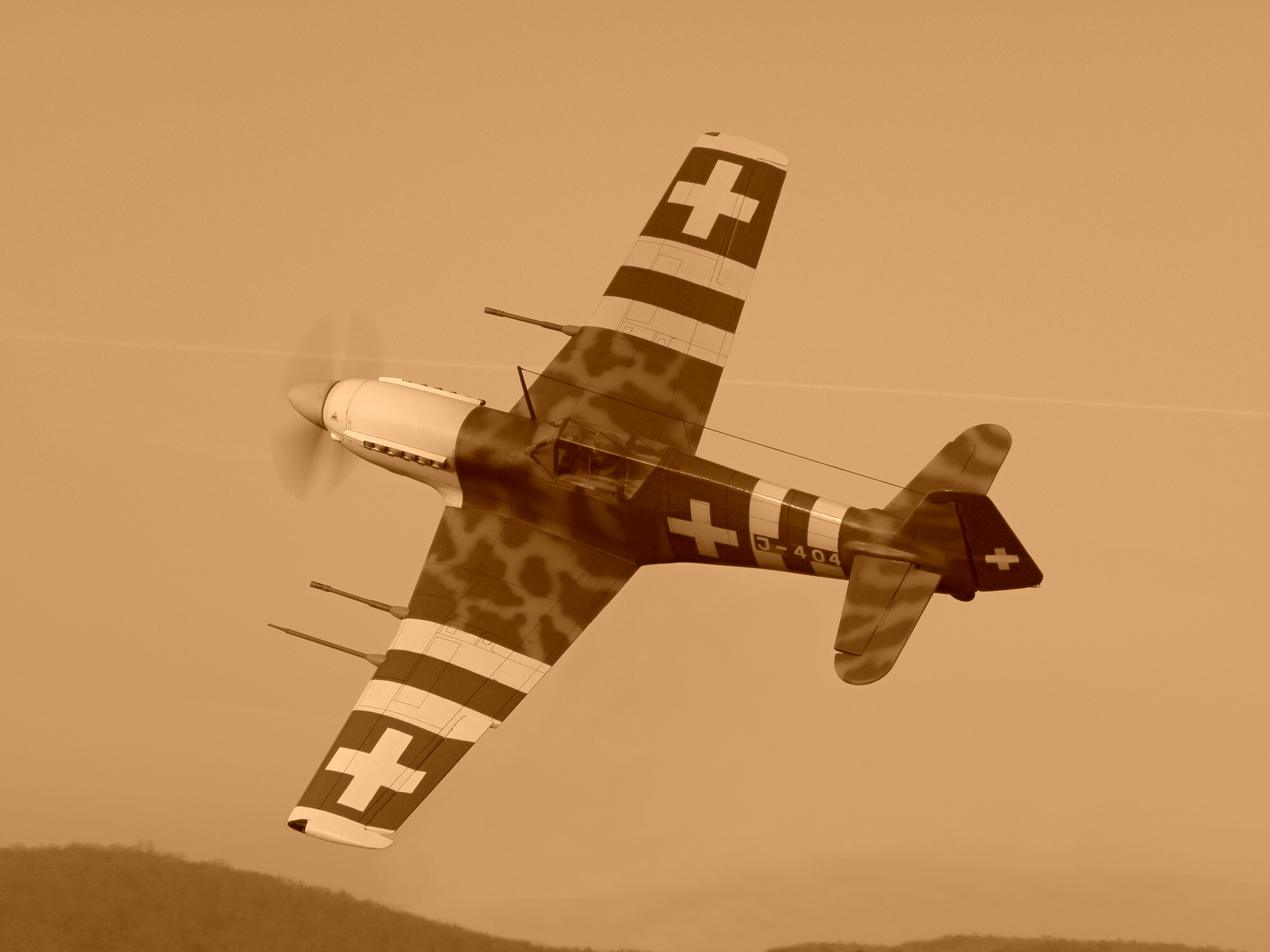
A Doflug D-3802A powered by a Saurer YS-2 aero-engine.

Saurer began licensed manufacture of aero engines in 1917. They also began developing their own designs, and built two prototypes of a V12 design in 1918.

The FLB series, developed from the 1930s to the 1940s, were based on the principles of the Junkers Jumo 205. Like the Jumo they were two-stroke diesels with two crank shafts and two pistons per combustion chamber. However the cylinders were bent into a V shape, allowing them to be doubled up on each crank shaft to create a compact diamond arrangement. The design was also able to run on petrol, still with fuel injection, and a small test engine was run in both modes. The FLB 1000 had three banks giving a design output of 1,000 hp and was briefly bench-tested using petrol. However, the project was dropped before it could be run on diesel.

The FLB project was dropped to make room for an urgent requirement to develop the Hispano-Suiza 12Y-51 V-12, a conventional four-stroke petrol engine, which was no longer available. Saurer developed it as the YS-2, which entered limited production. It was fitted to the EKW C-3604 and Doflug D-3802. The further developed YS-3 flew in the prototype Doflug D-3803.

== NAW ==
Declining sales in the early 1980s saw the two leading Swiss truck makers, Saurer and FBW (Franz Brozincevic & Cie of Wetzikon, Switzerland), merged in 1982 to form the company Nutzfahrzeuggesellschaft Arbon & Wetzikon (NAW), proceeding with motorbus and trolleybus production under the NAW brand, while the last Saurer-badged truck sold in the open market was delivered in 1983. Four years later, in 1987, a model 10DM supplied to the Swiss Army meant the very last Saurer truck produced in history.

In 1982, Daimler-Benz had acquired a major shareholding in the newly formed NAW, and soon took full control. In a short time, the Saurer, Berna, and FBW brands were dropped, while the NAW factory was used to assemble heavy haulage versions of Mercedes-Benz trucks. NAW went into liquidation in early 2003.

The last remainder of the Saurer automotive activity in Arbon is the present FPT Industrial S.p.A. engine research centre, that up to 1990 had been the Saurer Motorenforschung Research & Development Centre.

== The textile and automotive spin-offs ==
In 1995, Ernst Thomke took over the leadership of Saurer AG in Arbon as chairman of the board. To restructure the conglomerate, he had previously abandoned his position with its then major shareholder: BB Industrie Holding AG (22%). The previous major shareholder, Tito Tettamanti, specialized the company in textile machinery and "propulsion technology" and had acquired the main competitors Schlafhorst and Ghidela.

Thomke actively led Saurer until 1996, when he retired to the direction of the Board until 1999. He promulgated transparency at all levels, flexible working hours, optimized the production and refined accounting systems. In 1996, the Saurer group became profitable again, with more than half of the revenue originating from Schlafhorst after its restructuring.

== Oerlikon Textile ==
Since 2007, the conglomerate Saurer AG, which meanwhile had reached a worldwide leading status in textile machinery, has been integrated into the Oerlikon Corporation.

Oerlikon-Saurer Textile is a manufacturer of systems for spinning, texturizing, twisting and embroidery.

=== Oerlikon-Saurer "Graziano Trasmissioni" ===
Since 2007 the remaining part of Saurer AG automotive, Graziano Trasmissioni, a manufacturer of gears, gear groups and complete transmission systems for agricultural, earth moving and special vehicles, as well as for four wheel drive passenger cars, and luxury sport cars, has been integrated into the Oerlikon Corporation.

== Models ==
=== Buses ===
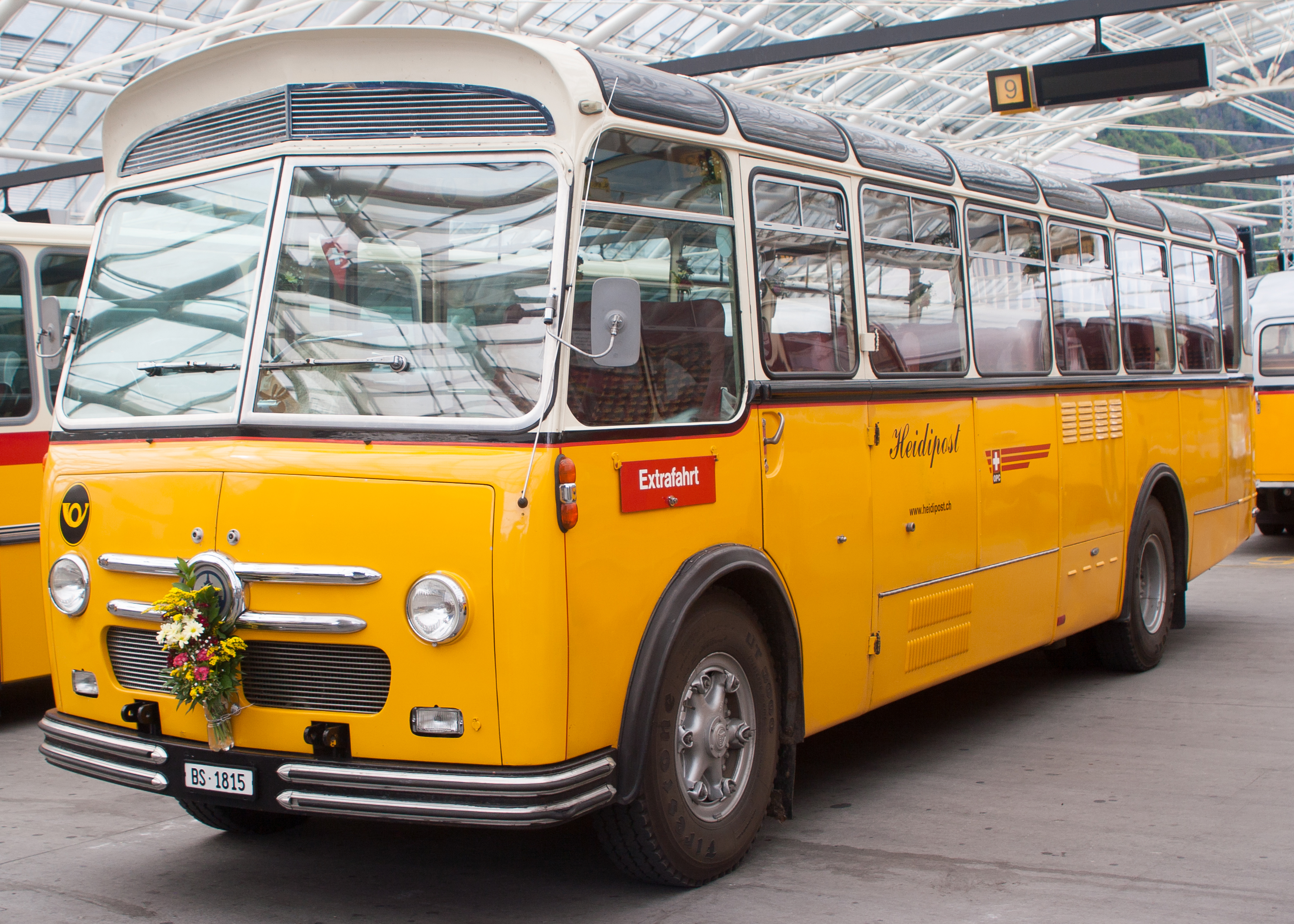
Saurer 3-DUK Alpenwagen IV-U (1964)

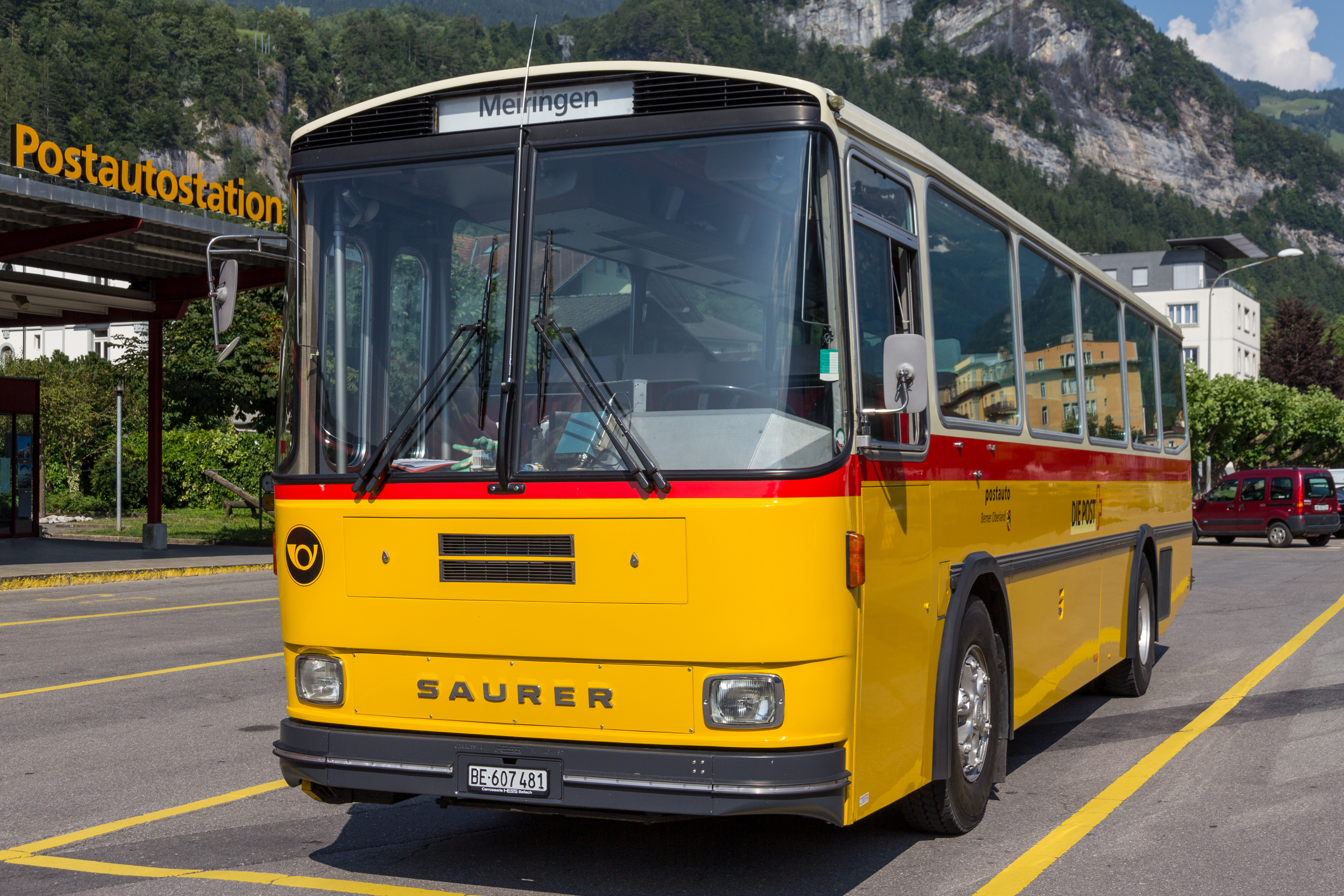
Saurer RH525

- Saurer 2A
- Type B:
  - 2BHP, 3BHP, 3BHPL (1925)
  - Saurer AD
- Type C:
  - Saurer Hess 1C (1935)
  - Saurer Hess 2C
  - Saurer 3C-H (1937)
  - Saurer 4H
  - Saurer 6H (1946)
  - Saurer 4ZP (1946)
  - Saurer S4C (1948)
  - Saurer 3CT-1DA (1949)
  - Saurer 2H Reisewagen (1952)
  - Saurer N2C Alpenwagen II (1954)
  - Saurer L4C Alpenwagen IIIa (1953)
- Type D:
  - Saurer 3DUR
  - Saurer 3DUX Alpenwagen (1955)
  - Saurer 5DUP
  - Saurer 3DUK-50 (1968-1973)
  - Saurer 5 DUK
- Saurer RH (1978)
- Saurer RH 525-23 Postkurswagen Type IV (1978)
- Saurer RH 580-25 (1980)
- Saurer 5K (1981)
- Saurer SLK

=== Trolleybus ===
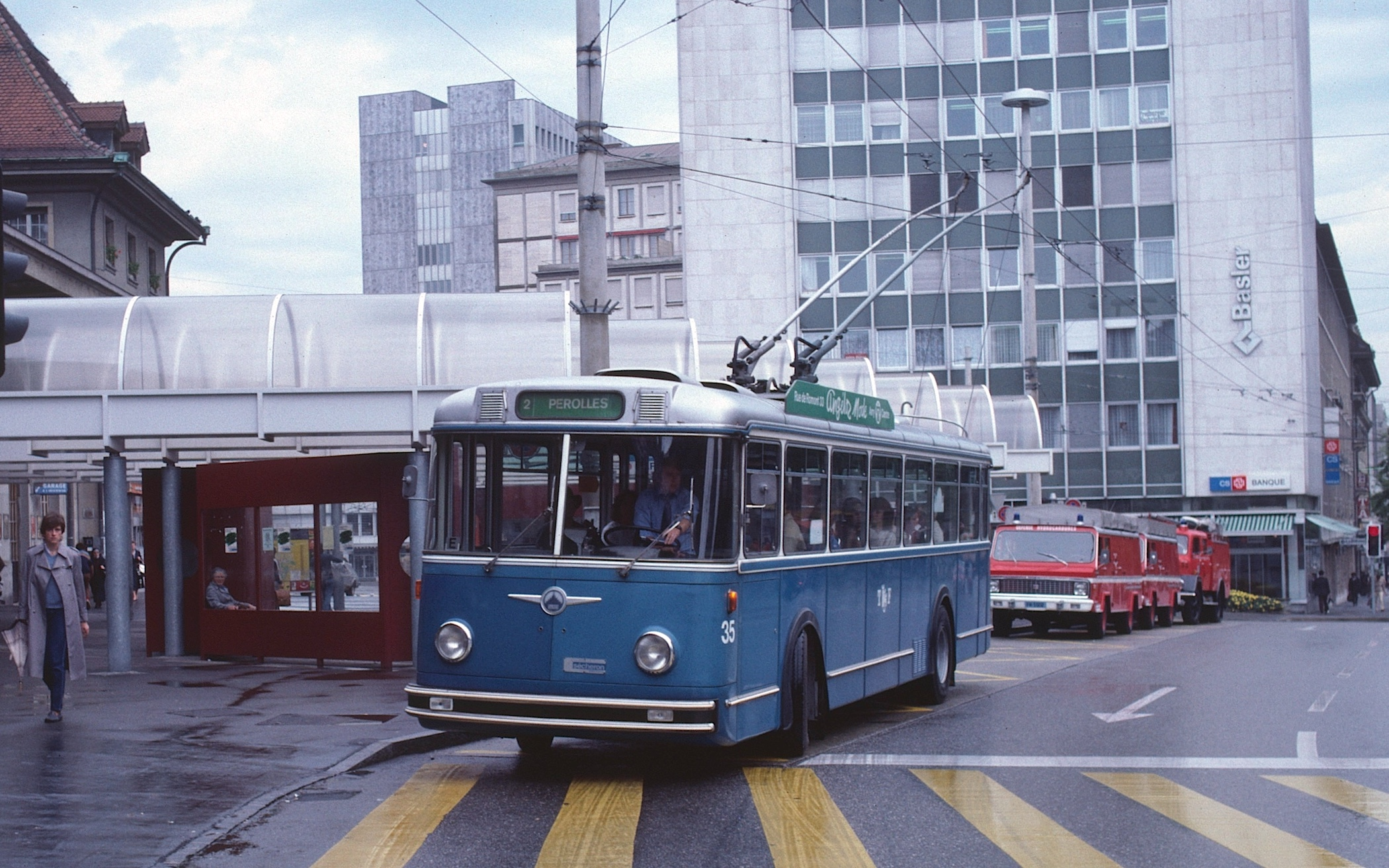
A Hess-bodied Saurer trolleybus in Fribourg in 1983

- Saurer 411LM
- Saurer 415
- Saurer GT 560
  - GT 560 640-25

=== Military Vehicles ===
- Saurer 4K 4FA
- Saurer MH4
- Saurer M6
- Nahkampfkanone 1
- Nahkampfkanone 2
- Saurer 2DM
- Saurer 10DM
- Saurer Tartaruga

=== Saurer F006 ===
Monteverdi civilian prototype; Saurer manufactured 12 pre-series military versions

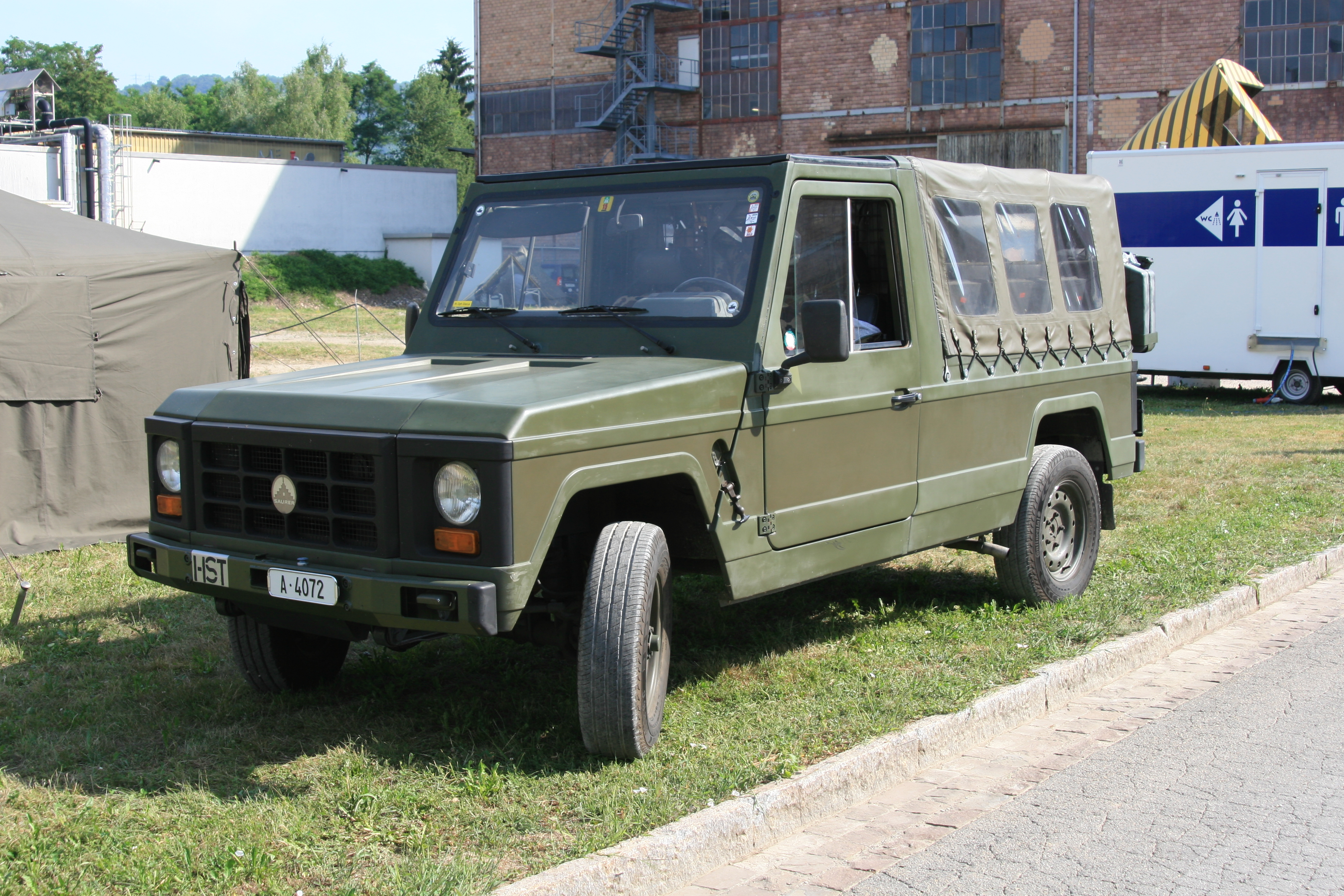
Saurer F006

The Saurer F006 (also known as Saurer 288) and F007 were, apart from the Swiss Army cross-country trucks known as the (6-ton) Saurer 6DM and the (10-ton) Saurer 10DM, the last vehicle designs of the company. In the late 1970s, the F006 design was intended as a successor to the Jeep for the Swiss Army. It was hoped that the vehicle would be purchased by fire departments as well and used as work vehicles by public services, such as road maintenance operations, forest rangers, electric and water utilities, etc. Luxury car manufacturer Monteverdi put a civilian version of the Saurer F006 military vehicle, which they called the 260Z, on display at the Geneva Motor Show 1979. The 260Z was not produced in series, though three prototypes were made, which were shown at the Monteverdi Museum in Binningen. While Monteverdi did not use the Saurer chassis, they did produce two versions of a luxury SUV called the Safari/Sahara, based on the International Scout vehicle.

Another civilian version, called the Monteverdi 250 - Z, was derived from the Saurer F006 by Monteverdi, with engineering input from Berna. Saurer took over the production. The axles were reused from the International Scout. The vehicle had a plastic body made of polyester. For power, the drive-train was a 6-cylinder petrol engine from Volvo with an automatic transmission. Maximum speed was 100 km/h. Overall styling contrasted with the Mercedes G and Puch 230GE joint venture vehicle, with the front turn signals mounted conventionally on the front of the vehicle. The equipment installed in the front bumper parking lights can be turned by flicking the Tarnlicht switch, a multipurpose military switch for light dimming. The basic vehicle has a fixed open back cab. The passenger seats are closed with a fast removable plastic sheet at the rear, including a military holder for a gas canister; a fixed structure is provided for use in case of fire.

The F006 was first shown in 1980 and tested by the War Technical Department of the Swiss Army in 1982. They instead procured the Puch 230GE. Failure to secure the army production order meant that production of the vehicle for other potential customers was not economically viable, and in the end only 24 prototypes were built. One remained in service until 1988 and was subsequently donated to the Saurer Oldtimer Club. The other remaining vehicles are privately owned.

Simultaneously with the Saurer F006, the Saurer F007 was introduced in 1980 as a Pinzgauer High-Mobility All-Terrain Vehicle with similar versions available to the public. The F007 uses the same chassis and the same drive unit as the F006, but utilizing a cab-over design, with the engine compartment located internally. Unlike the F006, the F007 has three windshield wiper blades instead of two, four headlights instead of two, and the front parking lights and turn signals are housed in the same headlamp shell. The gasoline tank filler neck is on the left side immediately behind the driver's door, and not, as in the F006, on the right side between the rear and the rear wheel. The vehicle has a fixed cab which is open to the rear. The cargo area is covered with a plastic sheet, including two plastic windows on each side. This was based on the concept of the cab-over model 260 F by Monteverdi. For Swiss Army procurement, SUVs in addition to dedicated military vehicles were prepared for testing starting from 1982. The Swiss Army examined the high-road tested prototypes of the F007, but did not buy the vehicle. The existing Saurer F007's are now privately owned.

== Gallery of Saurer, Berna and NAW vehicles ==
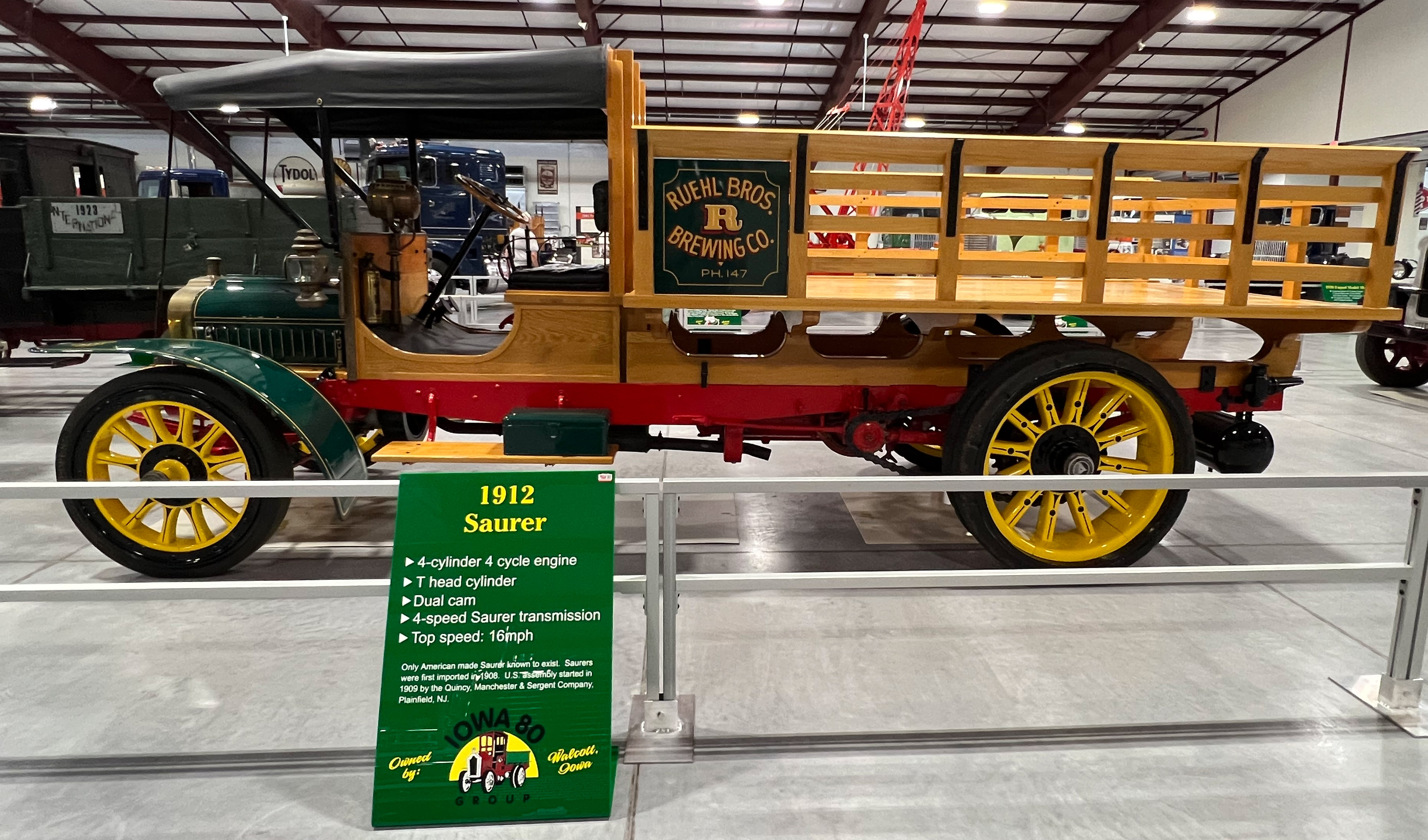
1912 Saurer truck on display at the Iowa 80 Trucking Museum, Walcott, Iowa.

A Saurer coach in Northern Spain in 1923

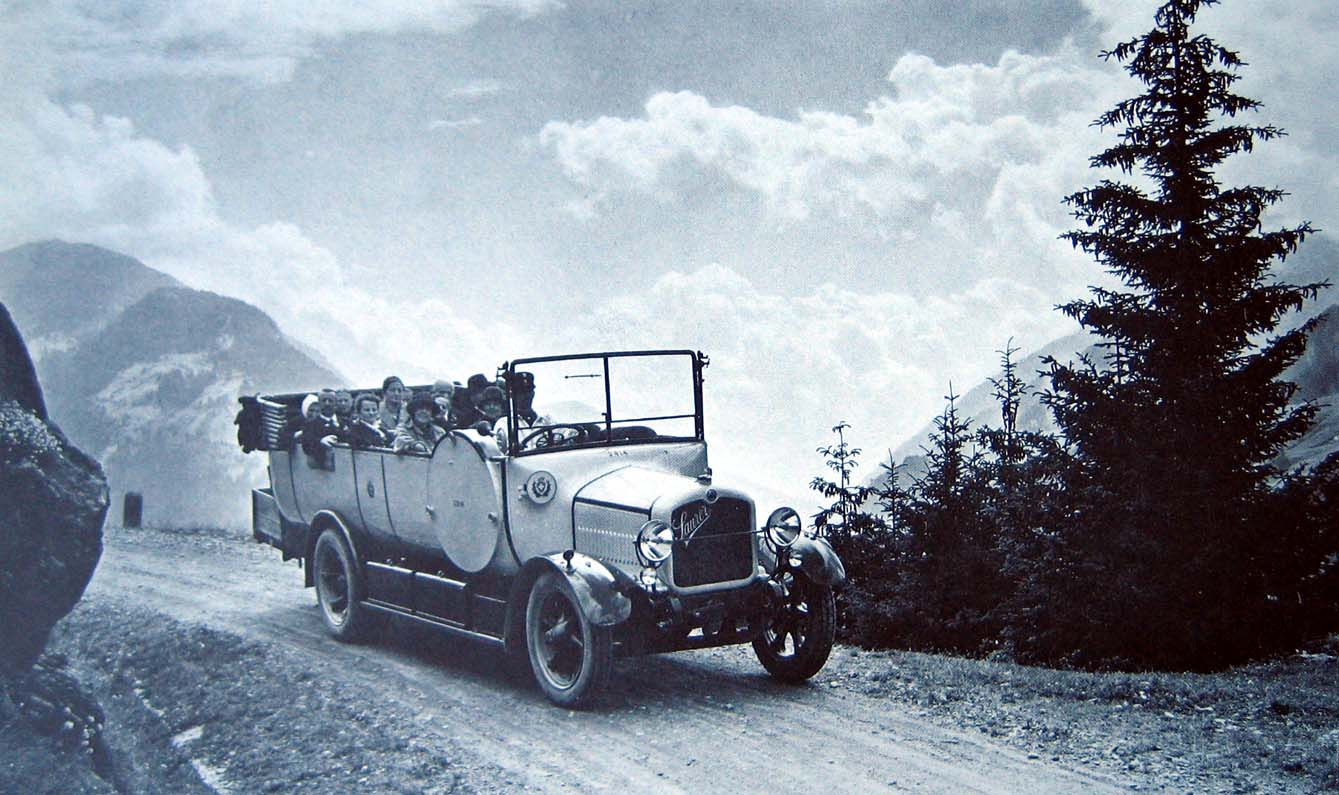
Postauto Saurer AD 1930

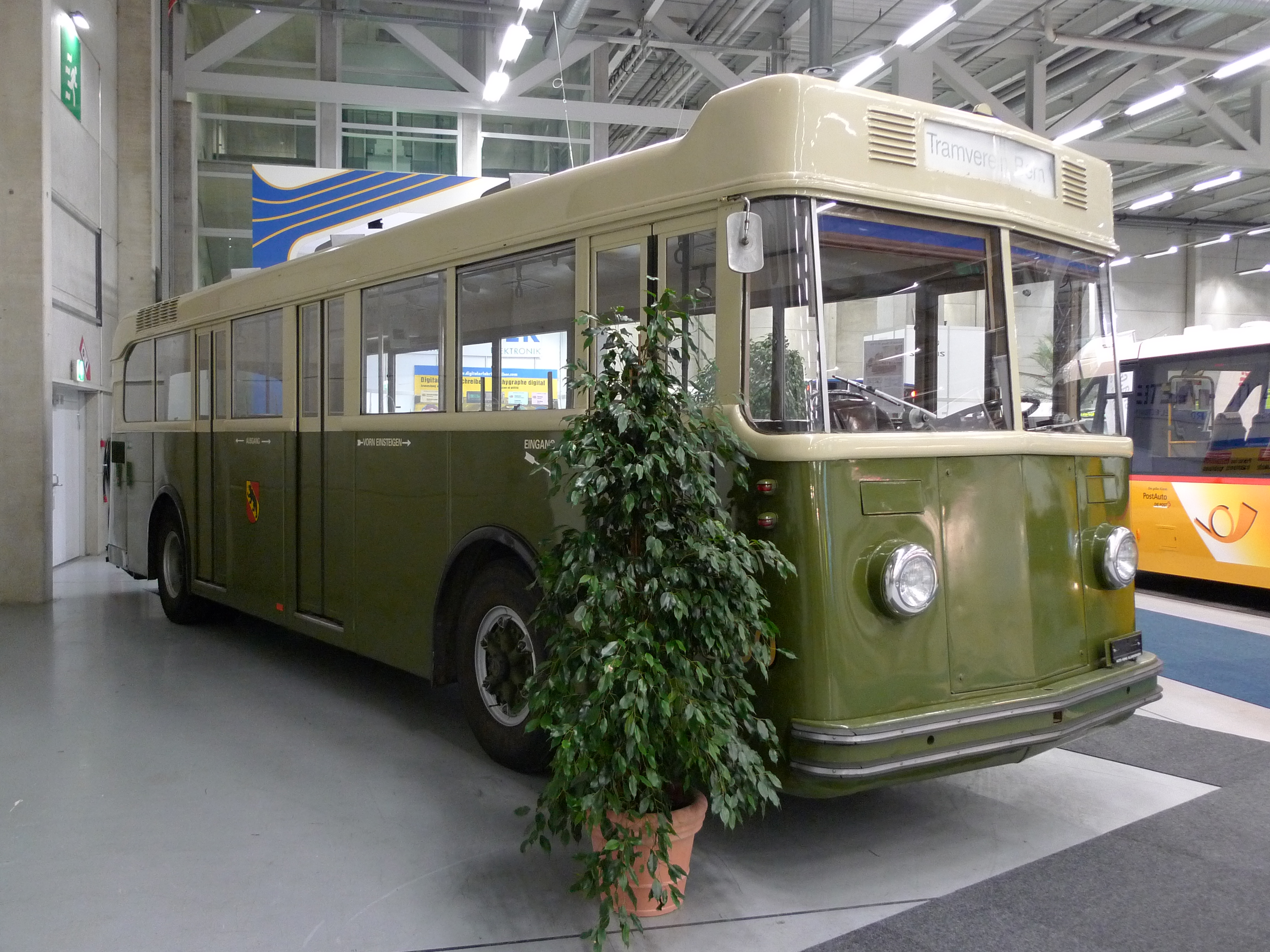
Saurer 4H 1941

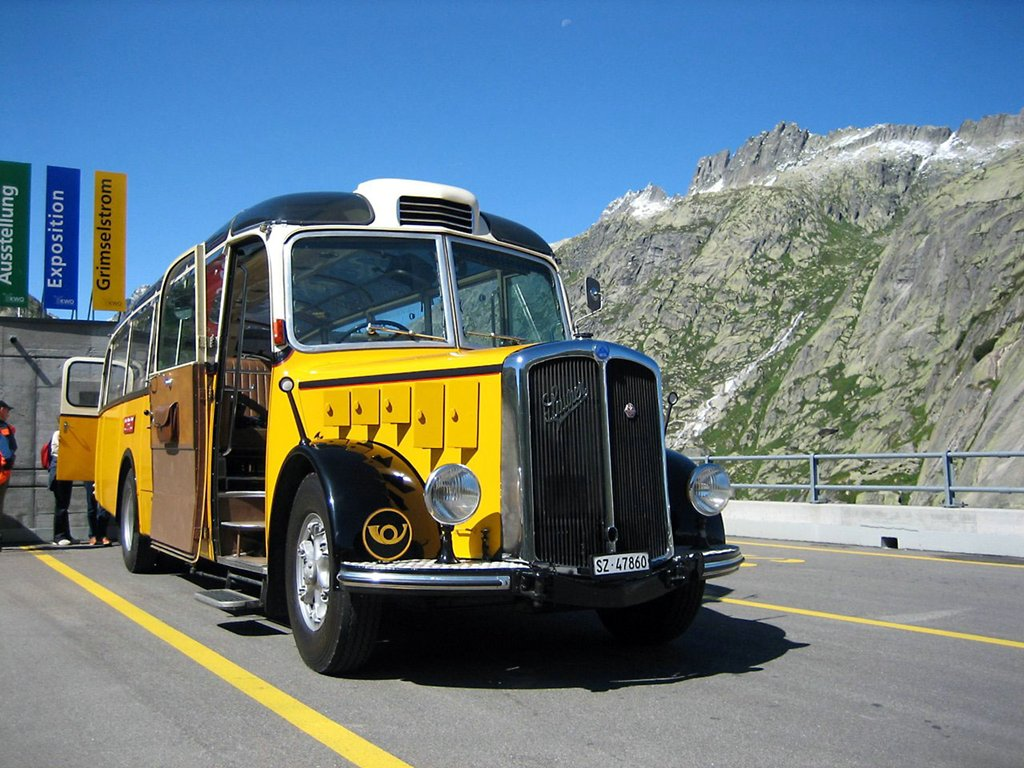
Saurer L4C Typ IIIaPostBus, c.1950

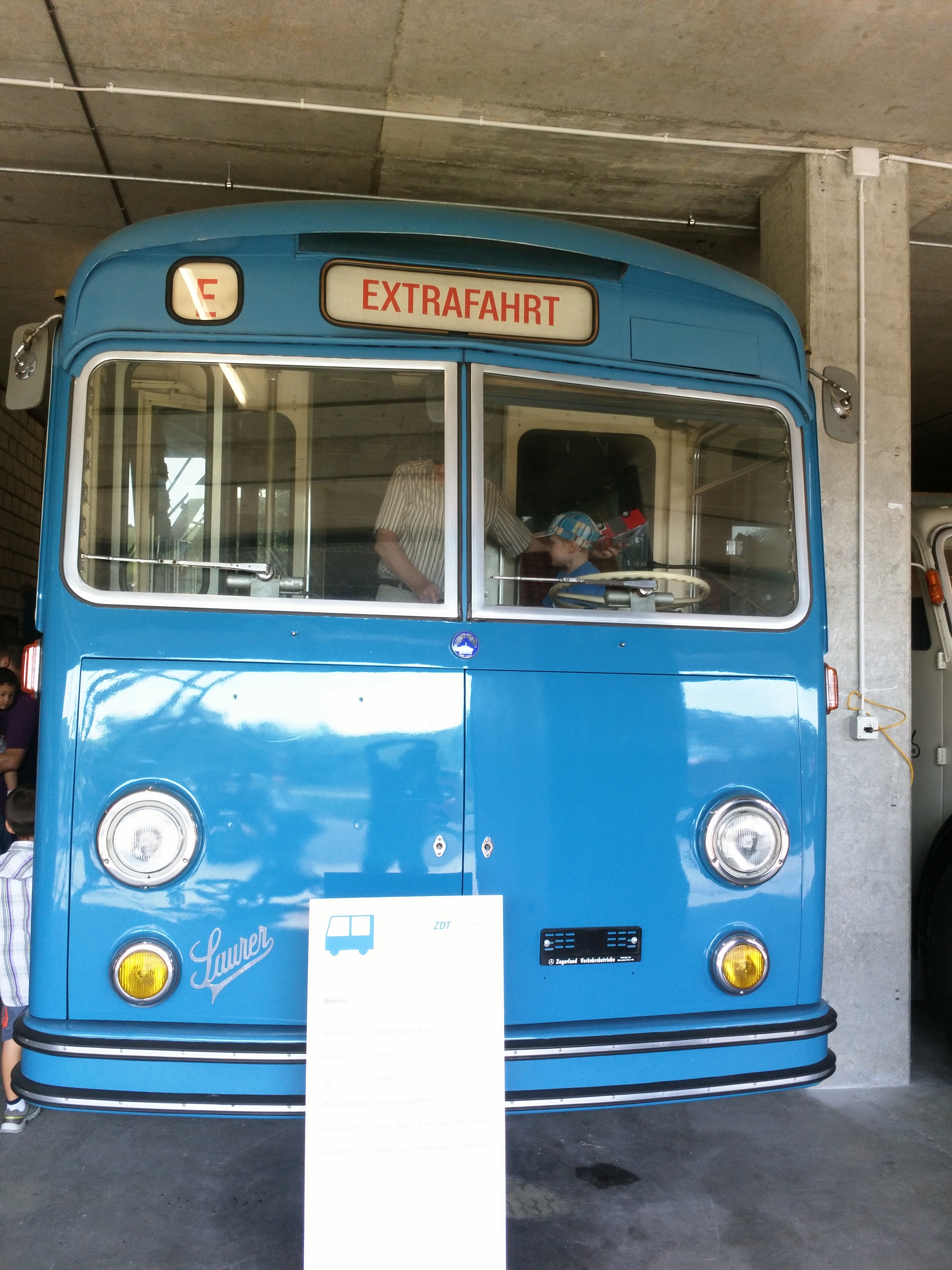
Saurer 5 DUK

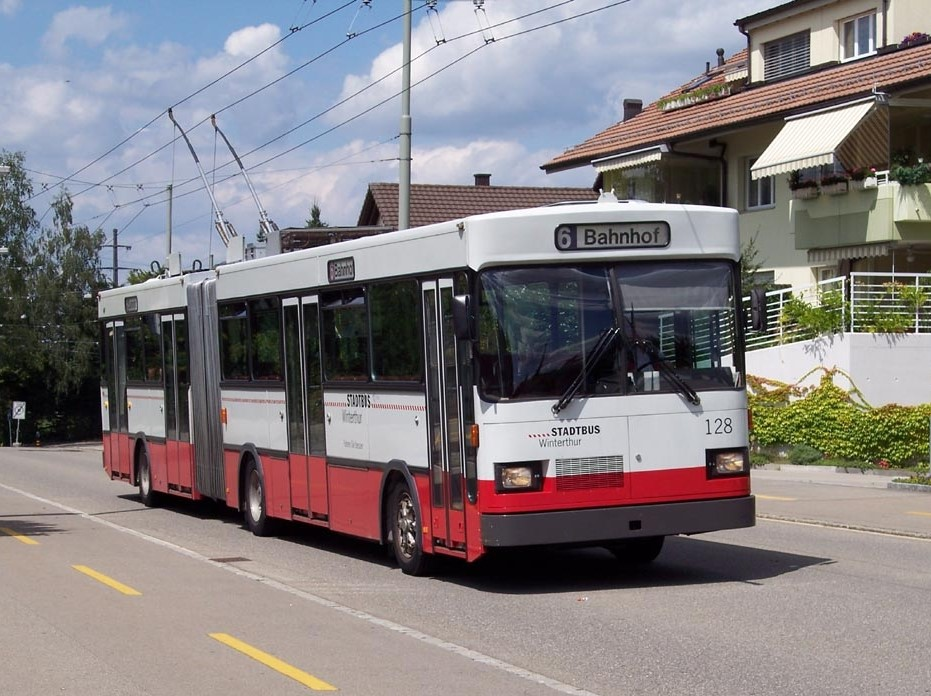
GT 560/640-25 Winterthur 2005

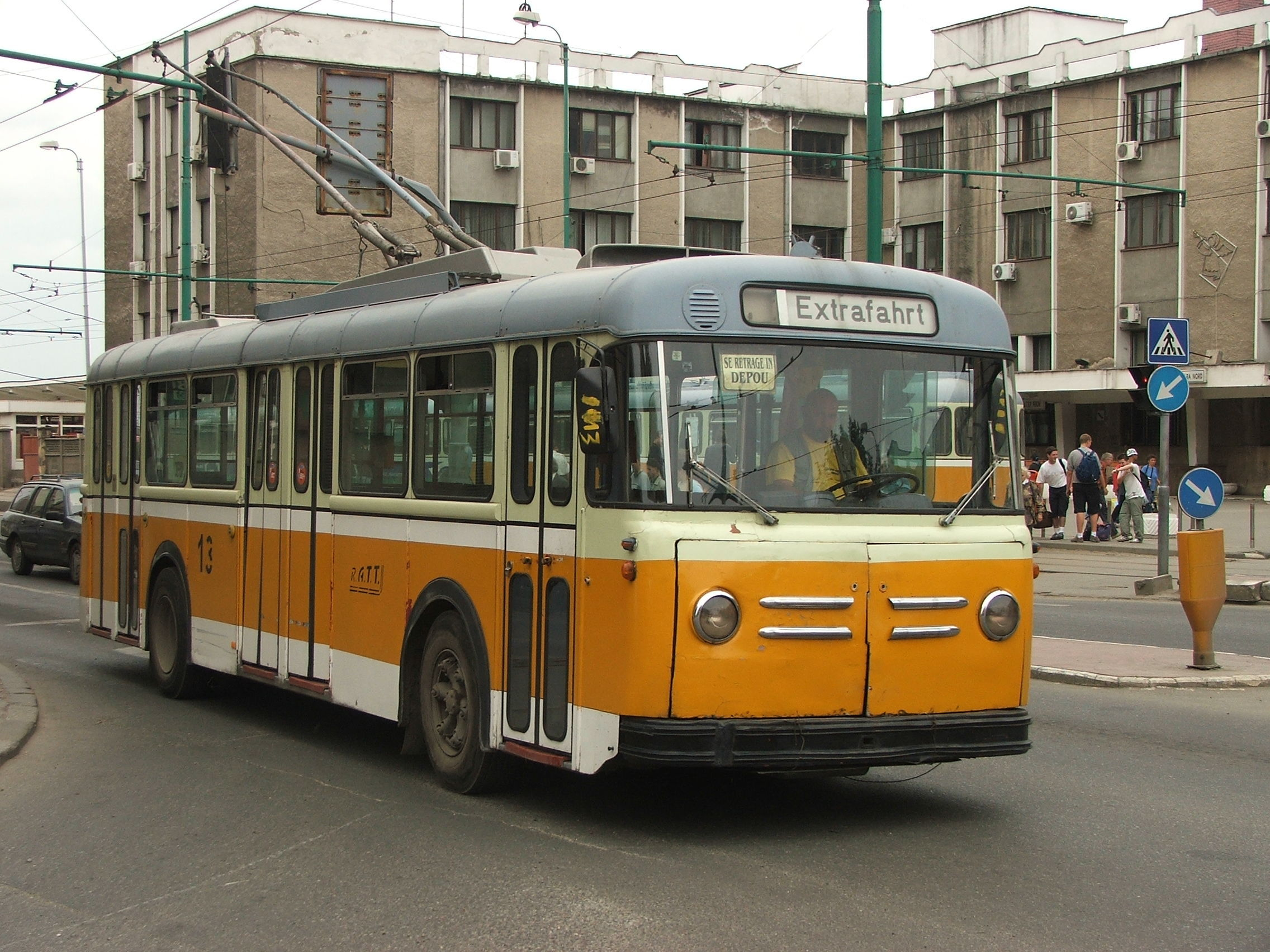
Saurer 415 trolleybus in Timișoara, 2005

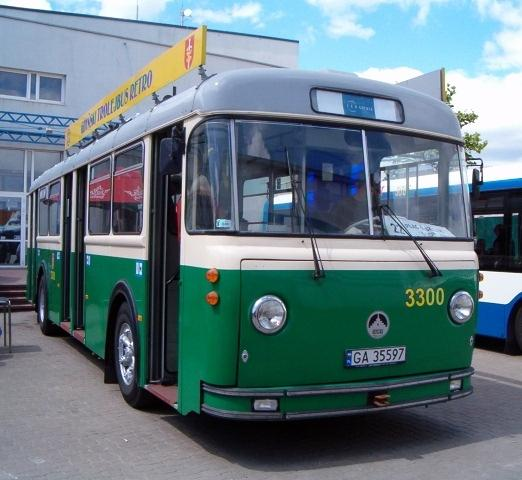
Saurer 4TIILM trolleybus in Gdynia, 2006

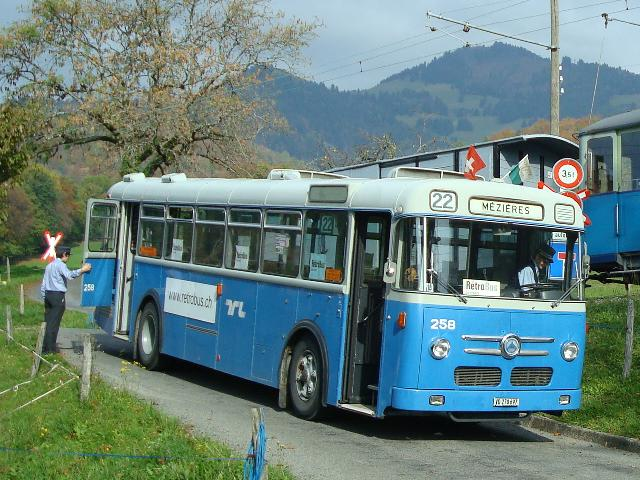
Saurer Tramway Lausanne (TL)

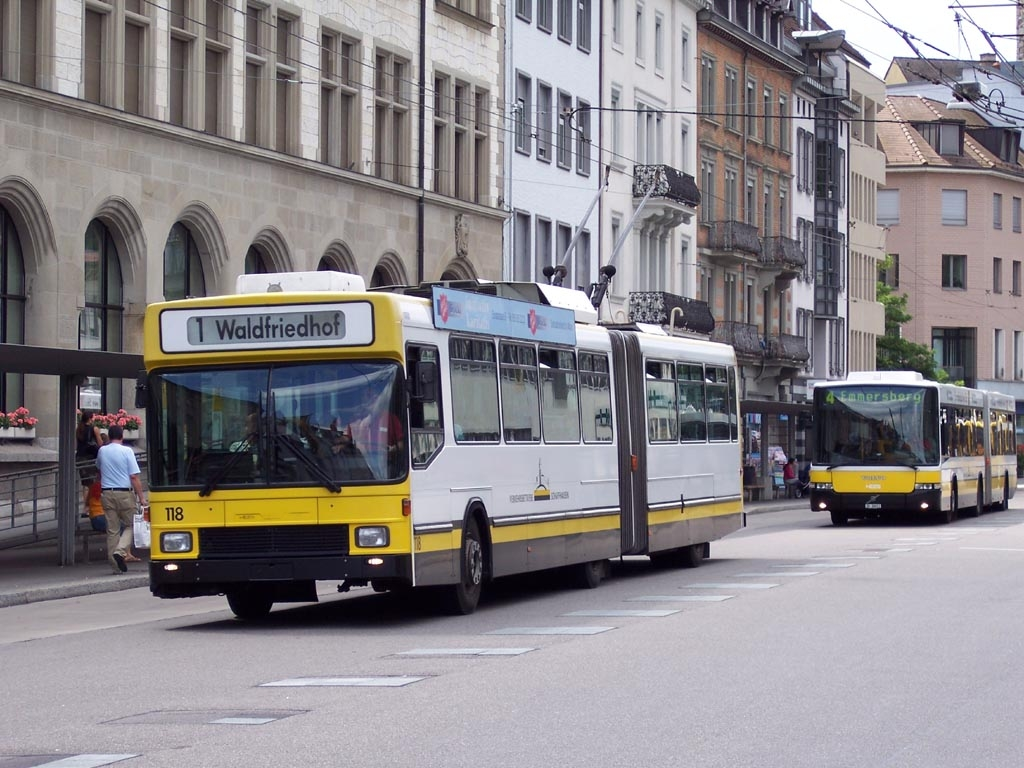
Carrosserie Hess bodied NAW trolleybus in Schaffhausen

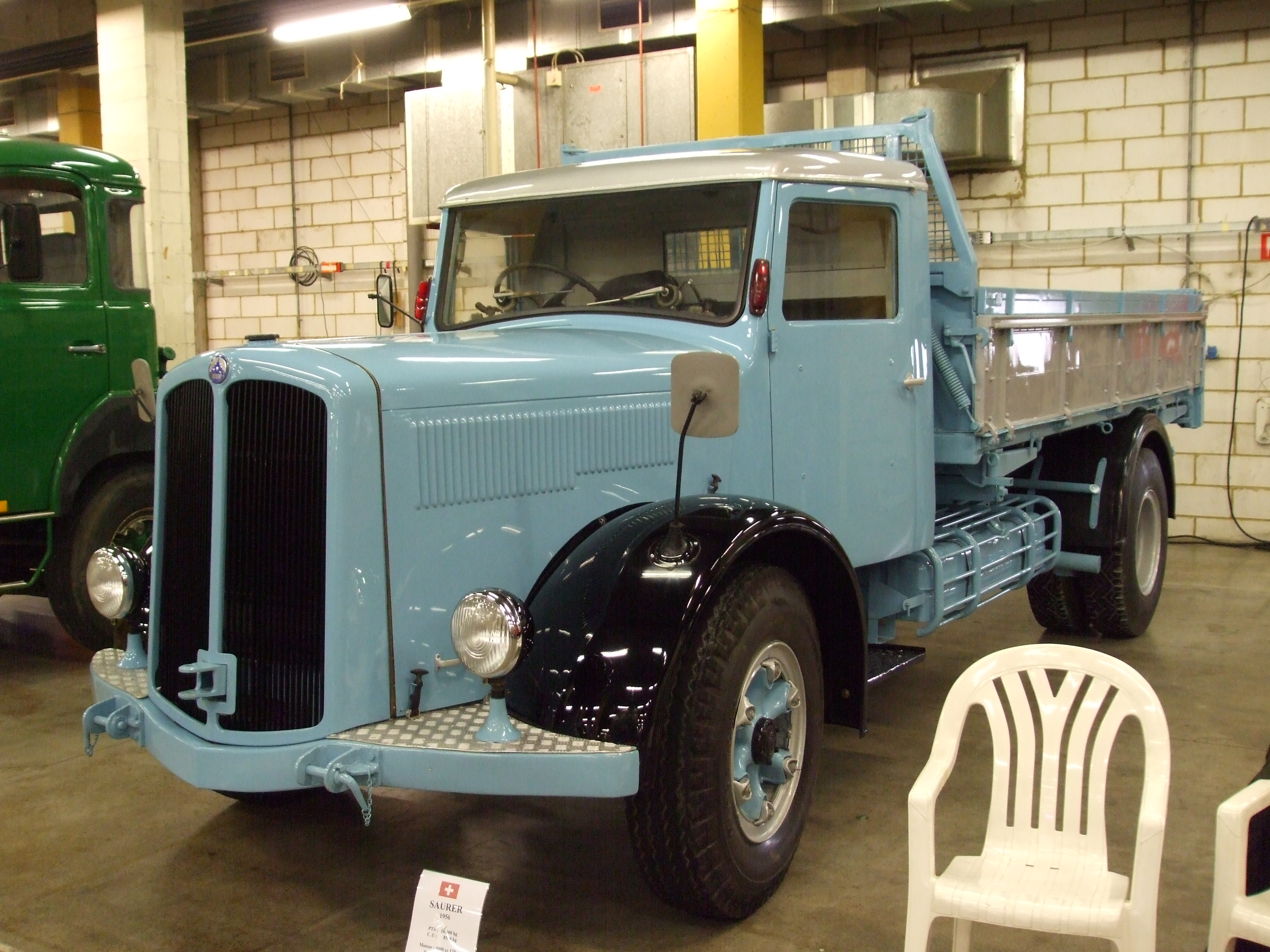
Saurer 1956

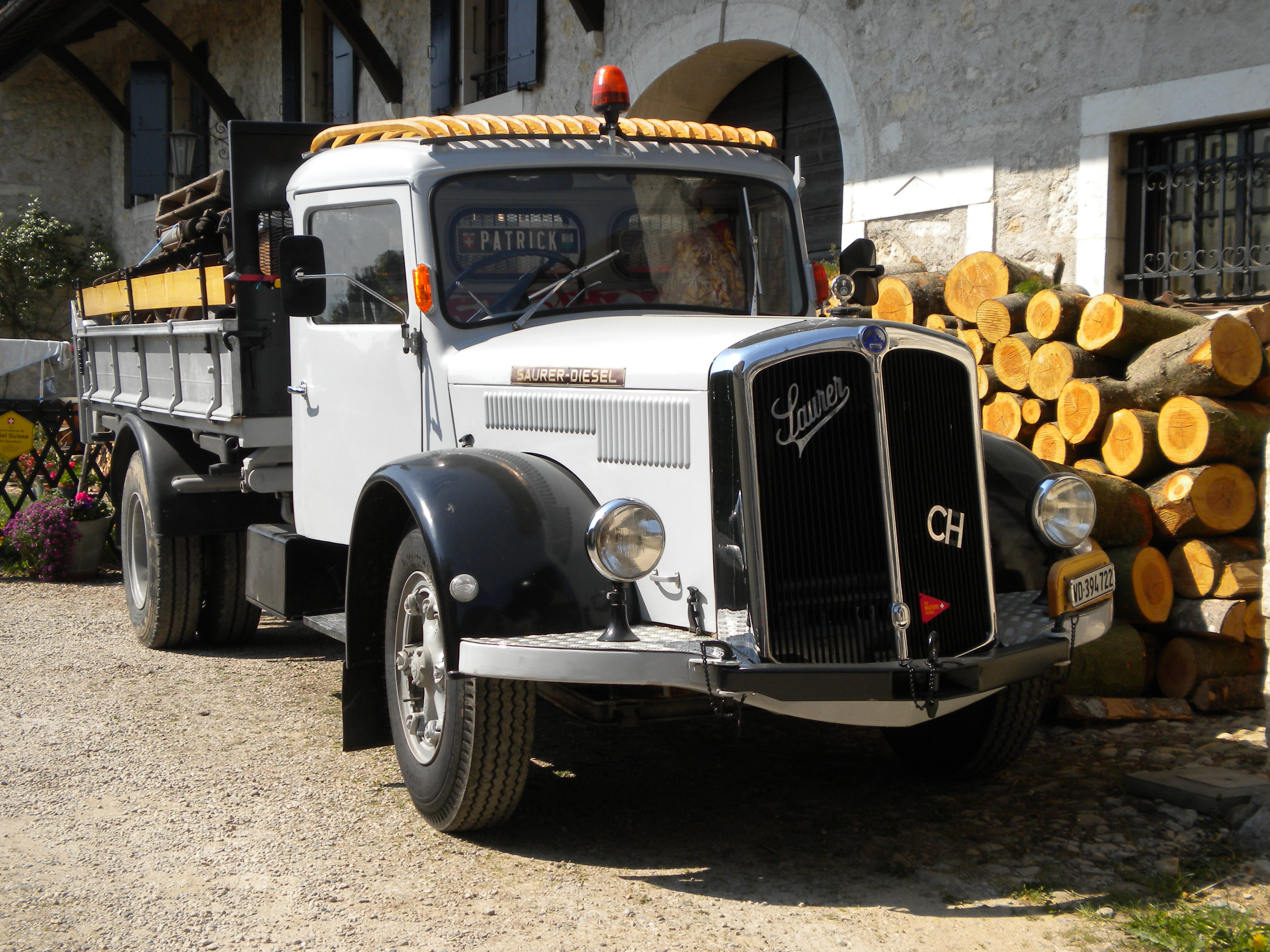
Saurer, 1962

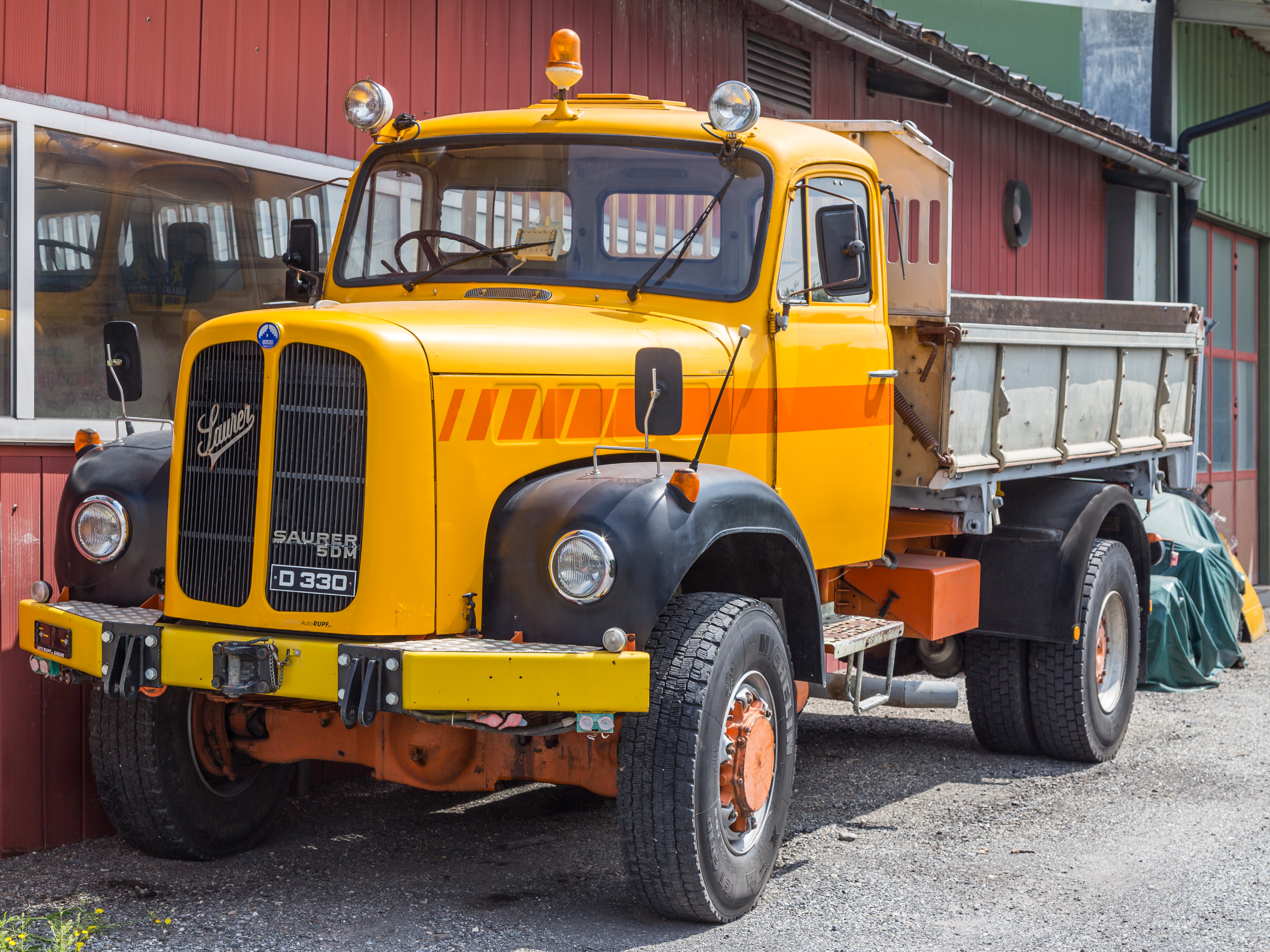
Saurer 5DM

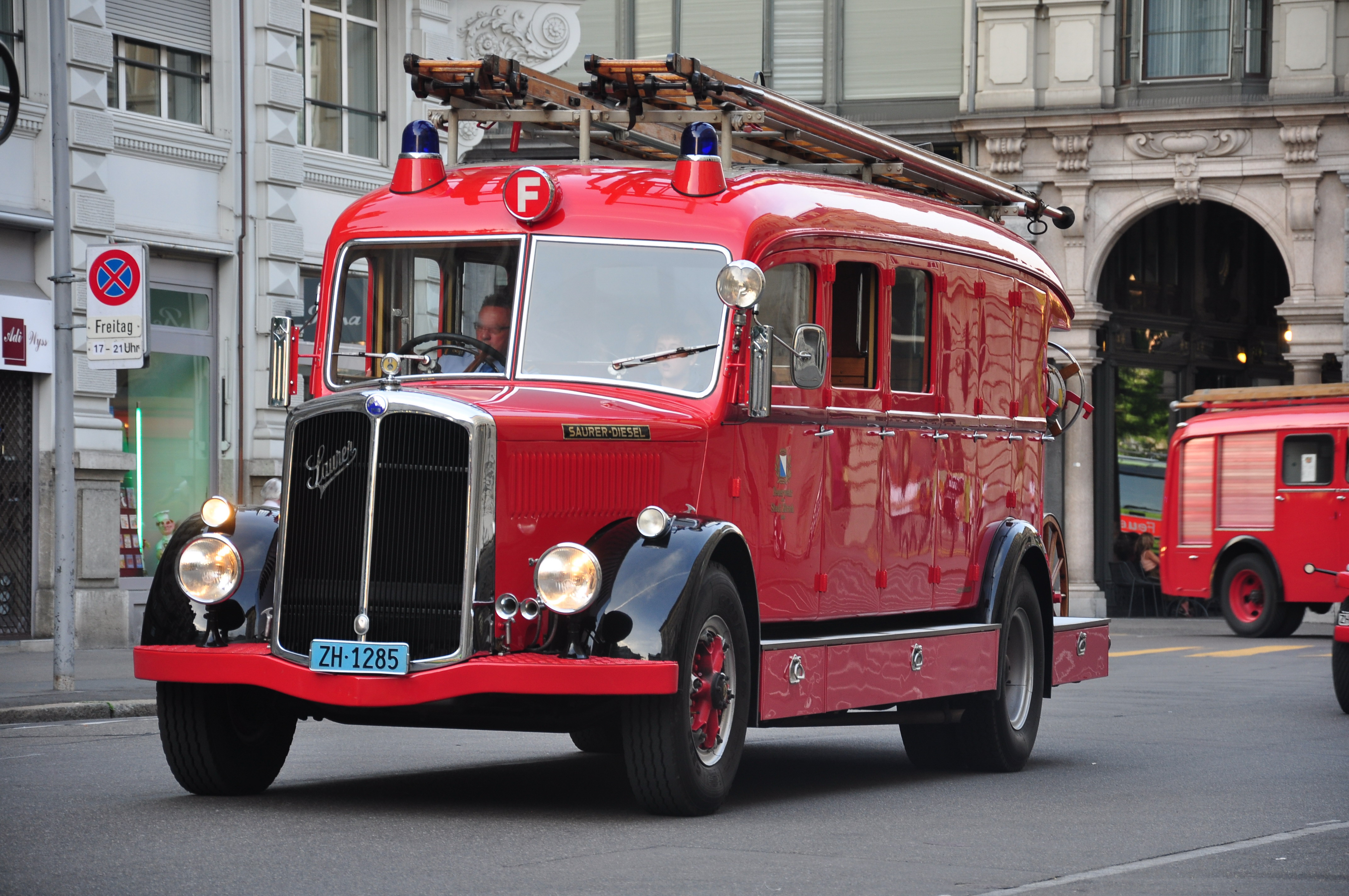
Saurer 4C

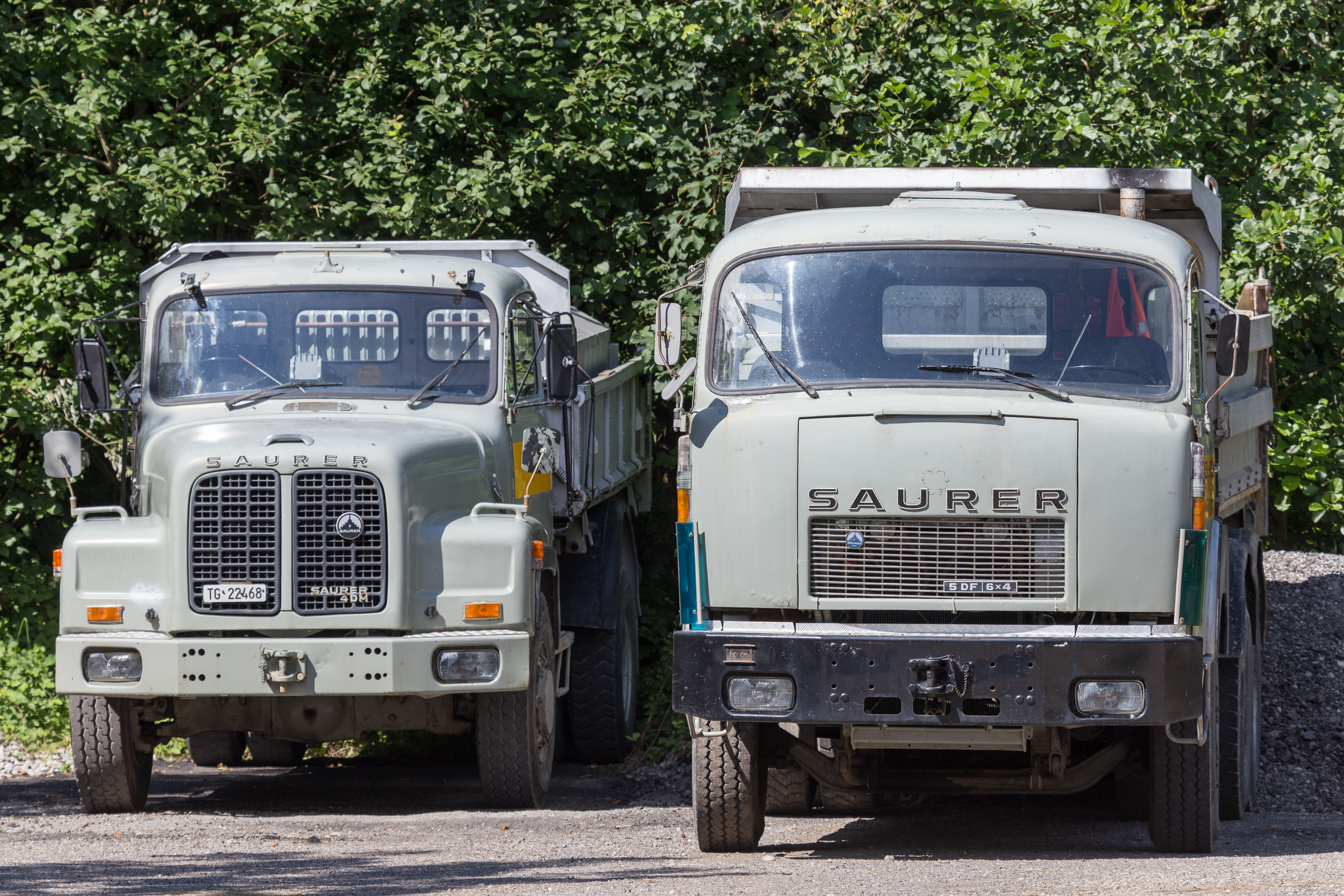
Saurer 4DM and 5DF

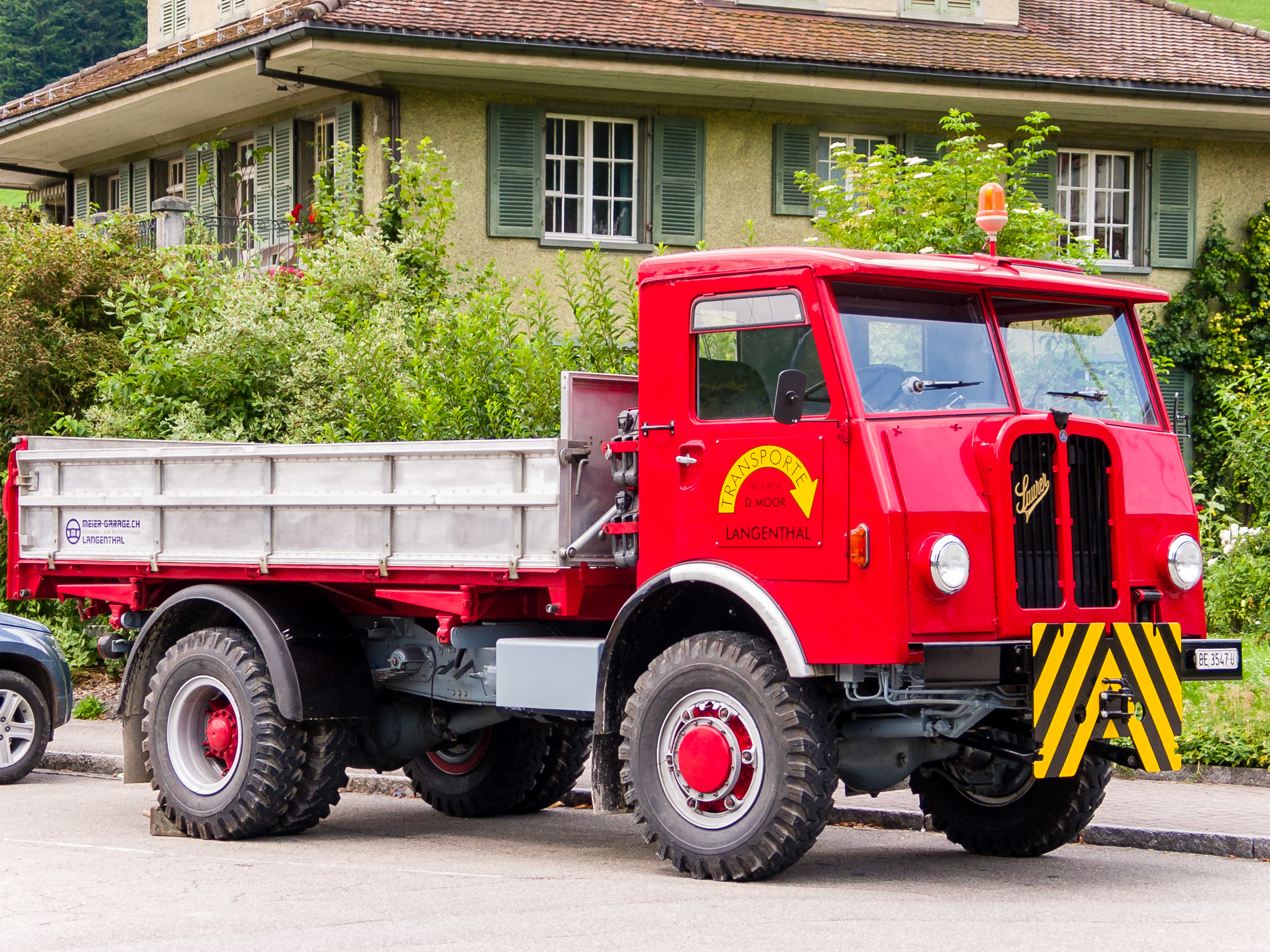
Saurer 5 CM

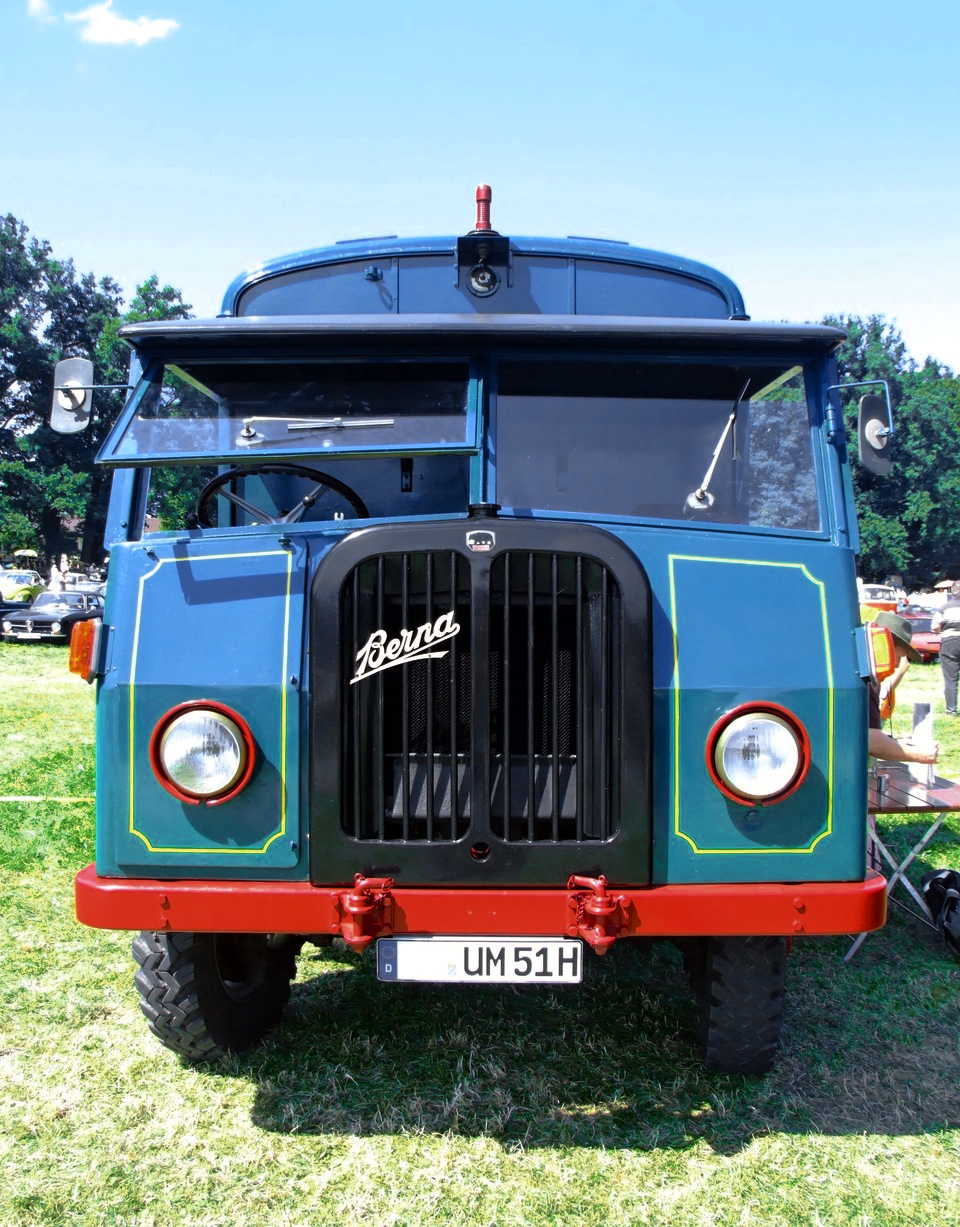
Berna (1951)

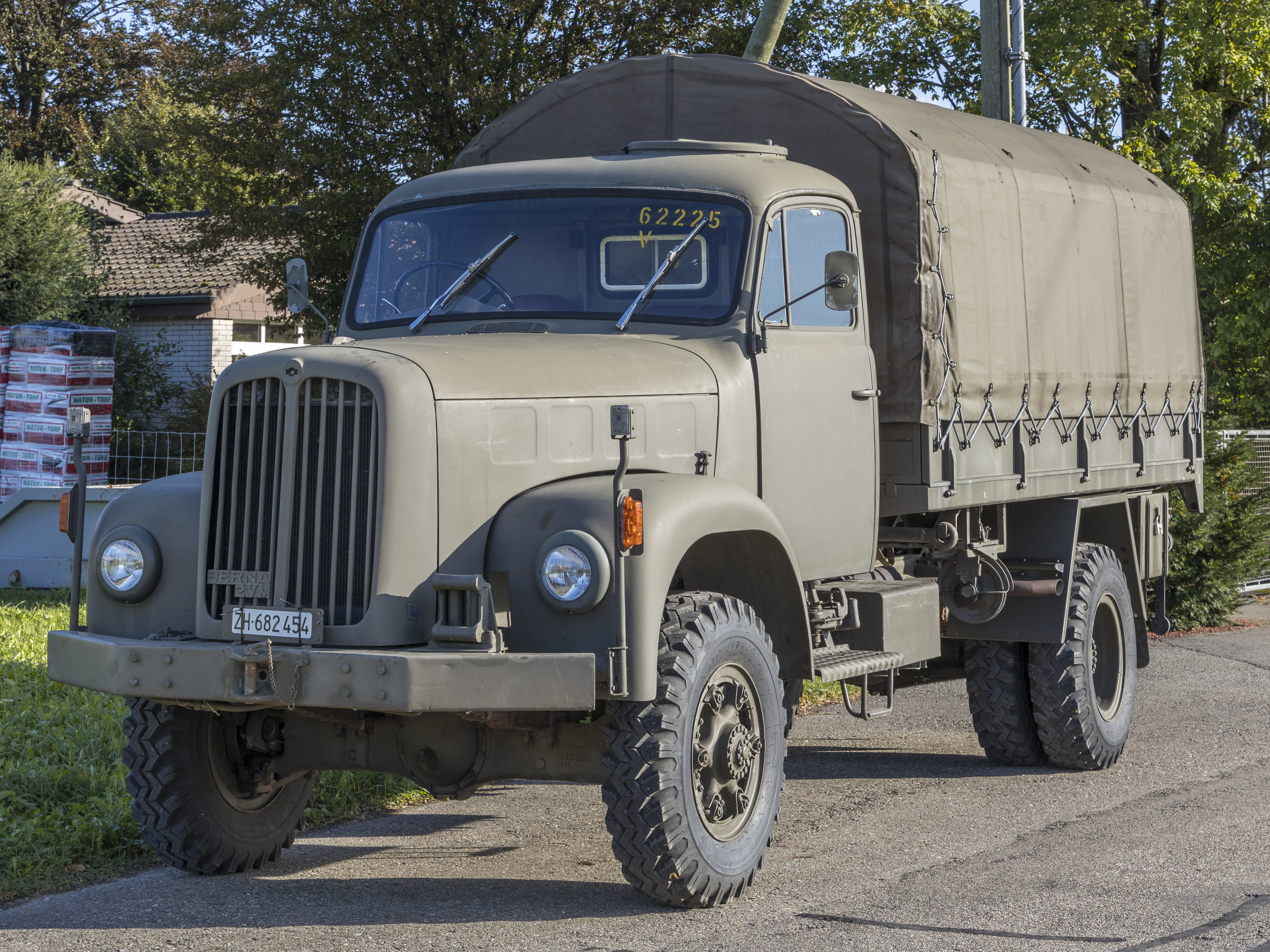
Berna 2VM

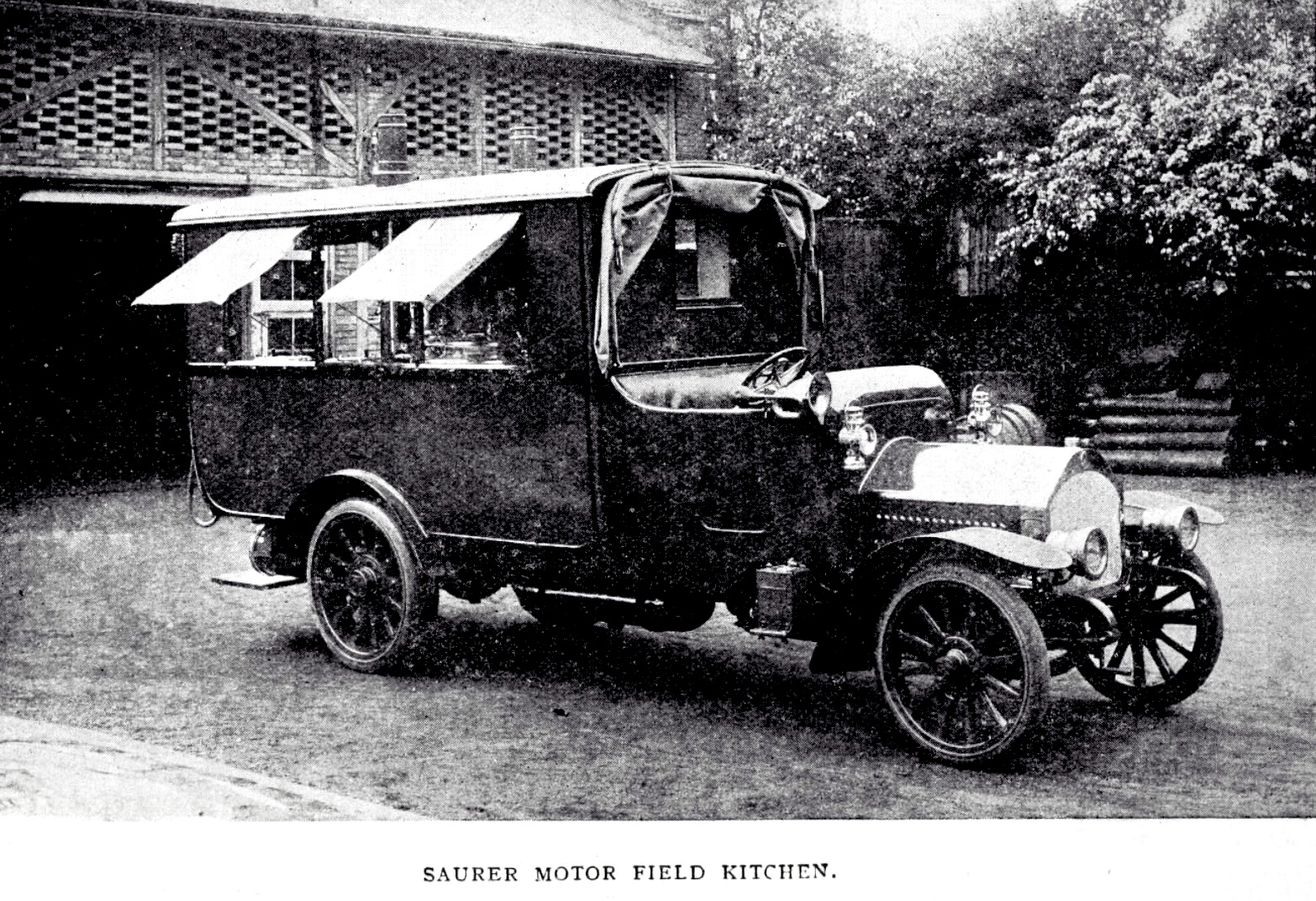
Saurer Motor Field Kitchen (1914)

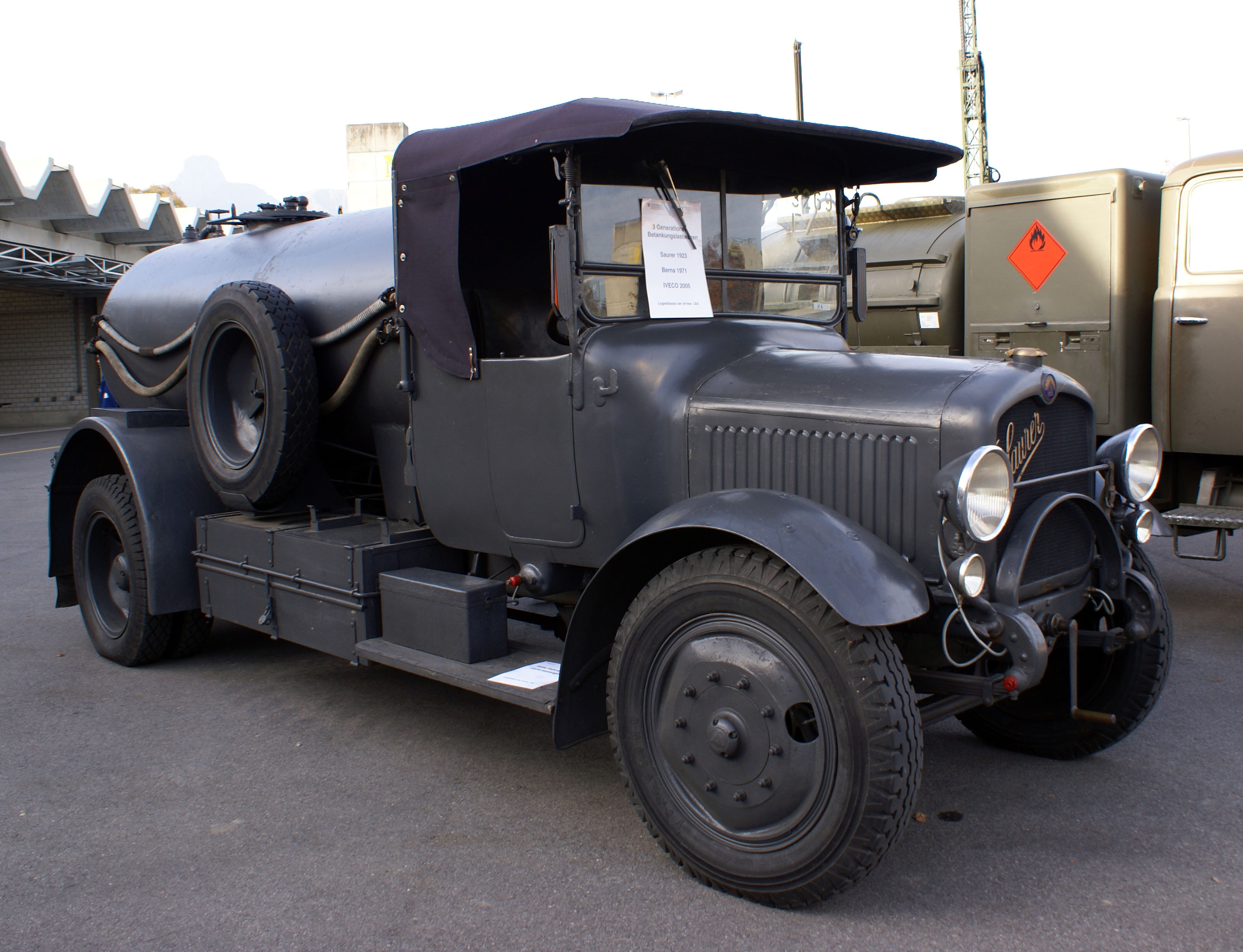
Tankwagen von 1923

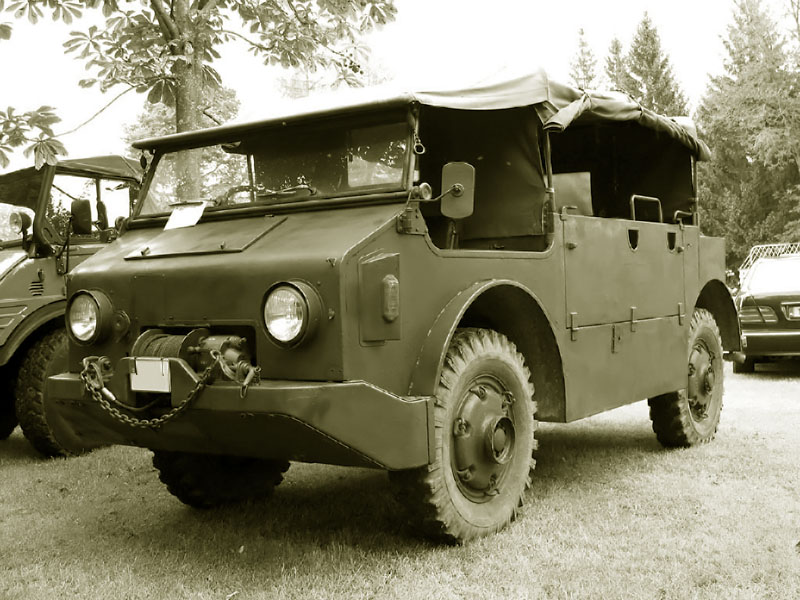
Saurer MH4 4x4 1954

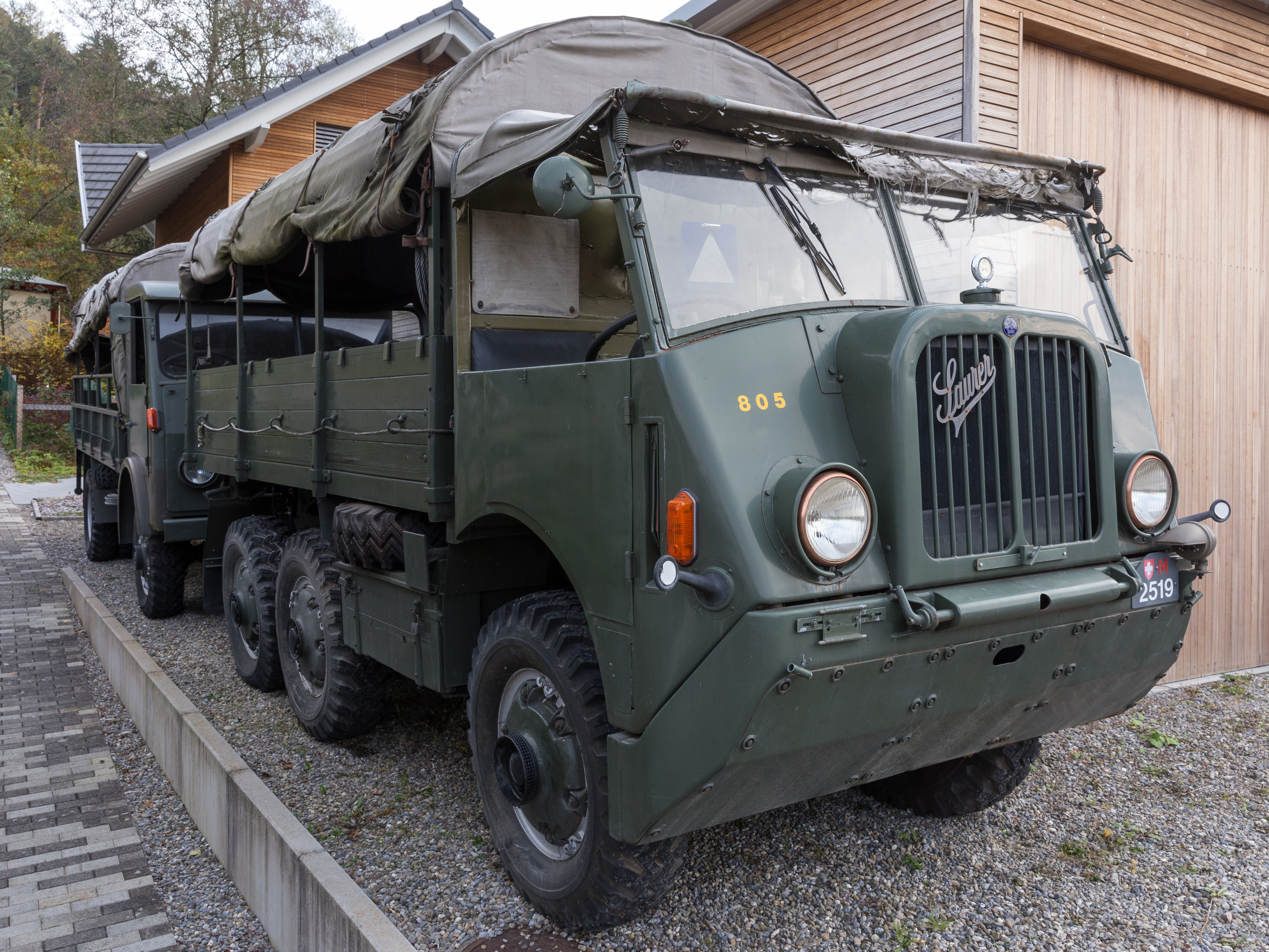
Saurer M6 (1940–46)

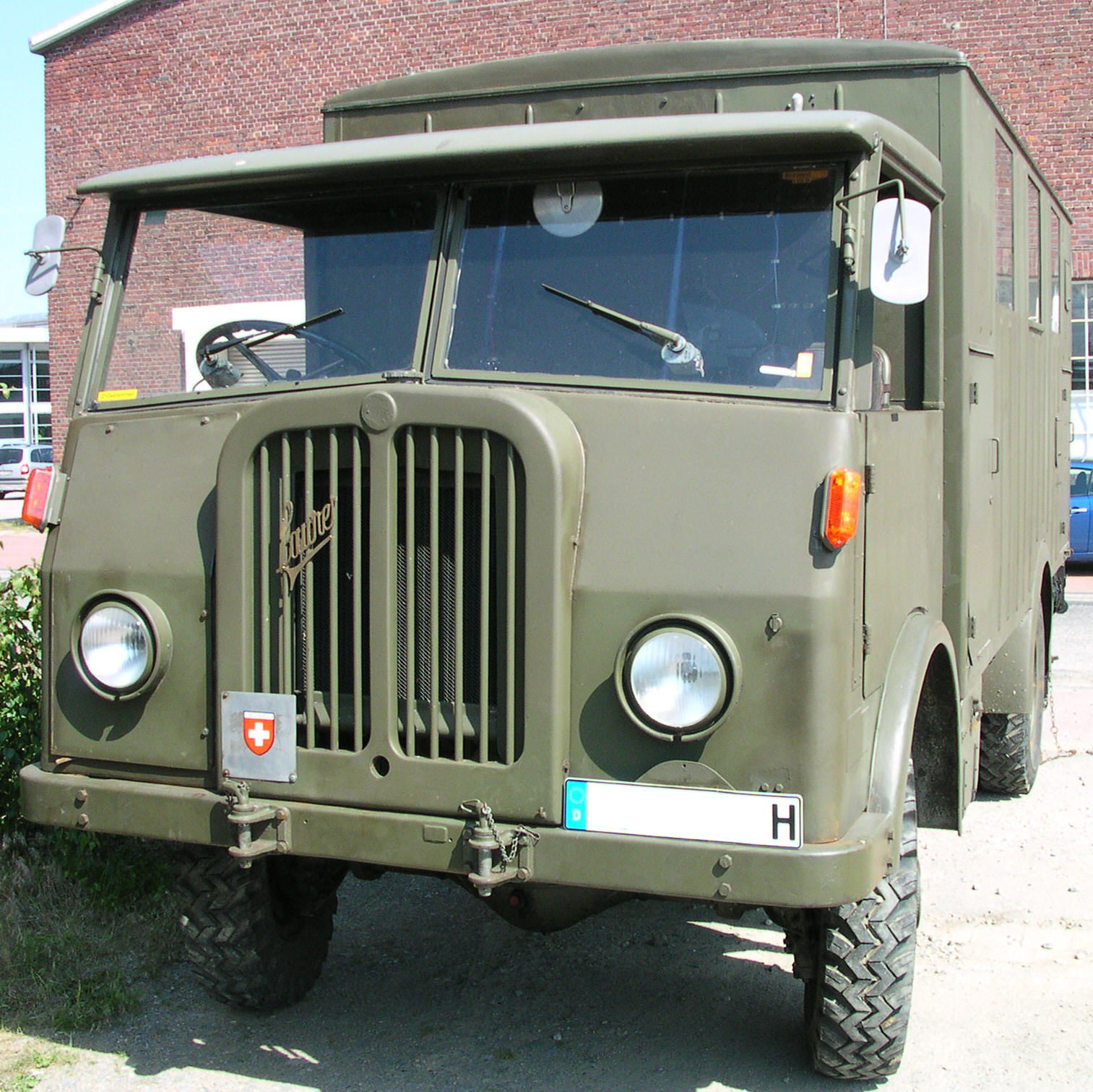
Saurer 2 CM

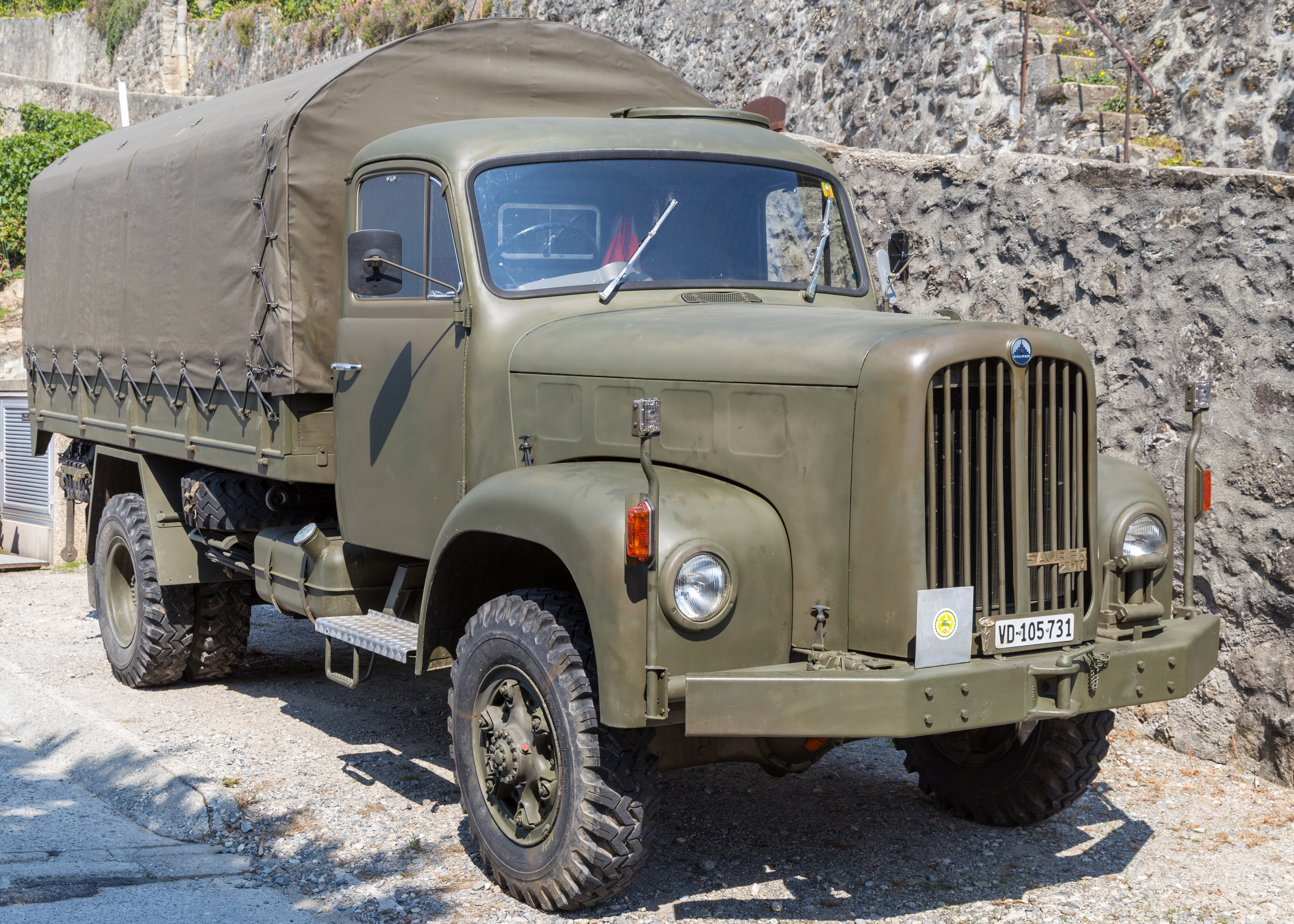
Saurer 2DM

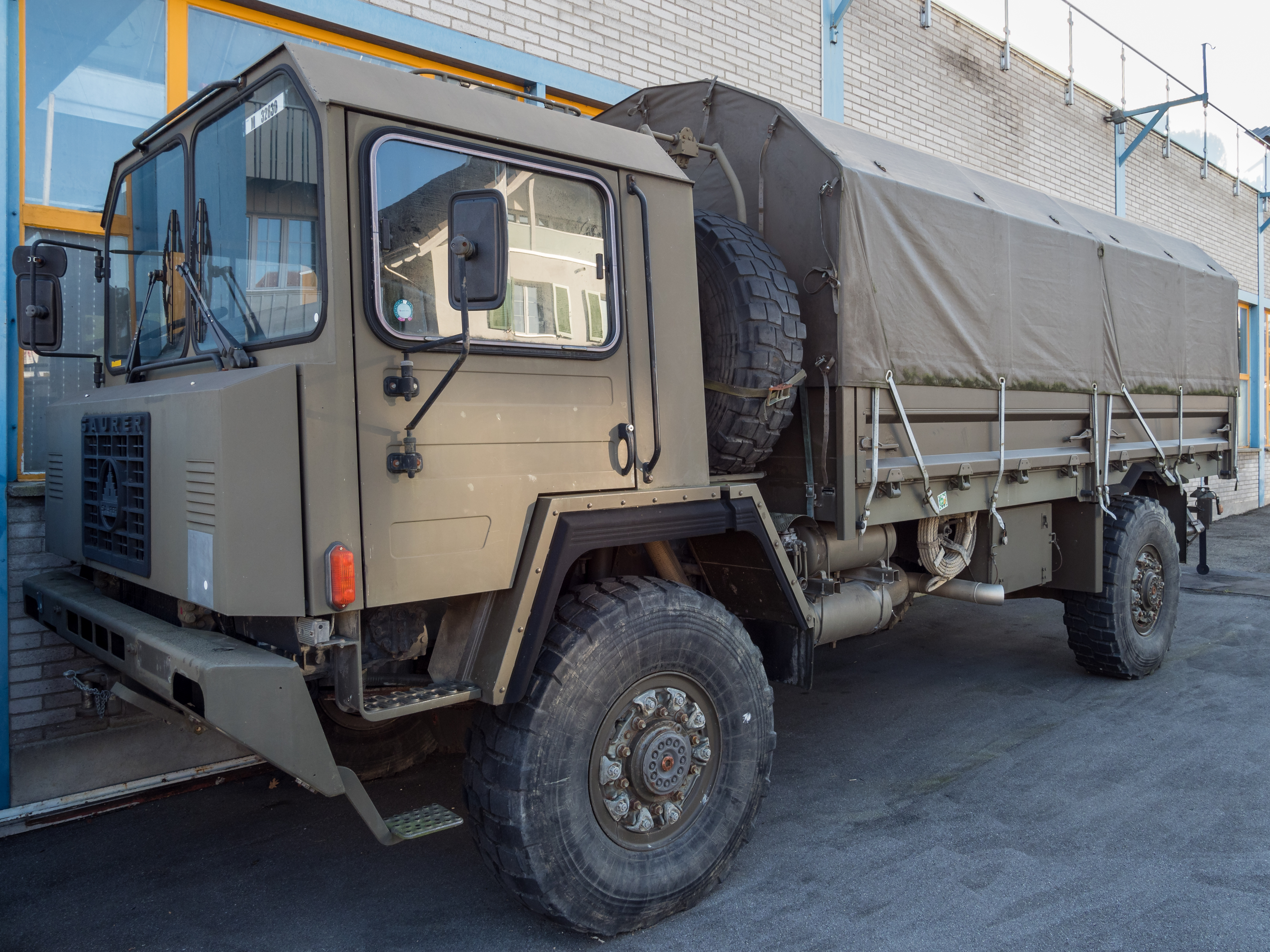
Saurer 6DM 4x4

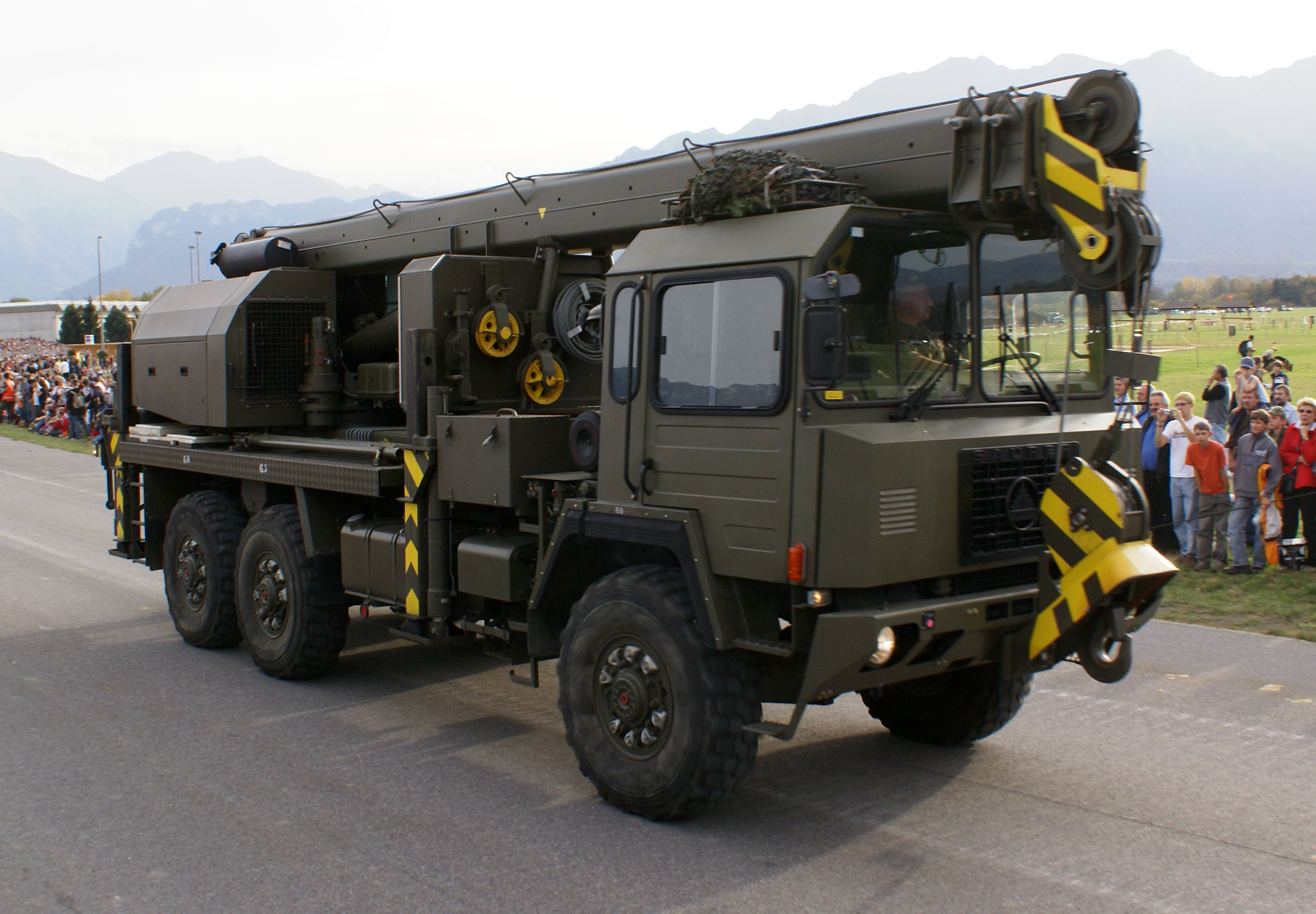
Saurer 10DM 6x6

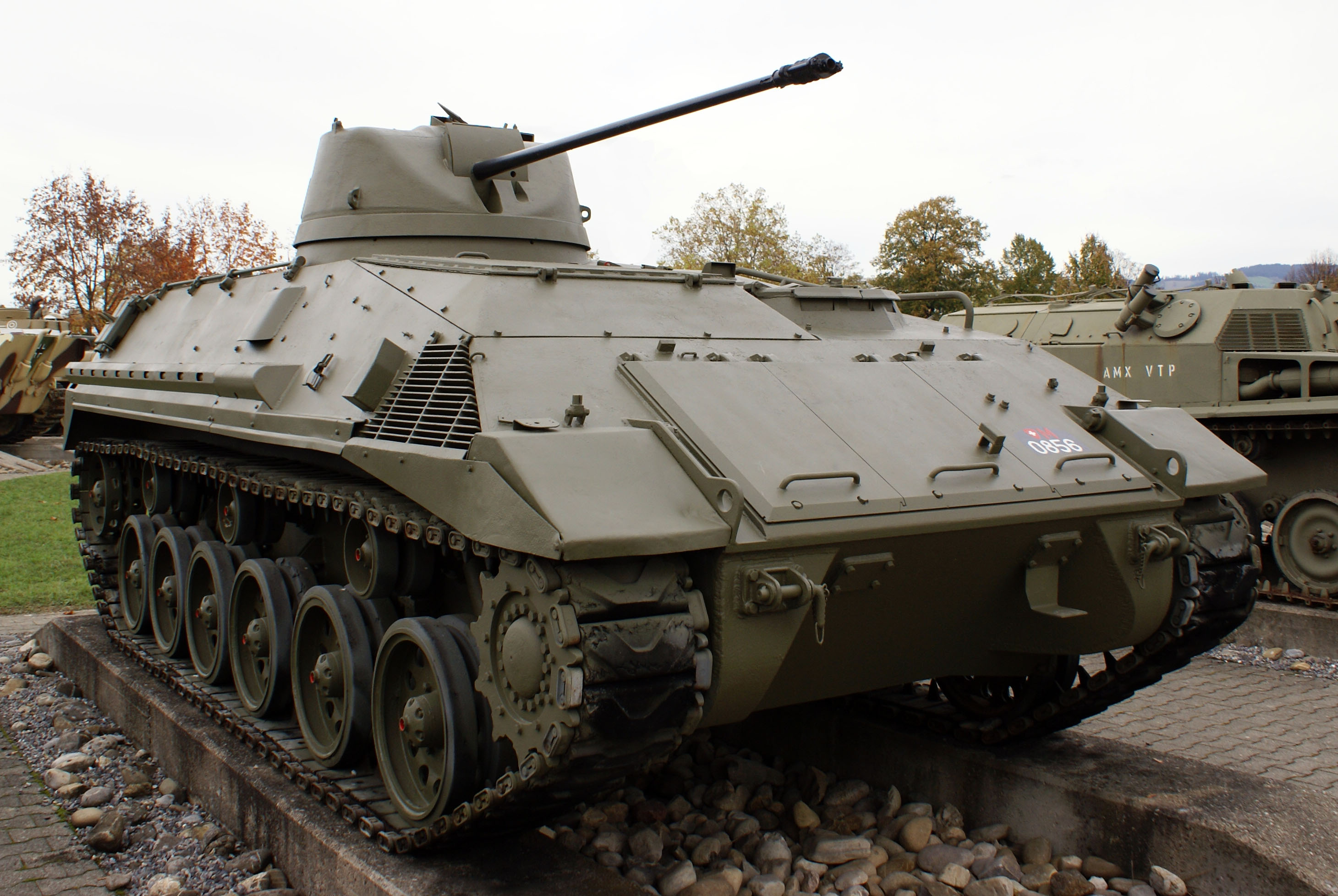
Saurer Tartaruga

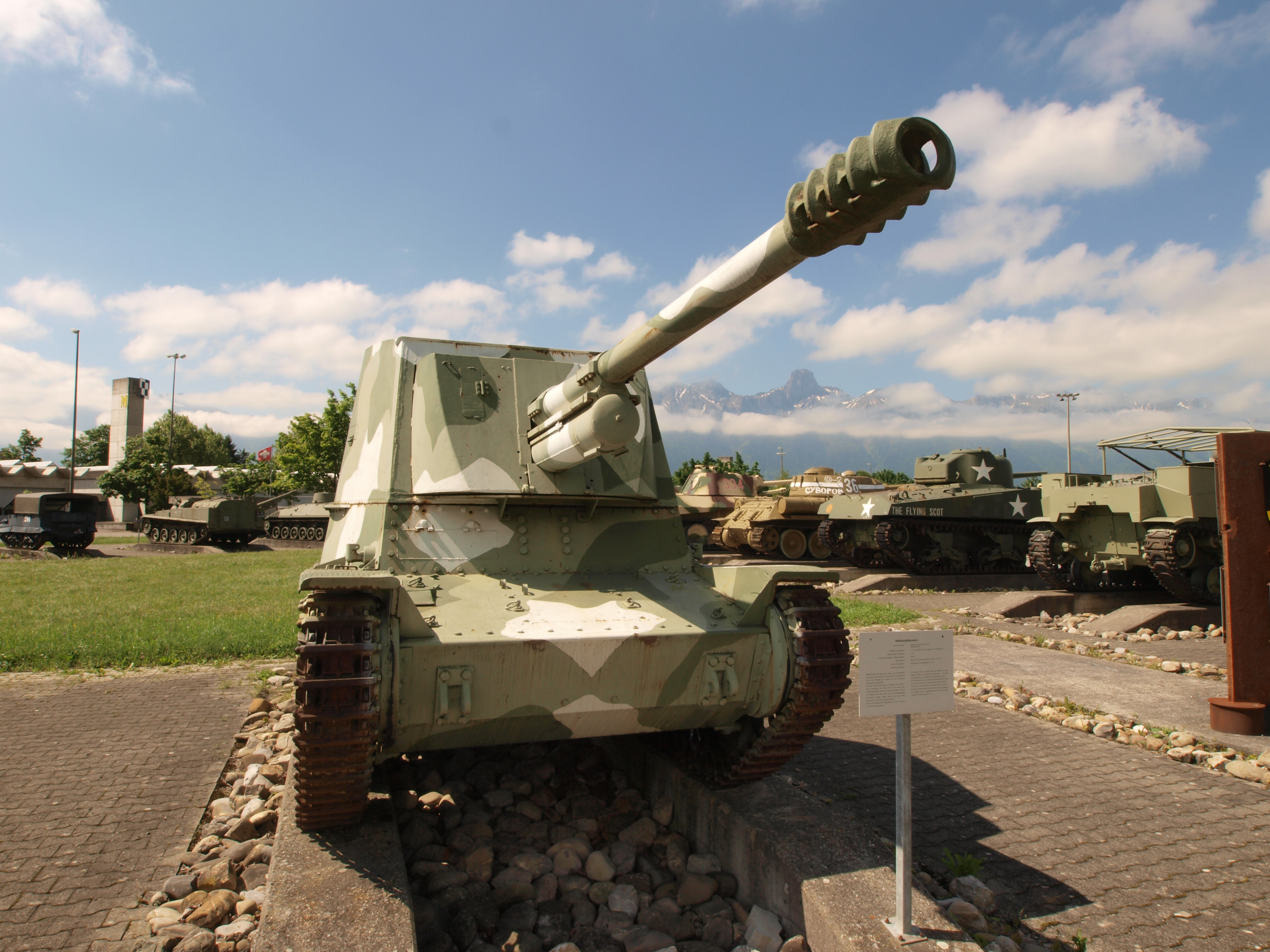
Nahkampfkanone 1

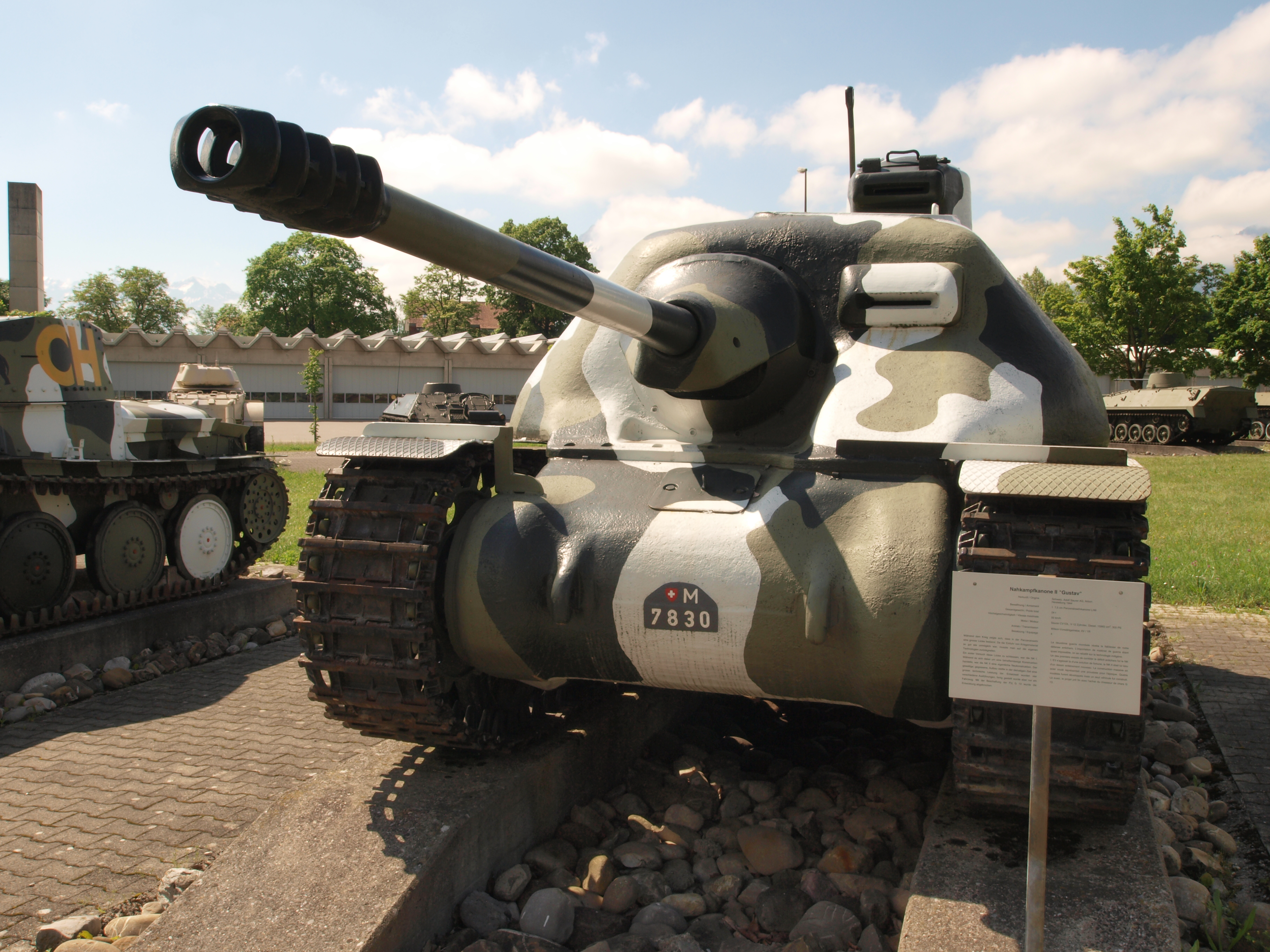
Nahkampfkanone 2

== See also ==
- Rolls-Royce Crecy: Like the FLB 1000 aero engine, was a two-stroke Diesel converted to petrol with fuel injection.

== Sources & References ==
- Biegger, Jürg. Swiss Post Buses in Transition 1906–2006. Uster: Transport Photo Archive. ISBN 3-905170-29-9
- Biegger Jürg. COE Coaches in Switzerland, 1936–1976. Uster: Transport Photo Archive. ISBN 3-905170-37-X
- Sahli, Kurt (2002). Saurer: Geschichte einer Nutzfahrzeugfabrik. 3rd ed. Bern: Verlag Stämpfli. ISBN 3-7272-1325-6
- Vehicles of the Swiss Army (book).
- "Oerlikon". Google Finance.
- "Historical Milestones". Œrlikon. Archived from the original on 2012-02-15.
- Federal Registry of Commerce Switzerland, Canton of Schwyz.
