= Saurer Tartaruga =

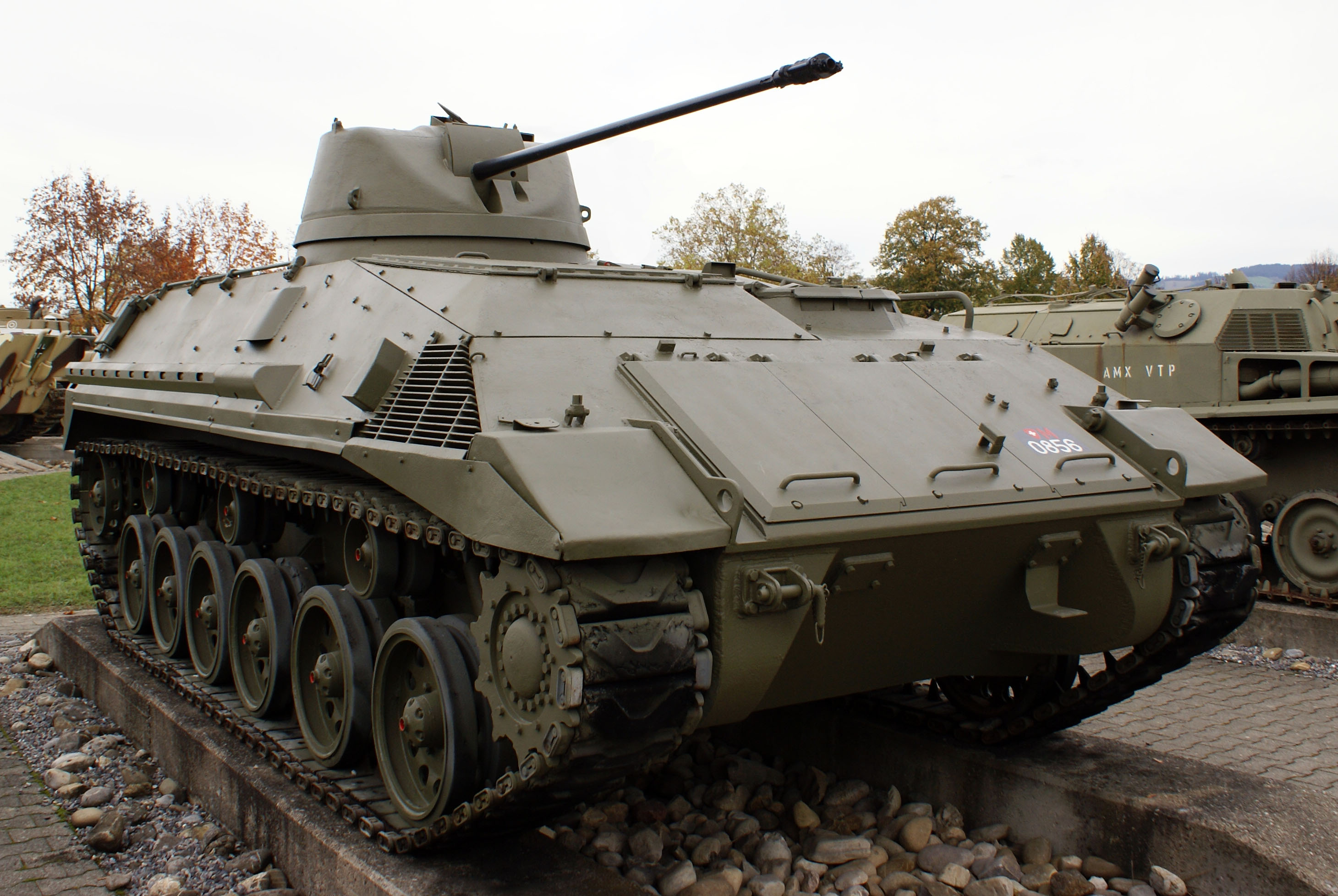
- Saurer Tartaruga at Panzermuseum Thun
- Type: Armored personnel carrier
- Place of origin: Switzerland

Service history
- Used by: Switzerland

Production history
- Manufacturer: Adolph Saurer AG.
- Produced: 1959
- No. built: 1

Specifications
- Mass: 20 tonnes
- Length: 6.10 m (240 in)
- Width: 2.90 m (114 in)
- Height: 1.80 m (71 in)
- Crew: 12: driver, commander, gunner +9 Panzergrenadiere
- Armour: up
- Main armament: 1x 20mm automatic cannon Oerlikon
- Engine: Saurer CH 5D V-8 cylinder diesel Displacement cm ³ 12670; 153 kW
- Suspension: torsion bar
- Operational range: 300km (0.8 L / km)

The Saurer Tartaruga (Turtle) was a prototype of an armored personnel carrier from the Adolph Saurer AG. The Saurer Tartaruga was built in 1959. Together with the Mowag Pirat it was tested by the Swiss Army. But unexpectedly the Swiss Army decided to buy the American M113. A prototype is now in the Thun tank museum.
