= PZInż Zawrat =

Zawrat
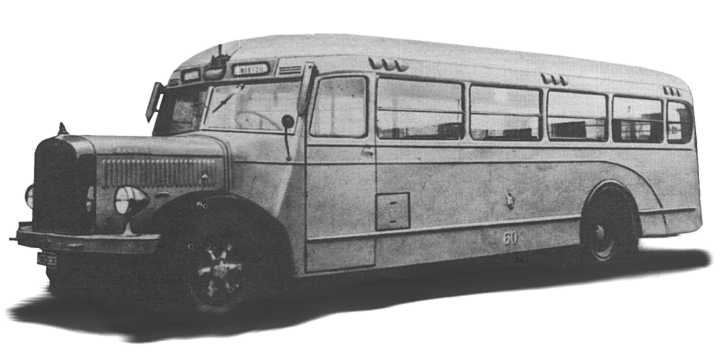

Overview
- Manufacturer: Państwowe Zakłady Inżynierii

Body and chassis
- Doors: 2

Powertrain
- Engine: Saurer BLD
- Capacity: 50

Dimensions
- Length: 9380 mm
- Width: 2275 mm
- Height: 2730 mm

Zawrat (also known as PZInż. 153) was a Polish bus brand produced by the Państwowe Zakłady Inżynieryjne (PZInż) holding between 1936 and 1937 for the city of Warsaw. Only 18 buses were completed before the series was cancelled. The last Zawrat bus remained in service in Warsaw until 1949.

The bus was based on a license-built chassis of the Saurer 3CT1D bus designed by Swiss Saurer company and a six-cylinder Saurer BLD engine, also license-built in Poland. The license for the chassis was bought in 1932 and initially 70 Saurer 3CT1D buses were completed entirely of Swiss-made parts. Until 1934 additional 43 chassis were completed, partially of parts produced in Poland. Some of those were finished with bus bodies, others were converted to 5-tonne lorries for the Polish Army.

In 1936 the PZInż designed a new all-metal body for the Saurer 3CT1D and named the new bus "Zawrat" after the pass in Tatra Mountains. The bus had two doors and seats for 50 passengers. In line with other buses of pre-war construction, the rear doors were used for entry to the vehicle. However, unlike all previous wooden-built buses used or tested in Warsaw (such as Büssing 650 TU, Somua SIX or Chevrolet EFD FS 183) the Zawrat had a completely closed passenger cabin, without an open platform at the rear.

The first 12 buses were delivered to Warsaw in 1936 and on 13 July 1936 the first new "T" line started to operate them. By the end of the next year 6 additional buses were delivered, which allowed for creation or extension of five new bus lines.

While spacious, the type proved cumbersome to operate. The chassis proved too rigid, making turning in the narrow streets of downtown Warsaw a difficult task. Also the diesel engine proved too loud. Because of that already in 1938 the Zawrat buses were relegated to suburban service, where their disadvantages were less of a problem.

During World War II most of Warsaw's Zawrat buses were mobilised by the army and eventually destroyed. Some bodies of Zawrat still in Warsaw were converted in 1943 to makeshift tramway cars as the Germans stole much of the fleet of Warsaw Tramways. The last surviving Zawrat (body number 53) was returned to service after the war and served in the ruined city until 1949.
