= Trolleybuses in Schaffhausen =

Schaffhausen trolleybus system
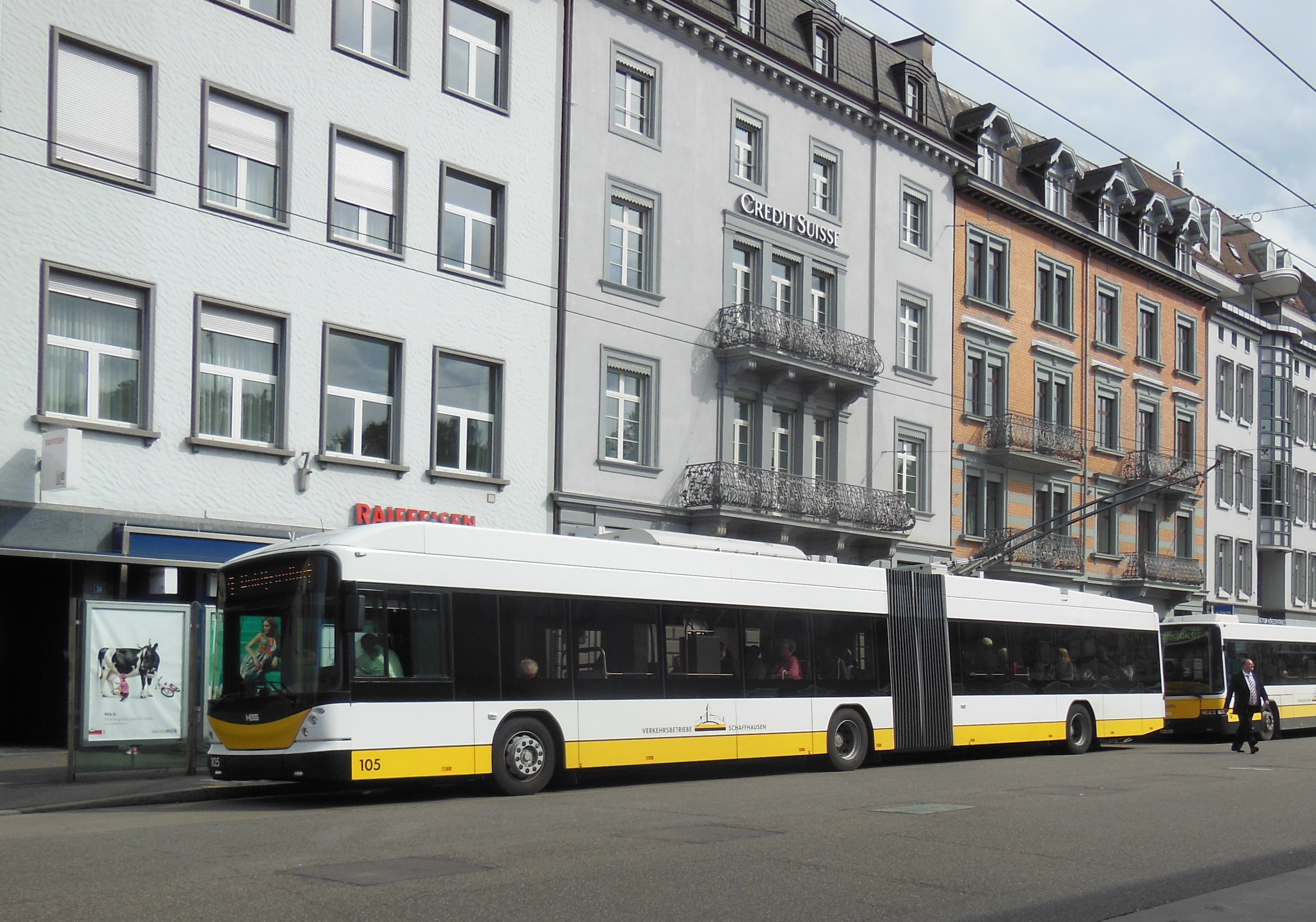
- Hess Swisstrolley no. 105 outside Schaffhausen railway station, 2012

Operation
- Locale: Schaffhausen, Switzerland
- Open: 24 September 1966
- Close: 14 December 2025
- Status: Closed
- Routes: 1 (1966–2025); 2 (1974–c. 1991); 9 (1980–1995)
- Operator: Verkehrsbetriebe Schaffhausen (VBSH)

Statistics
- Route length: 14.5 km (9.0 mi)
Overview
- Website: https://web.archive.org/web/20121023110752/http://www.vbsh.ch/ Verkehrsbetriebe Schaffhausen (VBSH) (in German)

The Schaffhausen trolleybus system (Swiss Standard German: Trolleybussystem Schaffhausen) was part of the public transport network of Schaffhausen, capital city of the canton of Schaffhausen, Switzerland, and the adjacent town of Neuhausen am Rheinfall in the same canton. Operated by Verkehrsbetriebe Schaffhausen (VBSH), it was Switzerland's youngest such system and had been its smallest since 1984.

Opened in 1966, the trolleybus system replaced the Schaffhausen tramway network, which opened in 1901. As of the December 2025 timetable change, the trolleybus system was closed, and since then services are operated by battery electric buses, like the other lines of VBSH. The system's last operating cross-city route, designated as line 1, connected, among other points, Schaffhausen railway station with the Rhine Falls. With 3.45 million passengers annually (as of 2011), line 1 is by far the busiest of all of VBSH's routes.

== History ==
=== Origins and extensions ===
The conversion of the Schaffhausen Waldfriedhof–Neuhausen Zentrum tramway to trolleybus operation was the consequence of a popular vote (referendum) held on 13 September 1964. The trams providing the service at the time were between 43 and 63 years old, the oldest being from the opening of the tramway in 1901. The changeover occurred seamlessly, over the break between 23 and 24 September 1966, with the latter being the first day of trolleybus service. However, the trolleybus line that emerged from the tramway line ran initially only as far as Ebnat at the Schaffhausen end, whereas the tramway had continued one stop further, to the Waldfriedhof (forest cemetery) in the St. Niklausen district. At first, the trolleybuses operated every ten minutes at normal times, and every five minutes during peak times. Ten trolleybuses had been ordered from Berna for the new system, five (Nos. 201–205) five articulated (Nos. 101–105) and five two-axle (201–205), but only the articulated units had been delivered in time for the opening, so five two-axle trolleybuses from the Winterthur trolleybus system (Nos. 20-21, 23–25) were borrowed and used in rush hour service in the first months of the new system. They had been on loan since mid-1966 and used for driver training before the system opened. Schaffhausen's five two-axle Berna trolleybuses were delivered in early 1967, and the loaned vehicles were returned to Winterthur during 1967.

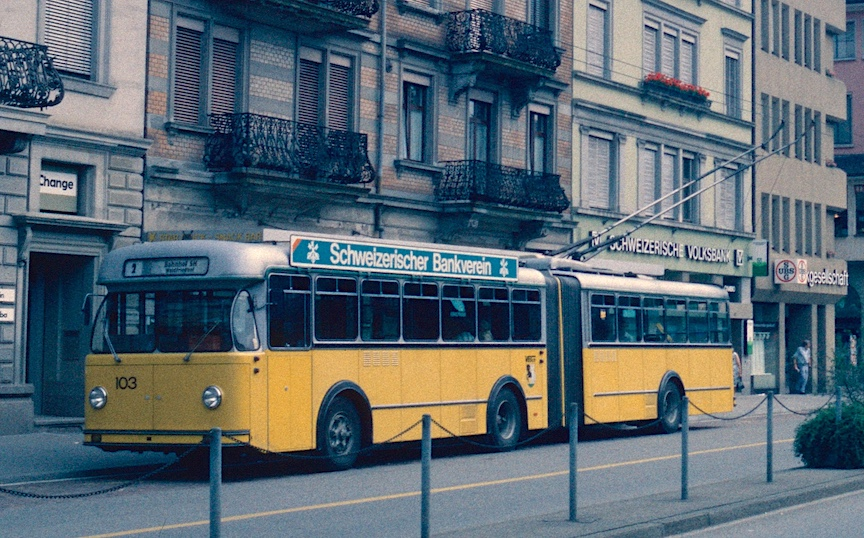
An articulated example from the system's original fleet of 1966 Berna-built trolleybuses, across from the railway station

The trolleybus system also took over the former tram depot, which was then at Cardinal, on the site of today's central fire station.

Only in the spring of 1970 was the trolleybus system extended from Ebnat to the St. Niklausen residential area, which the tramway had served. Since then, St. Niklausen has been connected into the system via a 1.9 km (1.2 mi) long clockwise operating balloon loop, by which the trolleybuses pass through the nominal terminus at Waldfriedhof without a lengthy layover. During rush hour, some trips continued to terminate at the original Ebnat terminus.

On 29 May 1974, another new section of line, an almost 1 km (0.62 mi) long Ebnat–Herblingertal section, opened for service. This was a branch off of the Waldfriedhof route at Ebnat. The new branch was served only in rush hour, and VBSH introduced a second trolleybus route number for it: Line 2, Neuhausen–Herblingertal. This reinforcement service was operated by four two-axle trolleybuses. Line 2 replaced the peak-period supplementary duties on line 1, which continued to terminate at Waldfriedhof (St. Niklausen) and did not serve the new branch to Herblingertal.

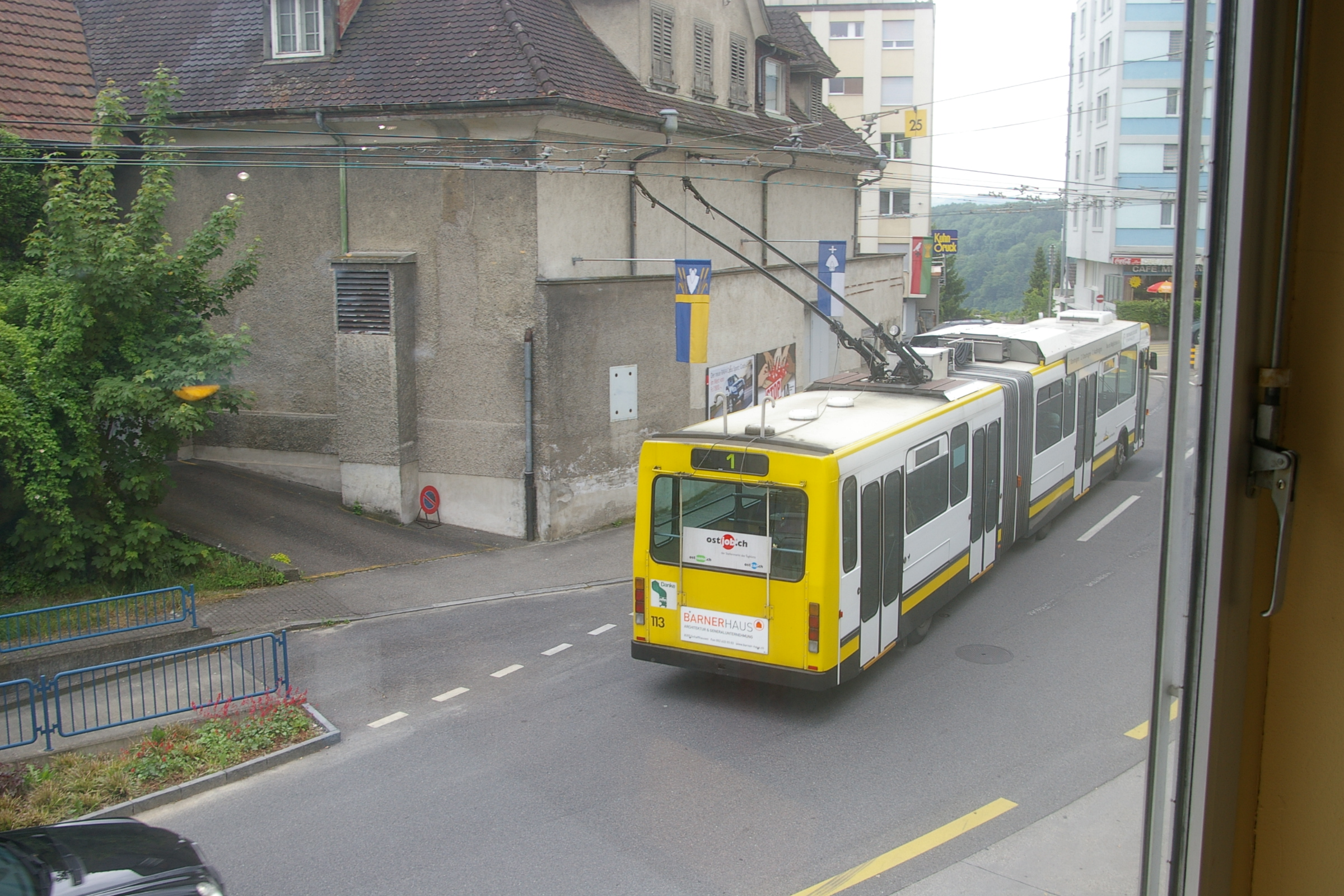
No. 113 in Neuhausen Zentrum. Until 1980, the route ended here and reversed towards Schaffhausen at the junction in the background.

On 4 August 1980, there was an extension at the other end of the system, when the section from Neuhausen Zentrum to Neuhausen Herbstäcker went into operation, and the services were reorganized. At the outer end of the Herbstäcker extension, another balloon loop was constructed, served in the counterclockwise direction. The opening of this extension led to the introduction of a third route number, because not all service ran through to Herbstäcker. Line 1 was extended over the new section at all times, but trips running only as far as Neuhausen Zentrum from Waldfriedhof were renumbered as line 2, and the peak-hours-only service running from Herblingertal to Neuhausen Zentrum was renumbered as line 9.

On 31 May 1987, the VBSH opened a new trolleybus and motor bus depot in the Herblingertal, at Ebnatstrasse 145. The depot, which remains in use today, replaced the old depot from the tramway era, and was originally connected with the rest of the trolleybus system via the overhead wires of line 9.

=== Further developments ===
Since the end of the 1980s, route number 2 has no longer been used. However, some services, designated as line 1, continue to terminate at Neuhausen Zentrum; they are scheduled on weekends and holidays.

In 1991/92, Schaffhausen's first generation trolleybus fleet of Berna vehicles was replaced with a new fleet, of NAW/Hess articulated units.

On 20 September 1995, line 9 was discontinued, after 21 years of operation. Since then, the former line 9 route has been served by motor bus route 6, which also serves the affected section in the Herblingertal only in peak times. To compensate for the shutdown of line 9, line 1 services were increased, to run at 7.5-minute intervals during rush hour.

Since the closure of line 9, the 0.8 km (0.50 mi) long Ebnat–Depot section has been used only for non-passenger carrying trips, and has served outgoing and incoming trolleybuses on line 1. The 0.3 km (0.19 mi) long Depot–Herblingertal section can still be used for special excursions.

Until 14 December 2003, motor bus line 6, which also ran to Neuhausen, was diverted during peak times to combine with line 1 to offer a service at condensed, 7.5-minute intervals. Since then, the Schaffhausen trolleybuses have run all day on a rigid timetable of one trolleybus every ten minutes.

From 1 July 2007 to 22 September 2008, the former level crossing on the High Rhine Railway at Zollstrasse was replaced by an underpass. During the conversion work for this alteration, trolleybuses could run only to Neuhausen Zentrum, and the remaining section of the line was served for one year by replacement rigid motor buses. However, the trolleybus system ultimately benefited from this work, as the level crossing barriers had previously hampered its operation.

=== Revitalisation ===
In the first decade of the 21st century, the continued existence of the Schaffhausen trolleybus system was called into question, on grounds of cost. The feasibility of switching to either diesel buses or gas powered buses was examined in detail. However, and following thorough discussions, the city council decided in 2008, for ecological reasons – and despite the slightly higher operating costs – to retain the electrically powered bus services. In September 2008, the City Parliament voted in favour of a corresponding resolution, paving the way for the acquisition of new low-floor articulated trolleybuses.

On 1 May 2010, Elektrizitätswerk des Kantons Schaffhausen AG (EKS AG) took over from the Verkehrsbetriebe Schaffhausen the responsibility for maintenance of the trolleybus overhead wires.

Meanwhile, planning began for a second trolleybus line. In the medium term, it was intended to convert the 8.4 km (5.2 mi) long motor bus line 3 (Sommerwies-Krummacker) to electrical operation. Such a conversion would have almost doubled the length of the overhead wire network.

=== Closure ===
After the motor bus fleet of VBSH was converted to battery electric buses, it was intended to discontinue the remaining trolleybus service in 2029 and convert line 1 accordingly. However, due to scheduled construction work along the route, which would have made it necessary to move the overhead lines, it was decided to convert line 1 to battery electric buses already in December 2025, closing the trolleybus system earlier than previously planned. The last day of the autumn 2025 schedule period, 13 December, was the last day of normal trolleybus operation, with battery buses entering service on route 1 the following day, and diesel buses were already covering some runs on route 1, with trolleybuses on some runs. However, VBSH decided to put two trolleybuses into service on 14 December, as extra runs added to the normal service, from 1:00 p.m. to 4:00 p.m. only and running fare-free, to give interested riders an opportunity for a farewell ride on a Schaffhausen trolleybus. The final day of trolleybus service was therefore Sunday, 14 December 2025, the first day of the winter timetable.

== Routes ==
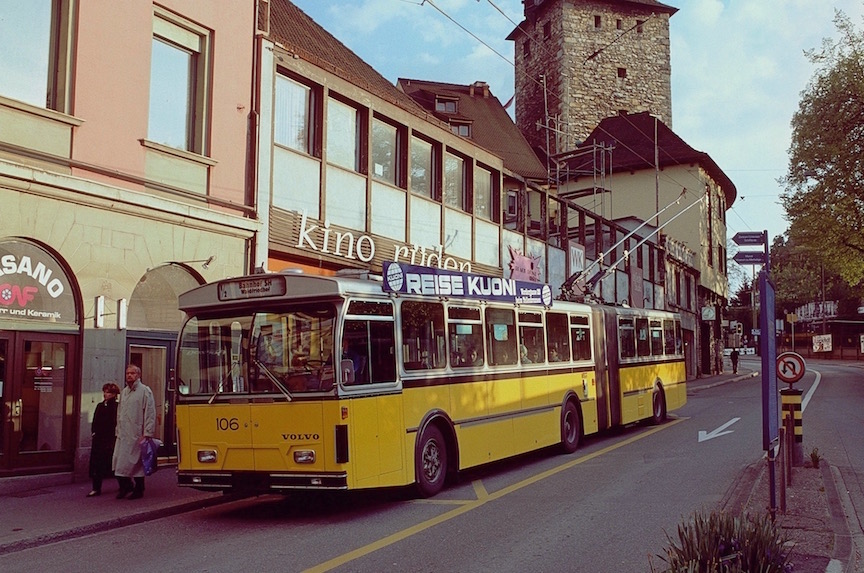
Volvo trolleybus No. 106 on line 1/2 (combined lines 1 and 2) in 1991

As of 2012, Schaffhausen's single trolleybus route, designated as line 1, connected the Waldfriedhof in the town of Schaffhausen with the Herbstäcker residential area in the neighbouring municipality of Neuhausen am Rheinfall. Thus, it also connected the town with the Rhine Falls, a major tourist attraction. Previously, two other lines, numbered 2 and 9, were also operated by trolleybuses.

Following two extensions, line 1 was 7.7 km (4.8 mi) long for trolleybuses travelling from Schaffhausen to Neuhausen and 6.8 km (4.2 mi) long for trolleybuses travelling in the opposite direction, from Neuhausen to Schaffhausen.

== Fleet ==
=== First generation (Berna) ===
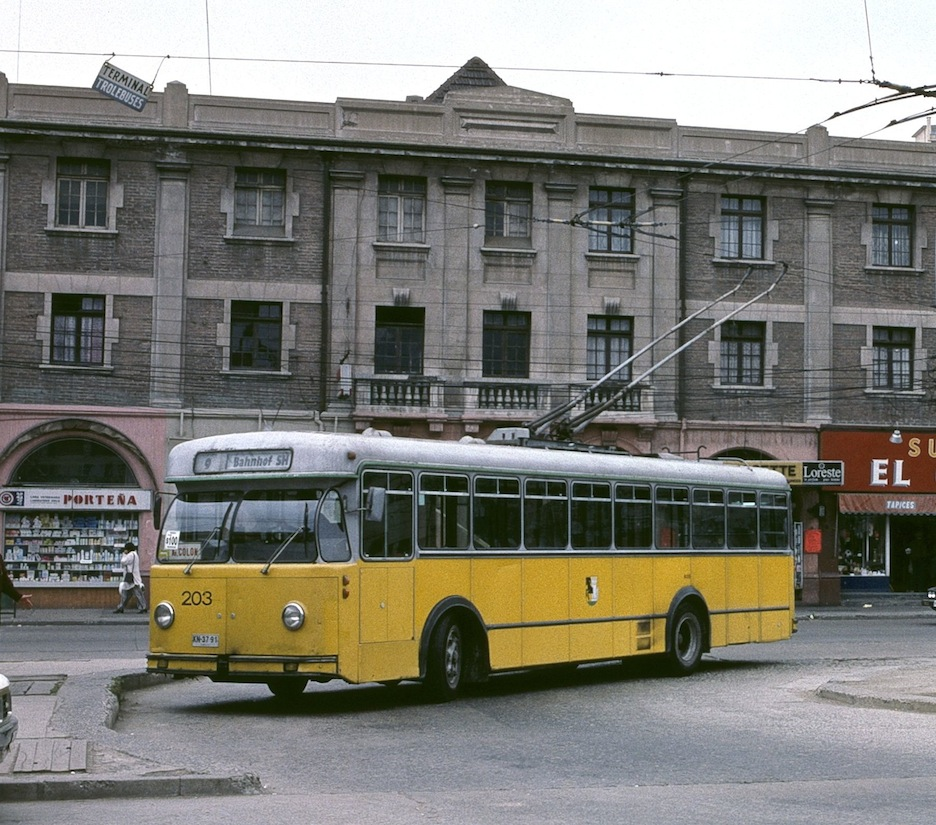
The Berna-built Schaffhausen trolleybus no. 203 from 1966, shown here in service on the Valparaíso trolleybus system in 1996, still in its old livery

Schaffhausen's first-generation trolleybuses, procured in 1966, were made by Berna, a Swiss manufacturer. They consisted of five articulated buses, nos. 101 to 105, and five rigid (two-axle) buses, nos. 201 to 205. As the non-articulated vehicles had been completed by time the system was opened, similar vehicles from the Winterthur trolleybus system were used initially to help out.

After the first-generation vehicles were withdrawn from service in 1991/1992, three of them – nos. 102, 103 and 203 – were transferred to the Valparaíso trolleybus system in Chile, in December 1992. There, no. 102 was retired in 2009 as a result of a technical malfunction, while no. 203 remained in service for more than 24 years, until May 2017. Meanwhile, no. 101 was scrapped, and no. 104 went to Winterthur as spare parts. No. 202 now belongs to the Trolleybusverein Schweiz (Swiss Trolleybus Society) (TVS).

An eleventh articulated vehicle, no. 106, was procured shortly after the launch of line 9. It was delivered in spring 1975 and entered service on 9 July 1975. Manufactured by Volvo, its body was supplied by Hess and was a design then known as the "Swiss Standard" bus body - a type also in the Lucerne trolleybus system at the time (and also Bern and systems, but on different chassis on most other systems). It remained a unique vehicle in Schaffhausen, and in 1999 it was sold to Lucerne for spare parts.

In 1980, due to the extension of the system to Herbstäcker, two used rigid vehicles, both built in 1961, made their way from Lucerne to Schaffhausen. With a total of 13 trolleybuses, the Schaffhausen fleet thus reached its historical peak. The two ex-Lucerne vehicles, nos. 206 (formerly Lucerne 226) and 207 (formerly Lucerne 227) were in service until 1991.

=== Second generation (NAW/Hess) ===
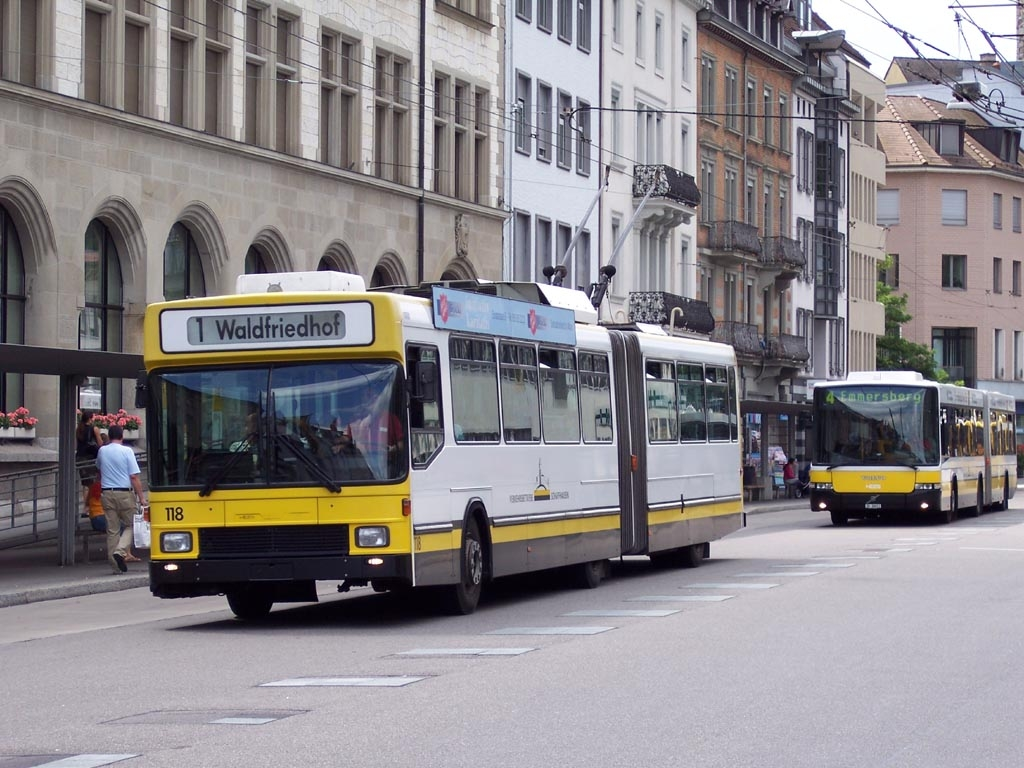
BGT 5-25 no. 118 opposite the Schaffhausen railway station, 2005

The second-generation vehicles, of type BGT 5-25, were built in 1991/1992. They replaced the 1966-built vehicles, and the two ex-Lucerne buses. A joint production of the Swiss companies Carrosserie Hess, NAW and ABB, they were given the fleet nos. 111 to 118.

One of the BGT 5-25s, no. 114, was laid up in late 2007, and thereafter served as a source of spare parts. It was eventually replaced in January 2009 by a general-purpose diesel-powered articulated bus. With only seven operational trolleybuses, the system's fleet reached its all-time low at that time. The reason for the withdrawal of no. 114 from service was a fire in the grounds of the system's depot, due to a technical malfunction in the vehicle's auxiliary motor.

Some of the second generation trolleybuses had their rollsigns replaced in their twilight years of service with modern dot-matrix displays.

=== Third generation (Swisstrolley) ===
Due to their advanced age, the second-generation vehicles, which were of high-floor configuration, were replaced in 2011 by seven low-floor Carrosserie Hess articulated trolleybuses of type Swisstrolley 3 (fleet nos. 101 to 107). The city of Schaffhausen had decided on 20 April 2010 to order these new vehicles, at a total cost of SFr 10.5 million.

The first two Swisstrolleys arrived in Schaffhausen on 29 June 2011, and the last followed in September 2011. Six of these units were needed for normal operation of line 1, and the seventh vehicle was a reserve. With the early closure of the system in 2025, it is intended to sell the trolleybuses to other operators.

== See also ==
- List of trolleybus systems in Switzerland
- Transport in Switzerland
