= List of trolleybus systems in Switzerland =

This is a list of trolleybus systems in Switzerland. It includes all trolleybus systems, past and present.

== Alphabetical list by principal city ==
Location	Date (from)	Date (to)	Notes
Altstätten	8 September 1940	21 May 1977	Connected Altstätten and Berneck. Known as the Rheintal or Rhine Valley system, after the operator's name, Rheintalische Verkehrsbetriebe. Had unusual voltage of 1000 V.
Basel	31 July 1941	30 June 2008	Operated by BVB. See also Trolleybuses in Basel.
Bern	29 October 1940		Operated by Bernmobil. See also Trolleybuses in Bern.
Biel/Bienne	19 October 1940		Operated by VB/TPB. See also Trolleybuses in Biel/Bienne.
Cernier, Val-de-Ruz	1 September 1948	14 April 1984	Connected Les Hauts-Geneveys, Cernier, Dombresson and Villiers.
Fribourg	1 February 1949		Operated by TPF. See also Trolleybuses in Fribourg.
Fribourg – Farvagny	4 January 1912	21 May 1932	See also Fribourg–Farvagny trolleybus system.
Geneva	11 September 1942		Operated by TPG. See also Trolleybuses in Geneva.
La Chaux-de-Fonds	23 December 1949		Operated by TRN. See also Trolleybuses in La Chaux-de-Fonds. All service was suspended for almost 12 years, from 2014 to 2026, but most wiring was kept in place, because initially it had not been decided whether the suspension would become a permanent closure. Plans to reopen (with new vehicles) were announced in 2021, but their implementation was delayed several times.
Lausanne	2 October 1932		Operated by TL. See also Trolleybuses in Lausanne.
Lucerne	7 December 1941		Operated by VBL. See also Trolleybuses in Lucerne.
Lugano	25 April 1954	28 June 2001	Operated by ACT. See also Trolleybuses in Lugano.
Montreux–Vevey	18 April 1957		Connects Vevey, Montreux and Villeneuve. Operated by VMCV. See also Trolleybuses in Montreux/Vevey.
Neuchâtel	16 February 1940		System included an interurban line to Cernier (Val-de-Ruz) until 1969. Operated by TN. See also Trolleybuses in Neuchâtel.
St. Gallen	18 July 1950		Operated by VBSG. See also Trolleybuses in St. Gallen.
Schaffhausen	24 September 1966	14 December 2025	Operated by VBSH. See also Trolleybuses in Schaffhausen.
Thun	19 August 1952	13 March 1982	Connected Thun and Beatenbucht. Operated by STI.
Val-de-Ruz – see Cernier			
Vevey – see Montreux–Vevey			
Winterthur	28 December 1938		Operated by Stadtbus Winterthur. See also Trolleybuses in Winterthur.
Zürich	27 May 1939		Operated by VBZ. See also Trolleybuses in Zürich.

== Trolley freight ==
In addition to trolleybus systems, one trolley-freight (or trolleytruck) system existed, on a route between Mühleberg and Gümmenen, from 1918 to 1922. It had just two trolley-truck vehicles and was used during construction of a power station.

== See also ==
- List of trolleybus systems, for all other countries
- List of town tramway systems in Switzerland
- List of light-rail transit systems
- List of rapid transit systems
- Trolleybus usage by country

== Sources ==
=== Books and periodicals ===
- Murray, Alan. 2000. "World Trolleybus Encyclopaedia" (ISBN 0-904235-18-1). Reading, Berkshire, UK: Trolleybooks.
- Dölling, Gerhard (Ed.). 1993. "Strassenbahnatlas Schweiz 1993" (ISBN 3-926524-13-8). Berlin: Arbeitsgemeinschaft Blickpunkt Strassenbahn e.V.
- Peschkes, Robert. 1993. "World Gazetteer of Tram, Trolleybus and Rapid Transit Systems, Part Three: Europe" (ISBN 0-948619-01-5). London: Rapid Transit Publications.
- Trolleybus Magazine (ISSN 0266-7452). National Trolleybus Association (UK). Bimonthly.
- Blickpunkt Strassenbahn (Focus on Tramways). Arbeitsgemeinschaft Blickpunkt Strassenbahn e.V. (Germany). Bimonthly.
