= Trolleybuses in Geneva =

Swiss public transit system

Geneva trolleybus system
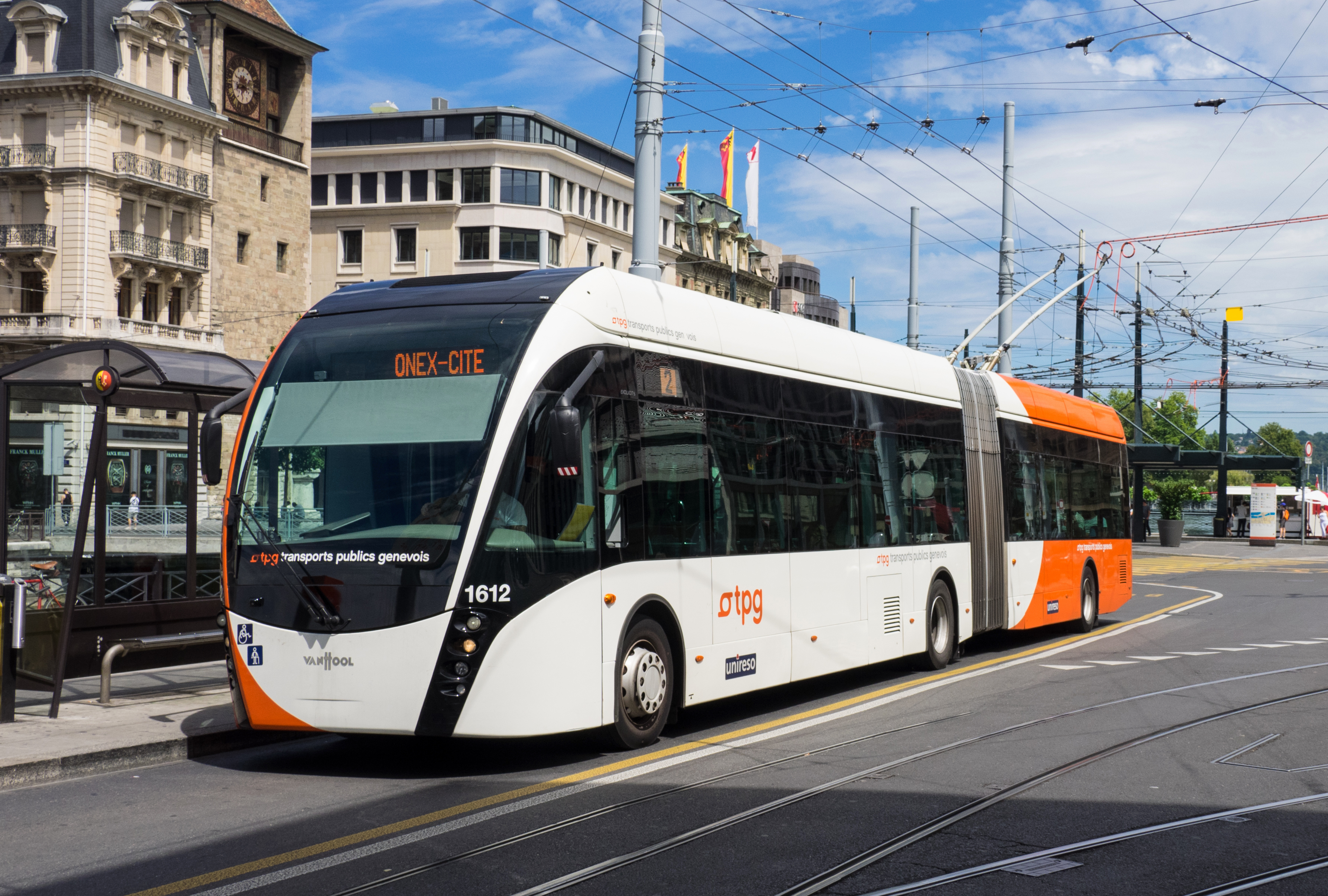
- Van Hool no. 1612 at Place de Bel-Air in 2017

Operation
- Locale: Geneva, Switzerland
- Open: 11 September 1942
- Status: Open
- Routes: 6
- Operator: Transports publics genevois

Infrastructure
- Electrification: 600 V DC
- Stock: 91

Statistics
Overview
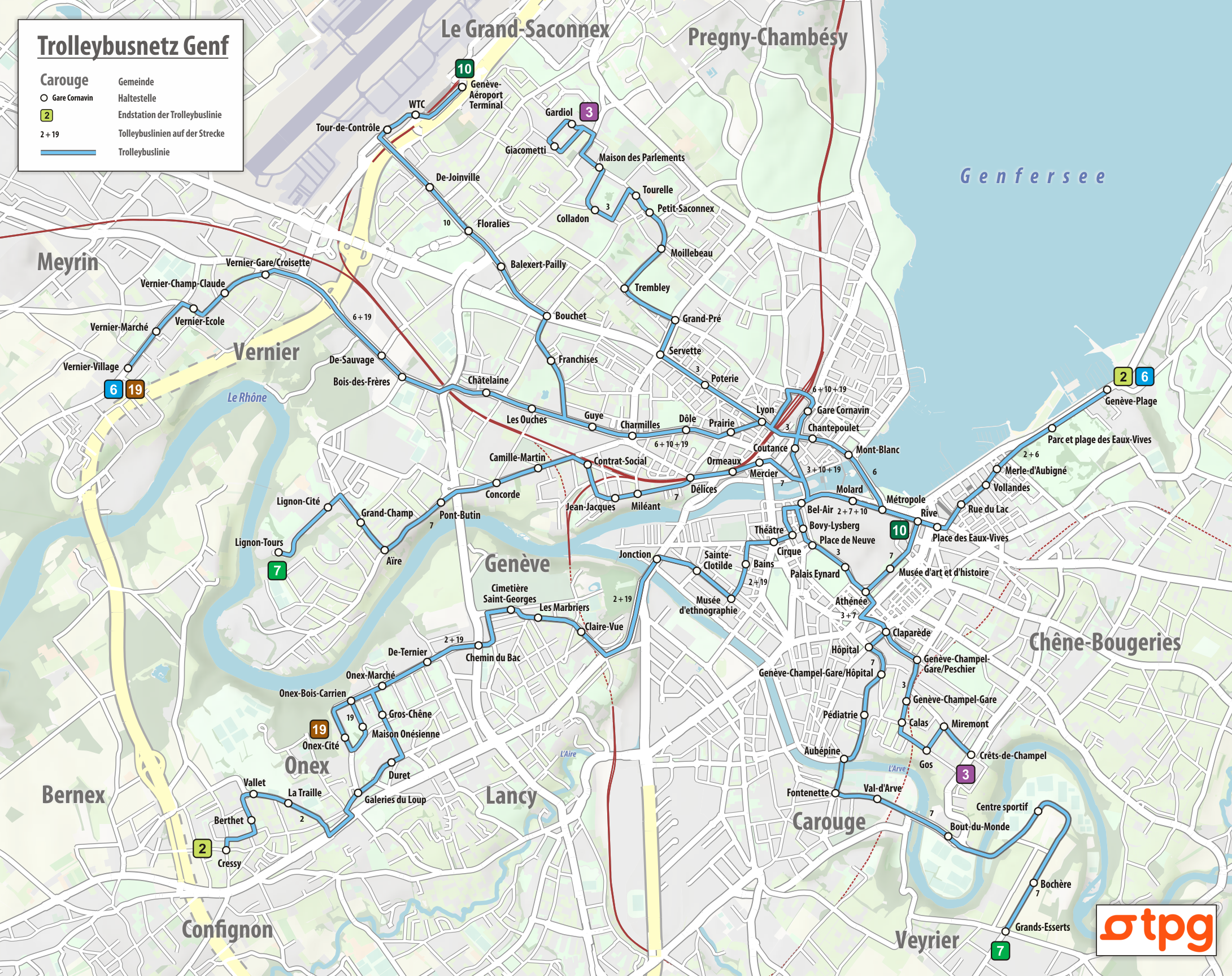
Map of the system (2026)
- Website: http://www.tpg.ch Transports publics genevois (in French)

The Geneva trolleybus system (French: Réseau trolleybus de Genève) forms part of the public transport network in Geneva, Switzerland. It is the second largest trolleybus system in Switzerland, after the Lausanne system.

Opened in 1942, the system supplements the Geneva tramway network. It is operated by Transports publics genevois (TPG), and currently also serves the neighbouring municipalities of Bernex, Cologny, Confignon, Le Grand-Saconnex, Lancy, Meyrin, Onex and Vernier.

== History ==
Geneva's first trolleybus line, inaugurated on 11 September 1942, linked Champel with Le Petit-Saconnex, replacing the former tram line. Like the tramway network, it was operated by the Compagnie Genevoise des Tramways Électriques (CGTE). In subsequent years, other tram lines were closed and replaced with trolleybus lines:

- in 1950, line 4;
- in 1959, line 6;
- in 1961, line 2.

Additionally, two trolleybus lines replaced former bus lines:

- in 1950, line 7 to Aïre;
- in 1959, line 33 to Cointrin.

In 1971, line 4 was closed. On 1 January 1977, the name of the operator, CGTE, was changed to Transports Publics Genevois (TPG). On 25 September 1989, line 5 was merged into line 6. For more than a decade, some services on the extended line 6 were operated by conventional buses (fully trolleybus line 26 was supporting it till Châtelaine), but on 24 June 2001 the line reverted to operation solely by trolleybuses.

== Lines ==
Since the reorganisation of Geneva's tram and trolleybus lines on 11 December 2011, the trolleybus lines have been as follows:

Geneva Public Transport	Genève, Plage – Bernex, Cressy	29 stops
Geneva Public Transport	Grand-Saconnex, Gardiol – Genève, Crêts-de-Champel	25 stops
Geneva Public Transport	Vernier, village – Genève, Plage	25 stops
Geneva Public Transport	Vessy, Grands-Esserts – Vernier, Lignon-Tours	29 stops
Geneva Public Transport	Genève-Aéroport, Terminal – Genève, Rive	19 stops
Geneva Public Transport	Vernier, village – Onex, cité	31 stops

== Fleet ==
=== Current fleet ===
Geneva's present trolleybus fleet consists of 94 articulated and ten bi-articulated vehicles:

Fleet nos.	Quantity	Manufacturer	Electrics	Type	Configuration	Low-floor	Built
731–768	38	Hess	Kiepe	BGT-N2C	Articulated	yes	2004-2005
781–790	10	Hess	Kiepe	BGGT-N2C	Bi-articulated	yes	2005–2006
1601–1656	56	Van Hool	Kiepe	ExquiCity 18	Articulated	yes	2014–2021

=== Past fleet ===
The following table summarises Geneva's former trolleybuses:

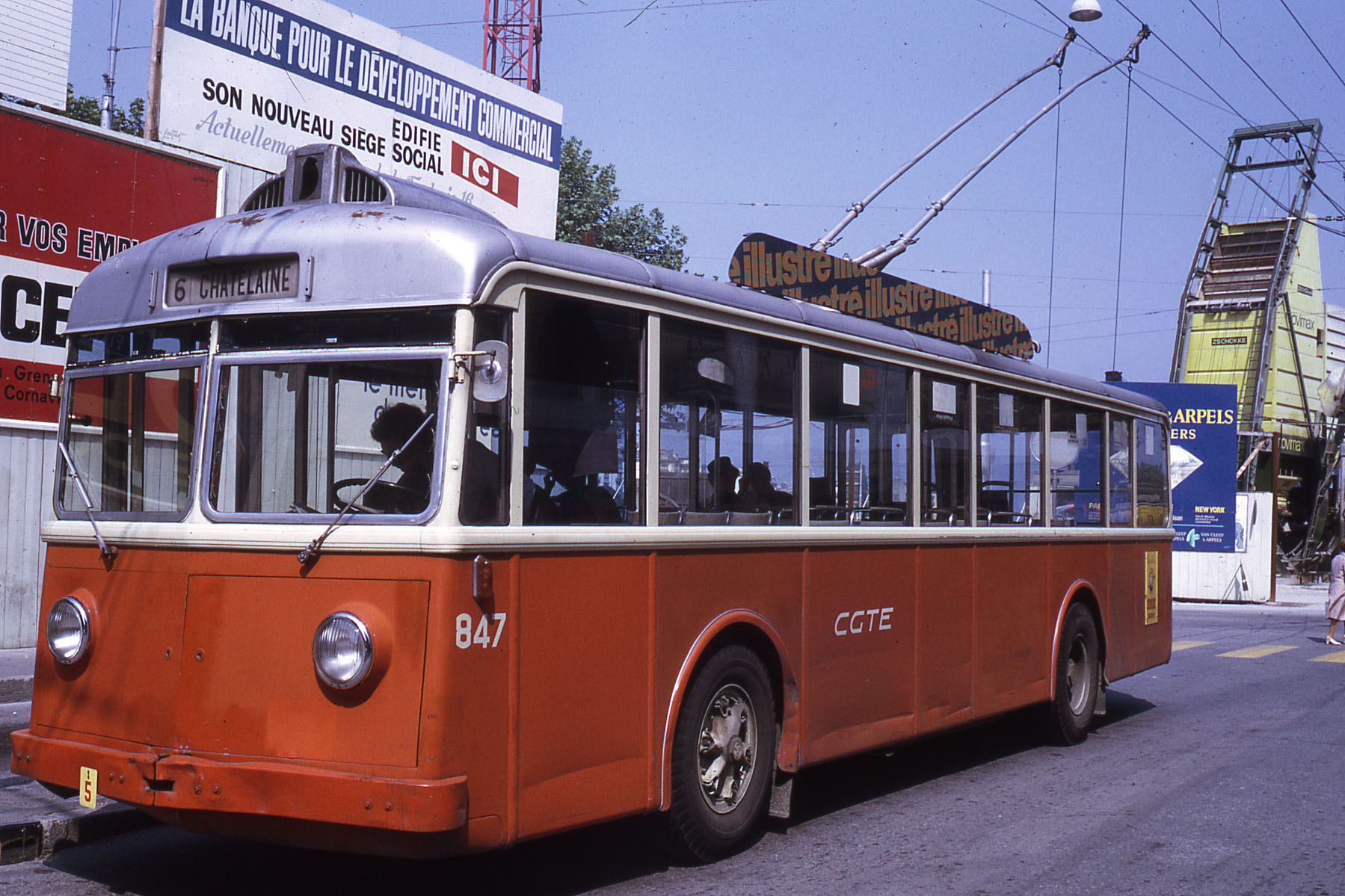
Rigid FBW 51 type vehicle no 847, photographed in 1971

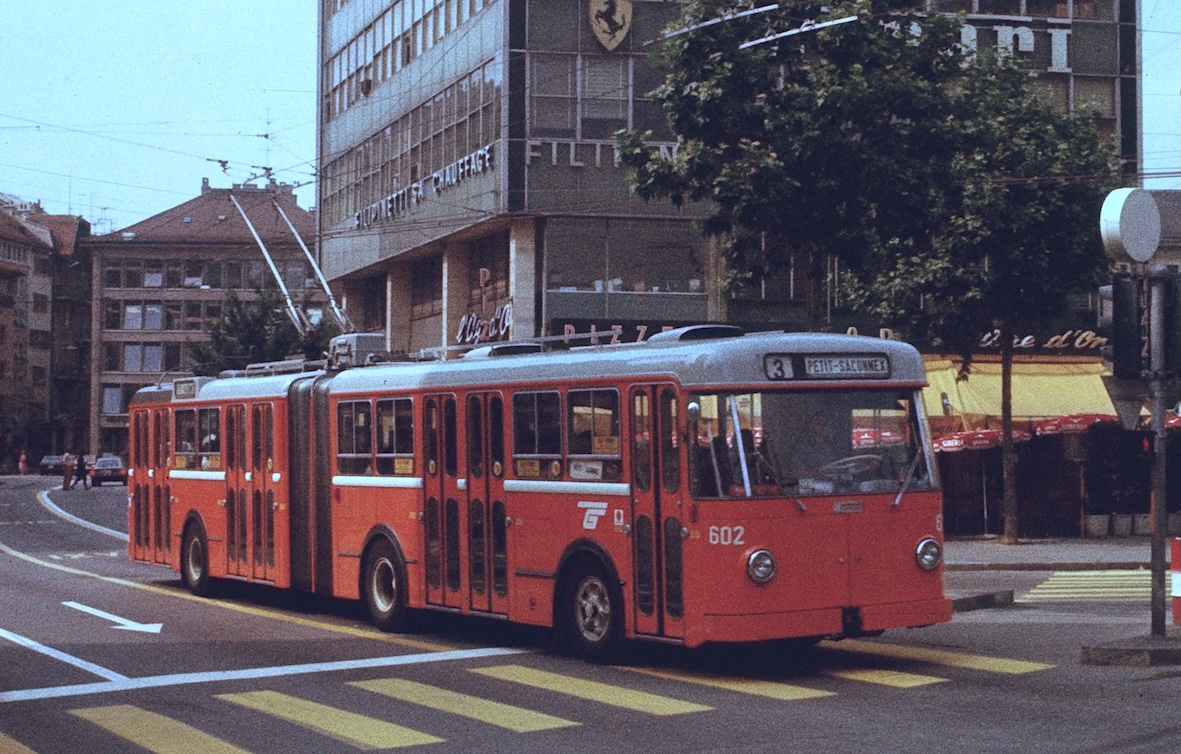
Berna articulated trolleybus 602 in 1979. This was one of several trolleybuses of its type that were sold to the Valparaíso trolleybus system, in Chile, in 1992.

Fleet nos.	Quantity	Manufacturer	Electrics	Type	Built	Out of service
801–812	12	Saurer / CGTE	SAAS	Rigid (two-axle)	1942–48	
821–835	15	Saurer / Hess	SAAS	Rigid (two-axle)	1950–51	
836–846	11	FBW	MFO	Rigid (two-axle)	1947 (ex-VBZ)	
847–856	10	FBW	MFO	Rigid (two-axle)	1949–51 (ex-VBZ)	
861–878	18	Berna / SWP	SAAS	Rigid (two-axle)	1959–60	1988
881–892	12	Berliet	SAAS	Rigid (two-axle)	1963	1975
601–621	21	Berna / SWS	SAAS	Articulated	1965	1992
631–648	18	FBW / Hess	SAAS	Articulated	1975	2005
651–674	24	Saurer / Hess	BBC	Articulated	1982–83	2014
681–700	20	NAW / Hess	BBC	Articulated	1987–88	2014
701–713	13	NAW / Hess	ABB	Articulated	1992–93	2021
721	1	NAW / Hess	ABB	Bi-articulated	1993/2003 (ex-709)	2016

A number of Geneva's former trolleybuses, fleet nos. 32, 96, 602–605, 607, 611–613, 615–617, 621, 643 and 644, were exported to Chile in the early 1990s. Some of these exported vehicles remained in service on the Valparaíso trolleybus system for many more years, the last two being withdrawn in 2013 and 2014.

The unique NAW/Hess bi-articulated vehicle, fleet no. 721, was created in autumn 2003, by adding a third (middle) body section to the 1993-built trolleybus no. 709 of type BGT-N. It was the first Swiss bi-articulated trolleybus and served as a prototype for the production vehicles of type BGGT-N2C. All of the bi-articulated vehicles are used on line 10.

== See also ==
- List of trolleybus systems in Switzerland
- Trams in Geneva
