= Trolleybuses in Valparaíso =

Public transport system in Chile

Coordinates: 33.046167°S 71.604528°W

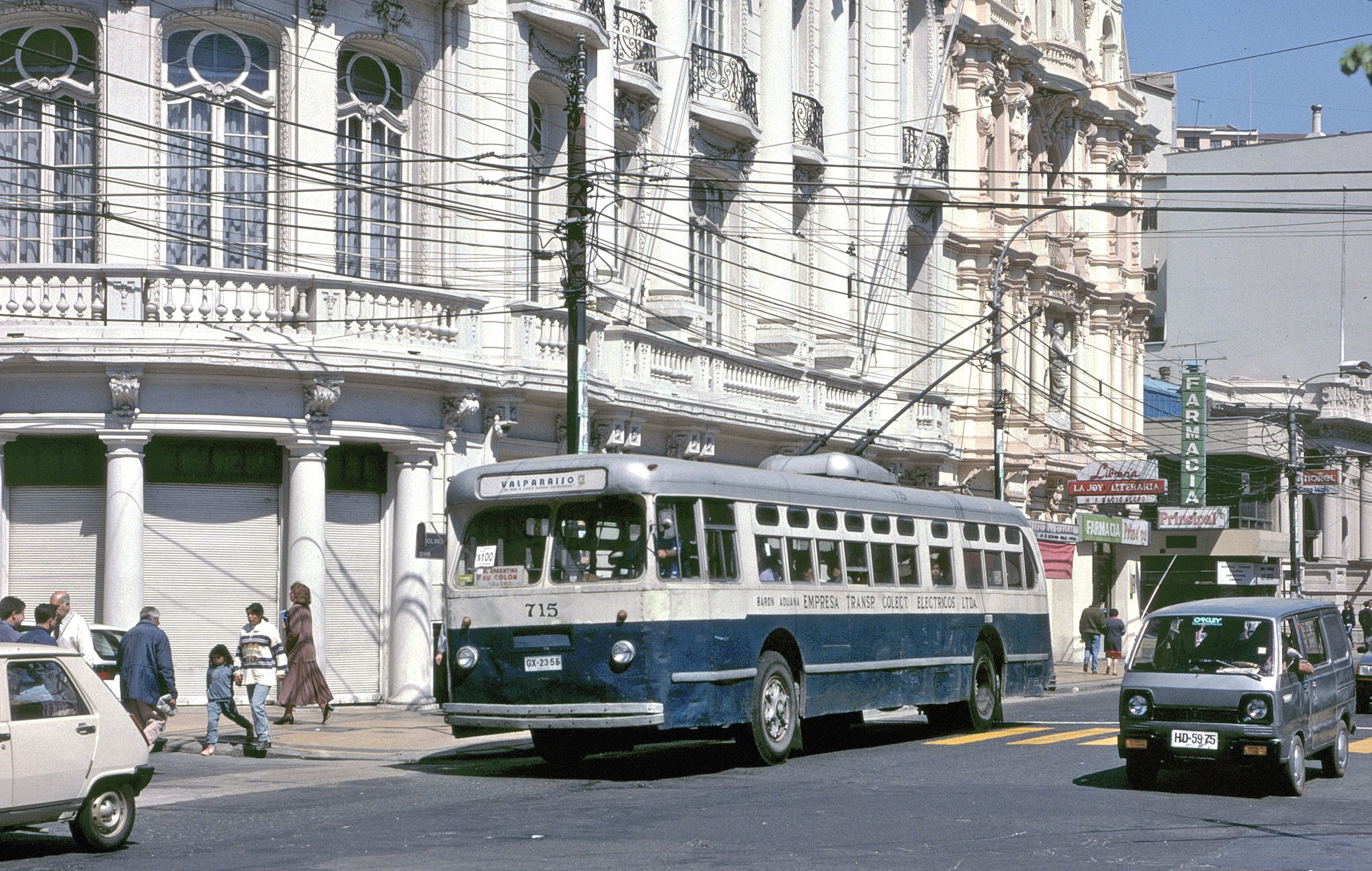
- One of Valparaíso's 1952-built Pullman-Standard trolleybuses in 1996, when still in the system's original paint scheme and with the name of the private operating company, ECTE, along its sides

Overview
- Locale: Valparaíso, Chile
- Transit type: trolleybus
- Number of lines: 2
- Website: Official page on Facebook

Operation
- Began operation: 31 December 1952
- Operators: Since 2007: Trolebuses de Chile, S.A.
- Number of vehicles: 30

Technical
- System length: Approx. 5 km (3 mi)
- Electrification: 500–550 Volts DC

Trolleybuses in Valparaíso, Chile, have provided a portion of the public transit service since 1952. The trolleybus system is the second-oldest in South America. The originally state-owned system has been privately owned since 1982, and since 1994 it has been Chile's only operational trolleybus system. In the 1990s and 2000s, almost half of the fleet continued to be vehicles built in 1946–52 by the Pullman-Standard Company, and by 1999 they were the oldest trolleybuses in regular service anywhere in the world, until the retirement of the last active Pullman trolleybus in March 2023. Those vehicles were collectively declared a national monument by the Chilean government in 2003. They helped the city gain its designation by UNESCO as a World Heritage Site, and have been called "a heritage sight in their own right" by at least one travel writer.

In 1991–1992 the system acquired several secondhand trolleybuses from four Swiss cities. Even these vehicles, already old at the time of acquisition, became historic in their continued service after some 45–50 years or more, with 1959-built ex-Zürich number 105 being the oldest articulated trolleybus of any make still in service on any trolleybus system worldwide for almost 20 years until its retirement in May 2015. In the mid-2010s, a new group of secondhand Swiss trolleybuses, 18 1989-built NAWs from the Lucerne trolleybus system, began to arrive and by 2019 had replaced all of the older Swiss vehicles. By 2023, they made up the entire fleet, replacing the last of the vintage Pullman-Standard trolleybuses.

The Valparaíso trolleybus system has become one of the icons of the city, considered an important part of its cultural heritage. Many porteños – as residents of this port city commonly call themselves – are fond of their city's distinctive and historic trolleybus service and have spoken up in its defense when the system has come under threat of closure. The private operating company receives no government subsidy, and at times it has struggled financially, putting the system in danger of being closed. One such occasion, the company's announcement in May 2007 of imminent closure plans, brought an outcry from local citizens, and even Chile's president, Michelle Bachelet, expressed support for keeping the trolleybuses going.

Trolleybuses currently serve two routes, numbered 801 and 802 in a regional transportation plan implemented in 2007, Monday through Saturday, from about 7 a.m. to 10 p.m. There is no service on Sundays. Both routes connect Barón with Aduana, 801 via Avenida Pedro Montt, 802 via Avenida Colón and each is about 5 km (3 mi) long. The system is currently owned and operated by Trolebuses de Chile, S.A. Locally, the vehicles are often referred to as troles (trolleys), as opposed to trolebuses.

== History to 2007 ==
Trolleybus service was inaugurated on 31 December 1952, as the country's second trolleybus system, after one that had opened in the capital, Santiago, in 1947. The Santiago system closed in 1978, and a second system that opened there in 1991 lasted only until 1994.

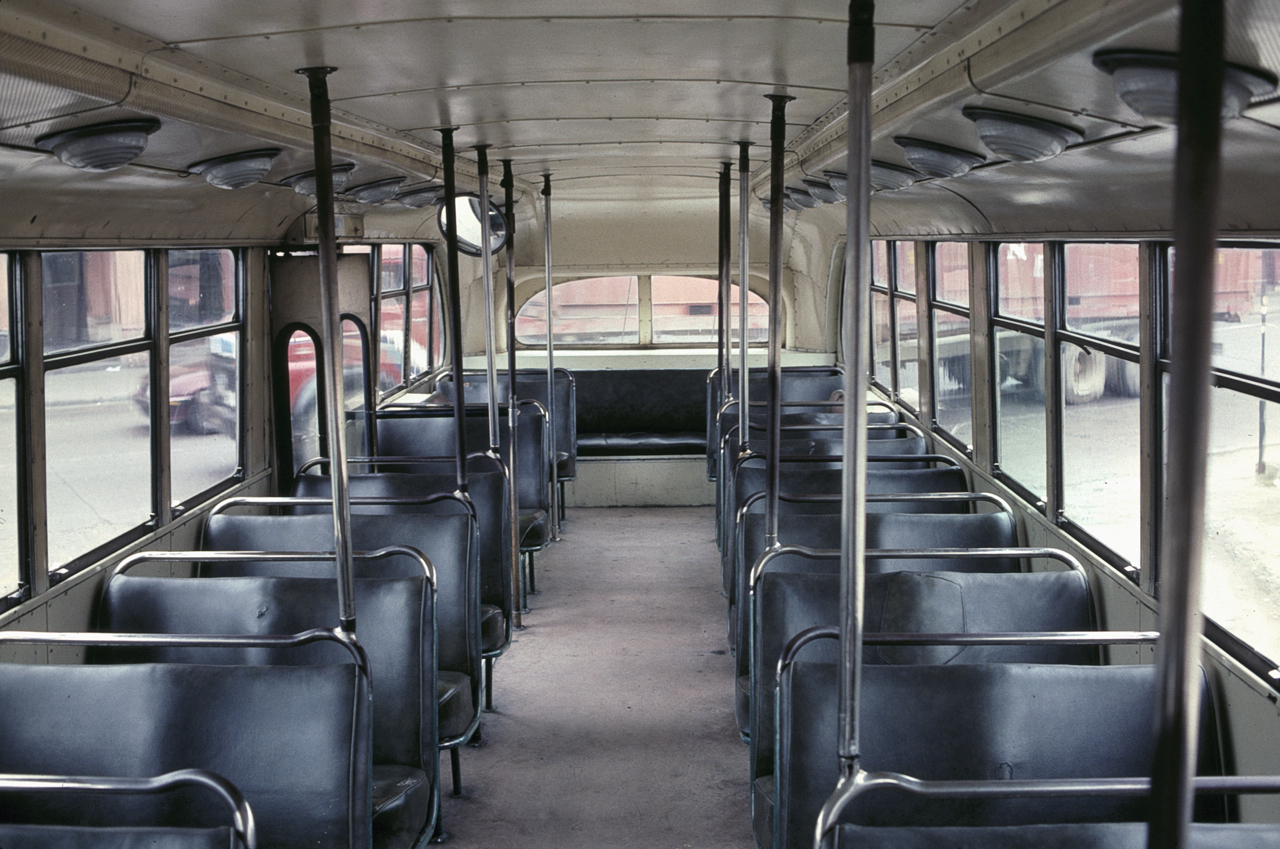
Interior of one of the 1947 Pullman trolleybuses

Trolleybuses replaced Valparaíso's last tram (streetcar) service, which had been introduced in 1863 as a horse-drawn street railway, one of the first in South America, and been converted to electric trams in 1904. The last tram ran on 30 December 1952, and trolleybus service began the following day, on a route connecting Barón with Plaza Victoria. Only eight days later, on 7 January 1953, the route was extended from Plaza Victoria to Aduana. The eastern half of this first Barón–Aduana route followed Avenida Pedro Montt, but a second route connecting the same two termini but following Avenida Colón was introduced in February 1953. The western half of both routes was identical. The Avenida Colón route has remained in operation to the present day.

For many years, the Santiago and Valparaíso trolleybus systems were owned by the national government. Their original operator was the Empresa Nacional de Transportes (ENT), which had taken over the tram systems in both cities in 1945. ENT was reorganized on 2 May 1953 as a new government agency, Empresa de Transportes Colectivos del Estado (ETCE), which then ran the system for the next 28 years. Both cities' systems used vehicles built by the American manufacturer, Pullman-Standard. For Valparaíso, ENT had purchased 30 new trolleybuses from Pullman. Although Pullman – better known for its railway coaches – was a major U.S. builder of trolleybuses, manufacturing more than 2,000 in total, the 30 for Valparaíso were the very last trolleybuses the company ever built. They were built in October and November 1952.

ETCE's Santiago system had a fleet of 100 Pullman trolleybuses (801–900), built in 1946 (the first six), 1947 and 1948, expanded in 1953 by the acquisition of 100 trolleybuses supplied by the French company, Vétra (numbered 901–1000). In 1954, ETCE transferred 39 of the Santiago Pullmans to Valparaíso, for use on a new 10 km (6.2-mile) interurban route to Viña del Mar. Trolleybus service to Viña del Mar was inaugurated on 7 December 1959. However, the interurban service lasted less than five years, having already been abandoned by 1964, leaving trolleybuses in operation only within Valparaíso thereafter.

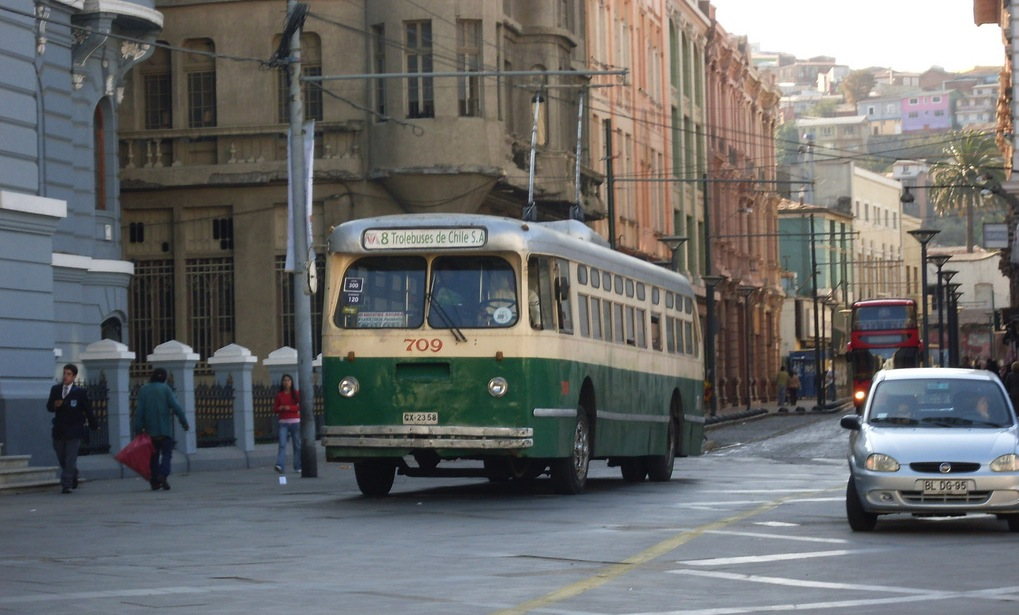
1952 Pullman trolleybus 709 in service in 2008, in the green-and-cream paint scheme adopted in 2003

After the 1973 military coup, the new Pinochet administration reduced funding for government-run public transit, and the two trolleybus systems both deteriorated quickly. ETCE abandoned its Santiago trolleybus system in the latter half of 1978. The Vetra trolleybuses had been less reliable and had all been scrapped by this time, but ETCE transferred its remaining Santiago Pullman trolleybuses to Valparaíso, where some were placed in service and the remainder provided a supply of parts to keep the others running.

The Valparaíso system struggled to maintain its now-elderly vehicles and infrastructure with limited funds, but eventually succumbed, closing on 30 November 1981. However, a group of local businessmen interested in reviving the trolleybus service soon acquired the assets of the now-dissolved Empresa de Transportes del Estado. On 26 April 1982 they formed a new company whose name intentionally used the same initials, Empresa de Transportes Colectivos Eléctricos, Limitada (Electric Public Transport Company, Ltd.) (ETCE, again), and within two weeks had restored the service, using the same vehicles. Service continued to follow two routes, both connecting Barón with Aduana but alternatively via either Avenida Colón or Avenida Pedro Montt. The routes were not numbered.

=== Service changes after 1990 ===
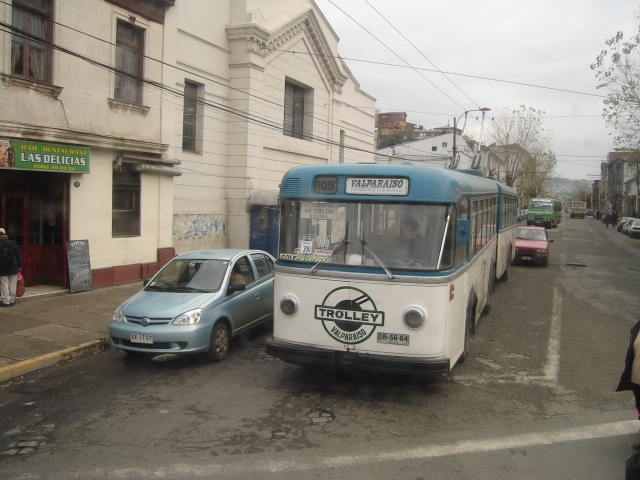
Ex-Zürich 105 (built 1959), the oldest articulated trolleybus still in service anywhere in the world in the 2000s and 2010s, displaying a logo ETCE used from 2003–2007

The Avenida Pedro Montt route was discontinued in 1991, leaving only the Avenida Colón route in service. ETCE tried reinstating the Pedro Montt service twice since then, in October 2002 and January 2007, but withdrew it again just a few months later in both instances, after finding that competing service run by other bus companies along the same street made that corridor a money-loser for ETCE.

A new company named Trolebuses de Chile, S.A. (TCSA) was established in 2000, with 40% ownership by ETCE president Pedro Massai. ETCE remained the system's overall owner and operator, but some of its assets, including the overhead trolley wires, were transferred to the new company. During a three-week suspension of service in August 2002, caused by a drivers' strike, some 20,000 residents signed a petition urging the two sides to reach agreement so that trolleybus service could be restored. The city's largest-circulation newspaper, El Mercurio, also published an editorial in support of restoring and maintaining the trolleybus service.

Trolebuses de Chile, S.A. became the operator of the trolleybus system in early 2007.

=== Paint schemes ===
Although some vehicles wore a red-and-cream paint scheme/livery from the 1970s until 1981, for most of the system's history from its opening in 1952 until 2001 the standard fleet paint scheme was turquoise blue, or greenish-blue, with cream above the waist, and a silver roof. Around the early 1990s, a lighter shade of greenish blue was applied to Pullman trolleybuses that had been rebuilt, replacing the dark turquoise which remained in use on the other Pullmans. Around 2001, this lighter greenish-blue briefly replaced the dark turquoise on most active Pullman trolleybuses not wearing advertising paint schemes, still with beige or cream upper portion. Most of the secondhand Swiss trolleybuses acquired in the 1990s retained their home-system paint schemes, but a few received advertising liveries or an all-over grass green color. Then, in 2003, dark-green-and-cream was adopted as the fleet's new standard paint scheme, although most of the Swiss trolleybuses did not receive it until 2007, when the new Plan de Transporte Metropolitano Valparaíso (TMV) (see below) imposed standardized paint-scheme requirements fleet-wide. The much younger ex-Lucerne trolleybuses that since 2023 have made up the entire fleet still wear the same green-and-cream but with white instead of silver along the roofline.

== Fleet evolution, 1980s to 2000s ==
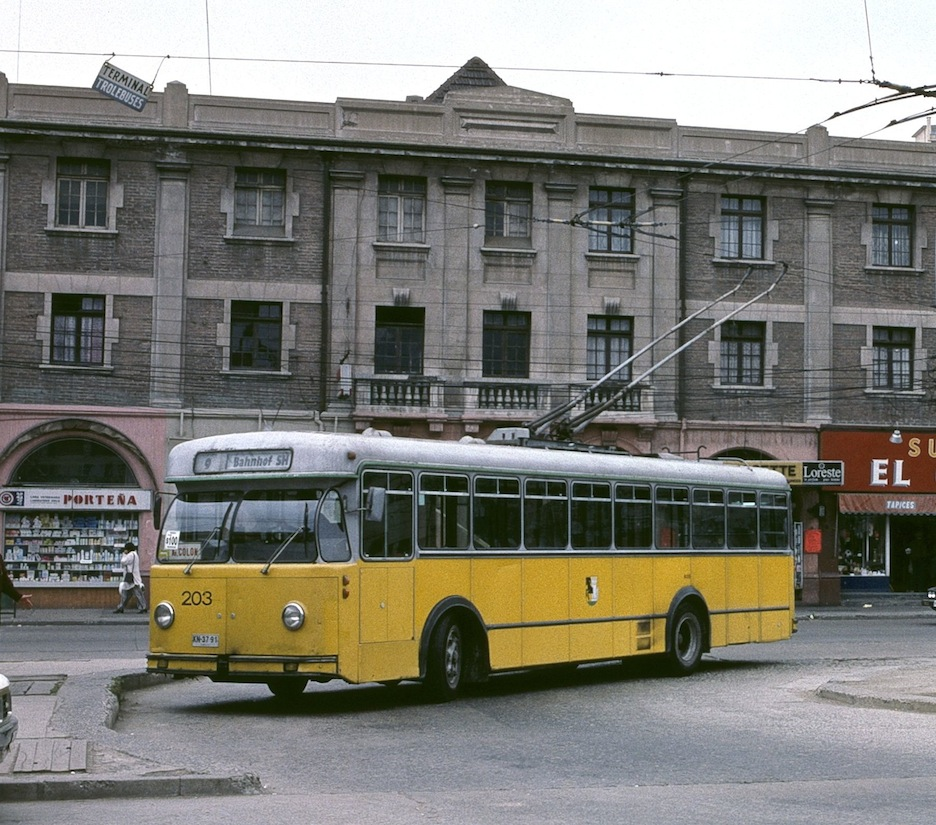
Ex-Schaffhausen trolleybus 203, still in Schaffhausen colors, at Barón terminus in 1996. It operated in Valparaíso from 1992 to 2017.

For nearly 40 years, the fleet comprised solely Pullman-Standard trolleybuses, a combination of new-to-Valparaíso 1952-built Pullmans (the 700-series) and, from 1954 on, a number of ex-Santiago Pullmans, built in 1946–1948 (the 800-series). All had electrical propulsion equipment by General Electric. As of 1986, the total number of trolleybuses available for service was 23–24.

Under a program started in late 1986 and continuing until 1989, ETCE rebuilt the bodies of some of its 800-series vehicles with more modern front ends and, in some cases, sides and backs also. The remaining 700-series vehicles were not rebuilt.

=== Expansion generated by plans for Santiago ===
In 1989 ETCE announced plans to build a new trolleybus system in Santiago. For this purpose and to augment its Valparaíso fleet the company began to acquire trolleybuses secondhand from cities in Switzerland. The vehicles involved were being retired from service and replaced with new trolleybuses on their home systems, but while the vehicles were already 15–30 years old ETCE found this to be a relatively low-cost source of trolleybuses that had been well-maintained. The first such acquisitions were six articulated FBW trolleybuses from Zürich, built in 1959–1964. These arrived in Valparaíso in September 1991 and entered service there later that year.

To operate the new Santiago system, ETCE created a subsidiary named Empresa de Trolebuses Santiago (Santiago Trolleybus Company), or ETS. By the end of 1992 ETCE had acquired no less than 31 secondhand Swiss trolleybuses, of several types and from four cities. From Zürich came one additional, later-model (1974-built) articulated FBW in early 1992; from Geneva, 16 articulated trolleybuses (comprising 14 1965 Berna vehicles and two 1975 FBWs); from St. Gallen five two-axle 1970–1975 Saurer vehicles; and from Schaffhausen three 1966 FBWs, of which two were articulated.

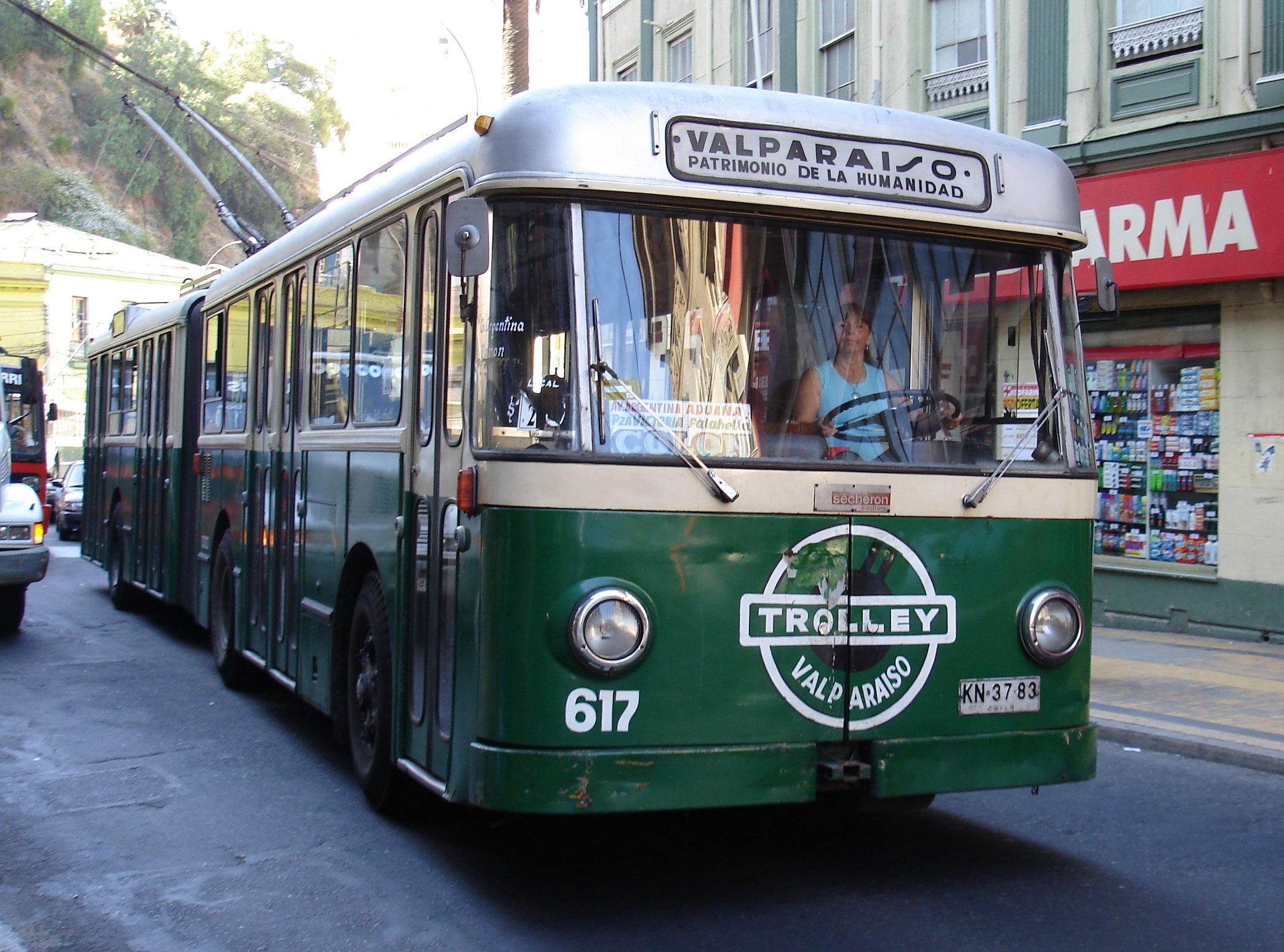
1965-built ex-Geneva articulated trolleybus 617 in 2006

ETCE carried out a program of heavy rebuilding of 18 Pullmans, much more extensive than the earlier rebuildings and effectively a full rebodying, for use exclusively on its new ETS system; these were renumbered into the series 101–118. The Santiago system opened on 24 December 1991, using four ex-Zürich vehicles (renumbered 501–504) and the first few of the rebodied Pullmans. Within two months, these had been joined in Santiago by eight brand-new Chinese "Shenfeng" trolleybuses (601–608) from Norinco, which ETCE/ETS purchased after evaluating a prototype Shenfeng vehicle in Valparaíso in early 1990. China has had several trolleybus manufacturers, and these nine units for ETCE/ETS were notable in being the first Chinese-built trolleybuses ever exported outside of Asia.

=== Sharing between cities ===
Most of the secondhand Swiss vehicles remained in Valparaíso and some entered service there. The three Schaffhausen vehicles all entered service in Valparaíso and never went to Santiago. Three or four of the ex-Geneva vehicles were transferred to the Santiago system for a time, but later returned to Valparaíso. Meanwhile, the Santiago fleet kept its four ex-Zürich and eight Shenfeng vehicles and the 18 heavily rebuilt Pullmans.

The Santiago trolleybus system closed in July 1994. ETS suspended service after operation on 9 July 1994, after months of struggling financially in the face of competition from other private bus companies serving the same areas of Santiago, and ultimately service never resumed. Most of the Santiago fleet remained in storage there, as ETCE/ETS initially hoped to revive the service, until being moved to ETCE's depot (garage) in Valparaíso in early 1996.

=== Post-1995 ===
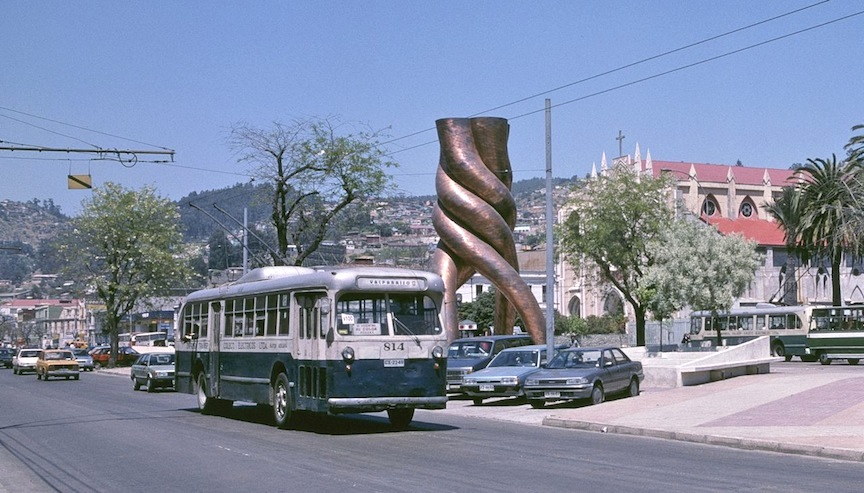
Older-style Pullman trolleybus 814, built in 1947, on Av. Argentina in 1996. This vehicle remained in service until at least 2019 and intermittently in 2021.

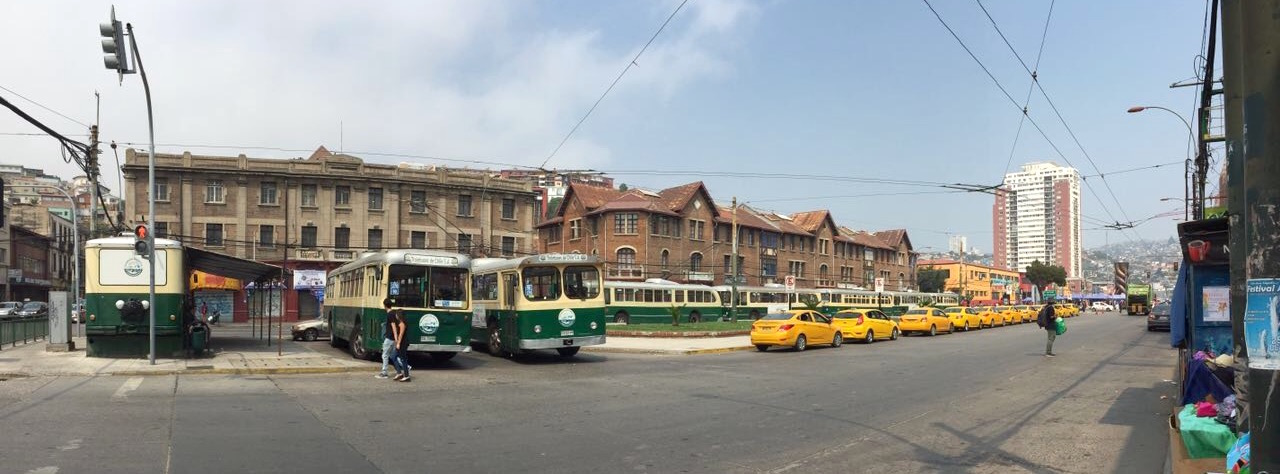
Barón terminus in 2017, with seven Pullman trolleybuses in view and, at the far left, ex-St. Gallen 142 in use as a sales office and a facility for TCSA drivers and supervisors

Most of the ex-ETS fleet remained stored, unused, in Valparaíso for several years and was eventually scrapped. The few Geneva trolleybuses that had run briefly in Santiago entered service in Valparaíso soon after returning. Otherwise, the only ETS-system trolleybuses that entered service in Valparaíso did so only several years later: two of the Zürich vehicles in 2003, one rebuilt Pullman (116) in 2004 and two Shenfengs (603 and 607), in 2004 and 2005, respectively.

The five ex-St. Gallen trolleybuses never performed to ETCE's satisfaction under the low overhead-line voltage in Valparaíso, about 500V–550V as compared with 600 V in St. Gallen, and they were used in service only briefly – most in 1992 only, with one (142) in sporadic use until 1995 or early 1996. They then were stored until being scrapped in 2008, except for No. 142. That sole remaining St. Gallen vehicle was installed at Barón terminus (on Avenida Argentina at Calle Chacabuco) in a semi-permanent arrangement, after being extensively modified inside for use as a sales outlet for tickets and souvenirs and for use by drivers and supervisors.

By 1992 only one of the older (1946–1948) Pullmans remained unrebuilt and still serviceable, 1947-built No. 814. ETCE's longtime president, Pedro Massai, decided to keep No. 814 in original form, due to its appeal as a heritage vehicle, No. 814 having become the oldest unmodernized trolleybus still in normal service anywhere in the world. Pullman 814 was damaged by fire in August 2003, but ETCE repaired it, and the unique vehicle returned to service in December 2003. It remained in regular service until 2019 and intermittently in 2021.

In July 2003, the system's 15 remaining Pullman-Standard trolleybuses, built between 1946 and 1952, were accorded National Historic Monument status by the Chilean government's Consejo de Monumentos Nacionales, the formal decree of this being signed on 26 September 2003. They were already the oldest trolleybuses still in regular service anywhere at that time. Also, Valparaíso had long been the only city in the world where Pullman-built trolleybuses still operated in revenue service, after the last such vehicles in service anywhere else were retired in Seattle in 1978.

=== 2010s: Ex-Lucerne vehicles ===
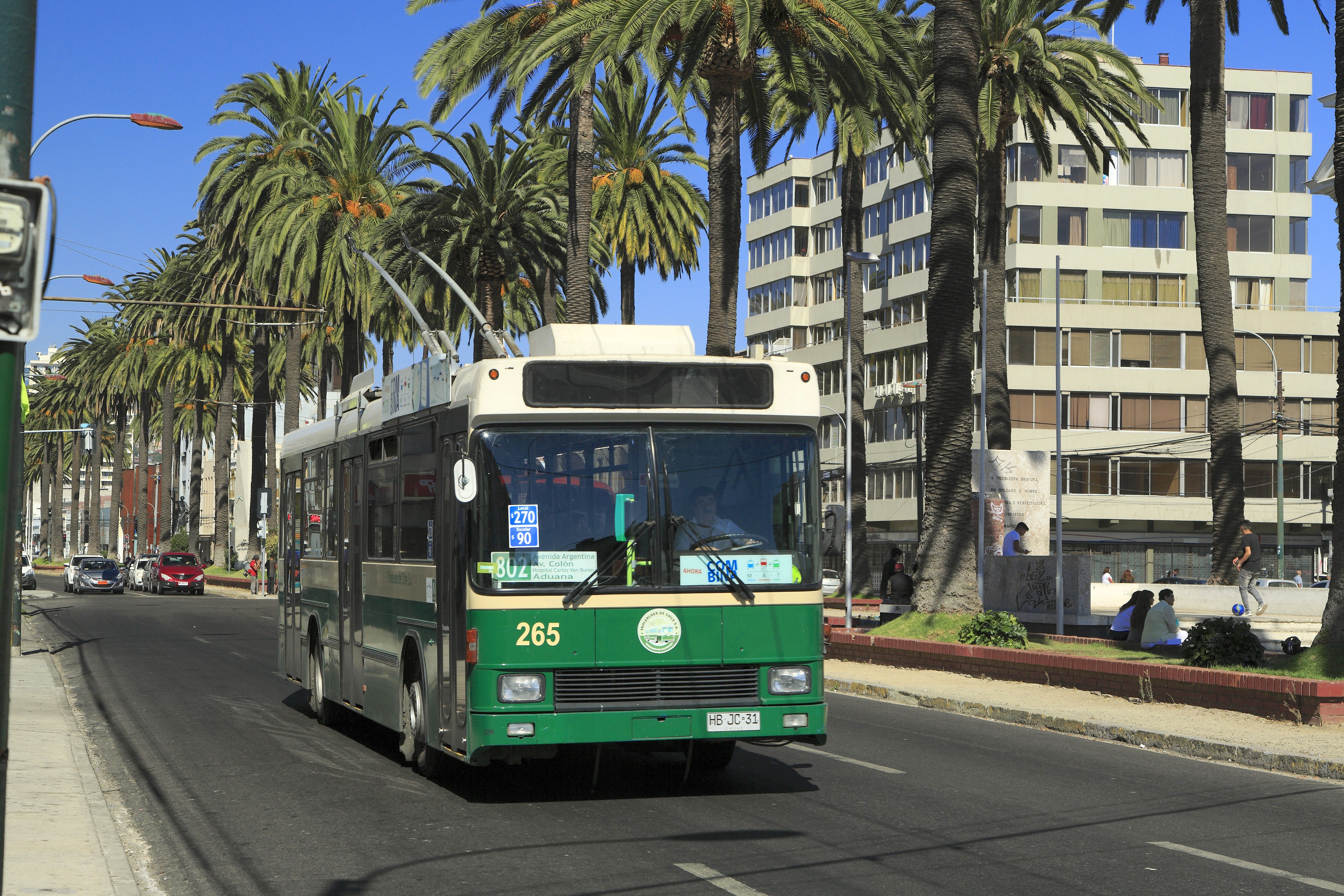
Ex-Lucerne NAW trolleybus 265 in service in 2017

In March 2014, a contract was signed for the acquisition of ten secondhand trolleybuses from Verkehrsbetriebe Luzern, the operator of the Lucerne trolleybus system, in Switzerland, by Trolebuses de Chile SA (TCSA), operator of the Valparaíso trolleybus system since 2007. The vehicles concerned were built in 1989 by NAW, but were still younger than every vehicle in the TCSA fleet but one (a 1991 Shenfeng unit), and much younger than most, as the next-youngest vehicle in the fleet at that time was built in 1966. They are 12-meter, two-axle trolleybuses and were the first trolleybuses acquired by the system since 1992. The first vehicle arrived in Valparaíso on 28 June 2014, followed by the other nine between September 2014 and January 2015.

The start of testing of the vehicles was delayed several months after it was discovered that current traffic regulations prohibited transit vehicles as old as these from operating in passenger service, TCSA's existing fleet having been granted an exemption some years ago. The regulations were amended in early 2015, and testing and training with the ex-Lucerne NAW trolleybuses began in mid-February 2015. They began to enter service on 23 March 2015, and all 10 had entered service by 1 April. TCSA later purchased another eight trolleybuses of the same type from Lucerne. Four arrived in August 2017 and entered service in October 2017, while the final group of four arrived at the end of November 2017 but had not yet entered service as of January 2019, more than a year later. By 2023, the ex-Lucerne NAW vehicles made up the entire Valparaíso trolleybus fleet, the last of the other types having all been withdrawn.

== 2007 improvements, upheaval ==
The trolleybus system underwent several changes in early 2007 in connection with the implementation of a regional public-transportation coordination program called the Plan de Transporte Metropolitano Valparaíso (TMV) by the regional ministry of transportation. TCSA reinstated the former Avenida Pedro Montt route in January, after the ministry granted the company near-exclusive rights to provide transit service in that corridor. The company's now-two routes became numbered 801 (via Av. Pedro Montt) and 802 (via Av. Colón), under the TMV plan, which assigned route numbers to all bus and minibus routes in the region; previously, they had been unnumbered. Both routes continued to terminate at Aduana and Barón. The TMV also required that operators apply a uniform paint scheme to their vehicles, with different colors for different Unidades de negocios (business units). TCSA's routes were the sole routes in Unidad 8, and the company was required to repaint all of its trolleybuses into a common livery of green-and-cream, which was completed in April 2007. Until then, some of the secondhand Swiss trolleybuses (acquired 15–16 years earlier) had retained the paint schemes of their cities of origin, while others, and some Pullmans, had been wearing advertising liveries; the latter were also no longer allowed under the TMV. The company also introduced Sunday service (on both routes), for the first time in the history of private operation, and perhaps the system's history, starting on 6 January 2007.

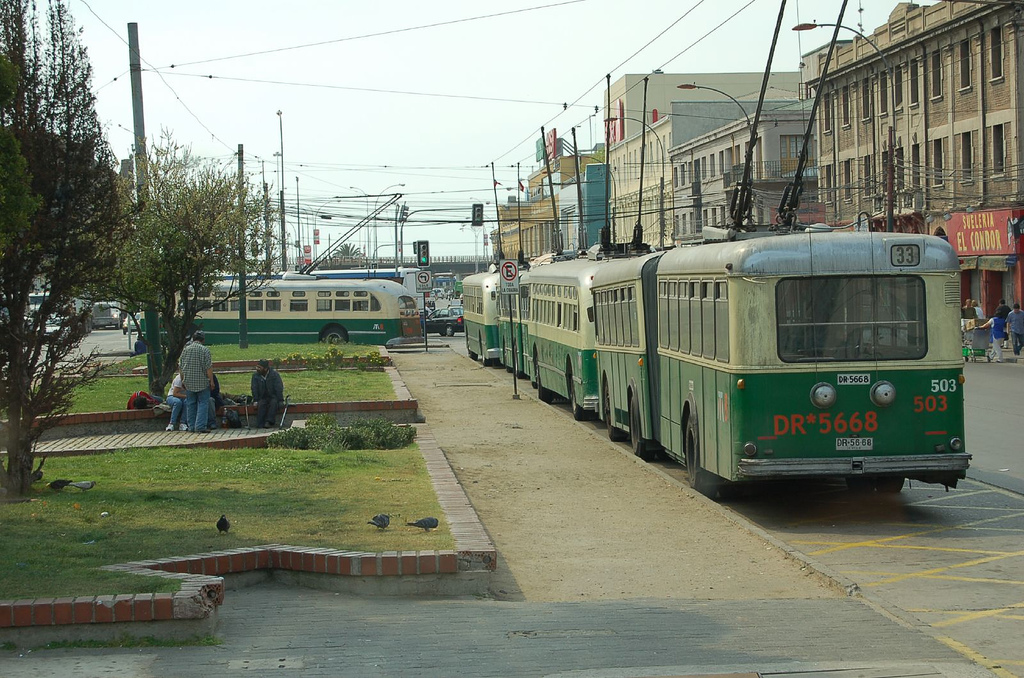
Trolleybuses lined up at Barón terminus, all now in a uniform livery, in 2007. Closest is No. 503, ex-Zürich 129.

TCSA initially reported an increase of at least 30% in its revenue following the reorganization, thanks to its near-monopoly on serving busy Avenida Pedro Montt. However, the situation turned around quickly after complaints from merchants along the street convinced the transportation ministry to permit the return to Avenida Montt of 16 bus routes run by other companies only three weeks later. The trolleybus company's revenue dropped sharply, and it discontinued Sunday service in April 2007. Faced with this unexpected loss of revenue at the same time that it had just incurred the expenses of having to repaint its fleet (to meet the TMV requirements) and expand service (to a second route), the company announced in May that the trolleybus system would close in mid-June. The unexpected news upset many citizens, as the vintage trolleybuses, designated a national historic monument in 2003, had become a cherished local icon. Even Chilean president Michelle Bachelet voiced her support, telling regional transportation minister René Cortázar, "The trolleys can't stop running in Valparaíso", while at a luncheon with Valparaíso's mayor. Negotiations between TCSA and government officials led to agreements that averted the planned closure. Service continued relatively unchanged on the system's longtime Avenida Colón route (802), but the recently revived Avenida Pedro Montt service (route 801) was discontinued once again, on or around 1 September 2007. (It was restored to operation in 2021; see below.)

On 31 October 2007, the historic monument designation given earlier to the Pullman-Standard trolleybuses was expanded to include most of the system's infrastructure, such as overhead wires, support poles and substations.

== 2010s to present ==
TCSA introduced a summer-only city-tour service in January 2010, using one of its historic 1948-built Pullman-built trolleybuses. This operated in January and February 2010, and it returned for a second season in summer 2011 (January 2011). The trolleybus system did not incur any major damage in the 2010 earthquake. Service was suspended for two days, while all of the route's infrastructure was inspected for possible damage. By 2019, newly acquired ex-Lucerne trolleybuses had replaced all of the fleet's older Swiss trolleybuses, and Pullman-Standard trolleybuses built between 1946 and 1952 accounted for only nine of the 23 active vehicles.

=== 2020s ===
In 2020, the COVID-19 pandemic brought a sharp drop in ridership, of around 80–90 percent, and TCSA was forced to make deep service reductions. All of the few remaining active Pullman trolleybuses were taken out of service by May 2020, and none returned to service until March 2021.

On 4 May 2021, route 801 (Avenida Pedro Montt) was restored to operation after an absence of almost 14 years. As of 2022, service was scheduled to run from 8:00 a.m. to 8:00 p.m. on Mondays to Fridays, with 10 trolleybuses, and 8:30 to 6:00 on Saturdays, with eight vehicles. The peak vehicle turnout was intended to be 16, but a shorage of drivers was limiting actual peak usage to 10 vehicles. The last active Pullman trolleybus was retired in March 2023.

== Fleet after 2010 ==
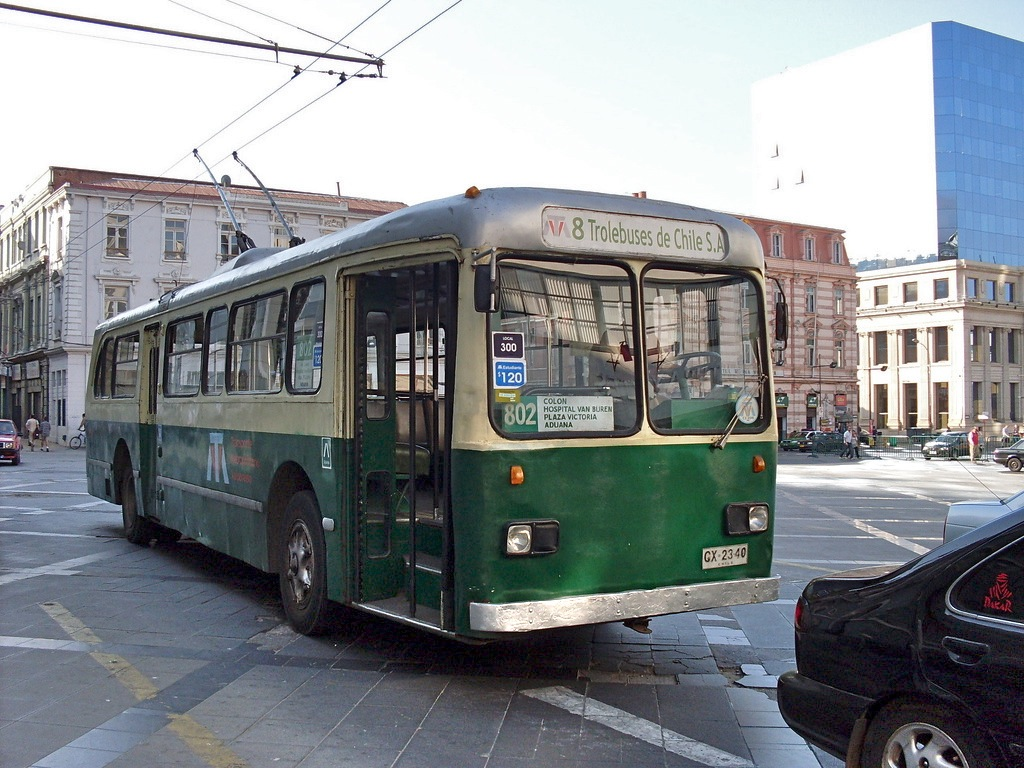
1948 Pullman trolleybus rebuilt circa 1988 with new front and side windows

As of July 2010, the serviceable fleet included 23 trolleybuses. In January 2019 the number was unchanged, but with 18 newly acquired ex-Lucerne trolleybuses having replaced all of the fleet's older Swiss trolleybuses. Pullman-Standard trolleybuses built between 1946 and 1952 still made up more than half of the active (in service) fleet in 2015, but by 2019 they accounted for only nine of the 23 active vehicles, and only two or three returned to service in 2021 after all Pullmans were temporarily withdrawn in the first months of the COVID-19 pandemic. In 2022, it was reported that all Pullman-Standard trolleybuses were stored out of service and only the ex-Lucerne NAW vehicles were in operation. Other sources indicated that one or two Pullmans continued to be used in service from time to time. However, the last active Pullman trolleybus, No. 859, was withdrawn after operation on 8 March 2023.

Table 1 – The Pullman-Standard vehicles (ones active in 2010 or later)
Fleet numbers^{†}	Manufacturer	Year built	Year rebuilt	Notes
116	Pullman	1947	1991	Ex-Santiago 820. Renumbered 116 in 1991, when rebodied for second Santiago system (ETS)
709, 714, 715, 721, 723	Pullman	1952	n/a	Vehicles built new for Valparaíso and still retaining their original bodies. No. 714 received modernized electrical equipment in 2010–11, but was taken out of service in late 2011 and retired in 2015.
814	Pullman	1947	n/a	Ex-Santiago 814. Retaining its original, unmodernized body. Was out of service in 2015–16, but returned to service August 2016 after an overhaul of its mechanical and electrical equipment.
801, 806, 821, 859	Pullman	1946–48	(1987–89)	Ex-Santiago. Rebuilt on all four sides but not rebodied
802, 832, 888	Pullman	1946–48	(1988–89)	Ex-Santiago. Rebuilt on front end only

Notes:
n/a = not applicable (vehicles not rebuilt, still in original form); "ex-Santiago" in this table refers to the 1947–78 trolleybus system there.
†: Bold typeface indicates a vehicle active (in service) as of January 2019.

Table 2 – The Swiss and Chinese vehicles (ones active in 2008 or later)
Fleet numbers^{†}	Manufacturer	Year built	Arrival in Chile	Type	Date withdrawn from service, if applicable	Former identity
105	FBW	1959	1991	articulated	May 2015	Ex-Zürich 105
503	FBW	1963	1991	articulated	Dec. 2016	Ex-Zürich 129
504	FBW	1964	1991	articulated	Feb. 2012	Ex-Zürich 132
99, 612, 617	Berna	1965	1992	articulated	2013–15	Ex-Geneva 99 (ex-607), 612, 617
102	Berna	1966	1992	articulated	late 2009	Ex-Schaffhausen 102
203	Berna	1966	1992	two-axle	May 2017	Ex-Schaffhausen 203
603	Shenfeng	1991	1991	two-axle	2014	Was used as Santiago (ETS) 603 in 1991–1994
607	Shenfeng	1991	1991	two-axle	October 2016	Was used as Santiago (ETS) 607 in 1991–1994
252, 260, 261, 262, 263, 264, 265, 266, 268–270, 272–276, 278, 279	NAW	1989	2014–17	two-axle	in service	Ex-Lucerne, same numbers

Note †: Bold typeface indicates a vehicle active (in service) as of January 2019.

Of the last three active ex-Geneva trolleybuses, No. 612 was retired after sustaining major damage when it crashed into a building in November 2010, and it was scrapped in 2012, and as late 2014 Nos. 617 and 099 had been out of service since mid-2013 and March 2014, respectively, with problems with their compressors and suspension. Ex-Zurich FBW No. 504 was retired after being heavily damaged by fire in February 2012. After the 10 ex-Lucerne NAW trolleybuses entered service, in 2015, the indefinite withdrawals of the last two Geneva vehicles (617 and 099) became permanent, and Shenfeng trolleybuses 603 and 607 were also retired. Shenfeng 607 returned to service in December 2015, but was retired again in October 2016. Ex-Schaffhausen 203, the last of the older generation of secondhand Swiss trolleybuses, from the 1960s, was finally retired in May 2017.

== Maintenance facilities ==
During the efforts to resolve the mid-2007 crisis officials pledged to help TCSA find a better site and facilities for its garage. Until 2000, the trolleybus fleet had been housed and maintained at the city's former tram depot (carhouse), opened in 1904 for trams. However, the property was municipally owned, and in 2000 the city sold it, for planned redevelopment. The trolleybus system's then-owner ETCE was obliged to find other accommodation for its fleet. It was unable to find any suitable enclosed facility that was available near its route, and consequently for several years the trolleybuses were mostly parked on city streets when not in use (including overnight), and all maintenance work had to be done outdoors. In mid-2008, TCSA began leasing a building located only 90 m (300 ft) from its route, for use as its new depot. For the first time in eight years, it became possible to house most of the trolleybus fleet indoors at night and to have indoor maintenance facilities.

== See also ==
- Funicular railways of Valparaíso
- Valparaíso Metro
