= Trolleybuses in Lausanne =

Transit system in Lausanne, Switzerland

Lausanne trolleybus system
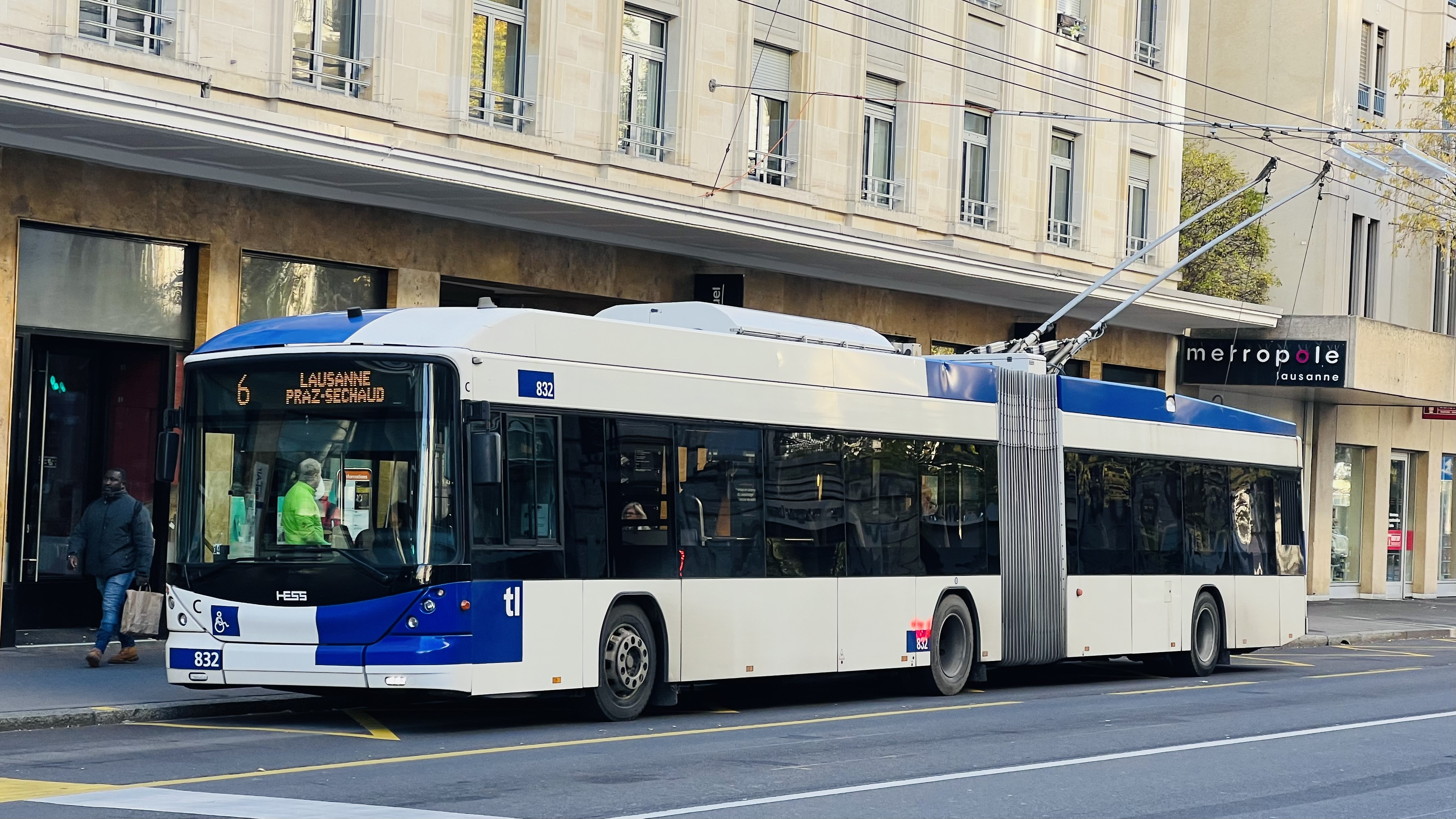
- A Hess SwissTrolley on route 6 in 2023

Operation
- Locale: Lausanne, Switzerland
- Open: 2 October 1932
- Status: Open
- Routes: 12
- Operator: Transports publics de la région lausannoise (TL)

Infrastructure
- Electrification: 600 V DC

Statistics
Overview
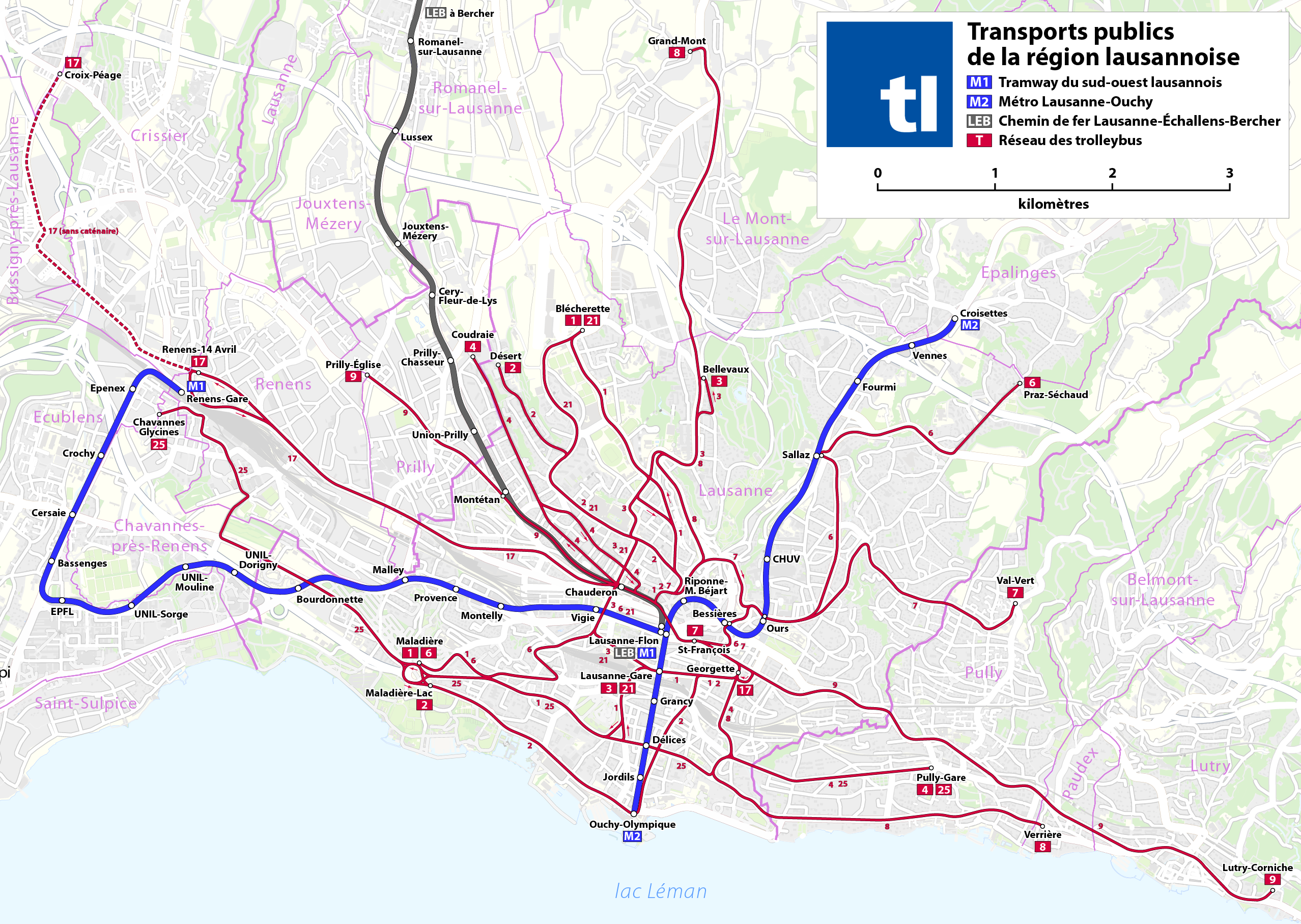
- Website: http://www.t-l.ch Transports publics de la région lausannoise (TL) (in French)

The Lausanne trolleybus system (French: Réseau de trolleybus de Lausanne) forms part of the public transport network of Lausanne, in the canton of Vaud, Switzerland. The system has been in operation since 1932 and is the third-oldest trolleybus system in the world, after those of Shanghai and Philadelphia.

Lausanne is a very hilly city, making trolleybuses well-suited to it as a transport mode. Today, the system is the largest in Switzerland. It is supplemented by the Lausanne Metro, and by various conventional bus routes.

The system is operated by Transports publics de la région lausannoise (TL) – formerly Tramways Lausannois – and comprises 12 trolleybus routes, serving not only Lausanne, but also the neighbouring municipalities of Le Mont-sur-Lausanne, Lutry, Paudex, Prilly, Pully and Renens. Following some line closures, the system no longer serves Cugy, Epalinges and Froideville.

== History ==
Opened on 2 October 1932, the Lausanne system was only the second trolleybus system to open in Switzerland, preceded by the rural Fribourg–Farvagny trolleybus system. That line closed earlier in 1932. The Lausanne system was therefore the country's only trolleybus system at the time of its opening, and it retained that distinction until the opening of the Winterthur trolleybus system, in 1938. It has always been operated by TL, which stood for Tramways Lausannois until 1963 and was changed at that time to the present name, Transports publics de la région lausannoise.

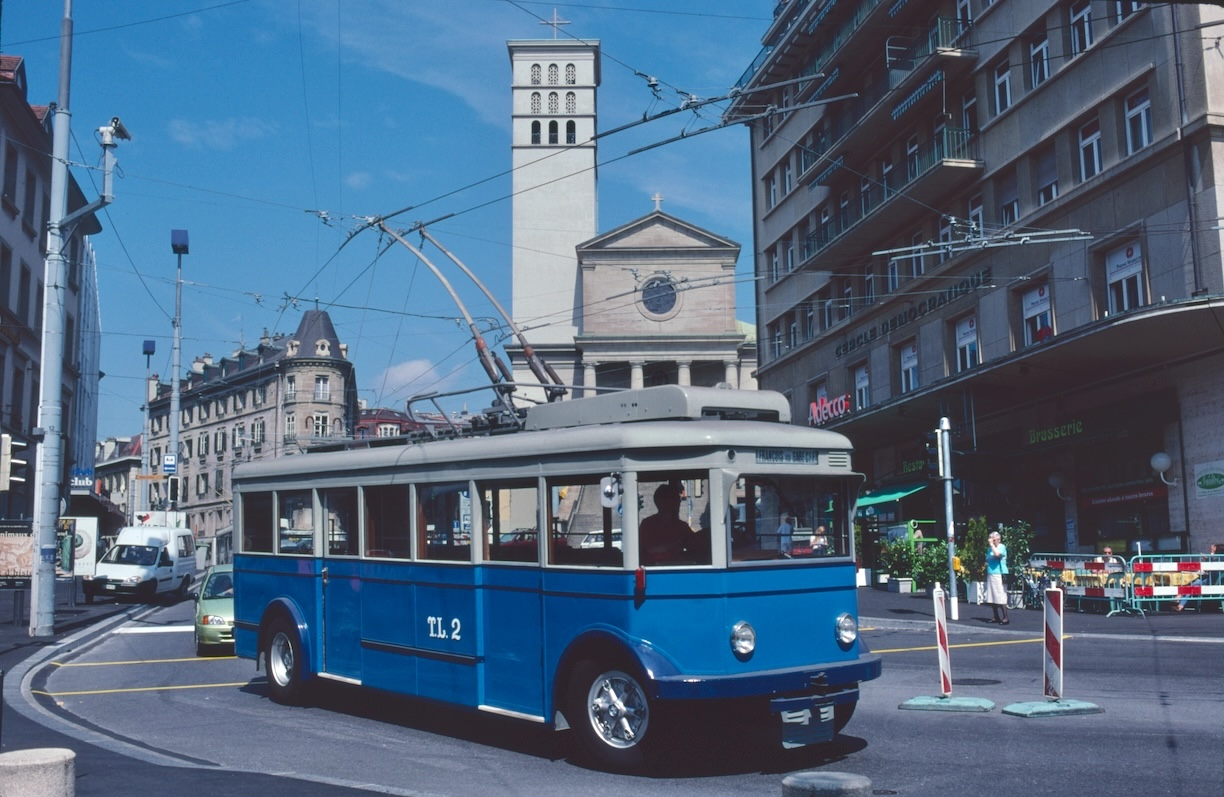
One of Lausanne's first trolleybuses, built in 1932, has been preserved. It is pictured in the city centre in 2000.

The Lausanne system's first line was between Lausanne railway station (Gare CFF) and Ouchy. In 1938–1939, a number of additional lines were opened, and between 1938 and 1964 the system gradually replaced the Lausanne tramway network.

On 9 April 1951, the interurban tram line to Montheron was replaced by trolleybus route 20. On 7 January 1964, trolleybus route 7 replaced tram line 9 (the city's last urban tram line at the time), which had been closed the previous day. By that year, there were 10 trolleybus routes in Lausanne.

On 1 June 1969, a second interurban trolleybus line was launched, to Le Chalet-à-Gobet, as route 21. However, by 1974, this service had only four trips per day, and in 1981 just three per day in the public timetable. On 3 June 1973, new trolleybus route 5 was introduced, running from Avenue Jomini to the surburb of Épalinges (using existing wiring of route 21 for much of its length), and on 1 June 1975, an extension of route 9 was opened between Pully and Lutry.

In 1987, route 7 was extended from La Rosiaz to Val Vert. Trolleybus operation on interurban route 21 had ceased by 1986 or 1987. In connection with the planned 1991 opening of the city's new tramway, the TSOL (Tramway du sud-ouest lausannois, rebranded as Metro Line M1 in 2000), some expansion of the trolleybus system was undertaken. An extension was built to Bourdonnette, and route 2 was extended to there from Bellevire on 1 June 1991. The following day, motorbus route 15 was converted to trolleybuses.

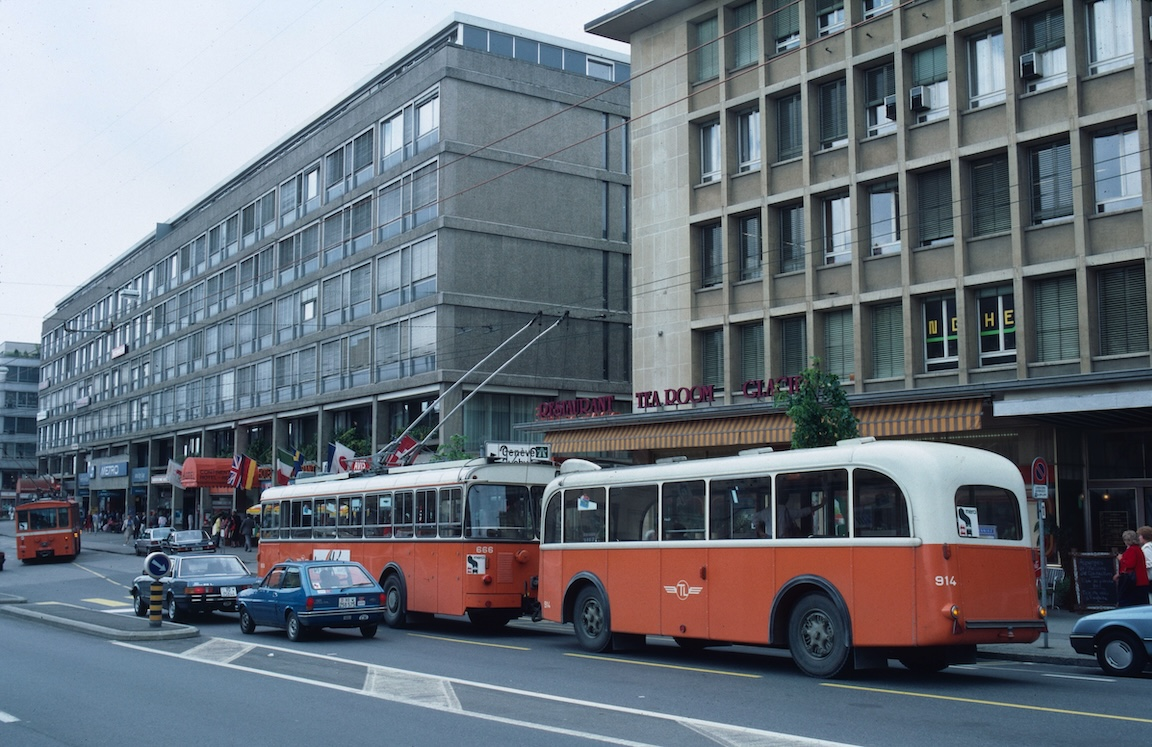
The Lausanne system used passenger trailers on some of its routes for many years, and was the world's last trolleybus system to use trailers. A trolleybus and trailer set is pictured on former route 5 in 1985.

In 1991, interurban route 20 – which by this time was one of the few interurban trolleybus lines remaining in Europe – was renumbered 60. Trolleybuses last served the semi-rural section to Montheron in spring 1993, when a fire destroyed some feeder cable and all service on route 60 was temporarily converted to motorbuses. Limited trolleybus service (a few trips per day) was reintroduced as far as the short-working terminus at Cugy in October 1995, but was discontinued again, permanently, at the end of service on 31 May 1996. A 3-km suburban section of former route 60 regained trolleybus service in December 2011, when route 8 was extended from Bellevaux to Grand Mont after overhead wiring that had been removed in 2000 was reinstalled.

In connection with the opening of metro line 2, in December 2008, route 5 (Place Tunnel – Epalinges) was withdrawn, but two new trolleybus routes were introduced: Route 25 used trolleybuses from the start, but the introduction of trolleybuses on route 21 (unrelated to the former interurban route 21) was delayed by construction until November 2009.

In June 2013, a new trolleybus route 17 (Georgette – Renens) replaced the western half of route 7, with the latter becoming Val-Vert – St. François. An extension of the wiring of route 25 from Bourdonnette to Renens-Gare was constructed in 2013–2014, and the route extension opened on 15 September 2014.

In August 2022, trolleybuses were introduced on new route 20 (Blécherette – Lausanne Gare via Avenue Mont Blanc), which had been created as a new route in January but had been temporarily motorbus-operated initially. In December 2022, route 7 was revised to make its western terminus at Prilly (Galicien/arena) instead of St. François. TL began making use of more-powerful batteries in its newest trolleybuses to add some new route sections that are not equipped with overhead wires, and which trolleybuses cover on battery power only. The first such section to be part of the regular route was an diversion of the eastern part of route 4 from Pully-Gare to terminate at Faverges, implemented in December 2022, which partly uses the wiring of route 9 but traverses the Faverges loop on battery power. On 21 August 2023, route 1 was extended beyond La Maladière to EPFL (École Polytechnique Fédérale de Lausanne), Route de Collardon, and most of the new section is not equipped with wiring.

== Lines ==
Network diagram (2026)

Today, the network has 12 lines:

1	École Polytechnique Fédérale de Lausanne – St-François – Blécherette
2	Maladière-Lac – Ouchy – St-François – Désert
3	Lausanne-Gare CFF – Maillefer
4	Faverges – St-François – Chauderon – Coudraie
6	Maladière– Chauderon – St-François – Sallaz - Praz-Séchaud
7	Val-Vert – Prilly-Galicien (trolleybus sur cette ligne dès le 2ème semestre de 2026)
8	Pully-Gare – St-François – Bellevaux – Grand-Mont
9	Lutry-Corniche – Pully – St-François – Renens VD, Temple de Broye - Crissier, Place centrale (dès le 17 Août 2026)
20	Lausanne-Gare CFF – Blécherette
21	Paudex-Verrière – Blécherette
25	Glycines – Renens Gare – Maladière – Montchoisi – Pully-Gare

Since December 2009, line 8 has operated via Bellevaux to Grand-Mont, but the TL began the 3.3 km (2.1 mi) long extension of the overhead wire only in early 2011. Until completion of the extension in December 2011, every second service on this line was operated by articulated conventional buses - the extension was initially operated only every 20 minutes.

Some of the catenary masts used in constructing the extension of line 8 were recycled masts from the former interurban line 20 to Montheron. This line was powered by electricity until 1993; the catenary was dismantled in 1998.

== Fleet ==
=== History ===
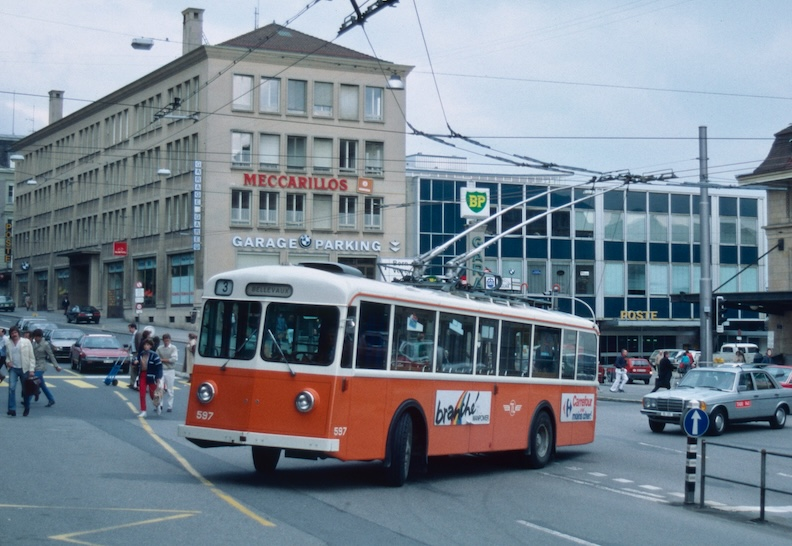
Lausanne acquired many trolleybuses second-hand from other cities. No. 597 (built in 1948) operated in both Zurich and Geneva before being acquired by TL in 1975.

Upon its opening in 1932, the Lausanne system had just three trolleybuses, one manufactured entirely by Saurer and the other two by FBW / SWS and fitted with electrical equipment by BBC. They were withdrawn from service in 1964, but two were rebuilt for use as de-icing vehicles (to scrape ice from the overhead wires in winter), and remained in the fleet for several more years. (One was preserved, and in 1991 it was restored for operation as a heritage vehicle.) In the second half of the 1930s, an additional 32 trolleybuses were added to the fleet. Also manufactured by FBW, they were 9.35 m (30.7 ft) in length, had 22 seats and 31 standing places, and remained in service until 1976. Between 1951 and 1975, TL purchased many trolleybuses secondhand from other Swiss operators, primarily the Zurich trolleybus system and the Geneva trolleybus system, and in 1981 such vehicles still made up more than half of Lausanne's fleet.

As of the end of 1964, the system had a large fleet of trolleybuses and 20 passenger-carrying trailers. In 1975, 18 new trolleybuses arrived in Lausanne. Between 1982 and 1989, a total of 72 new trolleybuses were purchased. A few Lausanne trolleybuses had extremely long careers. Three acquired in 1951 from Zurich, nos. 536–538 (originally Zurich 54–56, then TL 36–38 until 1963/64), had been built in 1939 and by the 1980s they were among the oldest trolleybuses still in service anywhere in the world – probably the oldest. They were finally retired in 1984, at 45 years of age.

In 2001–2002, 28 Neoplan articulated trolleybuses were added to the fleet, replacing 29 rigid 12-metre-long (40 ft) vehicles built between 1964 and 1969. TL experienced problems with the Neoplan trolleybuses, and all were taken out of service in May 2005, after only 3–4 years of use; they never returned to service, and were eventually sold in 2010 to a dealer in secondhand vehicles in Romania, who sold them to the Ploiești system.

In 2012, the TL trolleybus fleet consisted of 58 rigid (two-axle) and 35 articulated vehicles. There were also 53 trailers available for coupling to the rigid trolleybuses, the Lausanne trolleybus system being one of only two trolleybus systems worldwide that still utilised this form of operation at that time, the other being the Lucerne system. In addition, at that time, the Lausanne system was, along with the La Chaux-de-Fonds and Lucerne systems, one of only three trolleybus systems in Switzerland still using non-articulated vehicles. By 2017, after trailer operation elsewhwere had ended, the Lausanne system was the world's last trolleybus system to use trailers.

Trailer operation ended in 2021, following the delivery of more new articulated trolleybuses, the last day of trailer use with trolleybuses being 4 May 2021, and the last non-articulated trolleybuses were also withdrawn around that time. (Three two-axle trolleybuses initially remained in use for driving training, nos. 751–73, but had been withdrawn by October 2021.)

=== Retired fleet and heritage vehicles ===
Note: All trolleybuses that had been in the fleet before 1964 were renumbered around 1963/64 into the 500 series — most through the simple addition of a "5" (or 50) before their original fleet number, but nos. 51–56 became 613–618.

Fleet nos.	Qty.	Manufacturer	Electrics	Model	Type	Low-floor	Built	Withdrawn
1	1	Saurer	Saurer		rigid	no	1932	1964
2–3	2	FBW / SWS	BBC		rigid	no	1932	1964
4–35	32	FBW / Eggli	BBC		rigid	no	1938–1939	1976
36	1	FBW / Tüscher	MFO		rigid	no	1939	1984
37–38	2	FBW / SWS	MFO		rigid	no	1939	1984
41–48	8	FBW / Eggli	BBC	51	rigid	no	1951	1987
51–56	6	FBW / Eggli	BBC	51	rigid	no	1951	1987
591–599	9	FBW / FFA	MFO		rigid	no	1948–52	c. 1990
601–612	12	FBW / SWS	BBC		rigid	no	1942–50	By 1984
625–630	6	FBW / SWS	BBC		rigid	no	1957	c. 1989
631–636	6	FBW / Tüscher	MFO	91	rigid	no	1948—49	c. 1985
637–646	10	FBW / Tüscher	MFO	91	rigid	no	1952–55	c. early 1990
647–650	10	FBW / SWS	MFO	91	rigid	no	1956–57	c. 1990
651–675	25	FBW / Eggli	BBC	71	rigid	no	1963–1964	c. 2001
676–679	4	FBW / Eggli	BBC	91	rigid	no	1968	c. 2002
701–718	18	FBW / Hess	SAAS	91	rigid	no	1975–1976	2003
721–750	30	FBW / Hess	BBC-Sécheron	91	rigid	no	1981–1984	2010–2013
751–792	42	NAW / Lauber	BBC-Sécheron		rigid	no	1986–1990	2015–2018
800 + 801–827	28	Neoplan	Kiepe	N6121	articulated, dual-mode bus	yes	2001–2002 (No. 800 in 1998)	2005
901–904	4	Schenk	none		trailer	no	1950s	1974
911–916	6	Moser	none		trailer	no	1950–51	1990
901–920	20	Hess	none	APM	trailer	yes	1989	2020–2021
921–930	10	Hess	none	APM	trailer	yes	2006–2007	2021
931–950	20	Moser / Eggli	none		trailer	yes	1963–1964	2003
951–973	23	Rochat / Lauber	none		trailer	no	1974–1979	c. 2010
981	1	Hess / Lanz + Marti	none		trailer (prototype)	yes	1986	2010

==== Vehicles preserved or sold for continued use ====
Trailer no. 981 was retired in 2010, and has since been owned by the RétroBus Léman preservation society. It was the first low-floor trolleybus vehicle in Switzerland. Trolleybus no. 2, dating back to the opening of the Lausanne system in 1932, has also been preserved. By 2000, it was one of the oldest operable trolleybus in the world; however, as of 2014 it had not been in operating condition since the end of 2013, and its present condition is unclear.

During the 2000s, the TL also sold some withdrawn trolleybuses, including the Neoplans, to a Romanian used-bus dealer, who in turn sold them to the trolleybus operators in Sibiu and Ploiești.

Nos. 953 and 950 (trailer) were sold to the Seashore Trolley Museum in Maine, United States, leaving in August 2003.

=== Current fleet ===
Lausanne's present trolleybus fleet consists of 103 exclusively articulated vehicles, the last two-axle vehicles having been withdrawn in 2021.

Fleet nos.	Quantity	Manufacturer	Electrics	Type	Model	Built
831–865	35	Hess	Vossloh Kiepe	Conventional- articulated	Swisstrolley 3 (BGT-N2C)	2009–2010
866–892	27	Hess	Vossloh Kiepe	Conventional- articulated	Swisstrolley 4 (BGT-N2D)	2012–2013
701–712	12	Hess	ABB	Double-articulated	LighTram 25DC	2020–2021
801–829	29	Hess	ABB	Conventional- articulated	LighTram 19DC	2021–2023
On order:
	37	Hess	Siemens	Conventional- articulated	LighTram 19DC	2026–
721–734	14	Hess	Siemens	Double-articulated	LighTram 25DC	2026–

== Depots ==
The Lausanne trolleybus fleet is stored in the La Borde and Perrelet depots. When opened in 1932, the system's only depot was Prélaz, shared with trams and located on Avenue de Morges, on the western half of route 7 (now route 17). A second trolleybus depot, La Borde, opened in 1951; it was rebuilt in 1979–1982. Prélaz depot closed in 1995 and was replaced by Perrelet depot, located farther west on route 7.

== See also ==
- Lausanne railway station
- List of trolleybus systems in Switzerland

== Notes and references ==
- Schwandl, Robert (2010). Schwandl's Tram Atlas Schweiz & Österreich. Berlin: Robert Schwandl Verlag. ISBN 978 3 936573 27 5. (in German and English)
