= Trolleybuses in Lucerne =

Transit system in Lucerne, Switzerland

Lucerne trolleybus system
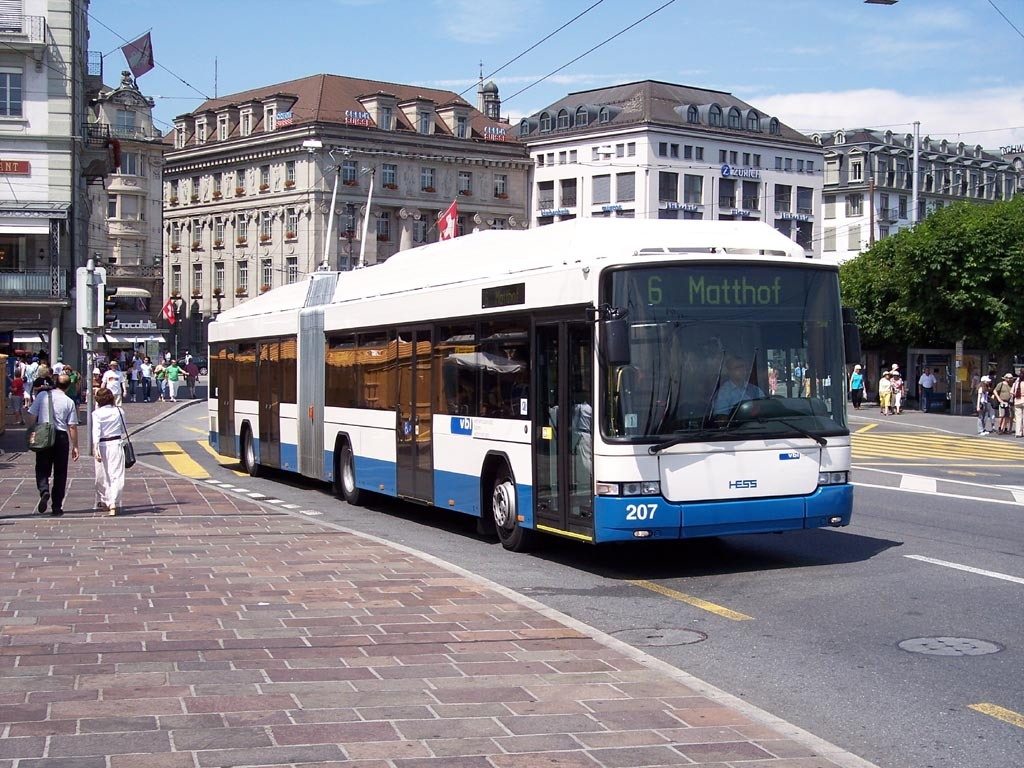
- A Hess Swisstrolley crossing the Reuss, 2005.

Operation
- Locale: Lucerne, Switzerland
- Open: 7 December 1941
- Status: Open
- Routes: 7
- Operator: Verkehrsbetriebe Luzern (VBL)

Infrastructure
- Electrification: 600 V DC parallel overhead lines

Statistics
- Route length: 37.634 km (23.385 mi)
Overview
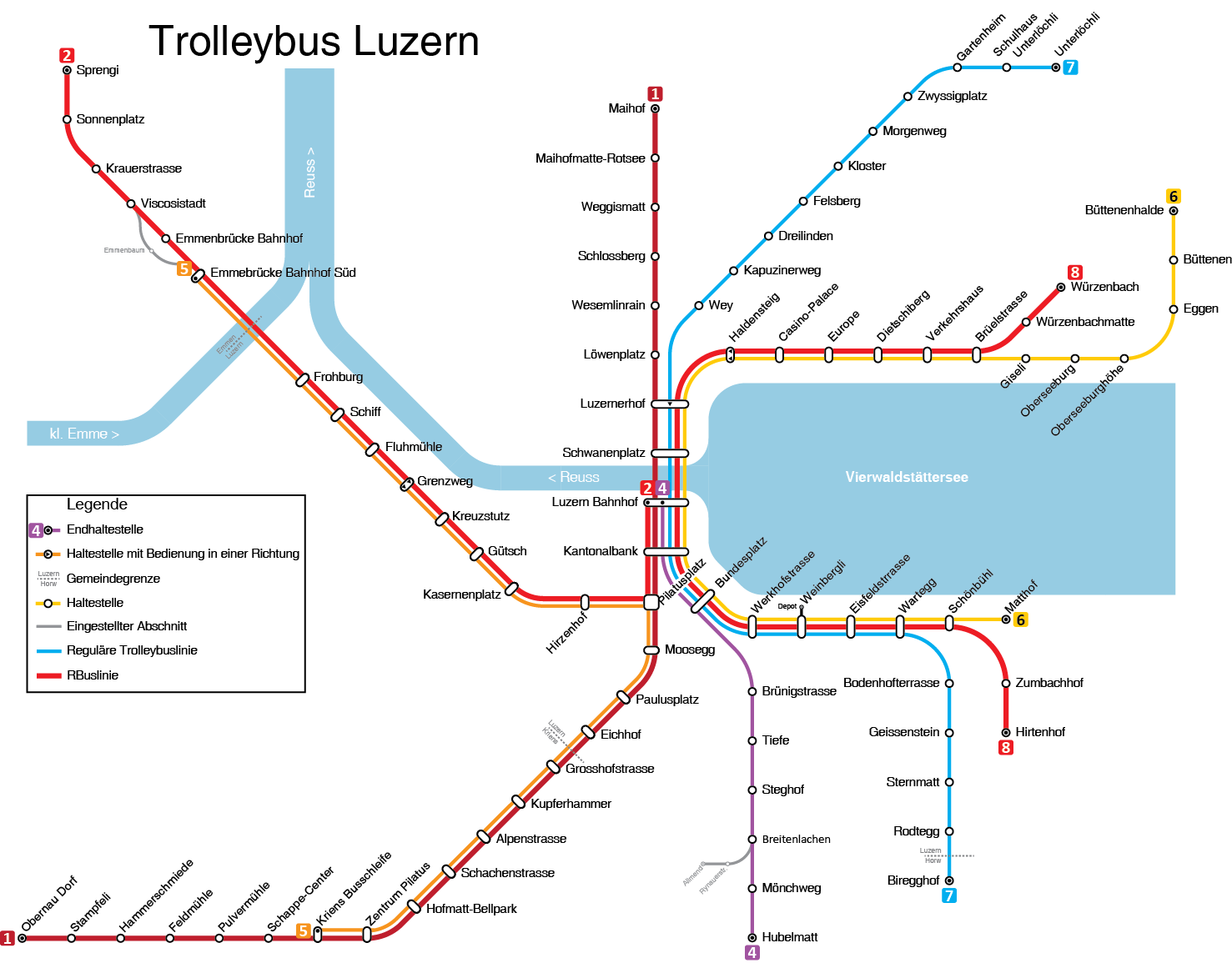
- Website: http://www.vbl.ch Verkehrsbetriebe Luzern (VBL) (in German)

The Lucerne trolleybus system (Alemannic German: Trolleybussystem Luzern) forms part of the public transport network of Lucerne, which is the capital city of the canton of Lucerne in Switzerland. Opened in 1941, the system had replaced the Lucerne tramway network by 1961.

As of the end of 2013, the system consists of seven lines, one of which leads across the city boundary into the neighbouring towns of Emmen, Horw and Kriens. It is currently operated by Verkehrsbetriebe Luzern (VBL), has a total route length of 37.634 km (23.385 mi), and carried 27 million passengers annually as of 2011. The system is supplemented by various motor bus lines operated by the same transport company.

== History ==
The system's individual trolleybus line sections went into service as follows:

7 December 1941	Bahnhof Luzern–Allmend (2.59 km)	Bahnhof Luzern–Breitenlachen: now line 4 Breitenlachen–Allmend: decommissioned since 2005	New connection
25 January 1942	Bahnhof Luzern–Dietschiberg	now lines 6 and 8	New connection
20 May 1951	Luzernerhof–Wesemlinrain	now line 1	Motor bus replacement
15 November 1959	Dietschiberg–Würzenbach (1.05 km); Bundesplatz–Emmenbrücke (4.38 km)	now lines 6 and 8 now line 2	Motor bus replacement Tramway replacement
11 November 1961	Pilatusplatz–Kriens Busschleife; Wesemlinrain–Maihof	now line 1	Tramway replacement
11 November 1962	Breitenlachen–Hubelmatt	now line 4	New connection
10 April 1966	Bundesplatz–Matthof; Wartegg–Biregghof	now line 6 now line 7	New connection
2 July 1986	Schönbühl–Hirtenhof	now line 8	New connection
5 November 1990	Kriens Busschleife–Obernau Dorf; Emmenbrücke–Sprengi	now line 1 now line 2	Motor bus replacement New connection
23 August 2004	Wesemlinrain–Unterlöchli	now line 7	New connection
15 December 2013	Brüelstrasse–Büttenenhalde	now line 6	Motor bus replacement
12 December 2016	Kriens-Emmenbruecke	now line 5	New connection (75th anniversary)

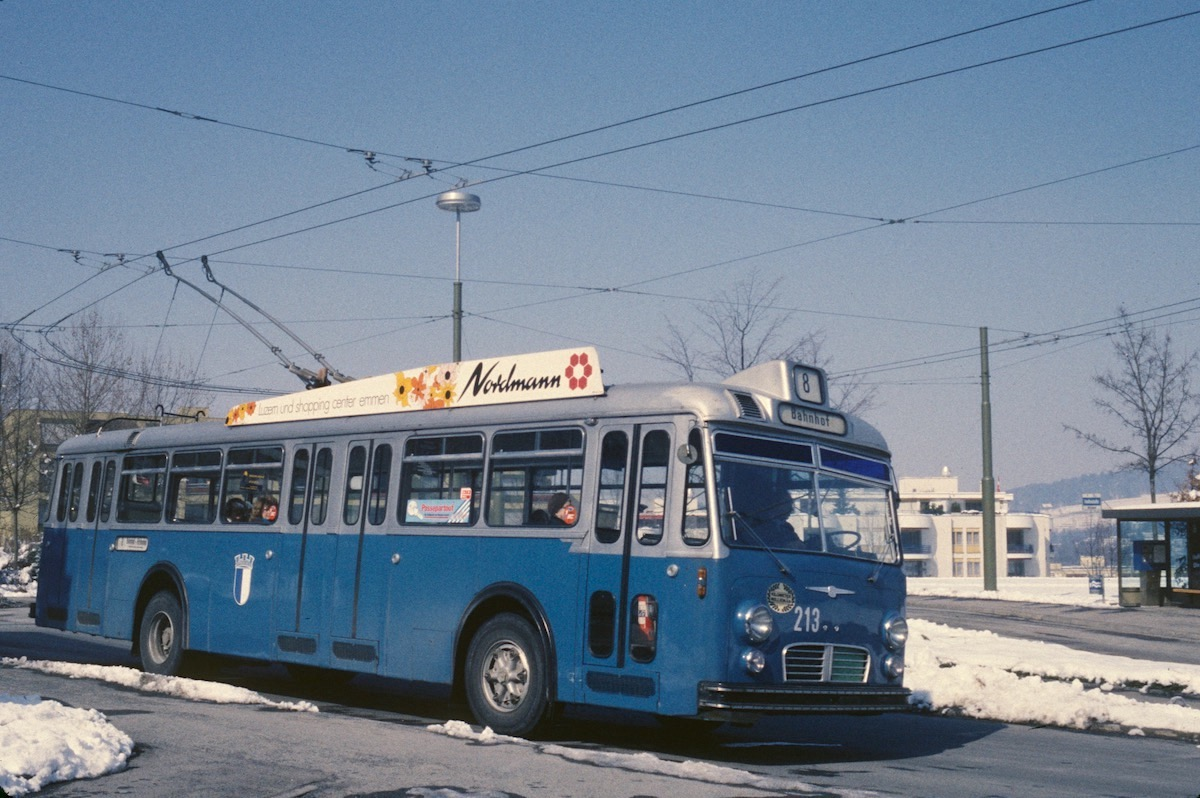
A 1960 FBW trolleybus at Hirtenhof in 1987, a few months after route 8 was converted to trolleybuses

== Lines ==
The present system is made up of the following lines:

1	Obernau Dorf–Ebikon, Fildern	cross-city route	38 stops	every 7.5 minutes	Bi-articulated buses
2	Sprengi–Bahnhof Luzern	radial route	16 stops	every 7.5 minutes	Bi-articulated buses
4	Hubelmatt–Bahnhof Luzern	radial route	9 stops	every 10 minutes	Articulated buses
5	Kriens–Emmenbrücke	cross-city route	20 stops	peak times every 7.5 minutes / off peak every 15 minutes	Articulated buses
6	Matthof–Büttenenhalde	cross-city route	23/24 stops	rush hour every 10 minutes / off-peak every 15 minutes	Articulated buses
7	Biregghof–Unterlöchli	cross-city route	23/24 stops	every 7.5 minutes / off-peak every 15 minutes	Articulated buses
8	Hirtenhof–Würzenbach	cross-city route	19/20 stops	rush hour every 10 minutes / off-peak every 15 minutes	Bi-articulated buses

Lines 6 and 8 operate on the same overhead wires between Brüelstrasse and Schönbühl, so that on this section there are trolleybuses at 5-minute intervals during rush hour, and at 7.5-minute intervals at off-peak times. This combined section is described as double-line 6/8.

== Fleet ==
As of 31 December 2013, the VBL trolleybus fleet had 20 rigid, 26 articulated, and three bi-articulated vehicles There were also 16 trailers that can be used in combination with the rigid buses.

The system's first double-articulated trolleybuses were purchased in 2006 and were among the first such vehicles in Switzerland (apart from a 2003 prototype); the three vehicles were delivered at the end of 2006 and given numbers 231–233.

In the 2010s, the Lucerne system was one of only two trolleybus systems worldwide, along with the Lausanne trolleybus system, that still operated trolleybuses towing passenger trailers. However, trailer use on the Lucerne system ended on 10 October 2017, following the delivery of more new articulated trolleybuses, and such usage also ended in Lausanne – the last trolleybus system in the world to use trailers – on 4 May 2021.

Image	Fleet nos.	Quantity	Manufacturer	Electrics	Type	Configuration	Low-floor	Built
	201–226	26	Hess	Vossloh Kiepe	BGT-N2C	Articulated	yes	2004–2009
	231–233	3	Hess	Vossloh Kiepe	BGGT-N2C	Bi-articulated	yes	2006
	234–242	9	Hess	Vossloh Kiepe	BGGT-N2D	Bi-articulated	yes	2014
	252–254, 257–280	27	NAW / Hess	Siemens	BT 5-25	Rigid	no	1989 (no. 251 built 1987–88)
	301–316	16	Lanz + Marti / Hess	none	APM 5.6-13	Trailer	yes	1998–2005

Type BGT 5-25 originally comprised 20 vehicles, nos. 181–200.

Of the 30 rigid versions of that type, the BT 5-25, to be acquired by the VBL, three vehicles had been retired by 2012: nos. 251, 255 and 256. In 2014, ten vehicles from that series were sold to the Valparaíso trolleybus system, in Chile: Nos. 265, 266, 268–270, 272, 273, 275, 276, 278.

== Depot ==
The Weinbergli depot is located on the route of lines 6, 7 and 8.

== See also ==
- List of trolleybus systems in Switzerland
