= Panzermuseum Thun =

Coordinates: 46.757834°N 7.616363°E

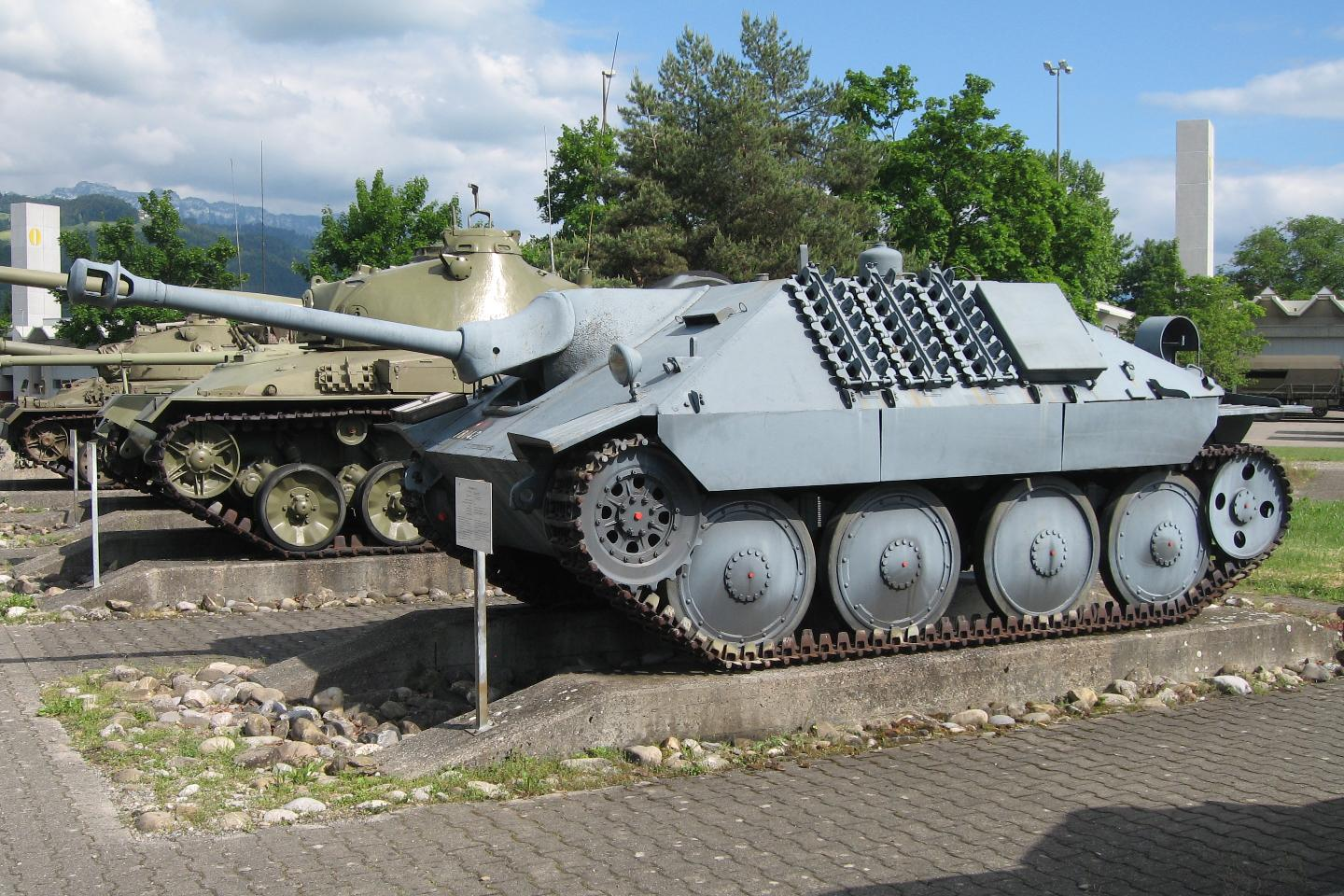
- Panzerjäger G 13 (2011)
- Location: Outdoor area of the Thun weapons range
- Type: History museum, technology museum
- Visitors: 6600 (2011)
- Director: Swiss Army Museum Association
- Website: Panzermuseum Thun on the HAM Foundation website

The Panzermuseum Thun was a museum in Thun in the Canton of Bern in Switzerland. Exhibited in the museum were foreign and Swiss tanks as well as examples of Swiss self-propelled artillery and static artillery. After an announcement in November 2023, the museum's outdoor collection was dissolved and closed to the public in 2024.

== Description ==
Until the museum's dissolution, a number of vehicles were exhibited in the open air at the Thun weapons range and were able to be viewed during office hours of the Swiss Army Museum Association within the Dufour barracks, entrance on Military Street. Since some of the over forty exhibits had been stored in the open air for a long time, a large number of them were restricted in their ability to drive and function.

Due to the museum's closure, its outdoor inventory was largely transferred to other collections. Non-swiss vehicles were moved to the Swiss Military Museum in Full-Reuenthal, while domestic vehicles were handed over to the collection of the Historic Military Equipment Foundation in Burgdorf, Switzerland. A small selection of vehicles remains in Thun, though this collection is now inaccessible to the general public save for guided tours upon request.

== Exhibits ==
The following exhibits were able to be seen on the exhibition grounds:

Name	Type – year of manufacture – procurement	Characteristics	Photo
Vickers-Carden-Loyd	Light combat vehicle (GB), manufactured in 1934, 6 units were purchased for the Swiss Army (2 in 1934, 4 in 1935)	2 men, 1 × 7.5 mm machine gun, 3.8 tons	Vickers-Carden-Loyd Light Tank Model 1935
Renault FT	Light combat vehicle (F), manufactured from 1917, 5 units were purchased (2 in 1921, 3 in 1939)	2 men, 1 × 3.7 cm cannon, 6.7 tons	Renault FT-17
Tiger II "Königstiger"	King Tiger B, main battle tank (D), manufactured in 1944, handed over to the Swiss Military Museum in 2007 as a permanent loan.	1 × 8.8 cm cannon L71, 3 × 7.92 mm-MG, 5 men, 68 tons	Panzerkampfwagen VI Tiger II
T17E1 Staghound	Scout tanks (GB), manufactured in 1943, 64 units were purchased (early 1950s), never introduced, used as target vehicles	5 men, 1 × 37 mm cannon, 2 × MG, 12 tons	Staghound
M3	Special tank (USA), year of manufacture 1941/42, conversion from M4 main battle tank	6 men, dummy cannon, 27 tons	
Panzer 68	Panzer 68/88, Swiss main battle tank (CH), manufactured 1988–1993, 195 units	4 men, 1 × 10.5 cm cannon, 2 × 7.5 mm MG, 41 tons	Panzer 68/88 Schweizer Kampfpanzer (CH)
Centurion (tank)	Centurion main battle tank (GB), procurement 1958–1960, 100 units procured	4 men 1 × 10.5 cm cannon, 2 × 7.5 mm MG, 50 tons	Centurion Kampfpanzer (GB)
Entpannungspanzer 65	Prototype special tank on chassis Pz 61 (CH), one example procured	4 men, 40 tons	Entpannungspanzer 65
M48 Patton	Main battle tank (USA), year of manufacture 1954, exchange item	4 men, 1 × 9 cm cannon, 1 × 7.62 mm MG, 1 × 12 mm MG, 45 tons	Kampfpanzer M48
Nahkampfkanone 1	Self-propelled gun (CH), year of manufacture 1943, prototype on an extended Pz 39 chassis	5 men	Nahkampfkanone 1
7.5 cm cannon	later 10.5 cm Howitze 42	10 tons	
Nahkampfkanone 2 Gustav	Assault gun (CH), year of manufacture 1942–1945, prototype in four versions, no series production	5 men, 7.5 cm anti-tank gun, 24 tons	Nahkampfkanone II
Schützenpanzer Lang HS.30	Armored personnel carrier (D), manufactured from 1956, two prototypes without a turret in military testing, exchange item	2+8 men, 1 × 20 mm cannon, 14.6 tons	Schützenpanzer HS 30
Panzerwagen 39 (Praga)	Light combat vehicle (CSR/CH), year of manufacture 1938–1939, 24 purchased	3 men, 24 mm cannon 38, 2 × 7.5 mm machine guns, 8 tons	Panzerwagen 39 'PRAGA'
Universal Carrier T16	Transport vehicle for Panzer-Grenadiers (GB), manufactured in 1944, 302 purchased, sold again in 1965	2+6 men, 4.7 tons	Universal-Carrier T16
Hetzer	Self-propelled gun (CSR/D), year of manufacture 1944–1949, 158 purchased	1 × 7.5 cm anti-tank gun 1940, 1 × 7.5 mm MG, 4 men, 16 tons	Panzerjäger G13
Leichter Panzer 51	Scout tank (F), year of manufacture 1953–1957	200 bought	Leichter Panzer 51
7.5 cm tank gun 51	1 × 7.5 mm machine gun, 3 men	14,5 tons	
AMX 13 self-propelled howitzer	Tank artillery (F), manufactured in 1956, 4 purchased for troop trials		
10.5 cm howitzer L30	1 × 7.5mm or 7.62mm machine gun, 5 men	16,5 tons	
Panzer 58	Main battle tank (CH), year of manufacture 1958, 2 prototypes, 10 pre-series vehicles	1 × 8.4 cm tank gun 58, 1 × 20 mm cannon, 1 × 7.5 mm MG, 4 men, 35 tons	Panzer 58
Saurer Tartaruga	Combat armored personnel carrier (CH), manufactured in 1959 or later, an exhibit purchased for testing	1 × 20 mm MK, 3+9 men, 18.2 tons (with turret)	Saurer Tartaruga
Mowag Pirat	Combat armored personnel carrier (CH), manufactured in 1962, an exhibit purchased for testing	1 × 20 mm cannon (turret dismantled), 3+9 men, 18.1 tons	Schützenpanzer MOWAG Pirat
Fliegerabwehrpanzer 68	Special tank (CH), year of manufacture 1977/78, 2 prototypes	2 × 35 mm cannon Oerlikon KDA, 3 men, 46 tons	35 mm Flab Panzer B22L
15 cm heavy howitzer 1942	L28 howitzer (CH), manufactured in 1942	ready to fire 6.8 tons	
76.2 mm anti-tank gun	Anti-tank gun "Ratsch-Bumm“ (USSR), manufactured in 1938	2 tons	
4.7 cm Pak on Renault R35	Tank destroyer (D), year of manufacture 1941–1944, gift from F, trials in CH	1 × 4,7-cm-anti-tank gun (CSR), 3 men, 10 tons	
Sturmgeschütz III	Sturmpanzer (D), year of manufacture 1943–1945, gift from F, trials in CH	1 × 7.5 cm cannon L48, 1 × 7.92 mm MG, 4 men, 24 tons	StuG III
Hetzer	Tank destroyer (CSR/D), year of manufacture 1944–1945, gift from F, trials in CH, predecessor of the G13	1 × 7.5 cm anti-tank gun 39 L48, 1 × Flab-MG, 4 men, 16 tons	Jagdpanzer 38(t)
Jagdpanzer IV/48	Assault gun (D), year of manufacture 1943–1945, gift from F, trials in CH	1 × 7.5 cm cannon L48, 1 × 7.92 mm MG, 5 men, 24 tons	Jagdpanzer IV
Panzer IV Typ H	Main battle tank (D), year of manufacture 1937–1945, gift from F, trials in CH	1 × 7.5 cm cannon L48, 2 × 7.92 mm MG, 5 men, 22.4 tons	Panzerkampfwagen IV
Jagdpanzer V Jagdpanther	Tank destroyer (D), year of manufacture 1943–1945, gift from F, trials in CH	1 × 8.8 cm cannon L71, 1 × 7.92 mm MG, 5 men, 46 tons	Jagdpanther
Panther tank	Main battle tank (D), year of manufacture 1943–1945, gift from F, trials in CH	1 × 7.5 cm cannon L70, 3 × 7.92 mm MG, 5 men, 44.8 tons	Panzerkampfwagen V Panther Ausführung D
8,8 cm PaK 43	L71 from battle tank VI Tiger II (D), manufactured in 1944	Ball screen Tiger II from battle tank VI Tiger II (D), year of manufacture 1944, thickness 150 mm	8,8-cm-PaK 43
M7 Priest	Self-propelled gun (USA), year of manufacture from 1942, gift from F, trials in CH	1 × 10.5 cm howitzer, 1 × 12.7 mm MG, 7 men, 24 tons	M7 Priest
Schützenpanzer SPz 11-2 Kurz Hotchkiss	Armored personnel carrier (F), year of manufacture 1951, exchange item, special equipment for radio operators	1 × 7.5 mm MG, 2+5 men, 8 tons	Schützenpanzer Kurz Hotchkiss
M47 Patton	Main battle tank (USA), manufactured in 1950, purchased for trials in CH	1 × 9 cm cannon L70, 2 × 7.62 mm MG, 1 × 12.7 mm MG, 5 men, 44 tons	M47
M4 Sherman	Main battle tank (USA), manufactured in 1942, purchased for tests in Switzerland	1 × 7.5 cm cannon, 2 × 7.62 mm MG, 1 × 12.7 mm MG, 5 men, 32 tons	M4 Sherman
Centurion Bridgelayer	Bridge-laying tank (GB), year of manufacture 1961–1963, 2 exhibits purchased for tests in the CH chassis such as the Pz 57 Centurion	3 men, 50.8 tons	Centurion Bridgelayer
Centurion (tank)	Main battle tank (GB), year of manufacture 1948–1952, purchased in Canada	1 × 8.4 cm cannon, 2 × 7.6 mm MG, 4 men, 50 tons	Centurion Mark III
T-34/85 Kampfpanzer (UdSSR)	Year of manufacture 1943–1953, exchange item	1 × 85 mm cannon, 2 × 7.62 mm MG, 5 men, 32 tons	T-34-85 model 1945
AMX-VCI	Armored personnel carrier (F) (Infantry Combat Vehicle), manufactured from 1955, purchased for trials in Switzerland	1 × 7.62 mm machine gun in turret (removed), 2+10 men, 12.5 tons	AMX-VCI
T-54	Main battle tank (USSR), exchange item	1 × 10 cm cannon, 2 × 7.62 mm MG, 4 men, 36 tons	T 54
Leopard 2	Main battle tank (D) M+77101 was the first of 35 Leopard 2s delivered from Germany in 1987, 345 Leopard 2s were manufactured in Thun until 1993	4 men, 120 mm smoothbore cannon, 42 rounds, 62 tons	Leopard 2

== See also ==
- List of museums in Switzerland

== Literature ==
- Martin Haudenschild: The development history of the Panzer 68, SAM, March edition 2006, (online-PDF 4,17 MB)
