= Saurer 2DM =

1960s truck model

Saurer 2DM 4x4
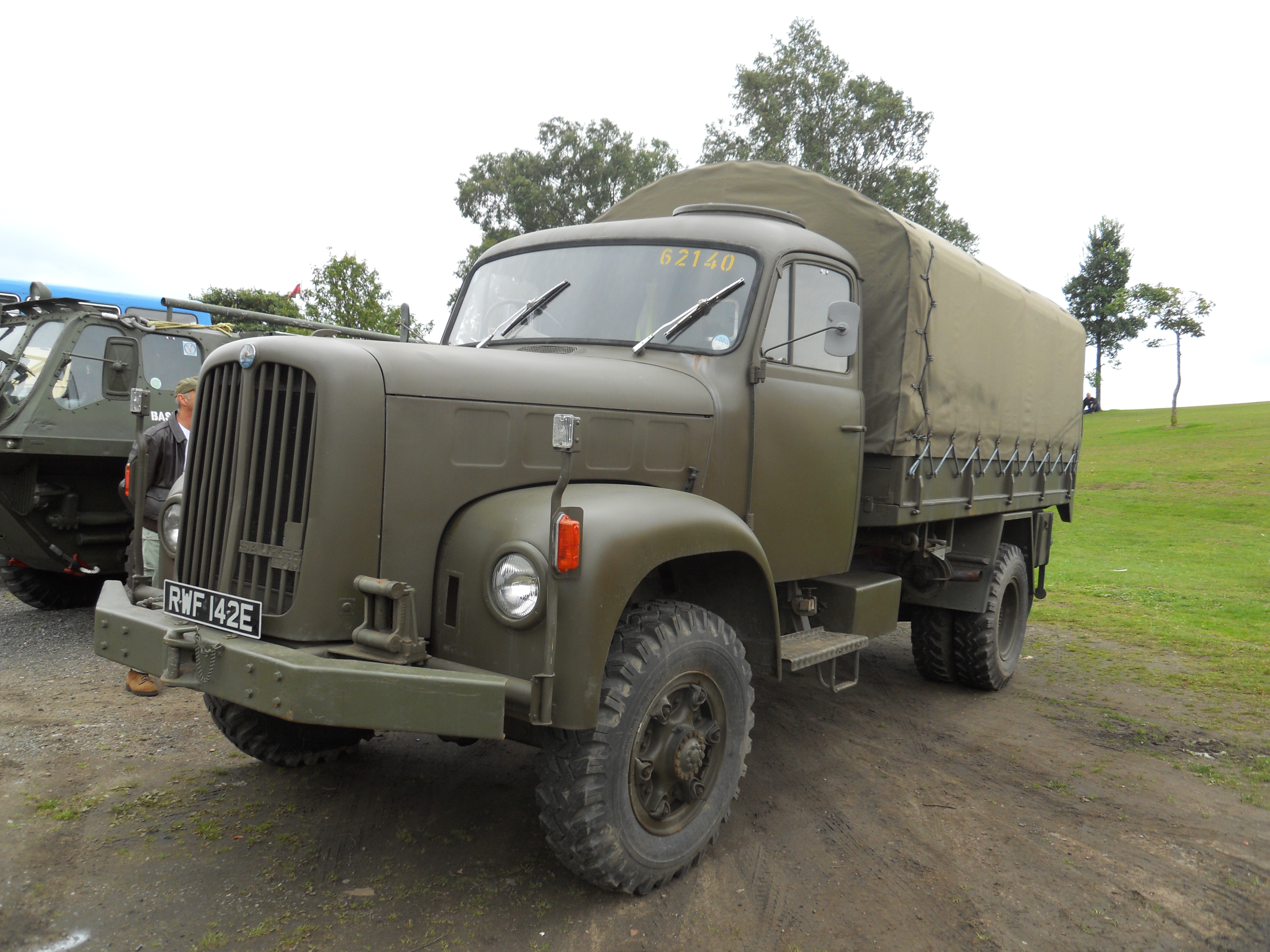
- Swiss Army Saurer 2DM
- Place of origin: Switzerland

Service history
- In service: 1964 – ?
- Used by: Switzerland Ukraine

Production history
- Designer: Adolph Saurer AG
- Designed: 1959
- Manufacturer: Saurer
- Produced: 1963 – ?
- No. built: approx. 3200
- Variants: 6DM Flatbed truck, Snowplow, Dumptruck, aircraft /Tank fueltruck

Specifications
- Mass: 7100kg
- Length: 7,37m
- length: 4,2m (wheelbase)
- Width: 2,3m
- Height: 3,2m
- Crew: 1+ 2Pax in cabin
- Engine: Saurer, Typ CT3D; 135 PS / 99 kW
- Payload capacity: 4900 kg
- Transmission: Saurer 2 D
- Suspension: 4x4 wheeled
- Fuel capacity: 160 l
- Maximum speed: 74 km/h

The Saurer 2DM is a truck model, which was established by the Adolph Saurer AG at Arbon in 1959. Its payload is 4.9 tonnes; it is a right hand drive. The Swiss Army used the 2DM since 1964 in several special versions such as dump trucks, snow plow or tanker for aircraft or tanks. Almost identical was the model Berna 2VM from Berna Olten. Starting in 1964, approximately 3200 units were built in all varieties. The 2DM was also sold for civilian purposes.
