= Berna 2 US =

Berna 2 US, 4x4
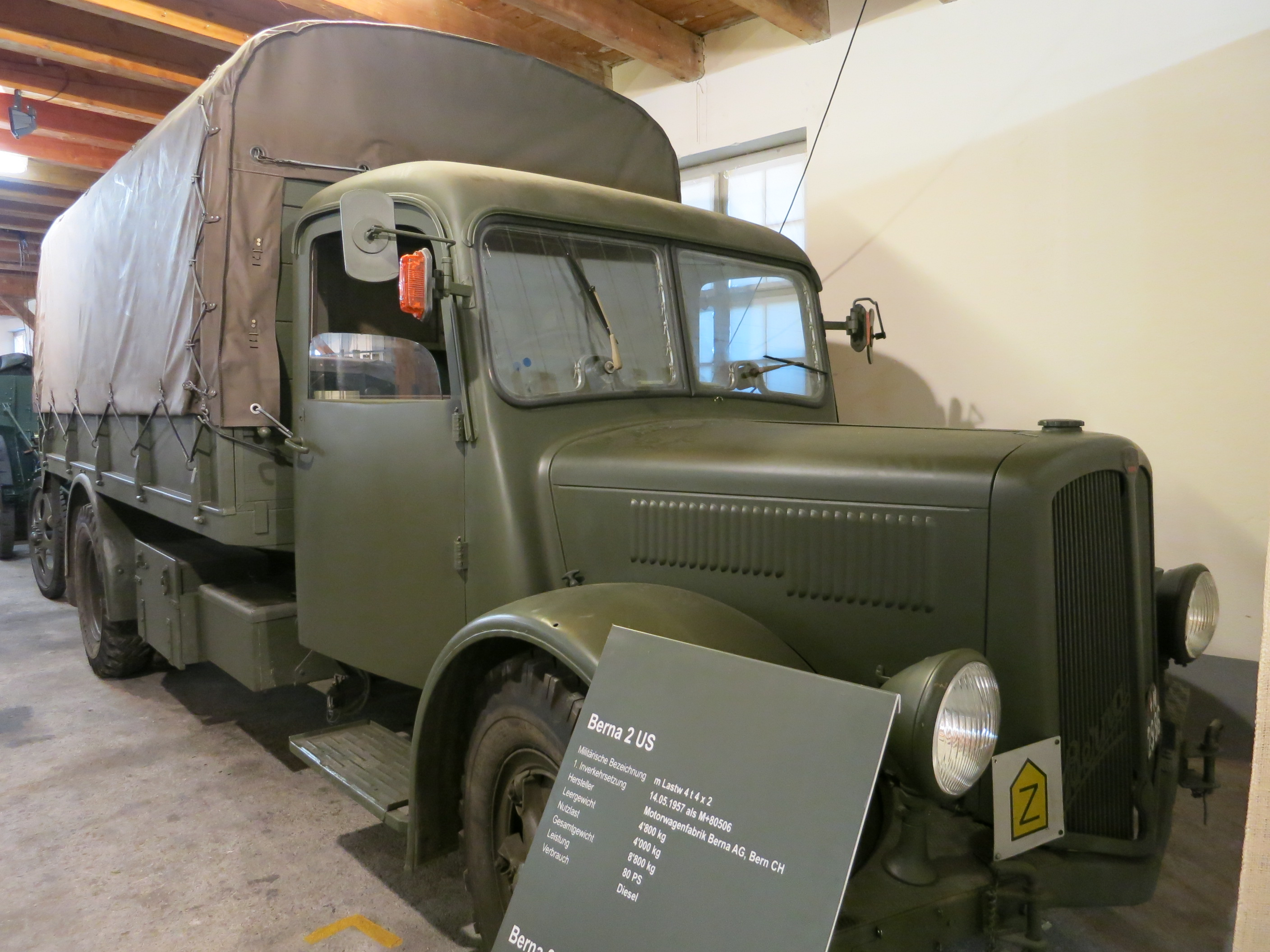
- Swiss Army Berna 2 US
- Place of origin: Switzerland

Service history
- In service: 1957 - ?
- Used by: Switzerland

Production history
- Designer: Berna Olten
- Manufacturer: Berna
- Produced: 1957 -?
- Variants: Flatbed truck

Specifications
- Mass: 8800kg
- Length: 6,710 m
- Width: 2,180 m
- Height: 3,020 m
- Crew: 1+ 2Pax in cabin + 28 on the Flatbed
- Engine: Berna Typ R2 4 Cylinder 5820 cm³ 80 PS / 59 kW
- Payload capacity: 4800 kg
- Suspension: 4x4 wheeled
- Maximum speed: 64 km/h

The Berna 2 US is a truck model manufactured by the Swiss company Berna from 1957 onwards. The payload of 4.9 tonnes, it is a right hand driven truck. The Berna 2 US, military designation "Lastw m 4.0 t 4x2", has a total weight of 8800 kg, a structure with cab and bridge as well as an on-board voltage of 24 V. The 4-cylinder diesel engine with 5820 cm^{3} produces a power of 59 kW (80 hp). The Swiss Army used it since 1957. The Berna 2 US was also sold for civilian purposes.

A Berna 2-US truck is now in the museum in the Zeughaus Schaffhausen.
