= Saurer 2 CM =

Saurer 2 CM 3,5t
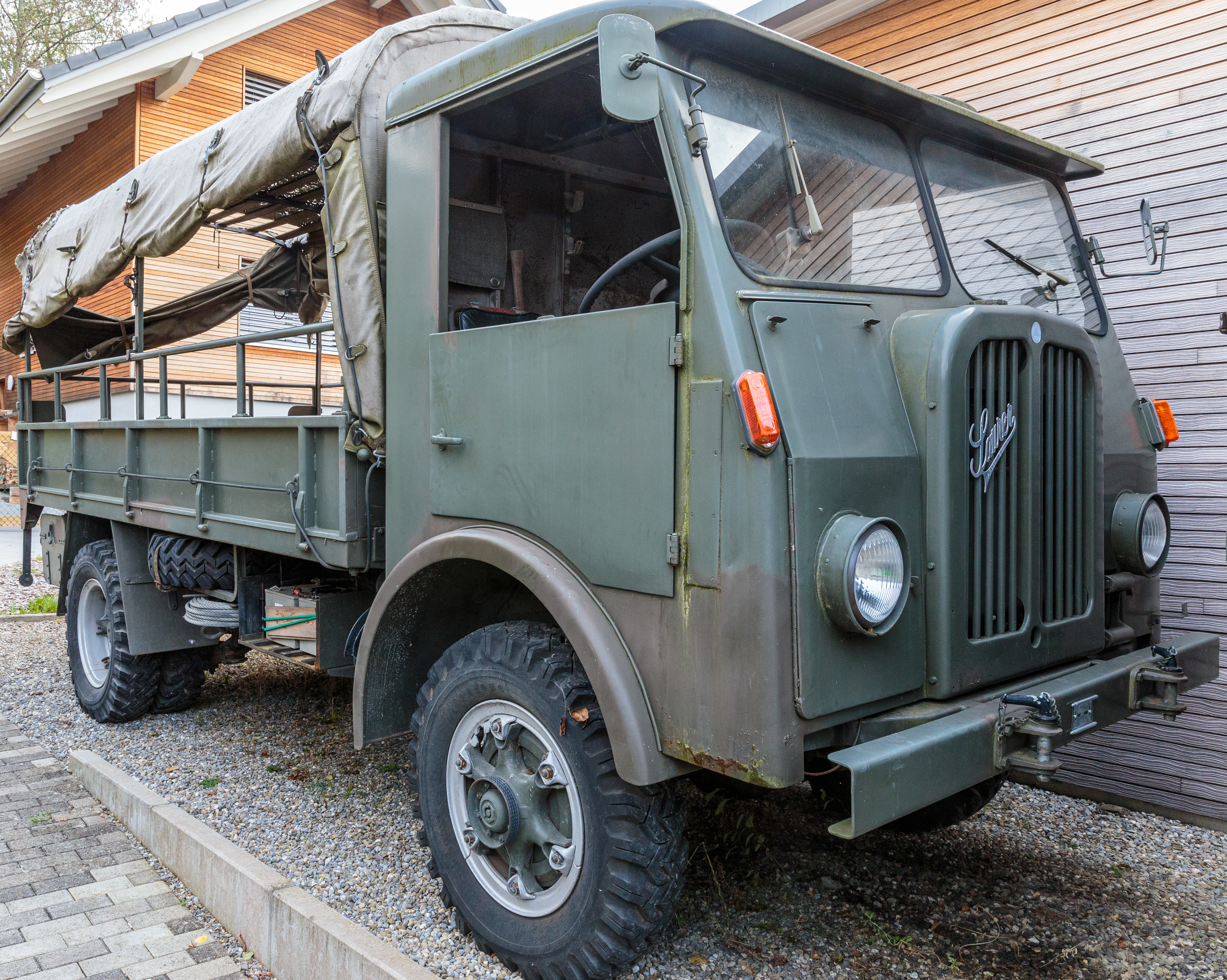
- (Retired) Swiss Army Saurer 2 CM
- Place of origin: Switzerland

Service history
- In service: 1949 - ?
- Used by: Switzerland

Production history
- Designer: Adolph Saurer AG
- Manufacturer: Saurer
- Produced: 1949 –?
- No. built: 222
- Variants: Flatbed truck, radiotruck, Drivingschooltruck

Specifications
- Mass: 5070kg
- Length: 6m
- length: 3,4 (wheelbase)
- Width: 2,25m
- Height: 3,1m
- Crew: 1+ 1Pax in cabin + 25 on the Flatbed
- Engine: Saurer, Typ CR 2 D 75 PS / 55,2 kW
- Payload capacity: 3500 kg
- Transmission: Saurer 4 C
- Suspension: 4x4wheeled
- Fuel capacity: 100 l
- Maximum speed: 54,6 km/h

The Saurer 2 CM is a 4x4 truck model established by the Adolph Saurer AG in 1949 with a payload of 2.5 tons. There were 222 build most of them with a loading bridge, while some were made with a fixed structure as a van. The vehicles are right-hand driven. A winch was optional. The Saurer CM2 was also built by Berna and FBW (Franz Brozincevic Wetzikon) under their own names (FBW AX / Berna 2). The Saurer CM 2 formed the basis for other vehicles with more powerful engine and a larger payload capacity like Saurer 4CM 5t, Saurer 4CM driving school cars, Saurer Woodcarrier 4CM, 5CM 6t Saurer trucks and a mobile command center of the flab. One is on display at the Schweizerisches Militärmuseum Full.

== Bibliography ==
- Kurt Sahli, Jo Wiedmer: Saurer. Nutzfahrzeuge damals und heute. Buri, Bern 1983, ISBN 3-7169-2101-7.
- Alber Wüst: Die Schweizerische Fliegerabwehr. 2011, ISBN 978-3-905616-20-0
- Fahrzeuge der Schweizer Armee by Markus Hofmann (2000)
