= MG 29 =

Flieger MG 29
- Type: Light machine gun
- Place of origin: Switzerland

Service history
- Used by: Switzerland

Production history
- Designer: Adolf Furrer
- Designed: 1920s
- Manufacturer: W+F Bern
- Produced: 1920s-1930s
- Variants: Single and twin gun variants

Specifications
- Cartridge: 7.5x55 mm GP11
- Caliber: 7.5 mm
- Barrels: 1-2
- Action: Recoil, toggle lock firing from closed bolt
- Rate of fire: 1200RPM
- Feed system: Belt fed
- Sights: Iron or optical

The Flieger MG 29 (also called the Flab MG or FLab MG 29/38) was a Swiss light machine gun developed in the 1920s and produced until shortly before the dawn of the Second World War. It was mounted on aircraft and was later used as an anti-aircraft gun. However, it was too heavy to be used as an infantry support weapon. It employed a closed bolt system using a toggle locking system developed for the LMG25. Some guns had the ability to attach a large box onto the bottom of the machine gun to hold the ammunition belt. Two versions of the gun existed, the "normal" version and a second version which bolted two guns together and made them to fire from the same trigger, known as the "Doppel-MG" (double machine gun). Both air cooling and water cooling were used for both single and double guns depending on application. There was a version tested in a water cooled version using the MG11 Maxim tripod. Only a few were built.

After the second world war, better anti aircraft systems and aircraft weapons were available to Switzerland and the infantry support role was filled by the MG 51. The higher rate of fire, but much heavier MG 29 was finally mounted on the first prototype of the Panzer 58, the precursor to the more famous Panzer 61 tank before being retired.

== See also ==
- List of machine guns
- List of multiple-barrel firearms
