= Berna 2VM =

Berna 2VM, 4x4
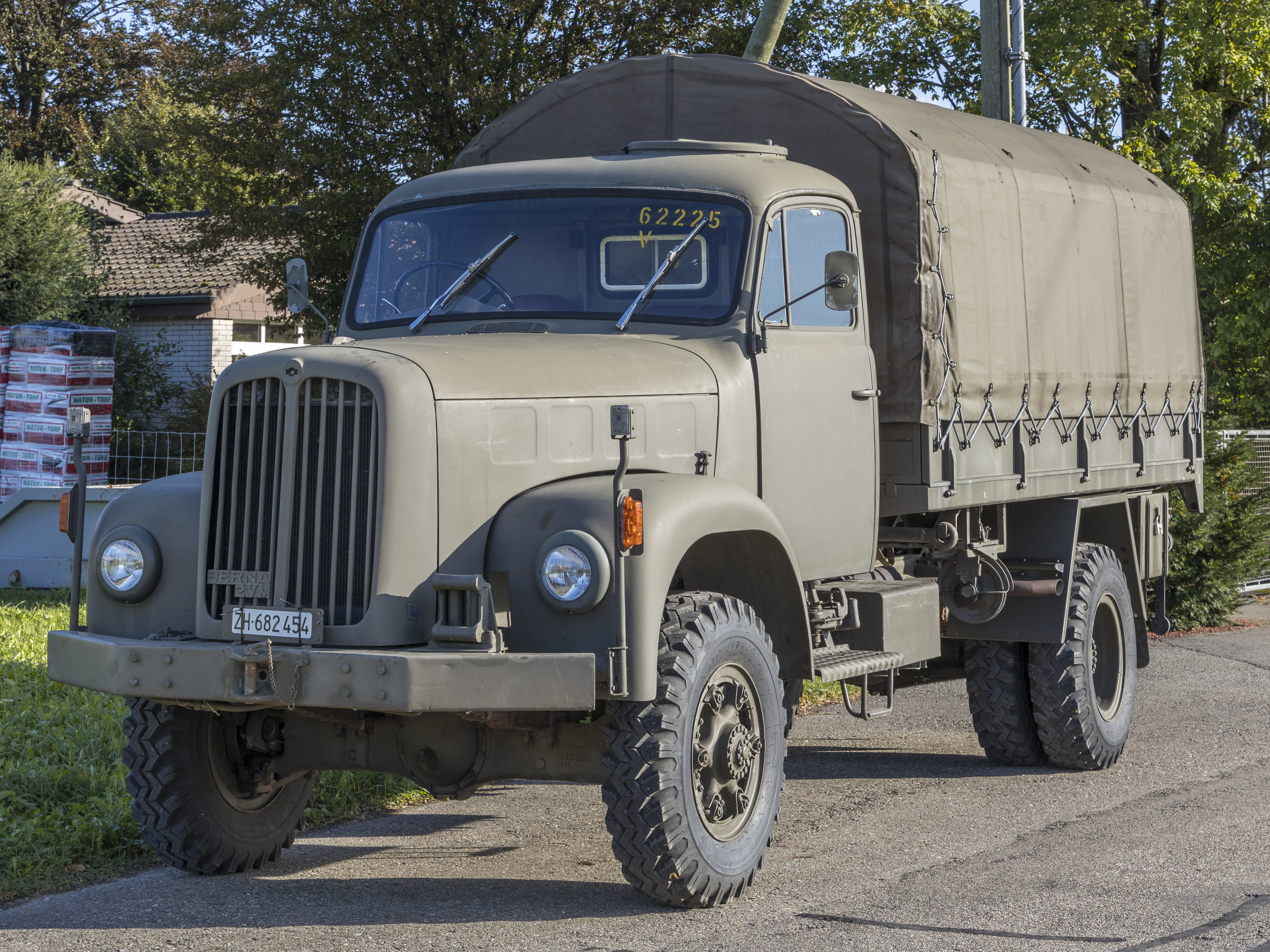
- Swiss Army Berna 2VM
- Place of origin: Switzerland

Service history
- In service: 1964 - ?
- Used by: Switzerland

Production history
- Designer: Berna Olten
- Designed: 1964
- Manufacturer: Berna
- Produced: 1964 -1976
- No. built: 1600
- Variants: 2VM Flatbed truck, Snowplow, Dumptruck, aircraft /Tank fueltruck

Specifications
- Mass: 7100kg
- Length: 7,37m
- length: 4,2m (wheelbase)
- Width: 2,3m
- Height: 3,2m
- Crew: 1+ 2Pax in cabin
- Engine: Diselmotor Berna T3, 6 Cylinder in line 8100ccm 135 PS / 99 kW
- Payload capacity: 4900 kg
- Suspension: 4x4 wheeled
- Fuel capacity: 160 l
- Maximum speed: 75 km/h

The Berna 2VM is a Swiss four-wheel-drive truck produced by Berna (manufacturer of buses, trolleybuses and trucks), in Olten, Switzerland, from 1964 to 1976. They manufactured a total of 1600 units. Berna was acquired by Adolph Saurer AG in 1929. The Swiss Army used several specialized versions of the Berna 2VM, including dump trucks, snow plows, and aircraft refueling trucks. The largely identical Saurer 2DM was produced at Saurer's facility in Arbon. The Berna 2VM was also sold for civilian use.

One vehicle is on display at the Swiss Military Museum.
