= Berna L275/10 =

Berna L275/10, 4x4
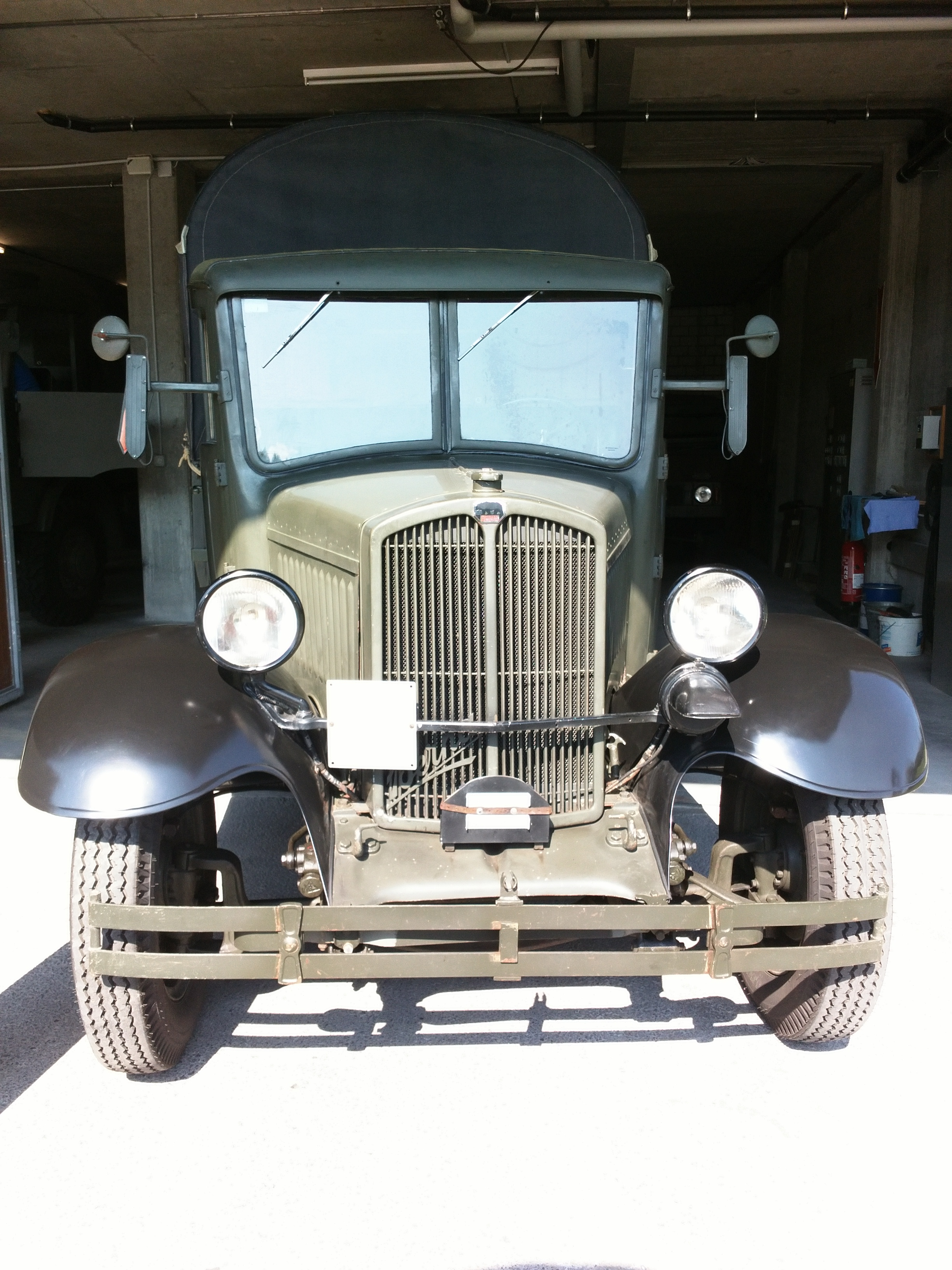
- Swiss Army Berna L275/10
- Place of origin: Switzerland

Service history
- In service: 1937 - 1966
- Used by: Switzerland

Production history
- Designer: Berna Olten
- Manufacturer: Berna
- Produced: 1937 -?
- Variants: Flatbed truck

Specifications
- Mass: 2900kg
- Length: 5,790 m
- Width: 2,000 m
- Height: 2,850 m
- Crew: 1+ 2Pax in cabin
- Engine: Berna 6 Cylinder 3600 cm³ 90 PS / 66 kW
- Payload capacity: 2900 kg
- Suspension: 4x4 wheeled
- Maximum speed: 65 km/h

The Berna L275/10 is a truck model manufactured by the Swiss company Berna from 1937 onwards. The Berna L275 / 10, military designation "Lastw gl 1.5t 4x2", (Lastw gl = Lastwagen geländegängig = offroad truck) has a total weight of 2200 kg, a structure with cabin and bridge as well as an on-board voltage of 6 V. The 6-cylinder petrol engine with 3600 cm³ produces a power of 66 kW (90 hp).

The Berna L275 / 10 were used until 1966 in the service of the Swiss Armed Forces. A Berna L275 / 10 truck is now in the de:Zuger Depot Technikgeschichte. Exactly this Berna L275/10 took part in the movie The Boat Is Full.
