= Panzer 58 =

Mittlerer Panzer 1958 (MPz58)
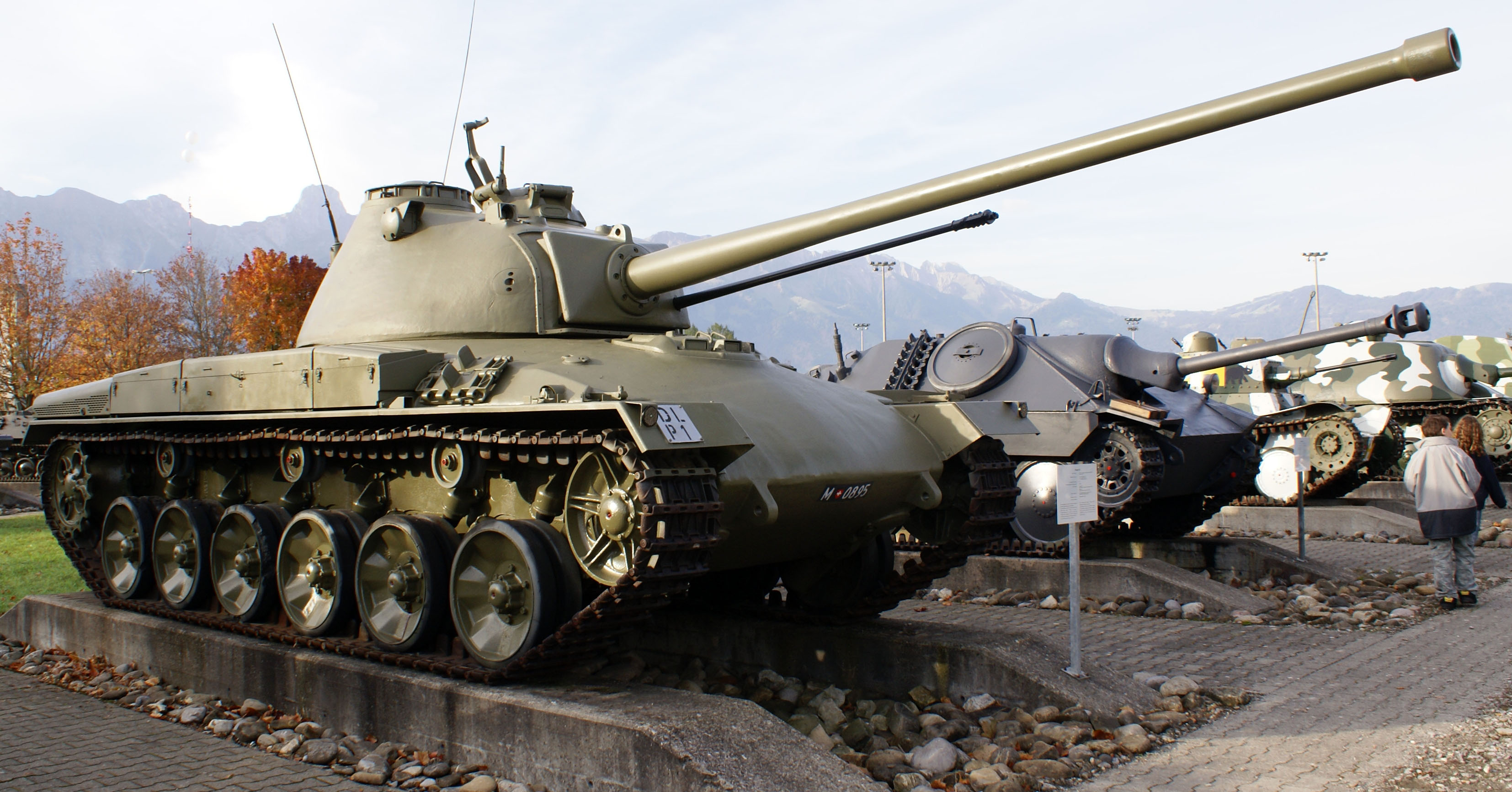
- Panzer 1958
- Type: Medium tank
- Place of origin: Switzerland

Service history
- In service: 1958–1964
- Used by: Switzerland
- Wars: none

Production history
- Designer: Eidgenoessische Konstruktionswerkstaette
- Designed: 1953
- Manufacturer: Eidgenoessische Konstruktionswerkstaette Thun
- Produced: 1957–1961
- No. built: 12 (all versions);
- Variants: 1st Prototype; 2nd Prototype; Production Model

Specifications
- Mass: 35.1 tonnes
- Length: 6.9 m (270 in), gun in driving mode: 8.49 m (334 in)
- Width: 3.06 m (120 in)
- Height: 2.85 m (112 in)
- Crew: 4
- Armour: Steel; Front: 60mm–80mm Sides: 30mm Rear: 20mm
- Main armament: 1st Prototype: 1x 90mm "Kanone 1948" domestic rifled gun 2nd Prototype: 1x Ordnance QF 20 pounder rifled gun Production Vehicles: 1x Panzerkanone 60, a licensed Royal Ordnance L7 105mm rifled gun with 44 rounds
- Secondary armament: 6x Nbw 51 80mm smoke grenade launchers with 2 rounds per tube 1st Prototype: 1x MG 51 7.5mm coaxial machine gun 1x MG 29 7.5mm machine gun with 3400 rounds Later Models: 1x Oerlikon 20mm coaxial Panzerkanone 61 autocannon with 240 rounds 1x 7.5mm MG 29 with 3400 rounds
- Engine: 8 cylinder V90° Mercedes Benz 837, 600 HP; Auxiliary 4 cylinder in-line Mercedes Benz OM 636, 38 HP
- Power/weight: 12.3 kW/T (17.1 HP/T)
- Transmission: Rear SLM
- Suspension: Rods with springs and hydraulic dampers
- Ground clearance: 1100 mm
- Fuel capacity: 640 Liters
- Operational range: on road 350 km (220 mi), off-road 160 km (99 mi)
- Maximum speed: on road 55 km/h (34 mph), off-road 30 km/h (19 mph)

The Mittlerer Panzer 1958 or Panzer 58 was a medium tank of Swiss design. Twelve tanks were produced and later converted to Panzer 61s.

== History and development ==
After World War II, Switzerland was only equipped with outdated fighting vehicles of foreign production such as the Hetzer. Switzerland sought to purchase new armored fighting vehicles but was unable to do so due to other nations' involvement in the Korean War. Thus, in 1953 funding was allocated for the development of a domestic medium tank. The first prototype was completed by Eidgenoessische Konstruktionswerkstaette in 1957 and was designated as Panzer 58. The main armament of the first prototype was a domestic 90 mm cannon. A second prototype was equipped with a British Ordnance QF 20 pounder. Another ten tanks armed with the 105 mm cannon were manufactured from 1960 to 1961.

== Vehicle systems ==
The drive unit was compact and modular and thus could be installed as a unit easily. It consisted of the motor, auxiliary motor, drive and steering gear, power transmission and radiator. The auxiliary engine was a four-cylinder diesel engine and was used to drive the main generator and the power supply. In case of a problem with the main motor, the tank could be driven with the auxiliary engine via the auxiliary transmission, over short distances. The transmission was an SLM with 6 forward and 2 reverse gears. The foot brake and parking brake consisted of two brake bands on the left and right sides of the gearbox. The turret was located in the center of the tank.

== Crew ==
The crew of the Panzer 58 consisted of a Commander, Driver, Loader, and Gunner.

== Use ==
Between 1958 and 1964 the Panzer 58 was in service with the Swiss Army. Eventually, the vehicles were converted to and used as the Panzer 61.

== Legacy ==
The lessons learned with the Panzer 58 project were the basis of the Panzer 61. This project served in the development of Switzerland's armored doctrine throughout the cold war and into the modern day; even modern Swiss Leopard 2 tanks are modified to conform to the unique demands of Switzerland that were born to a large extent from the Panzer 58 project.

== Surviving examples ==
The prototype with the M plate No. M0895 is on display at the Panzermuseum Thun in Thun, Switzerland.
