= Nahkampfkanone 1 =

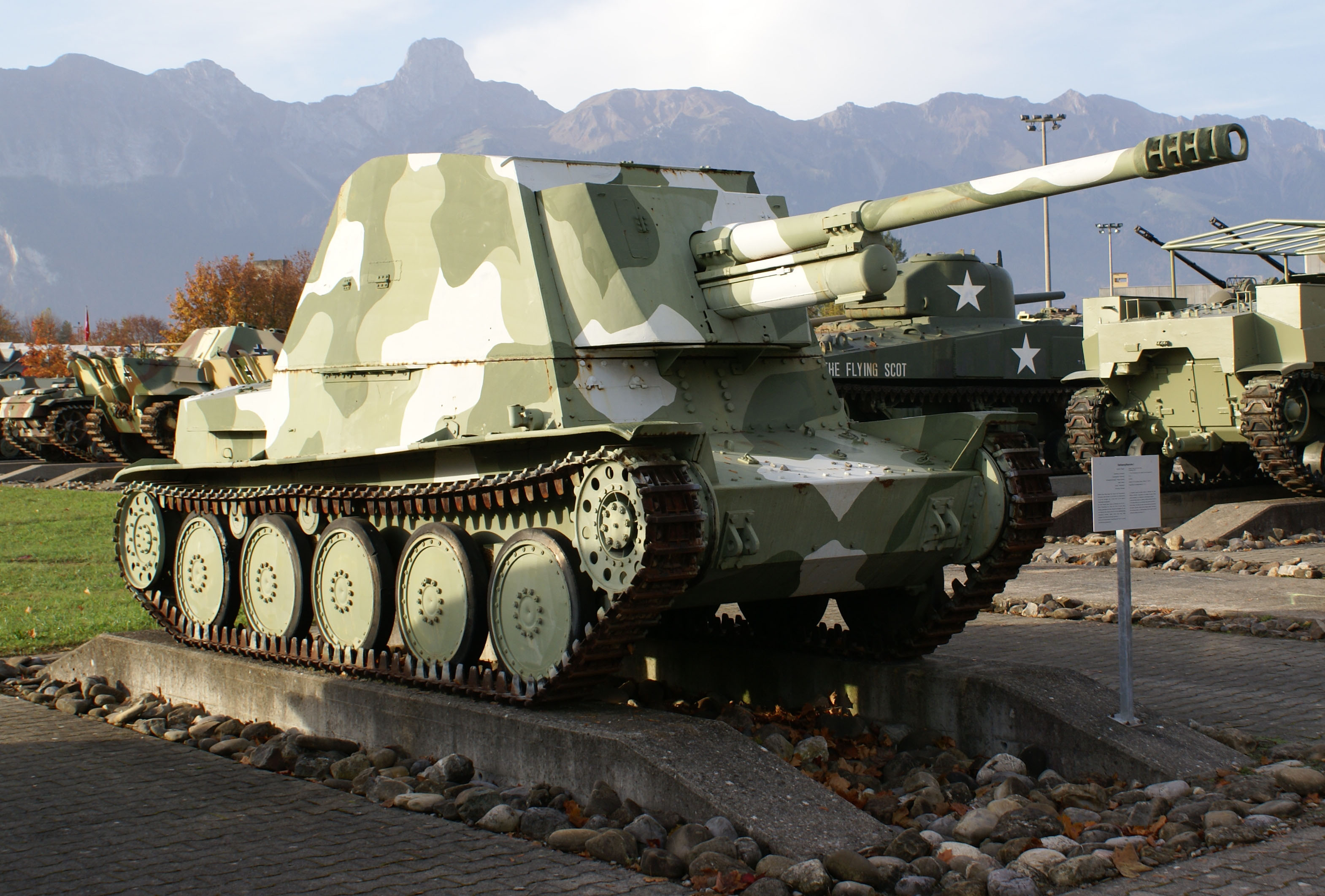
- Nahkampfkanone I at Panzermuseum Thun
- Type: Light tank destroyer
- Place of origin: Switzerland

Service history
- In service: 1944–1947
- Used by: Switzerland

Production history
- Designed: 1943
- Manufacturer: Berna at Olten & Saurer
- No. built: 1

Specifications
- Mass: 12.5 tonnes
- Length: 6.45 m (21 ft 2 in)
- Width: 2.60 m (8 ft 6 in)
- Height: 2.50 m (8 ft 2 in)
- Crew: 5
- Armour: 50 mm
- Main armament: 75 mm cannon later 10.5 cm howitzer
- Engine: 6-cylinder gasoline engine four-stroke Saurer CT1D; 123 hp (92 kW)
- Power/weight: 9.8 hp/tonne
- Suspension: leaf spring
- Operational range: 200 km (120 mi); 120 km off-road
- Maximum speed: 45 km/h (28 mph) off-road:25 km/h (16 mph)

The Nahkampfkanone 1 was an experimental Swiss tank destroyer that saw service between 1944 and 1947. Only one was ever built.

== History and development ==
The designed heralded from early experiments made between 1943 and 1944 in Switzerland in the design and construction of an armoured vehicle. The Nahkampf cannon 1 was built onto the chassis of the armoured car Panzerwagen 39, Panzer 38(t) type LTL-H CSSR armoured fighting vehicle. The chassis was extended by a roller produced by the company Berna in Olten. Since only a few parts were available, it was partially constructed using parts of armoured cars, mainly the chassis and transmissions. The armour consisted of only thin sheet metal and, in initial experiments, only a 75-millimeter cannon was installed, before future designs sported a 10.5-cm howitzer. The prototype was used by the Swiss Army with the car plate (M + number 7236).

== See also ==
- Nahkampfkanone 2
