= Berna =

Swiss manufacturer of buses, trolleys, etc

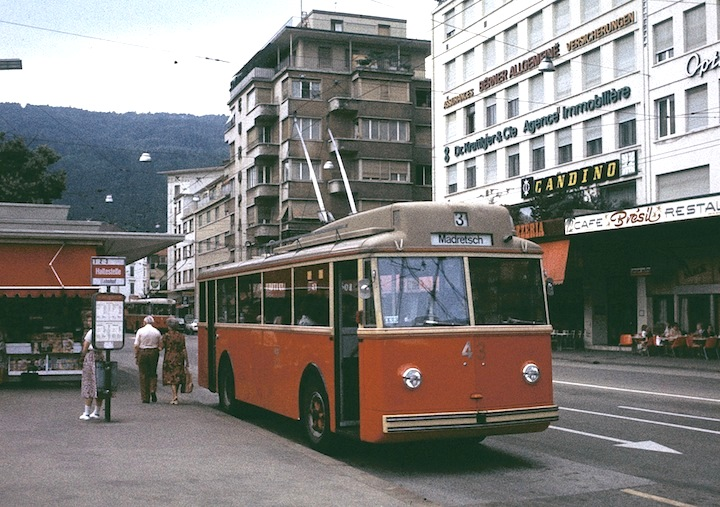
A 1951 Berna trolleybus in service in Biel/Bienne in 1979

Berna was a Swiss manufacturer of buses, trolleybuses and trucks, which later also specialized in surface metallurgical treatments and components. Until the 1960s it was primarily a vehicle manufacturer, but between 1965 and 1978 vehicle manufacturing was phased out and replaced with other products. The company was based in Olten.

== History ==
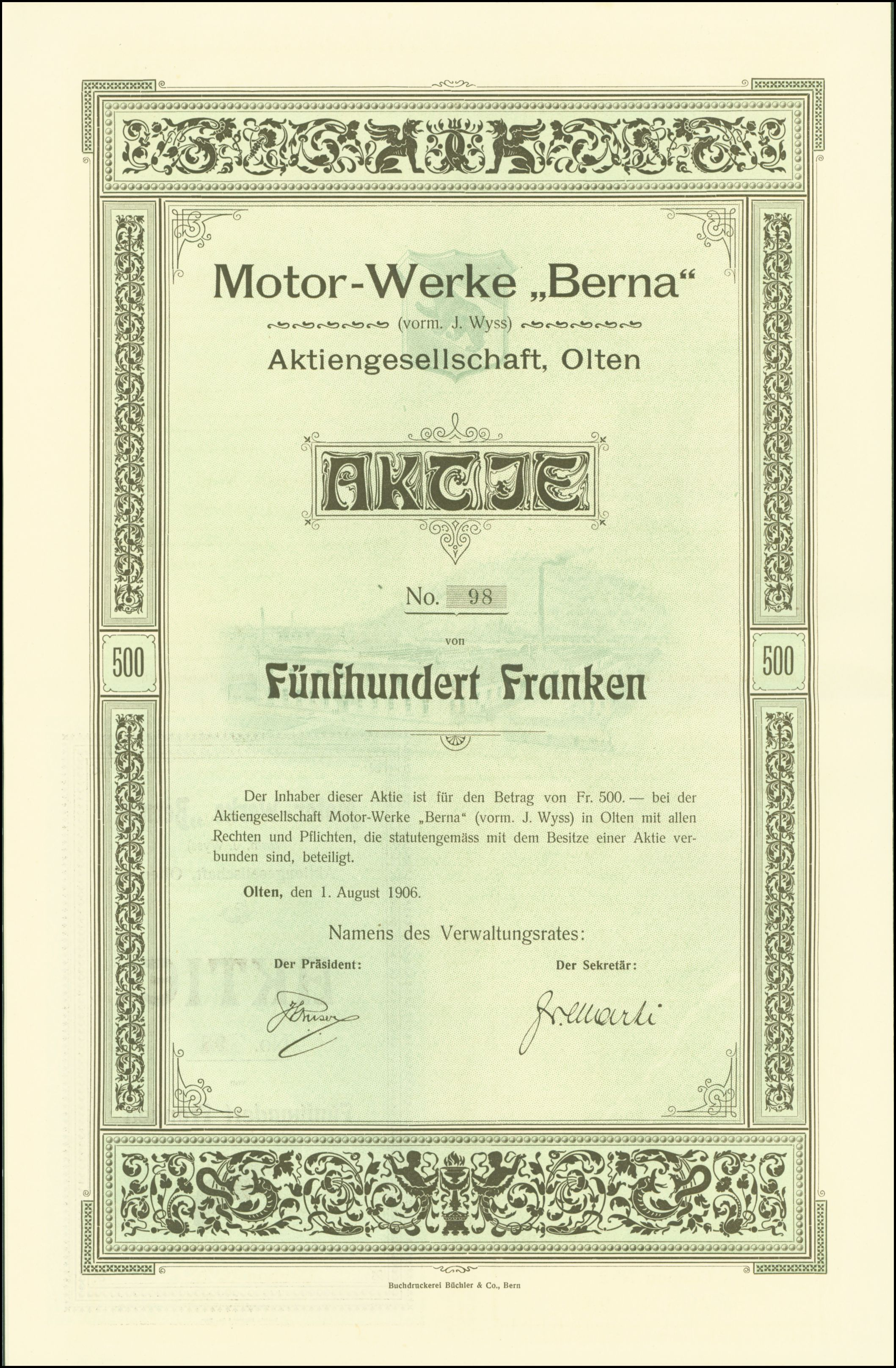
Share of the Motor-Werke Berna, issued 1. August 1906

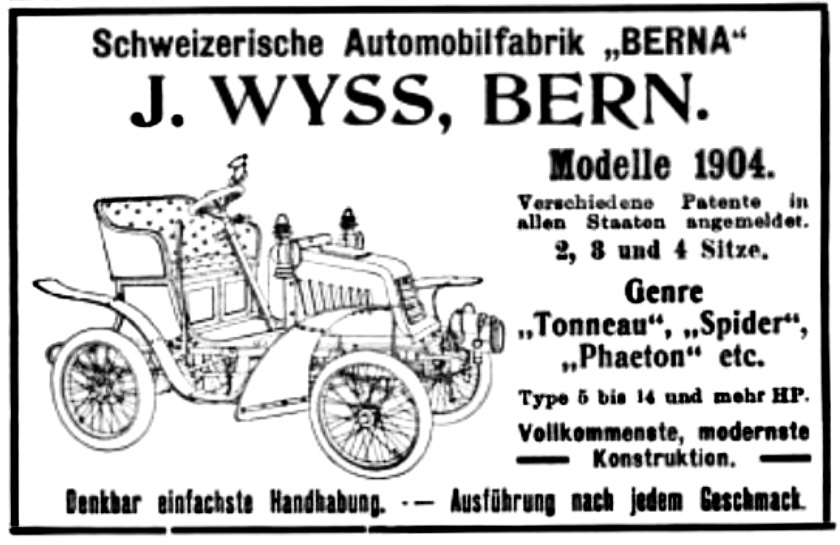
Berna advertisement (1904)

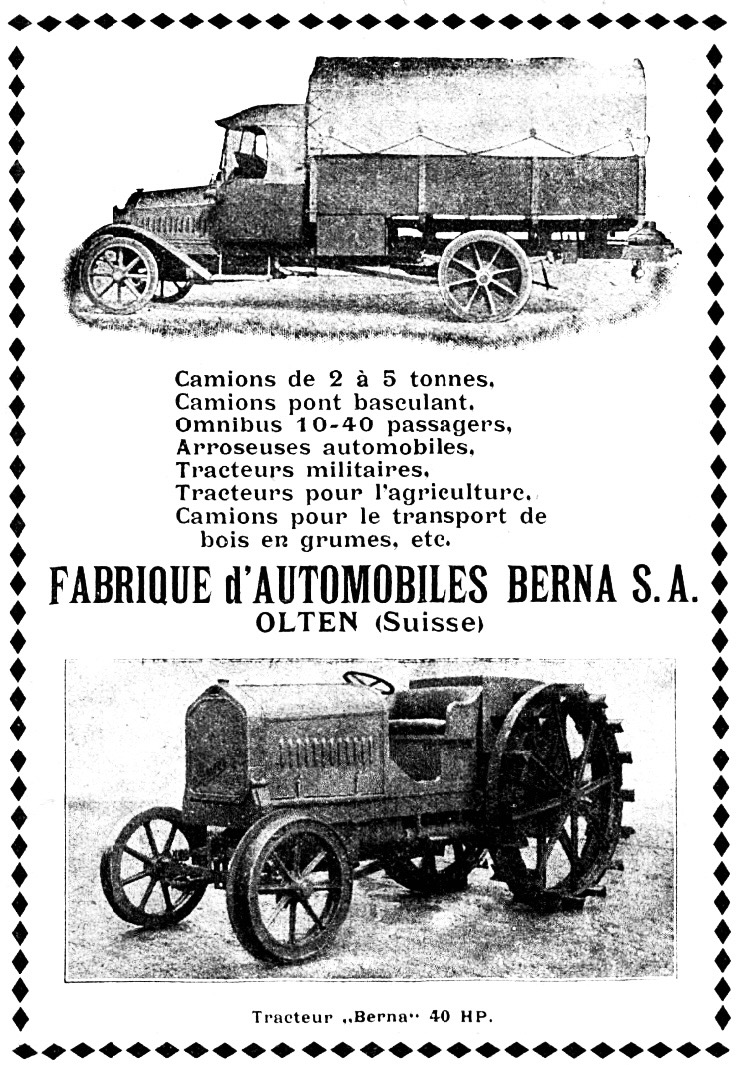
Berna advertisement (1919) Tractor 40 hp

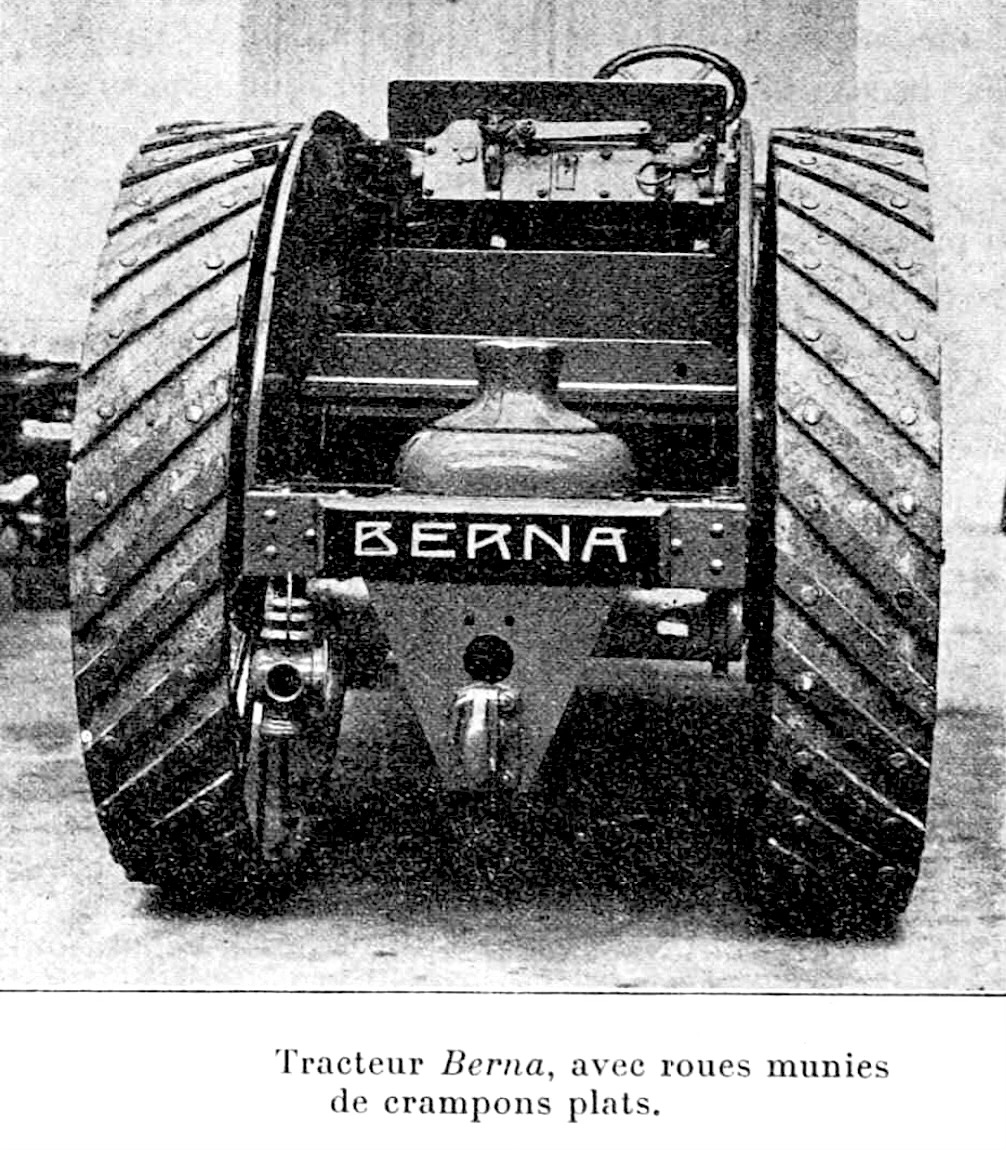
Berna Tractor 6648 cc (1918)

The company was founded in 1902 by Joseph Wyss and changed its name from Schweizerische Automobil Fabrik Berna (S.A.F.B.) to Motor-Werke Berna AG in 1906. The company initially manufactured cars, and Wyss was its first car designer. Berna was also involved in the development of the Tank "Nahkampfkanone 1" Berna's first car, made in 1902, was the Berna Vis-à-Vis Idéal. Another model was powered by one-cylinder engines, which were placed on the rear. In 1903, a new car called the Unicum was produced with the engine placed on the front and the back wheels were powered by chains. By 1905, Berna was also building trucks/lorries.

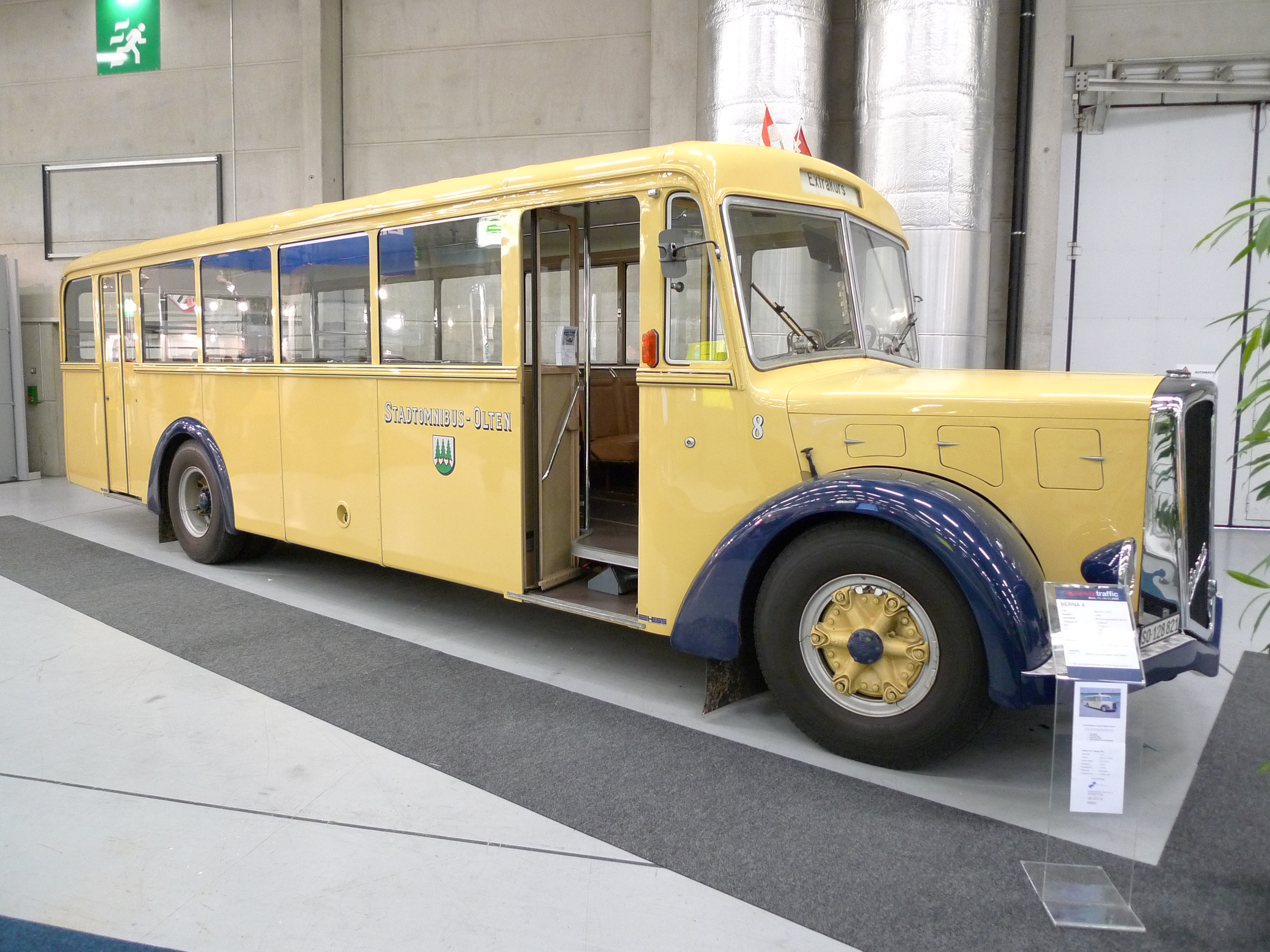
A Berna 4 UPO autobus of 1946.

In 1907, Wyss sold the company to a businessman named Locher, who eventually went bankrupt. The company came under English control in 1908, and production of cars ceased, but it was bought back by Swiss shareholders in 1912, and reorganized as Motorwagenfabrik Berna AG (Berna Motor Vehicle Factory). In 1929, following a period of financial difficulties, Saurer acquired majority control of Berna. Manufacturing of trucks, like the Berna 2, Berna L275/10, Berna 2VM, Berna 2 US and buses continued, including trolleybuses starting in 1940.

In 1965, Berna branched out into metallurgy with two new subsidiaries in the United States and Germany, selling the metal treatment product "Bernex". Vehicle manufacturing was taken over entirely by Saurer in 1976, and Berna AG became a wholly owned subsidiary of Saurer. In 1978 the company had 650 employees and realized 55 million CHF in sales. In 1995, Berna AG had 160 employees and 45 million CHF in sales. In 2003, the Saurer Group sold the company, which had gradually separated into two divisions with different specialties, and the sale resulted in the establishment of two new but affiliated companies, Bernex Bimetall AG and IonBond AG Olten, both still sharing the same site in Olten.

== Trolleybuses ==
Production of trolleybuses lasted from 1940 to 1967 and included both two-axle and articulated vehicles. All were sold to Swiss transit systems. Although the total number made was only 131, they were purchased by seven of the country's 15 different urban trolleybus operators, or approximately half of all urban Swiss trolleybus systems existing during the period. A few 1965–66 Berna trolleybuses were still in passenger service in 2010 in Valparaíso, Chile, whose trolleybus operating company bought them secondhand from Geneva and Schaffhausen when they were withdrawn from service there in 1992.

== Gallery Berna vehicles ==
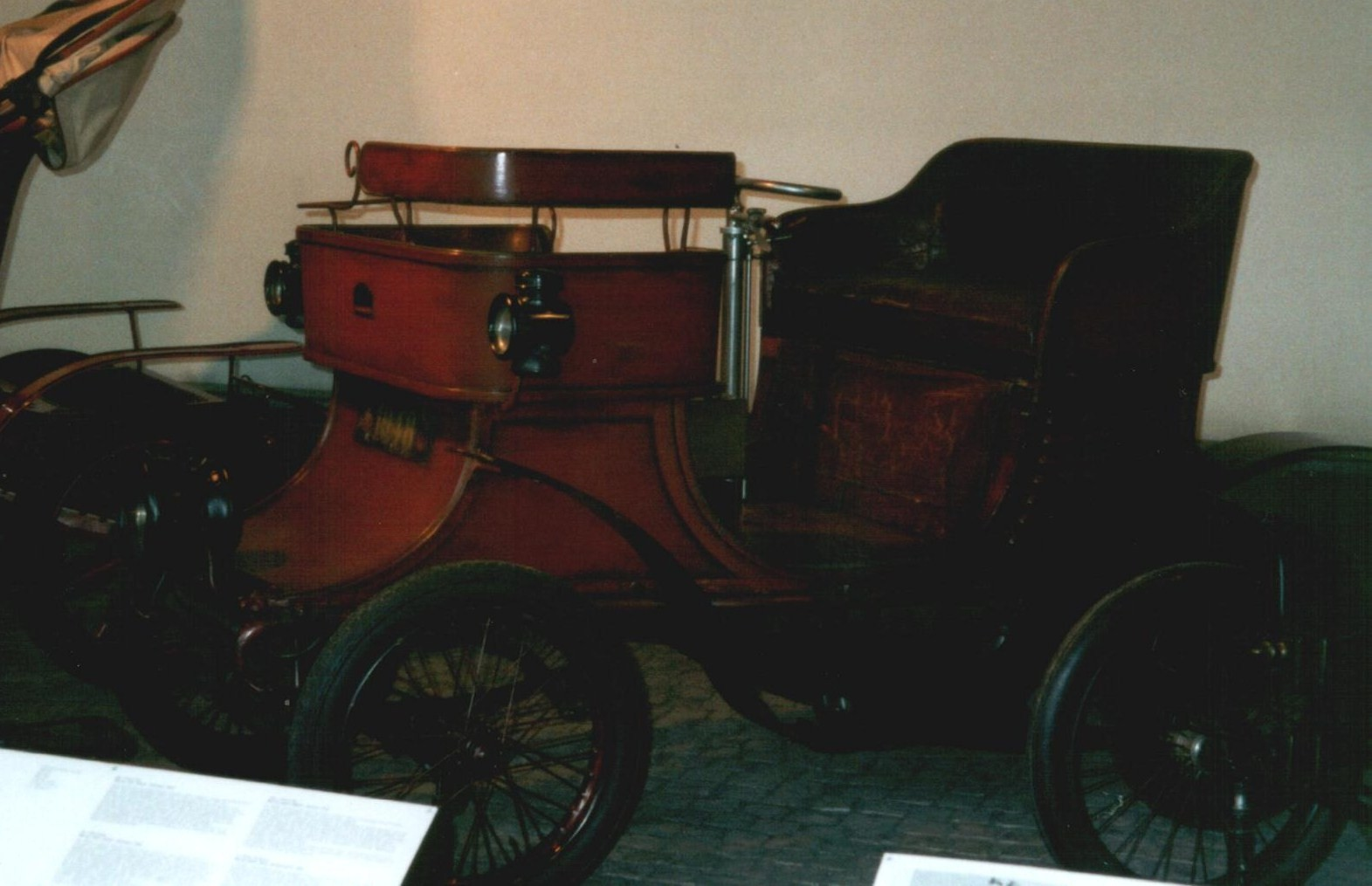
Berna-Automobil 1902

Berna Traktor in World War 1

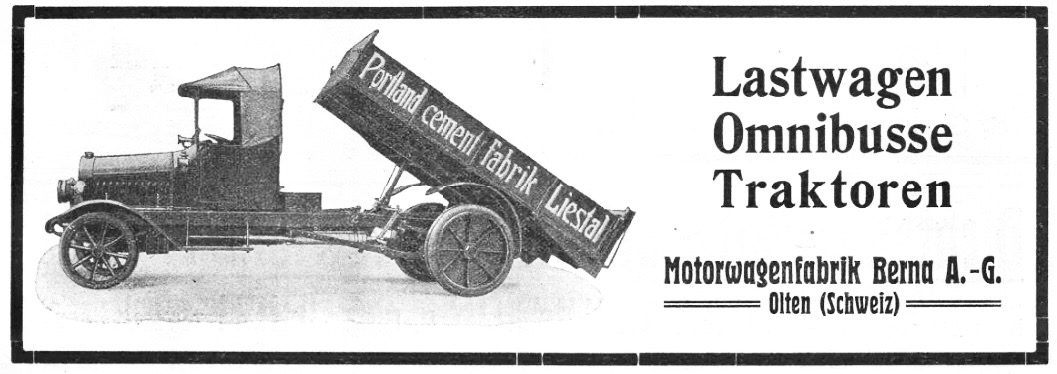
Berna truck 1919

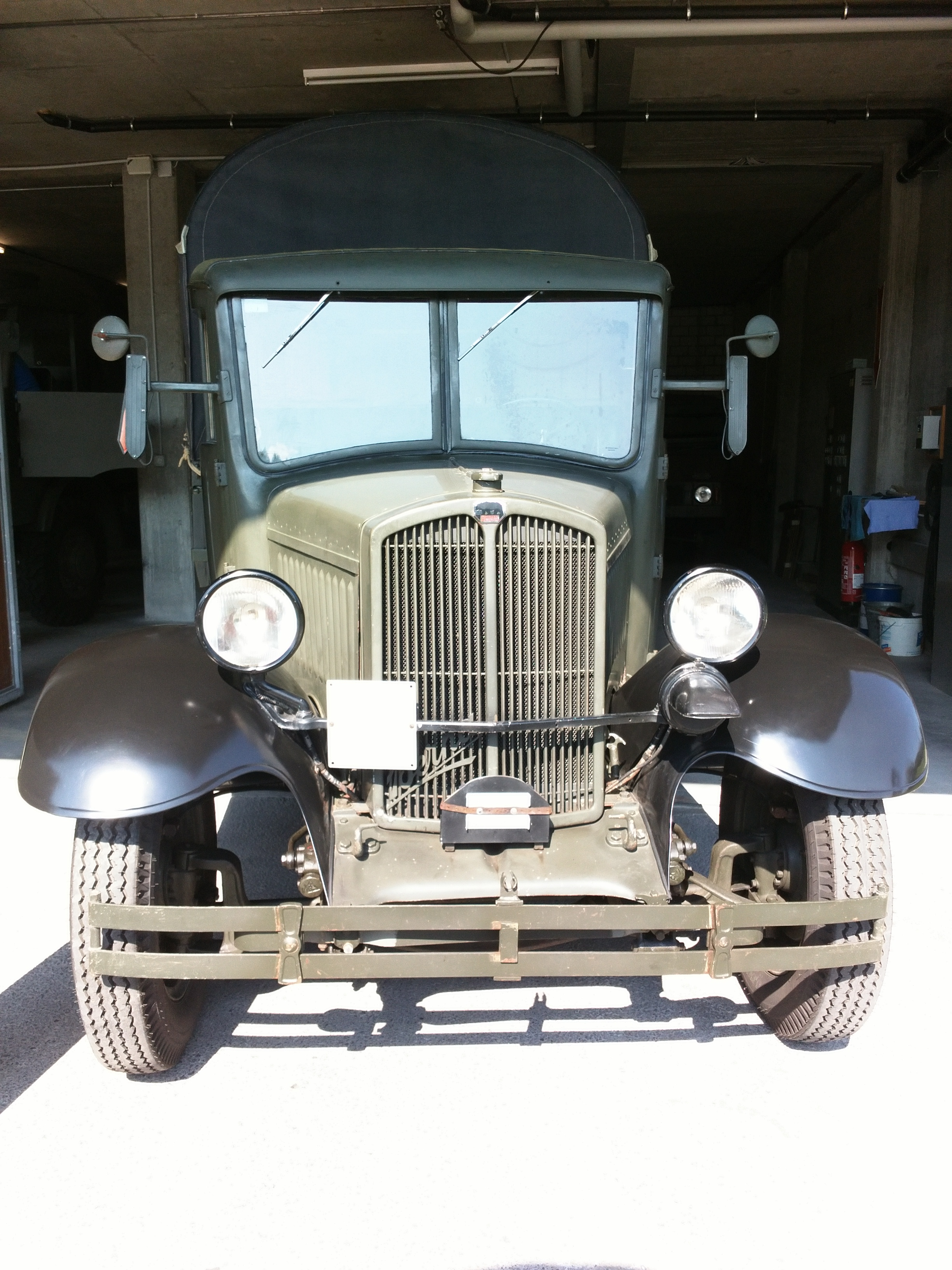
Berna L275/10

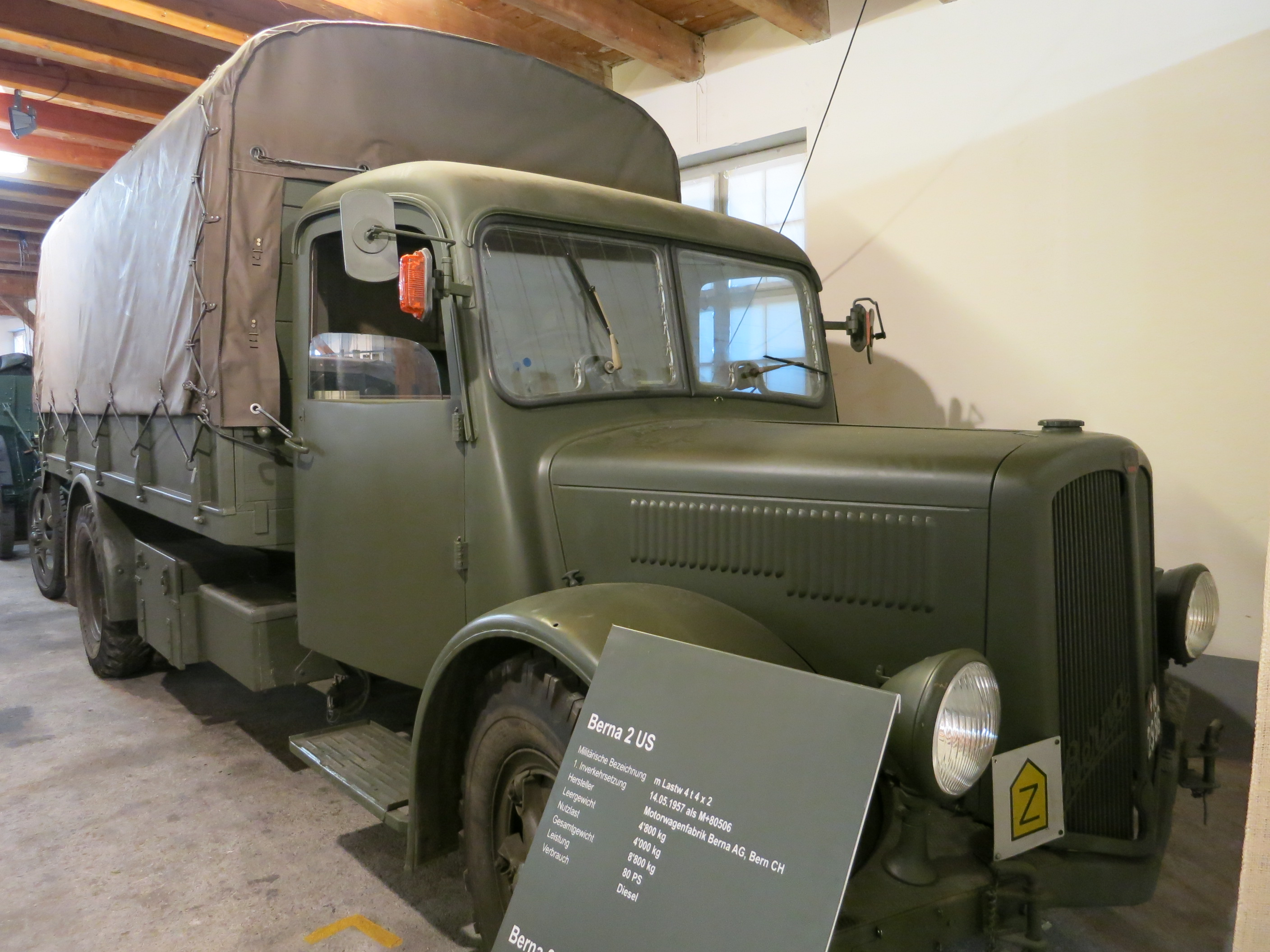
Berna 2 US

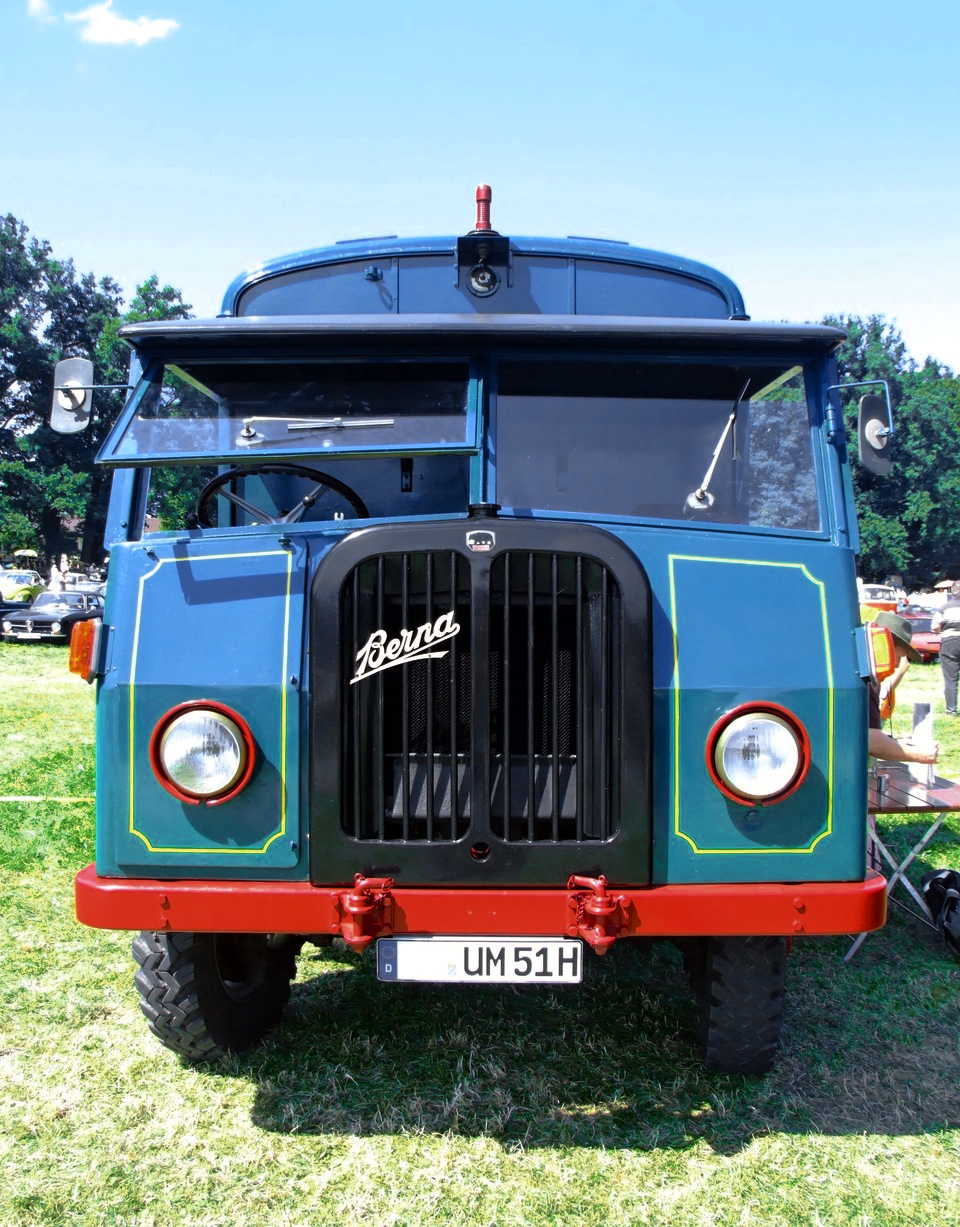
Berna Swiss Army radiotruck Berna 2, 1951

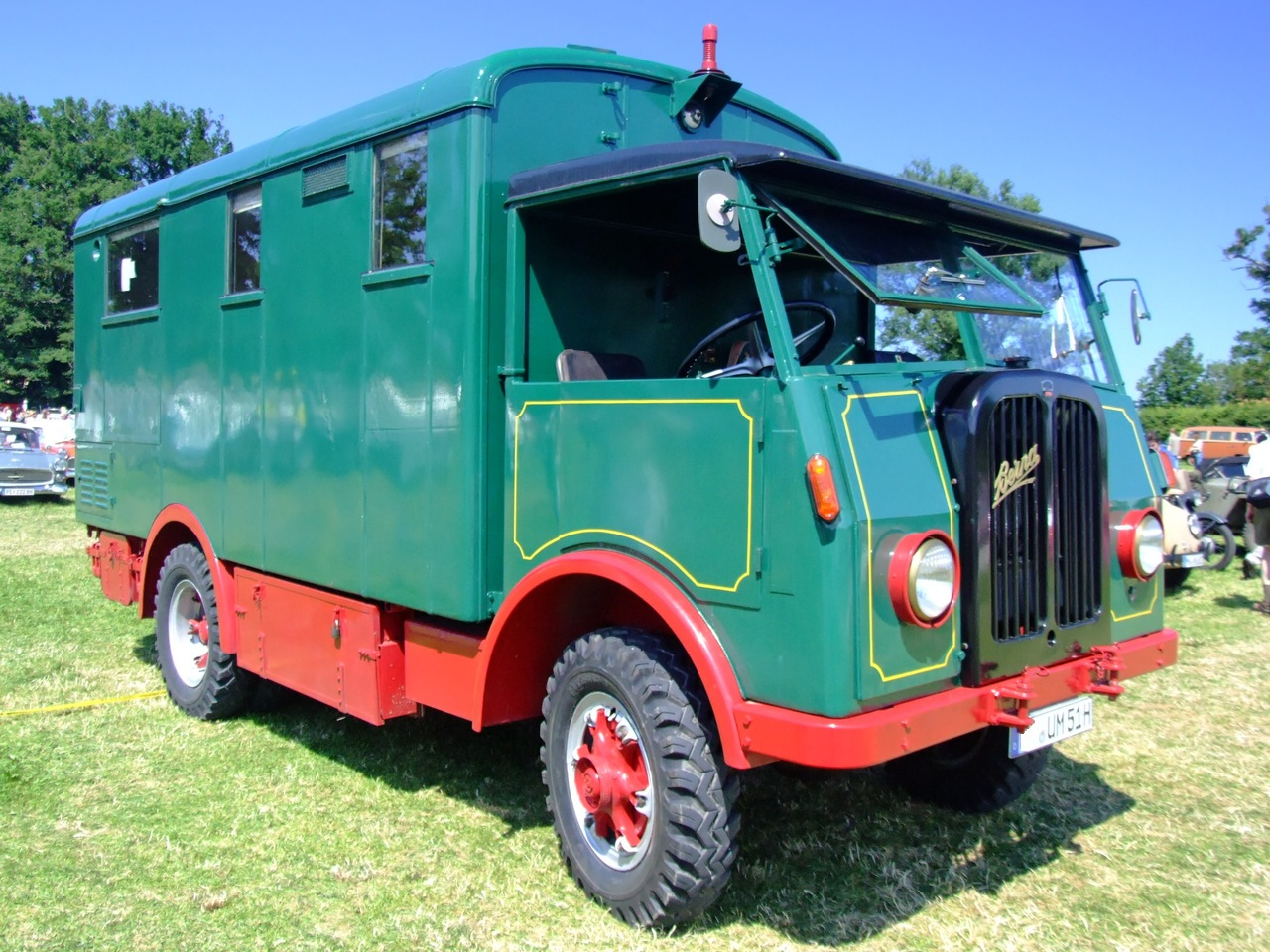
Berna Swiss Army radiotruck, 1951

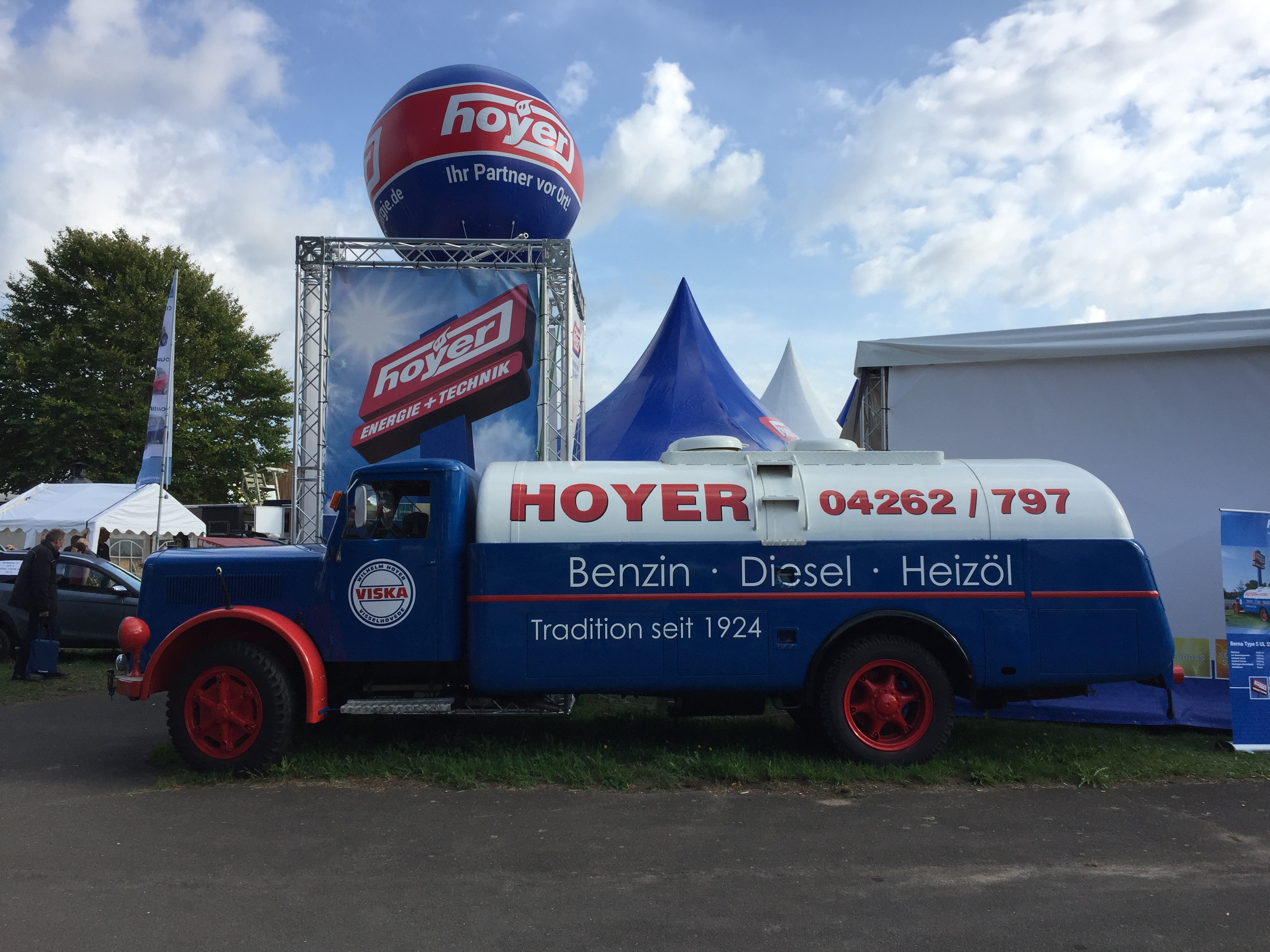
Berna fueltruck 1958

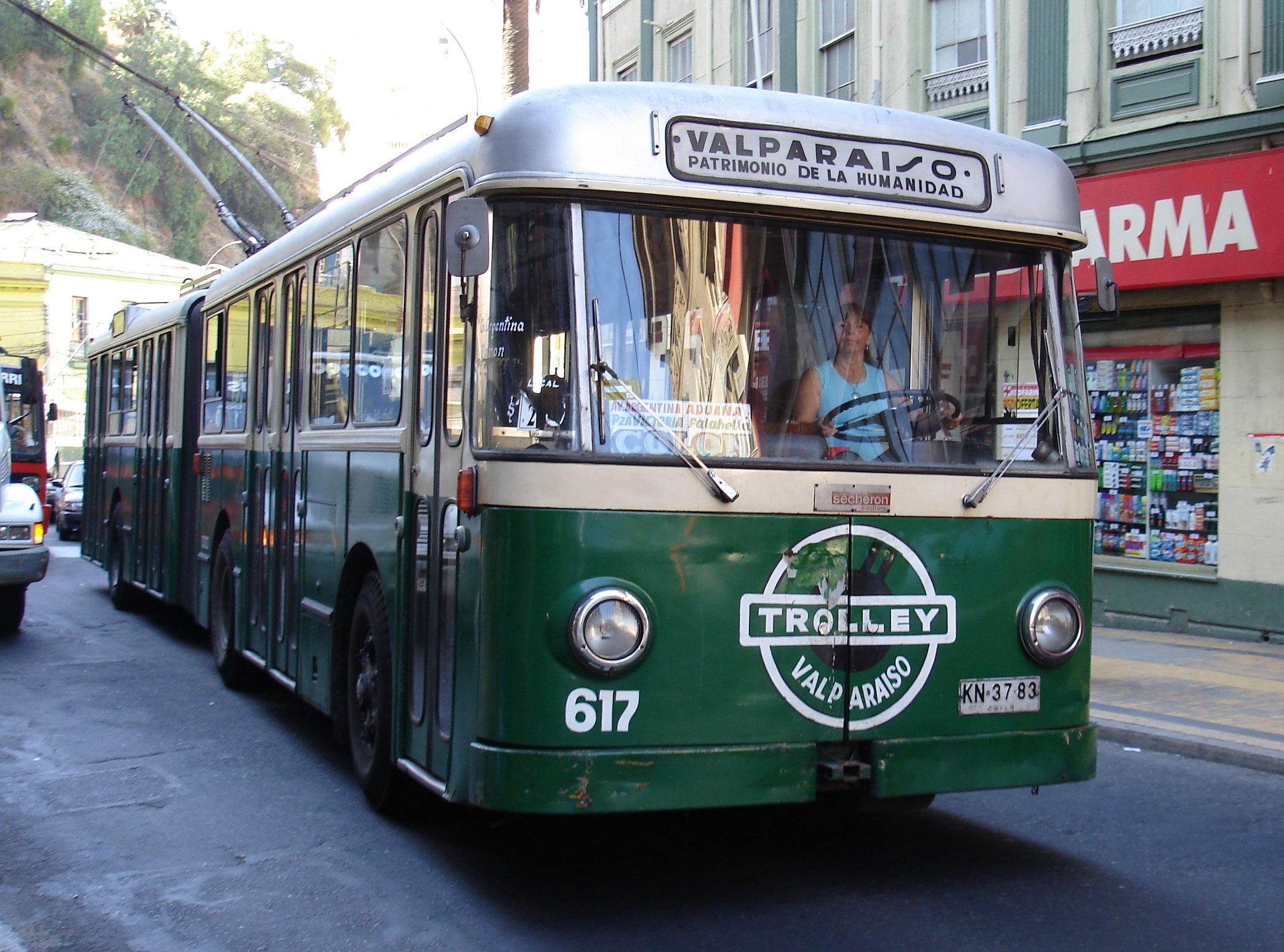
Berna-Trolleybus 4 GTP

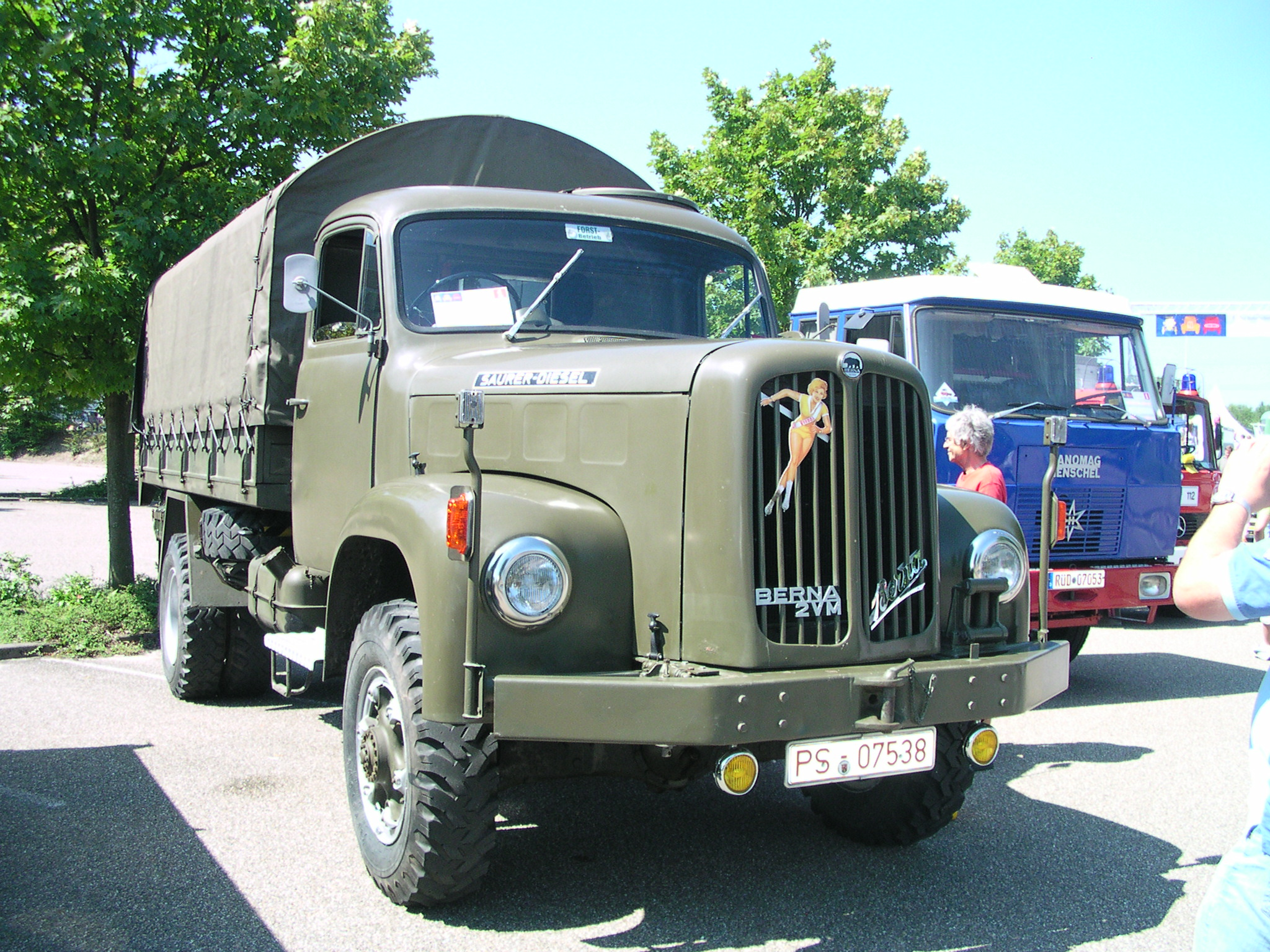
Armytruck Berna 2VM, 1967

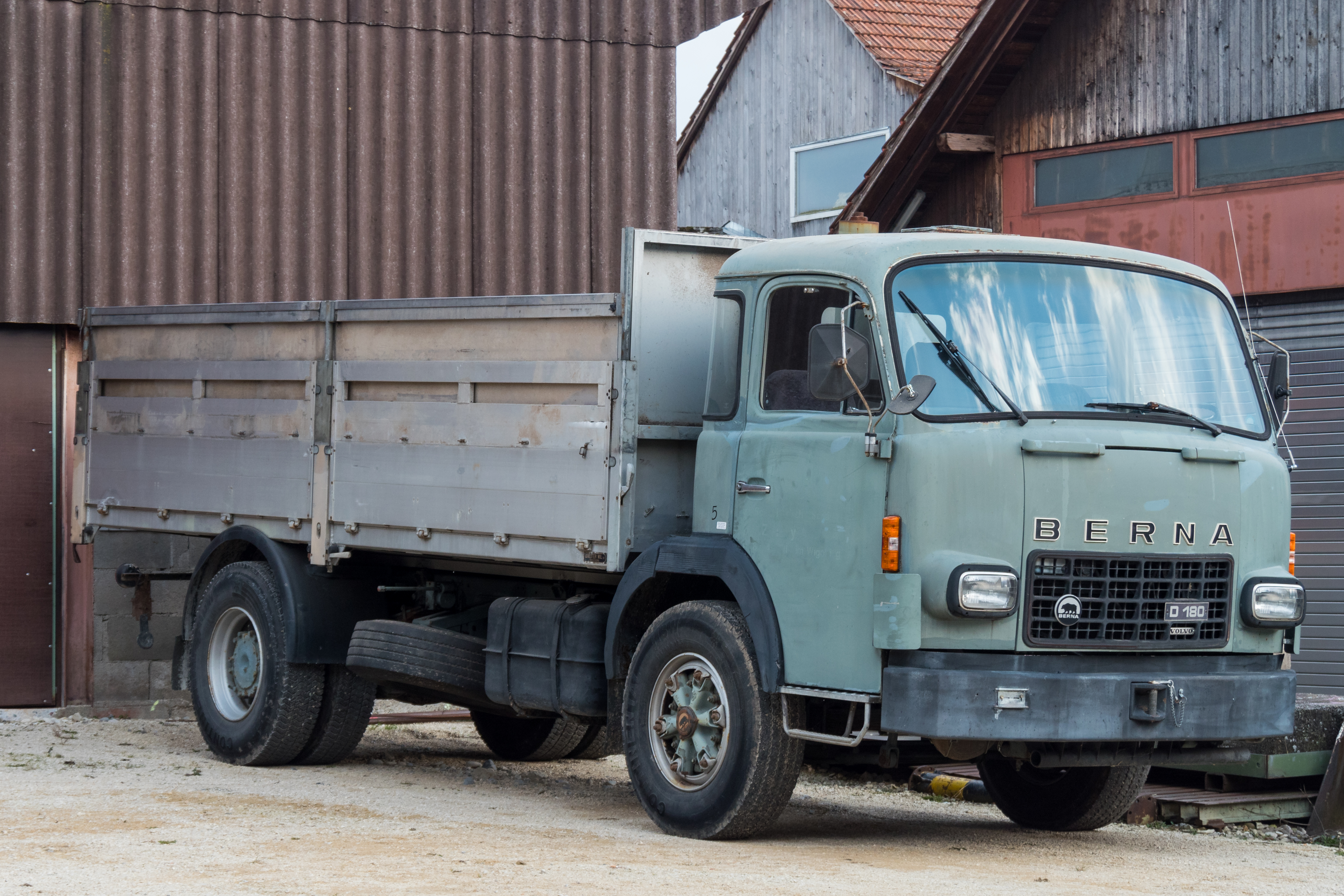
Berna D180

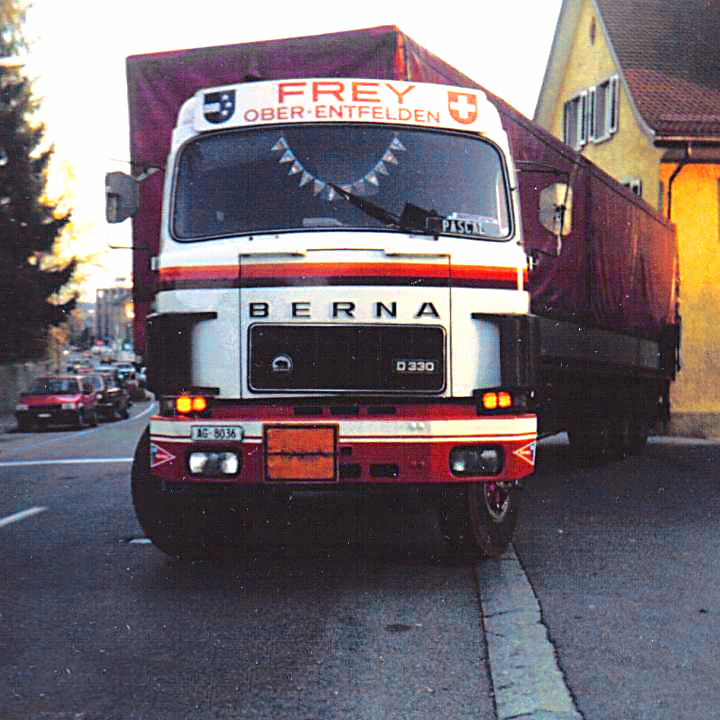
Berna D330

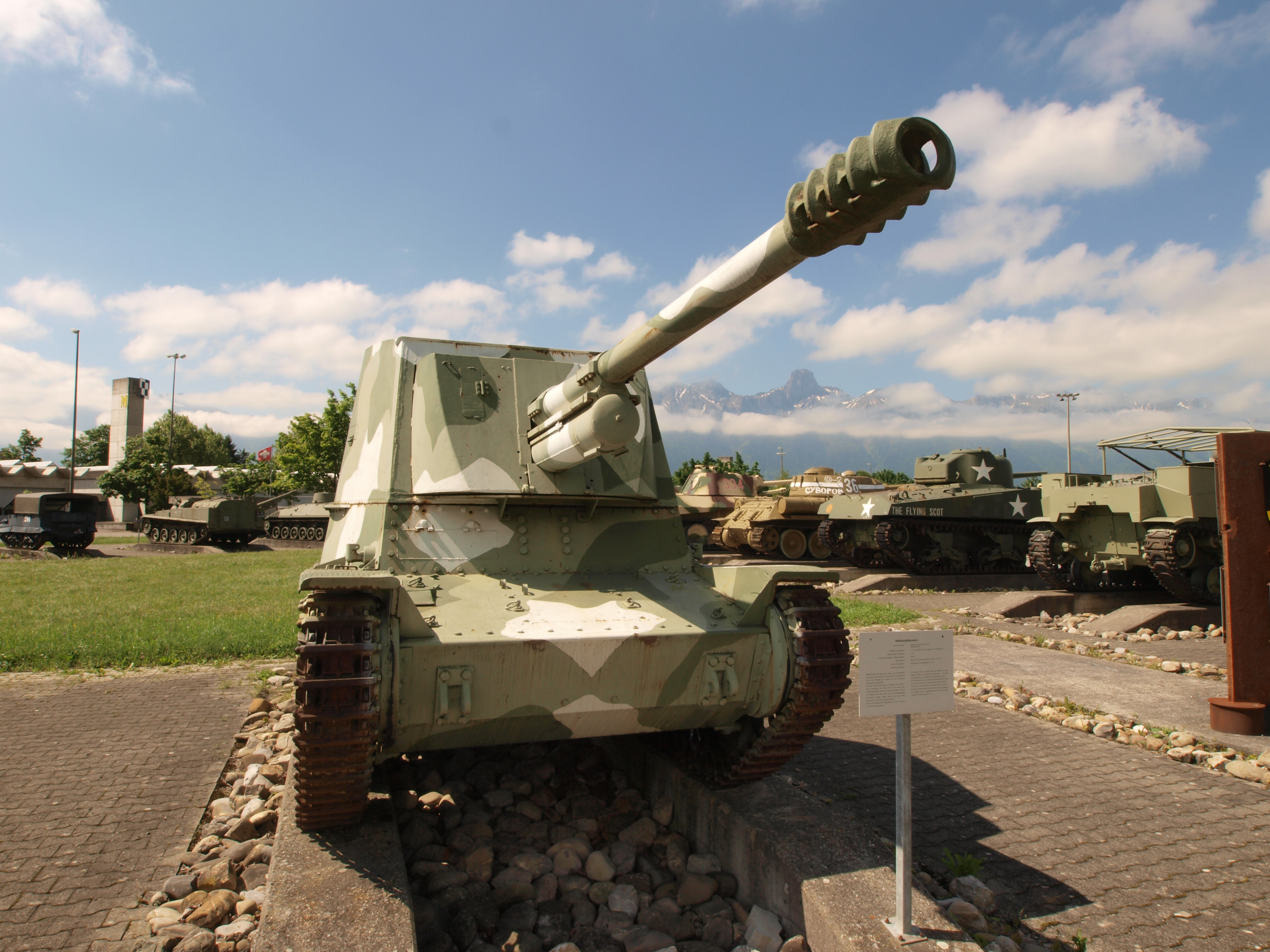
Nahkampfkanone 1

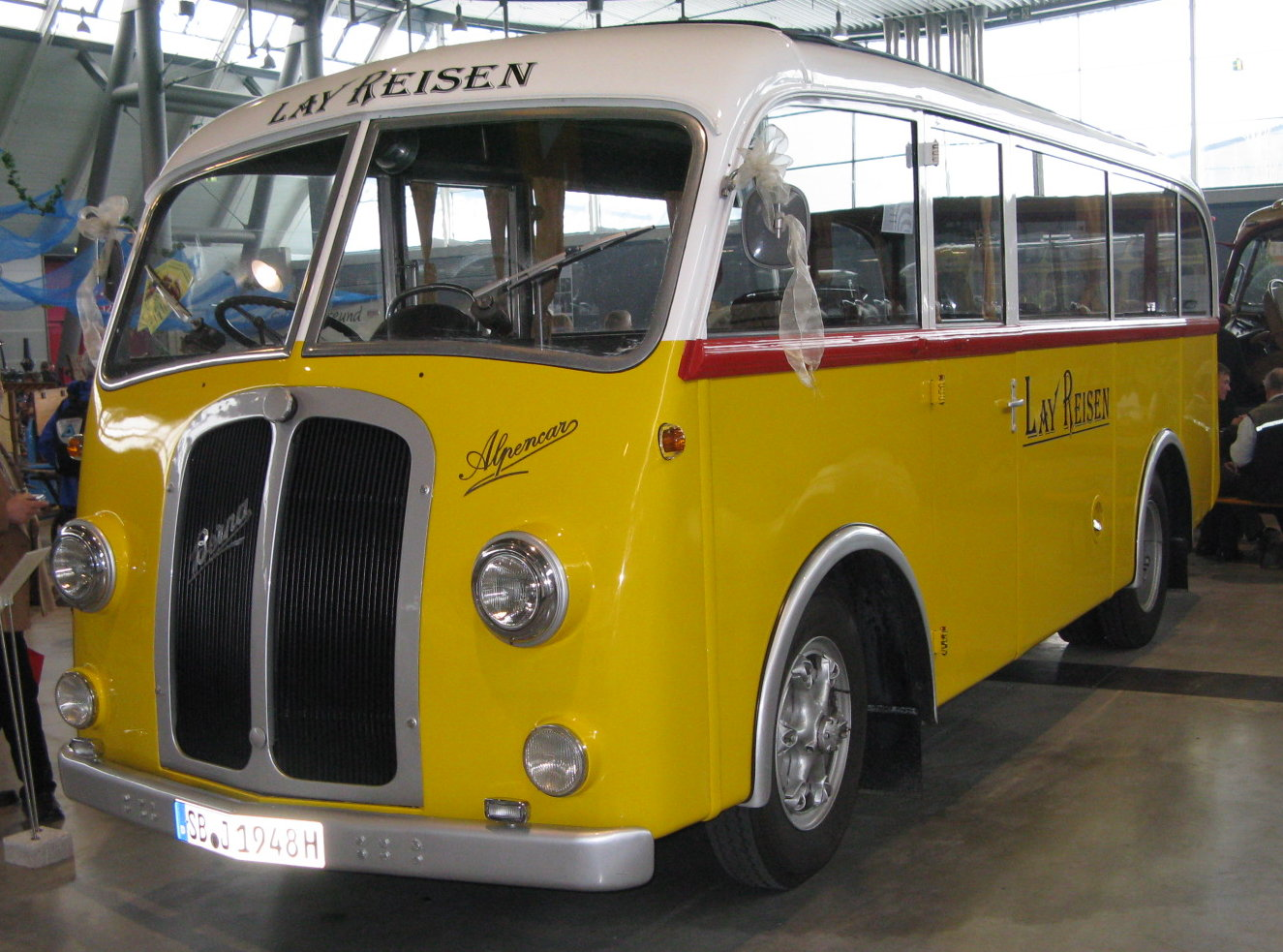
Berna Alpencar in 1948

== Sales ==
Year	1908	1909	1910	1911	1912	1913	1914	1915	1916	1917	1918
	17	25	38	56	90	121	(108)			315	263
