= Nahkampfkanone 2 =

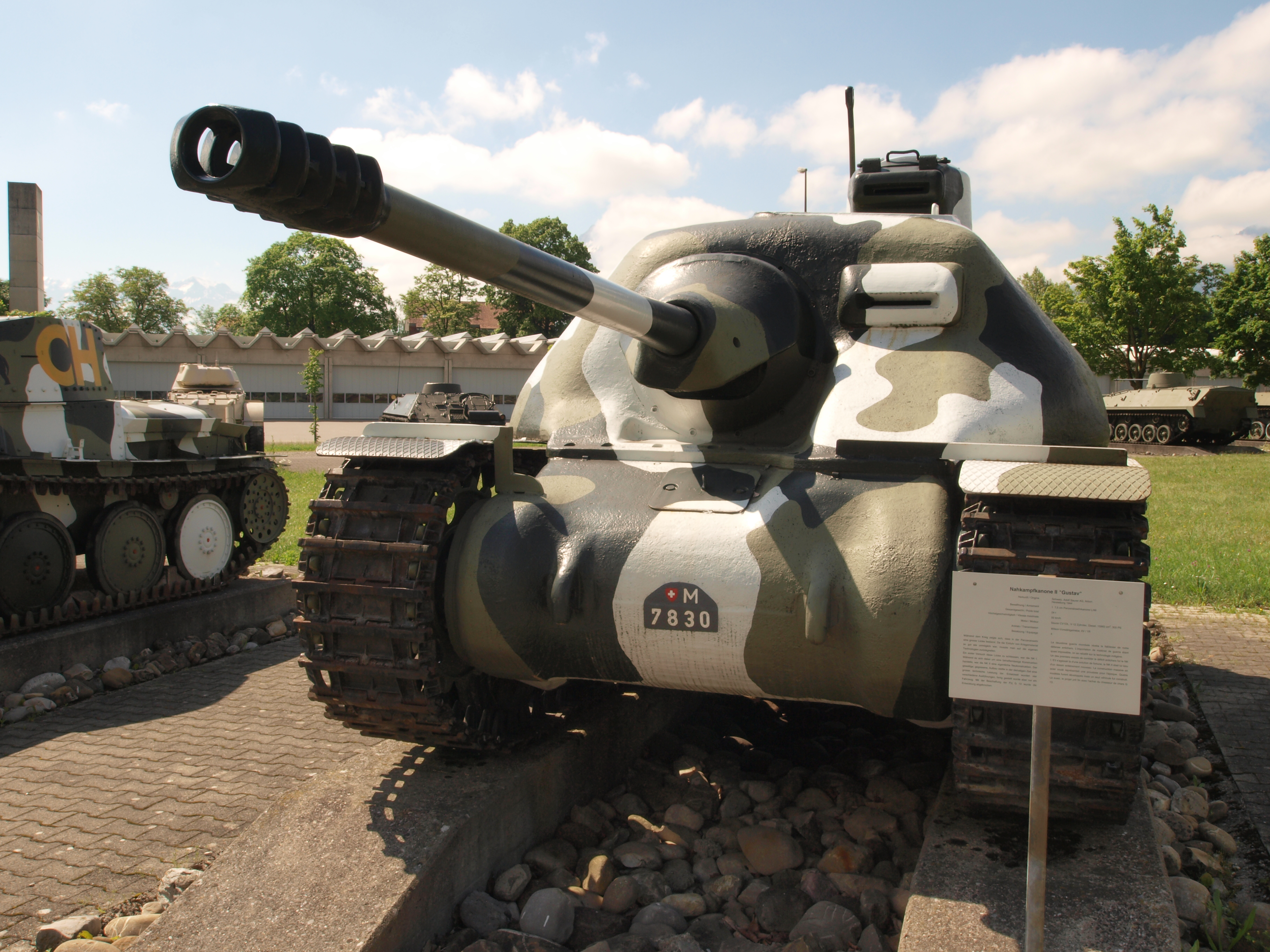
- Nahkampfkanone 2 at Panzermuseum Thun
- Type: light tank destroyer
- Place of origin: Switzerland

Service history
- In service: 1946 - 1947
- Used by: Switzerland

Production history
- Designed: 1946
- Manufacturer: Georg Fischer, Berna at Olten & Saurer
- No. built: 1
- Variants: A1, A2, B1, B2

Specifications
- Mass: 24 tonnes
- Length: 5.24 m (17 ft 2 in)
- Width: 2.85 m (9 ft 4 in)
- Height: 2.15 m (7 ft 1 in)
- Crew: 5
- Armour: 80 mm
- Main armament: L/49 75mm Pak with 45 rounds
- Engine: 90° V12 cylinder four-stroke Saurer CV1DL; 280 hp
- Suspension: leaf springs
- Maximum speed: 50 km/h (31 mph) off-road:25 km/h (16 mph)

Nahkampfkanone 2 is a prototype tank destroyer of Swiss design.

== History and development ==
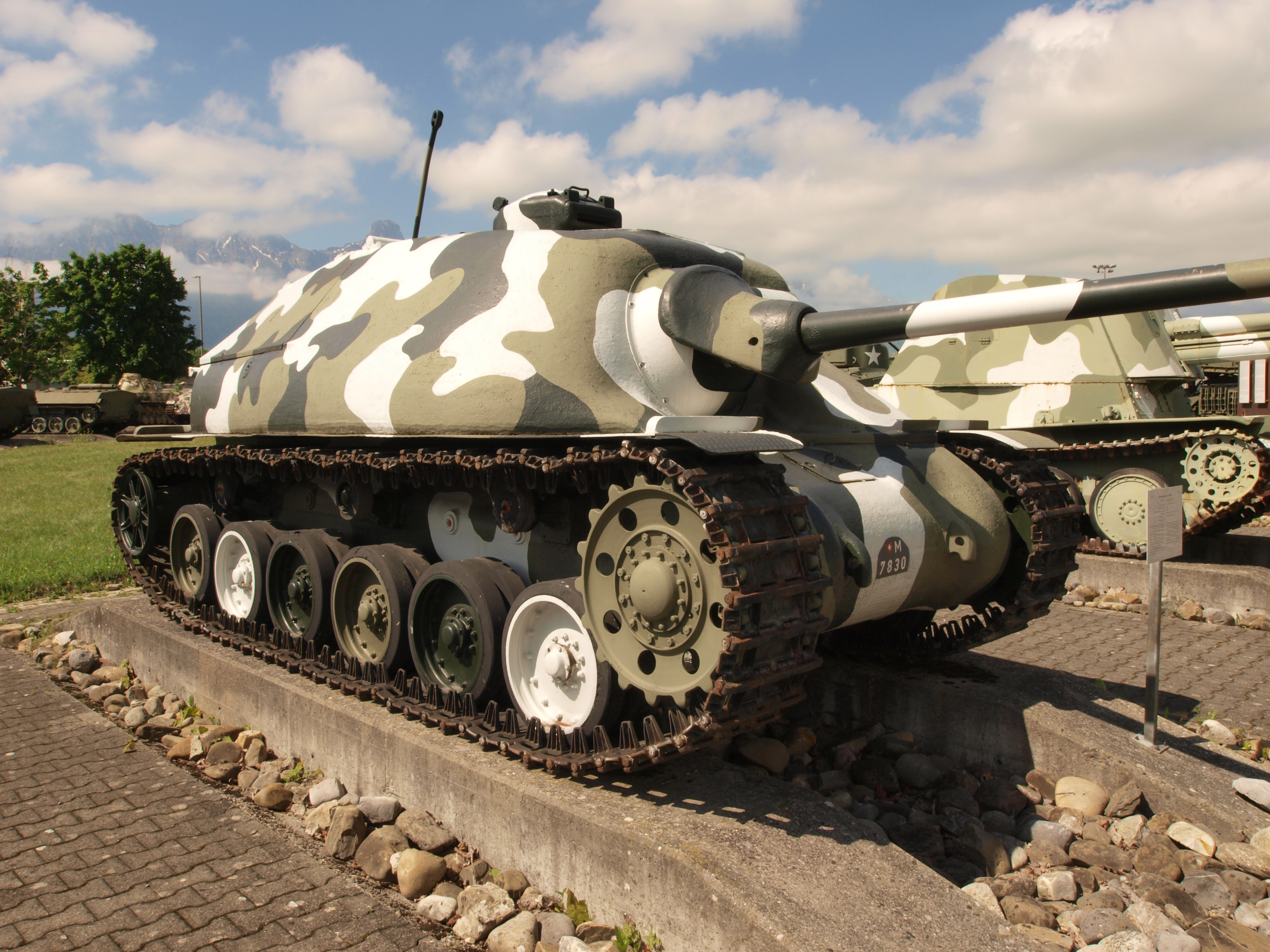

The hull and the superstructure were made of cast steel by the Georg Fischer AG. The construction of the chassis was by Saurer in Arbon, the assembly of the chassis at Berna in Olten and the design and installation of the gun of the K + W in Thun. Driver, commander and the horizontal gunner sat side left, right vertical gunner and loader. The gun was mounted in a hull based superstructure and had only a limited traverse arc, so the entire vehicle had to be turned onto the target before the gun itself could be aimed. The gun barrel could be retracted for travel.

Four different types (A1, A2, B1, B2) were planned, but one prototype was made and that did not see service; only driving tests were made in Thun from 1946 to 1947 for testing in troop deployment. Development was stopped in 1947.

The prototype is on display at the tank museum in Thun.

== See also ==
- Nahkampfkanone 1
