= Bi-articulated bus =

Bus formed of three sections

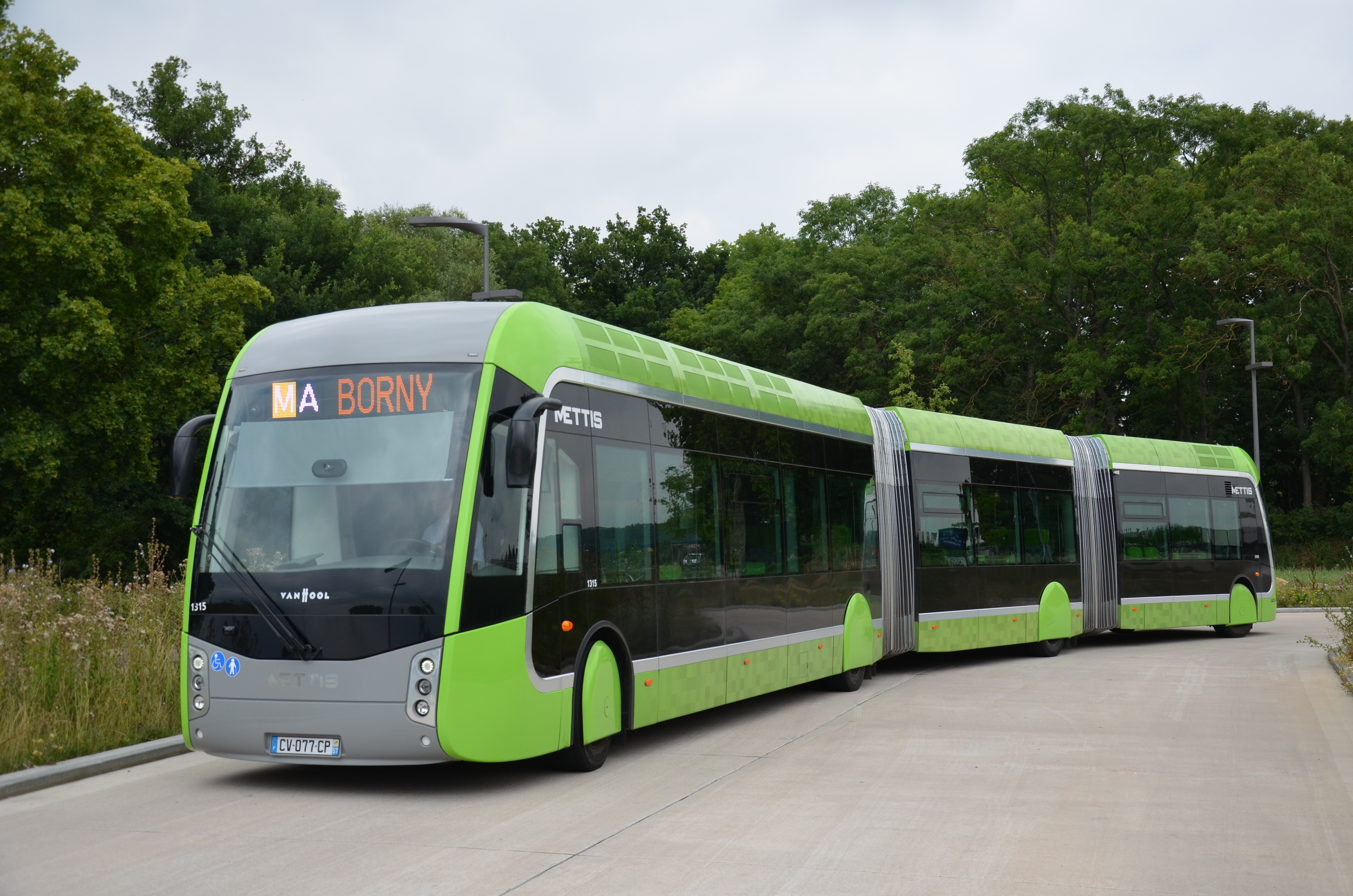
A bi-articulated Van Hool ExquiCity 24 on Mettis services at Metz, France

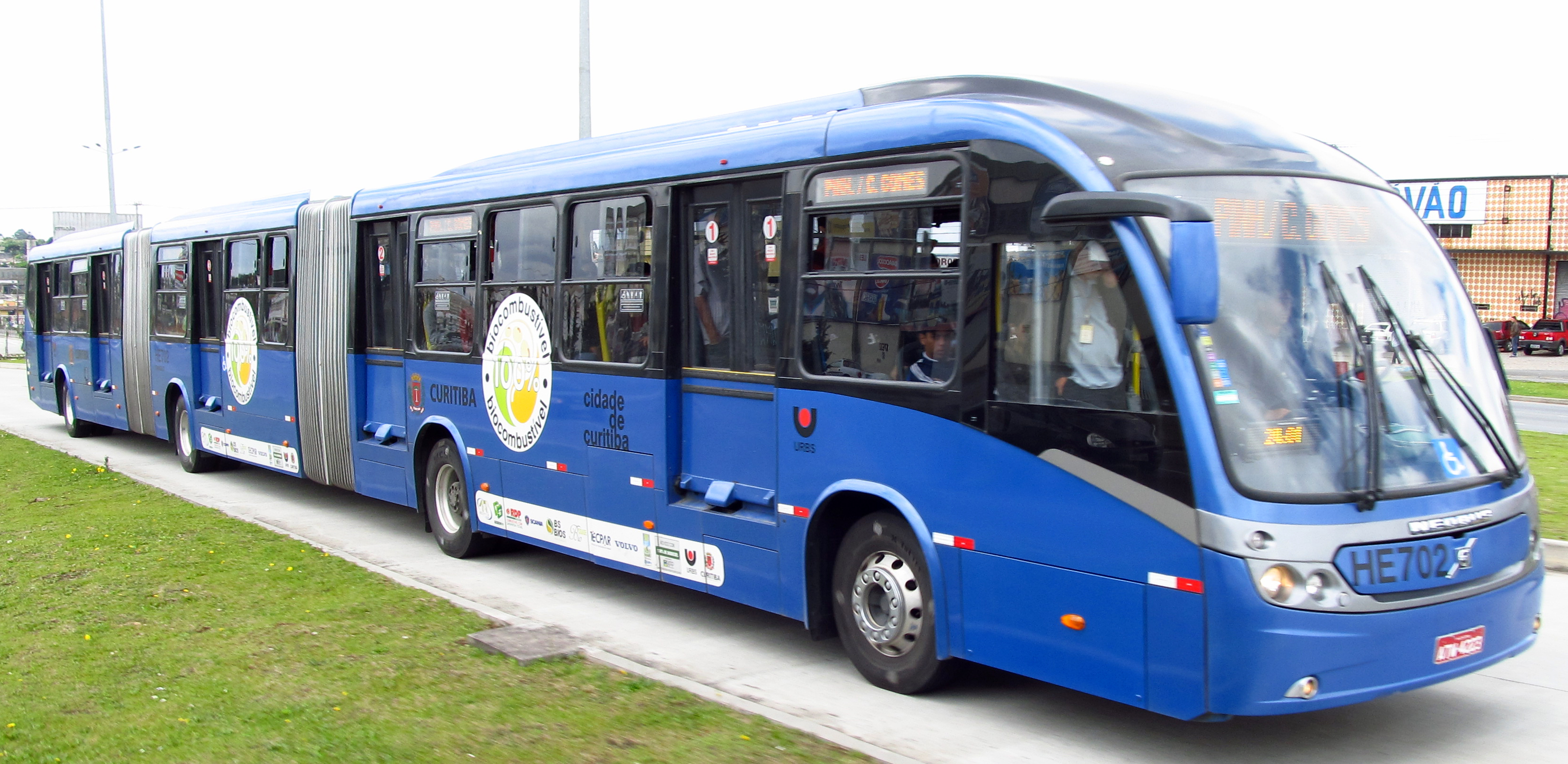
Curitiba Neobus bodied bi-articulated Volvo B12M running with 100% biofuel. At 28 metres, it is one of the world's longest buses. Each section features train-like doors for rapid exchange of people.

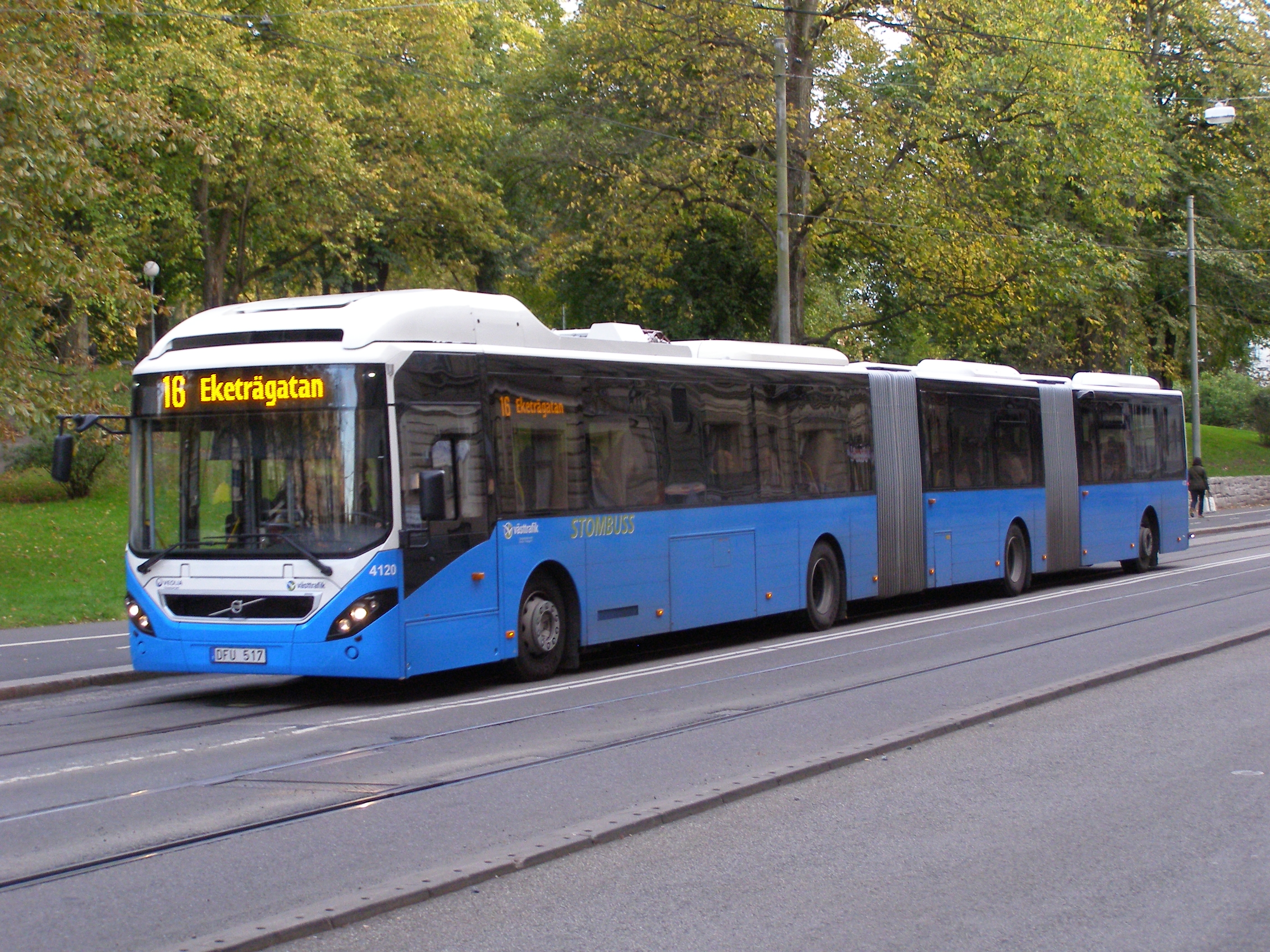
Gothenburg - Bi-articulated Volvo bus

A bi-articulated bus or double-articulated bus and sometimes train-bus, tram-bus, trackless tram or double bendy bus is a type of high-capacity articulated bus with an extra axle and a second articulation joint, as well as extended length. Bi-articulated buses tend to be employed in high-frequency core routes or bus rapid transit schemes rather than in conventional bus routes.

== Design considerations ==
Common bi-articulated buses resemble rail vehicles in design. They often have elevated train-type doors instead of traditional bus doors to use dedicated stations. Payment is typically made at a bus station using a fare gate rather than on the bus.

Compared to using multiple smaller buses on a route, challenges using a bi-articulated bus include:

- difficulties maneuvering in traffic
- an increased turning radius
- the need to have extended length station platforms
- reduced frequency of service (one larger bus every 10 minutes rather than two regular sized buses coming once every 5 minutes)
- less flexibility for scheduling, routing, and maintenance.

However, a bi-articulated bus requires fewer drivers relative to the number of passengers per bus.

== Early versions ==
In 1960, the Chengdu Bus Factory presented the first bi-articulated bus in China based on the chassis of the Ikarus 60, with a capacity of over 300 passengers. This received nationwide coverage, including in the People's Daily. However, the technological immaturity during the Great Leap Forward era and a lack of the support of other associated industries meant the bus did not enter mass production.

In November 1983, the Shenyang Bus Factory completed a 22.7 metres long bi-articulated bus with steerable first and last axles, resulting in a minimum turn radius of 24 metres. The bus had a nominal capacity of 280 and a maximum capacity of 350. Based on that, a second bi-articulated bus was produced in 1986, featuring improvements gained from the experiences of developing the first bus and technologies from the Karosa B 731.

In the late 1980s, the French manufacturers Renault and Heuliez Bus developed the "Mégabus" (officially the Heuliez GX237), a bi-articulated high-floor bus. The demonstrator Mégabus visited transit agencies throughout France, but the only city to order them was Bordeaux (an order of 10 buses, built in 1989). These buses, now retired, were used on Bordeaux's bus route 7 until the city's tram system opened in 2004.

Hungarian bus manufacturer Ikarus also developed a bi-articulated bus prototype, the Ikarus 293, in 1988. There was only one prototype made, because the length of the bus caused it not to work perfectly. During the test run in the city of Pécs, bus drivers have complained about the vehicle's slowness, its high deviation, its slow acceleration and turning speed. After it has seen multiple exhibitions, the bus was transported to Ikarus's depot in Mátyásföld. In 1992, a company in Tehran bought it and changed its interior, and swapped its original motor to a 280 hp MAN motor. Because of the new motor's space requirements, the second passenger door was also moved forward. They also repainted it. In Tehran, the bus has worked for 17 years, until its retirement in 2009. In 2022, the BKV has made a replica from two Ikarus 280-s, which is only slightly different from the original prototype. There are two main differences, the replica in Budapest features a more powerful motor, and a more stable and safer axle mechanism. The vehicle is not taking part in passenger transport, but is regularly seen by public during open days.

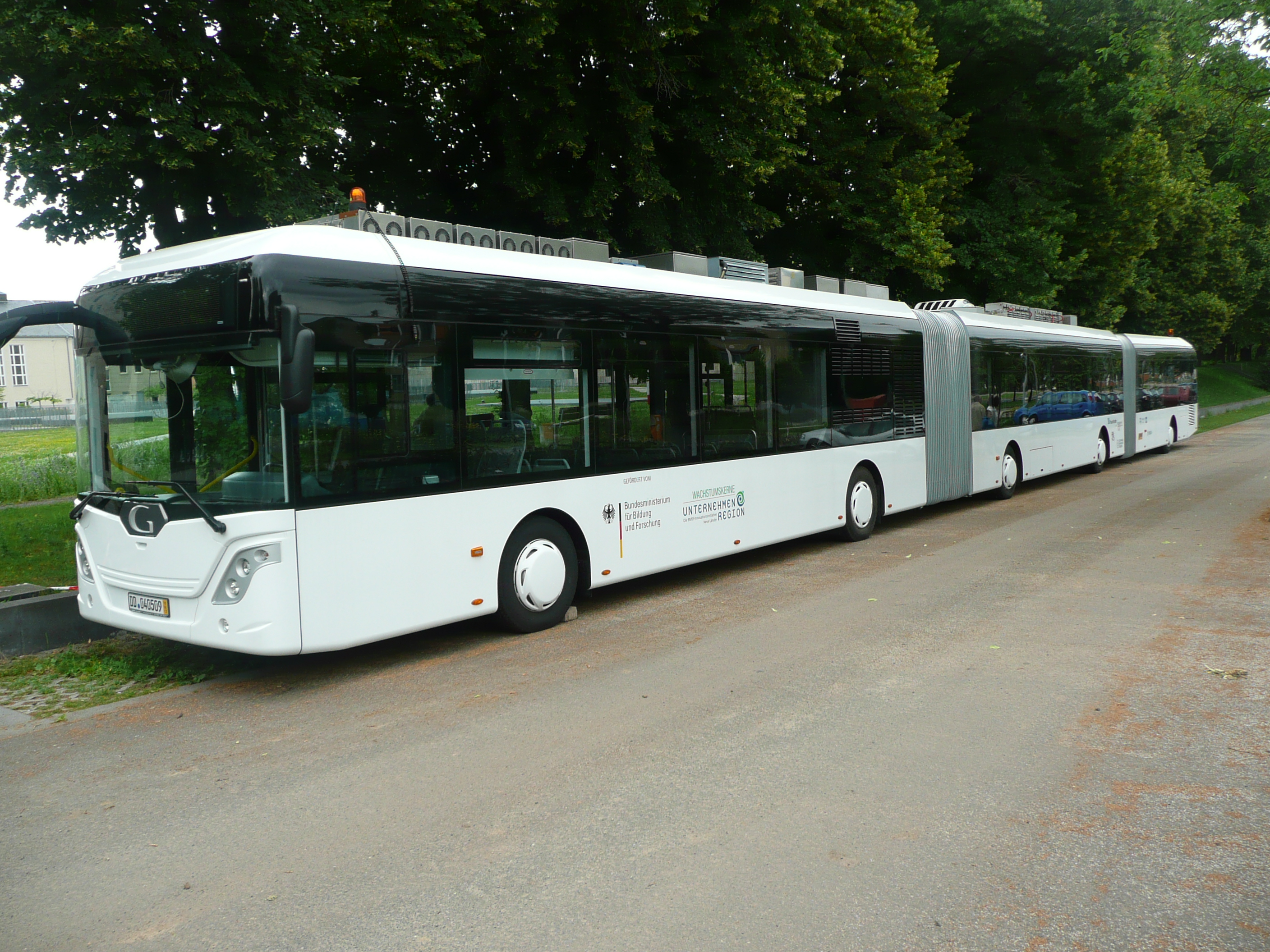
An AutoTram Extra Grand

In Bucharest, the ITB (today the STB) operated a double-articulated trolleybus (unofficially called DAC 122E), made by adding a modified section between the first and the last sections of a DAC 117E articulated trolleybus delivered in 1980, with the rear trailing section coming from a damaged DAC 117E. This vehicle was built to fulfill the need of high capacity person transportation, which was proving difficult for the ITB in 1988, when the prototype was made. However, the DAC 117E's 134 kW traction motor proved insufficient for such a heavy vehicle, let alone the weight of passengers when it operated at full capacity. As a result, the vehicle was very slow and had trouble operating on grades, especially the incline between Cișmigiu Park and University Square. It also had trouble making sharp turns and was difficult to control, especially on snow or ice. This trolleybus was operated on long lines with wide roads and no major turns except the end of the lines like 69 and 90, but occasionally entered on lines 85, 66, 79 and 86. Bucharest traffic became increasingly intense in the very late 1990s, and RATB sought shorter trolleybuses. The DAC 122E was withdrawn from regular service, being occasionally used on lines 69 and 90 until 2000 when it was fully removed from service, displaced by the then-new Ikarus 415Ts and scrapped. Bucharest no longer operates bi-articulated vehicles (except for trams) due to high traffic levels, which is also the reason why between 2007 and 2018, the RATB refused to operate normal articulated buses. A regular double-articulated diesel bus was also made but the capital police refused to allow it to be road legal and to register it on the grounds of its excessive length being outside of the highway code (maximum 17m for articulated buses), and was converted to a regular bus shortly after; the trolleybus was allowed to run being part of a different vehicle class owing to its electric traction.

== Use ==
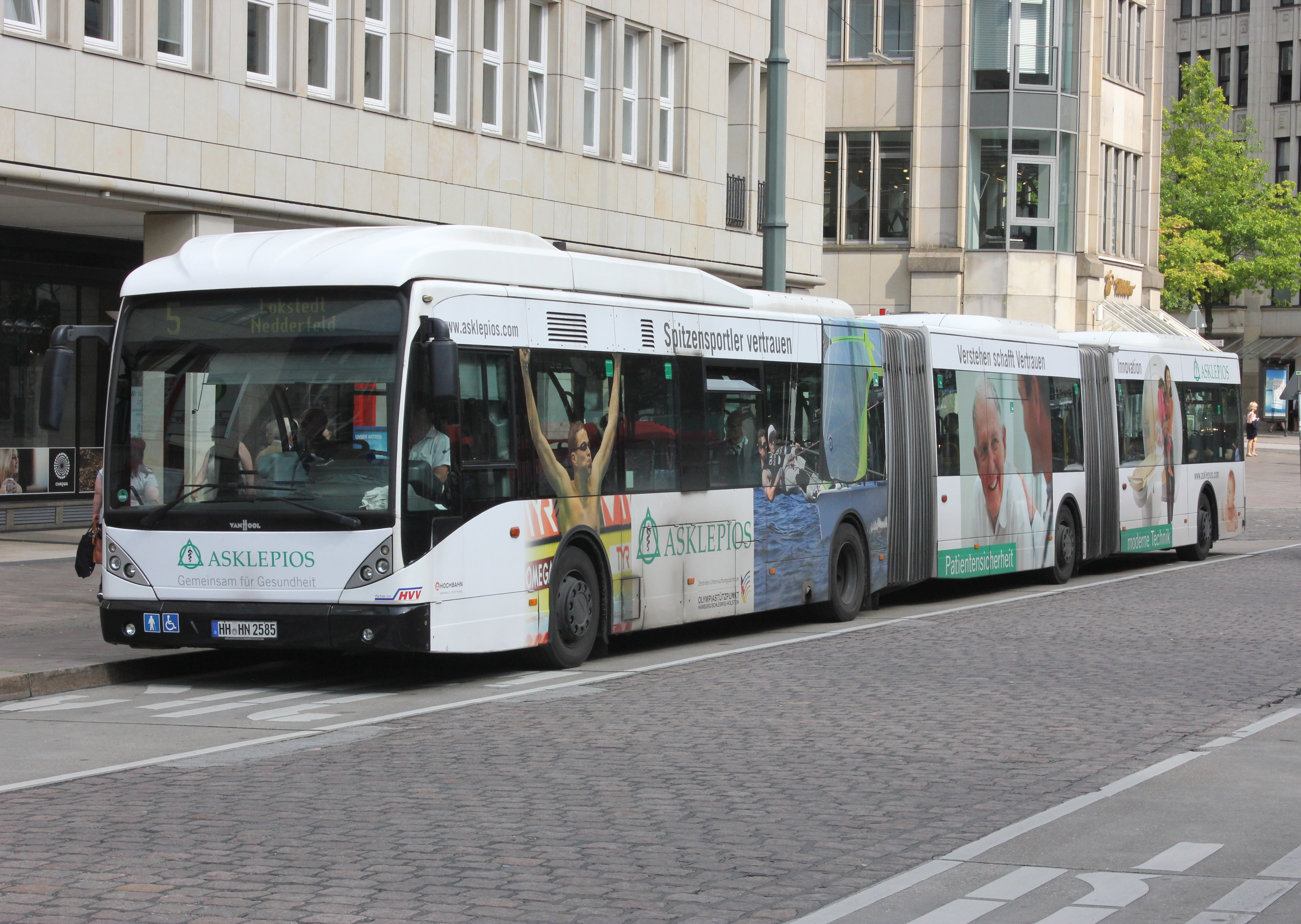
A Van Hool bi-articulated bus in Hamburg, Germany

A bi-articulated bus is a long vehicle and usually requires a specially trained driver, as maneuvering (particularly reversing) can be difficult. Articulated electric trolleybuses can be difficult to control, with their motors producing momentary peak power in excess of 600 kilowatts (816 PS; 805 hp). The trailer section of a "puller" bus can be subject to unusual centripetal forces, which many people can find uncomfortable, although this is not an issue with "pushers". Bi-articulated buses are difficult to reverse park as joints force the bus into a zig-zag shape.

The transit system that has used bi-articulated buses the longest is the Rede Integrada de Transporte, in Curitiba, Brazil, which provides a type of service that has come to be known – particularly in American English – as bus rapid transit (BRT), where buses run in dedicated lanes and stop only at enclosed stations. Use of bi-articulated buses began in 1992, with vehicles manufactured by Volvo (chassis) and Marcopolo/Ciferal (body), able to carry up to 270 passengers. Each bi-articulated bus is equipped with five doors where passengers can quickly load and unload. Buses stop only at enclosed, tube-shaped stations, where passengers pre-pay the fare and then board at the same level as the vehicle floor. Curitiba has over 170 bi-articulated buses in operation on routes serving five main corridors of dedicated bus lanes. These buses run on an average period of 50 seconds during peak hours.

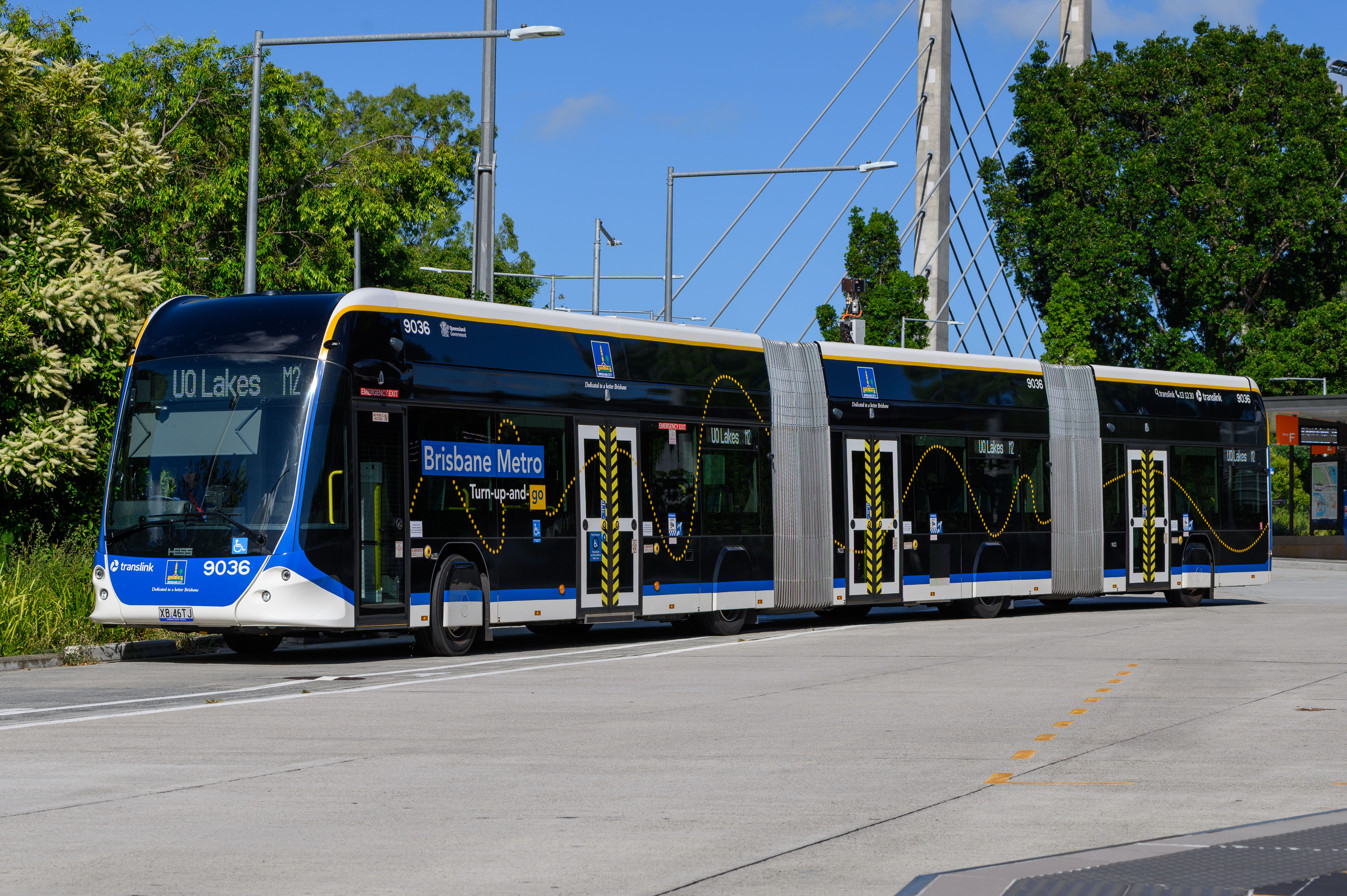
A bi-articulated bus used on the Brisbane Metro

=== Australia ===
Bi-articulated low floor buses with a capacity of 170 passengers have operated on Brisbane Metro since October 2024, the services operate on metro route M1 (replacing routes 111 and 160, commenced on June 30th, 2025) and M2 (replacing route 66, commenced on January 28th, 2025).

=== Belgium ===
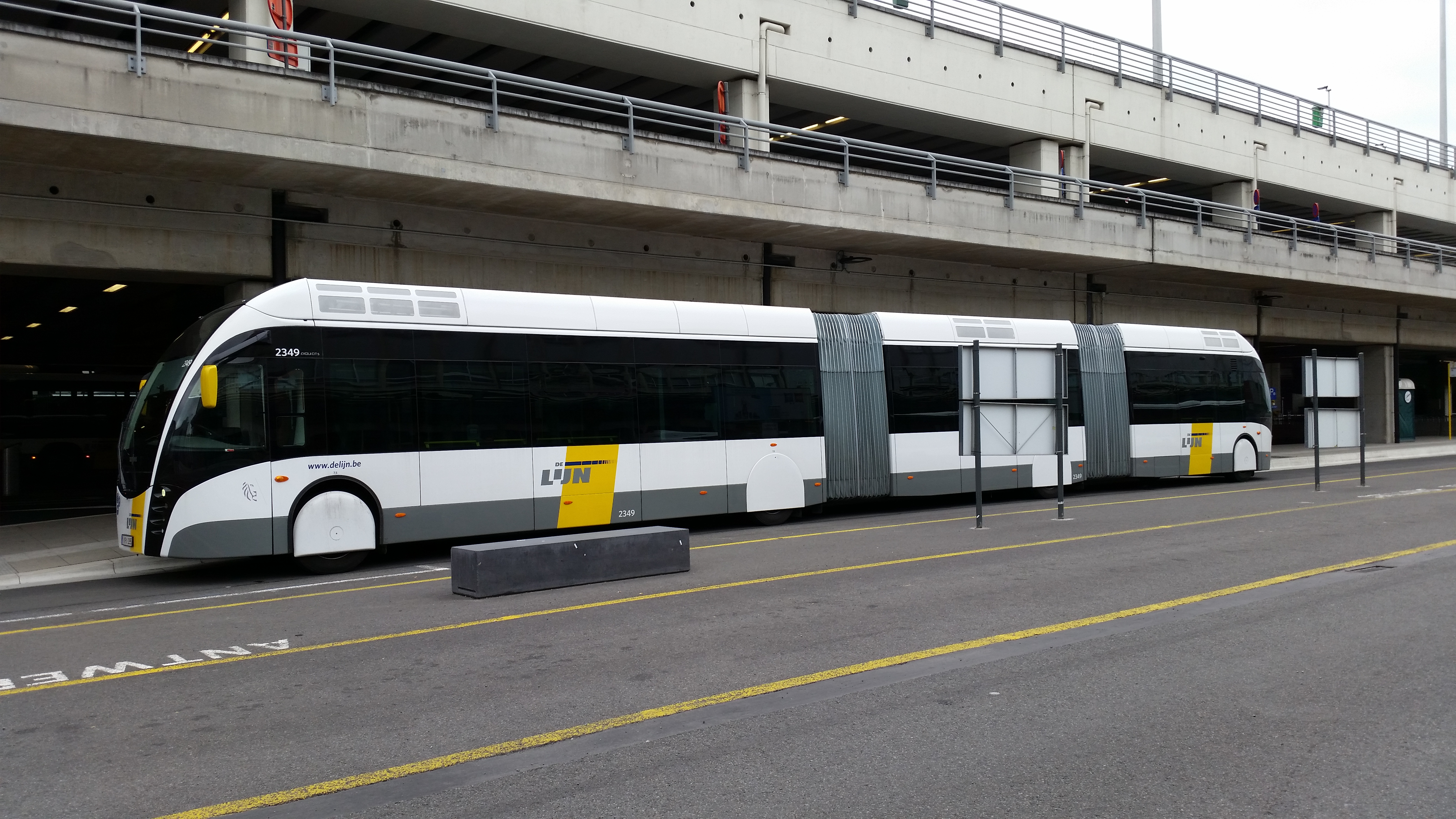
A Ringtrambus hybrid bus in Belgium

On 28 June 2020, the Flemish regional public transport company De Lijn inaugurated the Ringtrambus (route 820(currently the R20)) between Brussels Airport and Jette via Vilvoorde, operated half-hourly by 14 24-metre double-articulated buses. The service is presented as a step towards the tramline that was originally proposed.

In Wallonia, TEC has operated a Van Hool AGG300 on line 48, between Liège and Sart-Tilman, from 1998 to 2020.

=== Bosnia and Herzegovina ===
Since 2020, Banja Luka has also operated 4 Volvo bi-articulated buses. These high-capacity buses are used on some of the city's busiest routes, including lines 3, 14A and 17. Most routes are usually operated by standard articulated buses, including 15 MAN Lion's City GL and 10 Mercedes-Benz Citaro G vehicles. The remaining services are operated by conventional urban buses from MAN, Mercedes-Benz, Setra and Iveco.

=== Brazil ===
The Brazilian bus body manufacturers Marcopolo, CAIO, Busscar and most recently Neobus have made many bi-articulated buses on top of Volvo chassis. They are currently used in Rio de Janeiro, São Paulo, Campinas, Goiânia, Curitiba and, outside of Brazil, in Bogotá, Colombia.

In November 2016, Volvo launched the Volvo Gran Artic 300 bi-bus chassis, specifically developed in Brazil for BRT systems. At 30 metres (98 ft) long, this chassis is capable of carrying 300 passengers.

=== Canada ===
In November 2019, Quebec City's Réseau de transport de la Capitale announced that it was planning to open the city's first BRT line along Boulevard Charest by 2026, using a fleet of bi-articulated electric buses. This was later changed to the Quebec City tramway system before planning was suspended by the provincial government.

Winnipeg's Transit Master Plan, released in April 2021, includes consideration of the use of 90-foot bi-articulated buses on the city's future bus rapid transit routes, and notes that the station platforms on the Winnipeg Rapid Transit system's Southwest Transitway are already designed to accommodate bi-articulated buses.

In Ontario's York Region, the depot and maintenance facilities for the Viva Rapid Transit system include future accommodations for 80-foot double-articulated buses.

=== China ===
The Chinese manufacturer Youngman developed the JNP6250G bi-articulated bus for 300 passengers with assistance from Neoplan. In 2007, these buses appeared on trial service in Beijing and were thought to be the world's longest, at 25 metres (82 ft) long.

=== Colombia ===
TransMilenio in Bogotá has operated bi-articulated buses since 2009, having purchased 120 by 2013. In 2020 it received a further 58.

=== Czech Republic ===
The Belgian manufacturer Van Hool offered a 25-metre (82 ft) bi-articulated bus with a capacity of about 180 passengers. This bus was tested in Prague, with line 119 connecting the Václav Havel Airport Prague with the rest of the city. Later the rear part of the bus crashed into a passing truck and the project was abandoned. 25 Škoda-Solaris 24m trolleybuses (also called Škoda-Solaris Trollino 24 or Škoda 38Tr) with a length of almost 25 meters are operated in Prague, connecting the airport to the nearest metro station Nádraží Veleslavín. The trolleybuses have accumulators so they can run without overhead wires for some distance.

=== Denmark ===
In September 2023, Aalborg introduced bi-articulated buses (under the name plusbus) running between Væddeløbsbanen and Aalborg University Hospital.

=== Ecuador ===
Empresa de Pasajeros de Quito in Quito operates bi-articulated buses since 2016, having purchased 80. They are Volvo DH12D buses, model B340M EURO 3, with a diesel tank capacity of 120 gallons and a 340 HP engine. The chassis is a bi-articulated Volvo B340M.

=== France ===
The Swiss manufacturer Hess produces 22 bi-articulated lighTram 25TOSA electric. These units are used in the city of Nantes for the BusWay line 4, to replace the Mercedes-Benz Citaro G CNG of the line, which had become under capacity (these having been assigned to line 5). The line 4 carries an average of 42,660 riders per day in 2018, the Hess buses having entered service at the end of 2019.

The city of Metz and the island of Martinique run Van Hool Exqui.City 24 hybrid diesel-electric buses, and the city of Nîmes run the natural gas-electric version.

=== Germany ===
The Belgian manufacturer Van Hool offers a 25-metre (82 ft) bi-articulated bus with a capacity of about 180 passengers. These buses were used in the German cities of Aachen (lines 5 and 45) and Hamburg (Metrobus 5 and Eilbus E86), where single-articulated buses alone were not able to handle the huge number of passengers per day. In Hamburg they were retired in 2018 after 13 years of service as they started to require more and more maintenance due to their growing age and an unusual level of wear and tear, caused by the second articulation joint. In Aachen they were withdrawn in 2019.

In 2012, Fraunhofer IVI introduced the AutoTram Extra Grand in Dresden. With overall length of 30.73 metres (100 ft 10 in) it is the longest bus in service with a passenger capacity of 256. Its unique 5-axle design is made possible using advanced computer-controlled steering on the 3 trailing axles.

=== Luxembourg ===
The Swiss manufacturer Hess produces a bi-articulated, hybrid-engine bus based on the LighTram. This type is currently in use for the Luxembourgish bus operator Voyages Emile Weber.

=== Netherlands ===
The Belgian manufacturer Van Hool offers a 25-metre (82 ft) bi-articulated bus with a capacity of about 180 passengers. In September 2002, fifteen were deployed on lines 11 and 12 in Utrecht, connecting the central railway station to office, college and university buildings at the edge of the city. Twelve more have been added since.

From August 2014 to 2016, Swiss manufacturer Hess's bi-articulated LighTram buses were in service in Groningen, Netherlands on the route from the main train station via the city centre to the university north of the city. In 2016 these buses were moved to Utrecht because the few stops and higher speeds on this line made the hybrid engine perform poorly.

=== Norway ===
An AtB Van Hool Exqui.City 24 on line 3 in Trondheim, Norway

From August 2019 onwards, Trondheim have used Van Hool Exqui.City 24 CNG Hybrid on three core routes, known as the Metrobuss system.

=== Slovakia ===
16 Škoda-Solaris 24m trolleybuses (also called Škoda-Solaris Trollino 24 or Škoda 38Tr) have been running in Bratislava, the capital of Slovakia, since 2023.

=== Spain ===
Barcelona had 24-meter long bi-articulated buses, running on gas, on line H12 since May 2013 until 2024. In 2024, they were retired because of reliability problems and high fuel usage.

=== Sweden ===
Volvo has manufactured several bi-articulated buses for in use in Gothenburg. They are based on Volvo's "puller"-type articulated, low-floor bus model with the internal combustion engine mounted on the floor on the side of the bus, and the cooling system on the roof. They are not manufactured anymore and have been replaced by Mercedes-Benz CapaCity normal articulated buses.

The city of Malmö has since 2014 operated hybrid bi-articulated buses on line 5. Line 8 has since 2022 been operated with electric buses. Both lines uses 24-meter long, bi-articulated buses from Van Hool.

=== Switzerland ===
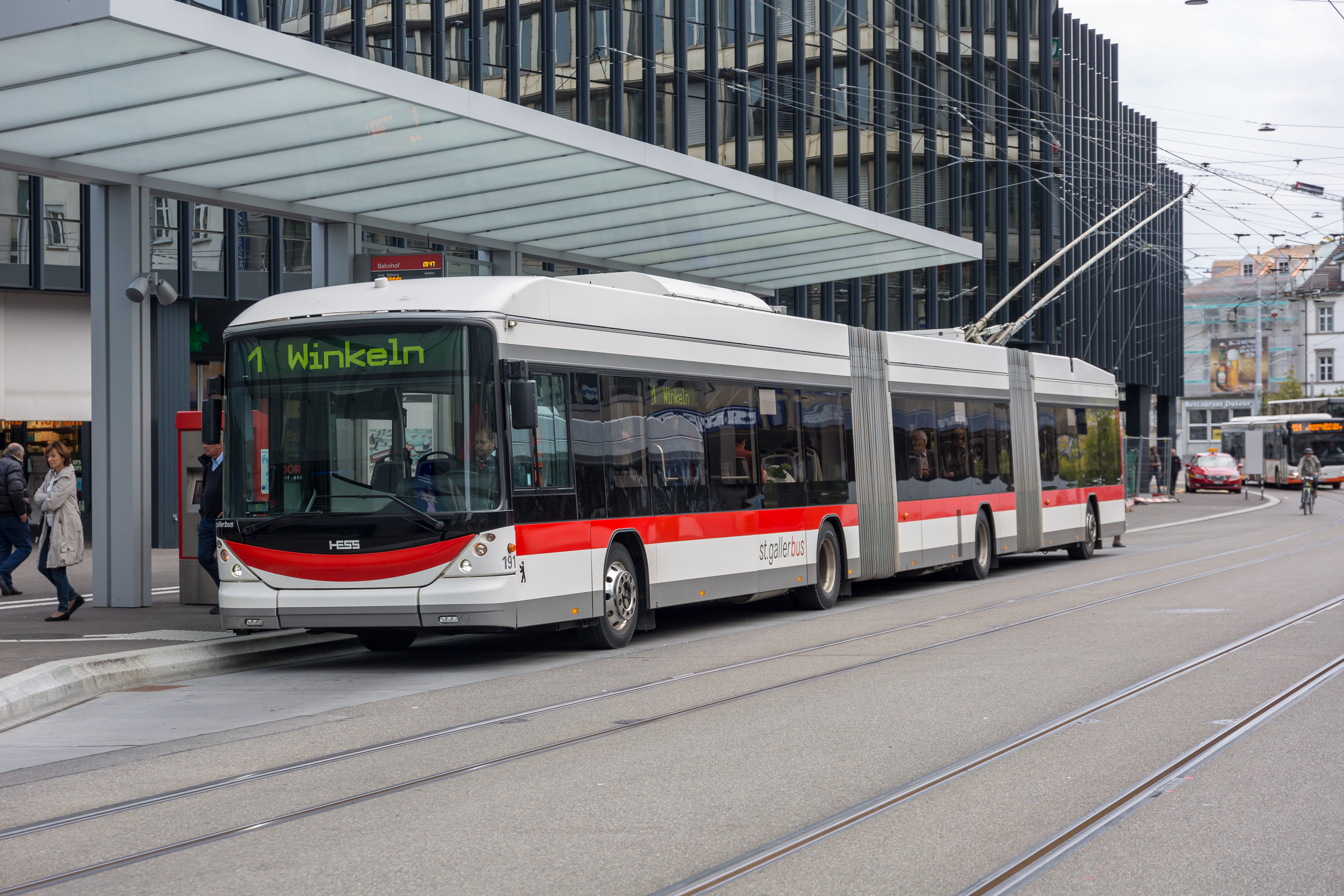
Hess LighTram trolleybus in St. Gallen

The Swiss manufacturer Hess produces a bi-articulated trolleybus called LighTram that is in use in several Swiss cities, including Zürich, Geneva, Lausanne and Lucerne.

=== Turkey ===
İstanbul makes significant use of Akia Ultra LF bi-articulated buses in the Metrobüs. Ankara, Manisa, Malatya and Elazığ also operate bi-articulated buses.

== Further articulation ==
In 2024, Istanbul's İETT transit agency began trials of a tri-articulated bus with 4 rigid segments developed by CRRC. The tests were reportedly successful but it does not seem to have entered service as of September 2026.

== See also ==
- Autonomous Rapid Transit
- Bombardier Guided Light Transit
- List of buses
- List of bus operating companies
- Road train
- Trailer bus
