= AutoTram Extra Grand =

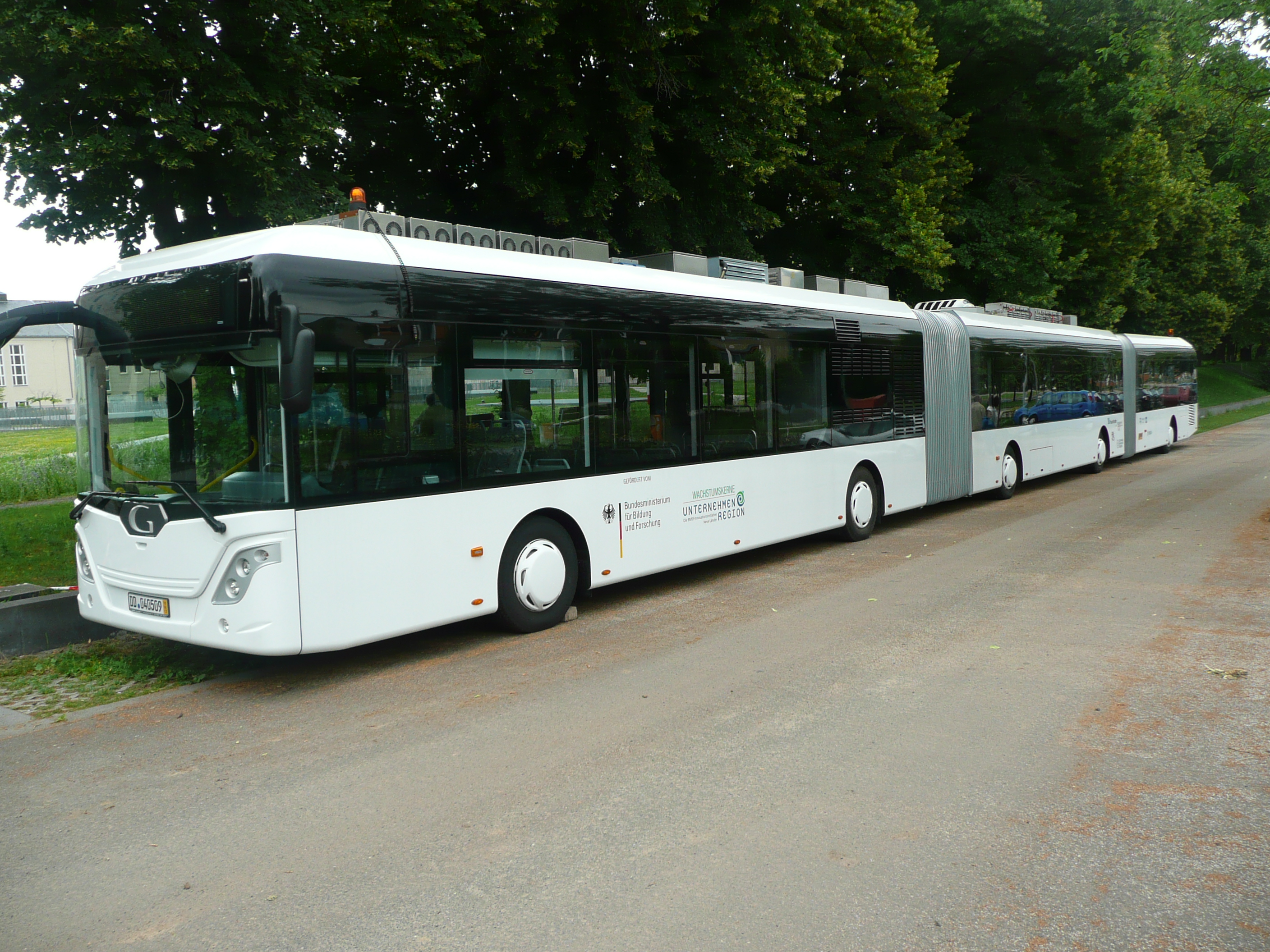
- AutoTram Extra Grand

Overview
- Manufacturer: Göppel Bus & Fraunhofer IVI & MAN

Body and chassis
- Doors: 5
- Floor type: Low-floor
- Chassis: Integrated low-floor frame
- Related: Göppel Go4City19

Powertrain
- Engine: IVECO-FIAT N60; Mercedes-Benz OM629
- Capacity: 256 (Note: Assuming maximum seating as specified by spec sheet. The bus did not enter commercial service.)
- Power output: 455 kW (610 hp)
- Transmission: AC-AC

Dimensions
- Length: 30.735 m (100 ft 10.0 in)
- Width: 2.55 m (8 ft 4 in)
- Height: 3.4 m (11 ft 2 in)
- Curb weight: 27,320 kg (60,230 lb)

Chronology
- Predecessor: MAN SGG280 (partially related)

The AutoTram Extra Grand was a prototype of a bi-articulated passenger bus. It was around 30 metres (98 ft) long and had a maximum capacity of 256 passengers (96 seats), making it the largest passenger bus in the world. It received wide attention during its and unveiling and public test drives, but never went into active service.

== History ==
The AutoTram Extra Grand was unveiled and tested in Dresden, Germany, in August 2012. The bus was rejected in Germany, citing the cost of infrastructure upgrades necessary to accommodate it. The producer, German bus company Göppel Bus GmbH went bankrupt in 2013. After being sold to Kirov Plant, they went bankrupt again in October 2014, and the company was liquidated. Aside from the demonstrator unit in Dresden and the units ordered by Beijing and Shanghai, no one else ordered the bus.

== Specifications ==
The bus is 30.73 m (100.8 ft) long, 2.55 m (8 ft 4 in) wide and 3.4 m (11 ft) tall. It is a hybrid-electric vehicle and is capable of driving 5 miles (8.0 km) on electric power alone. The prototype vehicle cost US$10 million.

== See also ==
- Volvo Gran Artic 300
- Van Hool AGG300
- Bi-articulated bus
- Bus rapid transit
- Public transport
