= Neobus =

Neobus is the name of two separate and unrelated bus manufacturers:

- Neobus (Serbia)
- Neobus (Brazil)
