= Busbetrieb Aarau =

Swiss public transport company

Busbetrieb Aarau AG
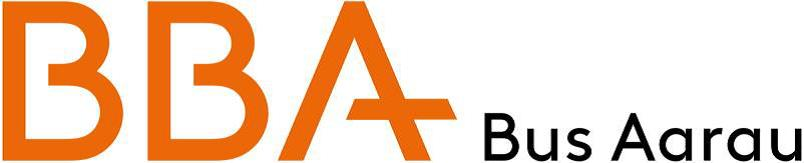
- Company type: Private company
- Industry: Public transport
- Founded: 1958
- Headquarters: Aarau, Switzerland
- Area served: Aargau
- Parent: None
- Website: https://busaarau.ch/

Busbetrieb Aarau AG is a public transport operator serving the city of Aarau, Switzerland and the surrounding areas in the Canton of Aargau. It was founded in 1958 and operates using the BBA Bus Aarau brand.

Between 2002 and 2018, the Busbetrieb Aarau formed part of an umbrella brand, the AAR bus+bahn, along with the Wynental- und Suhrentalbahn (WSB). Vehicles of both undertakings prominently displayed the AAR bus+bahn brand, displacing their own brandings. The two companies shared some senior managers, but remained legally distinct. In 2018, the WSB became part of the Aargau Verkehr company and the AAR bus+bahn brand was disbanded. The Busbetrieb Aarau now operates under its own brand with its own management team.

The Busbetrieb Aarau is a member of the A-Welle tariff network that provides zonal ticketing across the various modes and routes operated by its members. In the Aurau region these include rail services run under the Aargau S-Bahn name by both the main lines (run by Swiss Federal Railways) and the Menziken–Aarau–Schöftland line (run by Aargau Verkehr).

== Routes ==
Number	Start point	End point
1	Küttigen	Buchs
2	Barmelweid	Rohr
3	Gretzenbach	Aarau
4	Biberstein	Suhr
5	Goldern	Aarau
6	Wöschnauring	Suhr
7	Zelgli	Aarau

The Busbetrieb Aarau operates on seven routes. It utilises a fleet consisting of 37 buses, of which 21 are articulated, manufactured by Solaris, Volvo, Scania and Hess.
