= Aarau–Schöftland railway =

The Aarau–Schöftland railway may refer to:

- The Aarau–Schöftland railway line, a narrow-gauge railway line in Switzerland
- The Aarau-Schöftland Bahn, the former railway company that originally built the Aarau–Schöftland railway line
