= Aarau–Menziken railway =

The Aarau–Menziken railway may refer to:

- The Aarau–Menziken railway line, a narrow-gauge railway line in Switzerland
- The Wynentalbahn, the former railway company that built the Aarau–Menziken railway line
