= Volvo Gran Artic 300 =

Overview
- Manufacturer: Volvo

Dimensions
- Length: 30 metres

The Volvo Gran Artic 300 is a proposed bi-articulated bus chassis manufactured by Volvo. It was developed in Brazil to operate on bus rapid transit systems. At 30 metres, it will be the longest bus in the world and be able to carry 300 passengers. It was launched in November 2016.

== See also ==
- AutoTram Extra Grand, a bi-articulated bus about 30 m (98 ft) in length
