= TOSA (bus) =

Urban battery electric bus system built by Carrosserie Hess

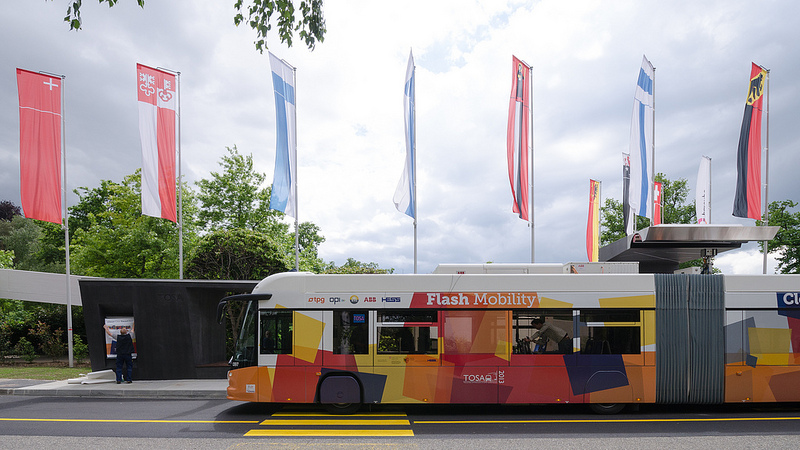
Articulated TOSA bus

The Trolleybus Optimisation Système Alimentation (TOSA) bus, concept and test like trolleybus, flash charging system is a full large capacity urban battery electric bus system built by Carrosserie Hess and developed together with ABB Sécheron, a subsidiary of ABB.

== Aim of the concept and project ==
The aim is to provide a zero local emission mass public transportation bus system with high passenger capacity and no overhead line.

The concept supports same operating timetable and frequency as line operated with diesel buses, trolleybuses and operating conditions of Bus Rapid Transit systems. The following aspects have been considered to comply with a sustainable mobility approach:

- Minimise use of raw material throughout the life cycle: lithium-titanate battery technology has been selected accordingly.
- Energy efficiency: High passenger capacity, low vehicle weight (small battery), conductive energy transfer and grid connection with peak shaving.
- Safety and health: Low emission of radiation Non-ionizing radiation during energy transfer at bus stops (conductive connection) and battery technology; zero local emission of particles; low noise; small visual impact.

== Origin of name ==
TOSA stands for Transports Publics Genevois, Office de la Promotion Industrielle, Services Industriels de Genève and ABB, the four partners of the demonstrator project TOSA2013

== The technical concept ==
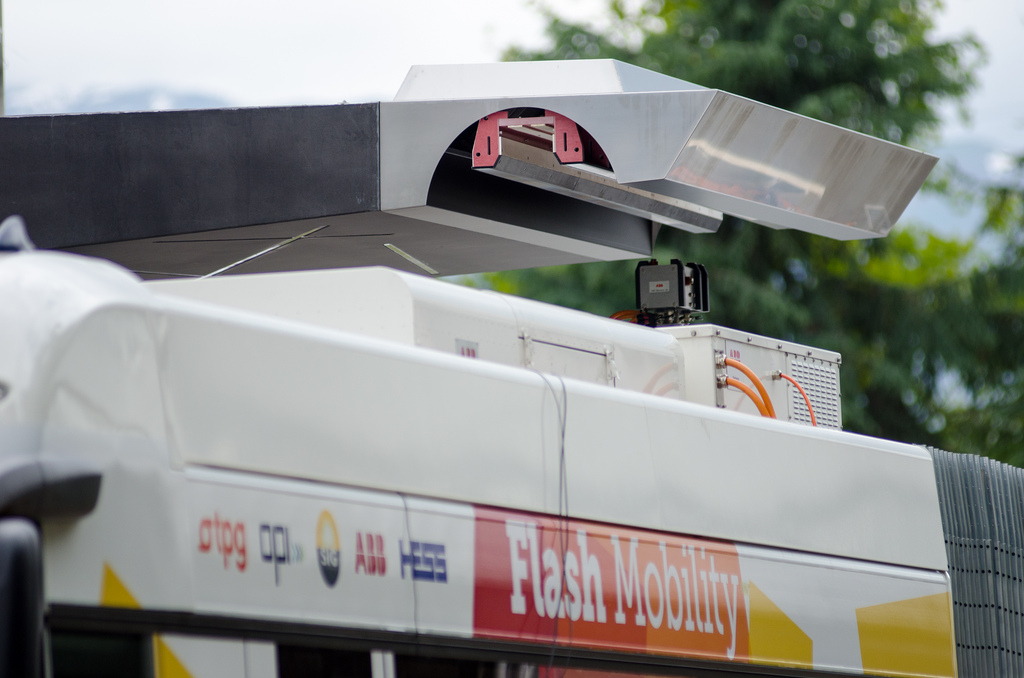
TOSA Energy Transfer System

The energy is collected along the route at some dedicated bus stops (every 3rd or 4th bus stops) while people are disembarking and embarking. Thus, there is no impact on the timetable. The automatic electric connection is made from the top within 1 second while the bus is stopped at the bus stop. Then charging is made at high power (400 kW on the demonstrator) during the 15 seconds the door remains open. At the terminal, the battery is topped up within 3–4 minutes.

== The infrastructure ==
According to the line profile (total length and altitude) and service (frequency), the Flash Feeding Station (FFS) are distributed along the line at some (each 3rd or 4th bus stops - roughly 1.5–2 km) intermediate bus stops. At each end of the line, the recharge is performed by the Terminal Feeding Station (TFS).

- FFS: The Flash Feeding sub-Stations are provided with energy storage to shave the peak of power on the grid required to charge the bus at the intermediate bus stops. As power is limited by the energy storage, the sub-station is connection to the low voltage grid.
- TFS: The Terminal Feeding Sub-Stations is used to charge the bus at the terminal.
- DFS: The Depot Feeding Sub-Stations are used to compensate the energy required by the bus from Depot to the line of service

== Demonstrator (Proof-of-Concept) ==
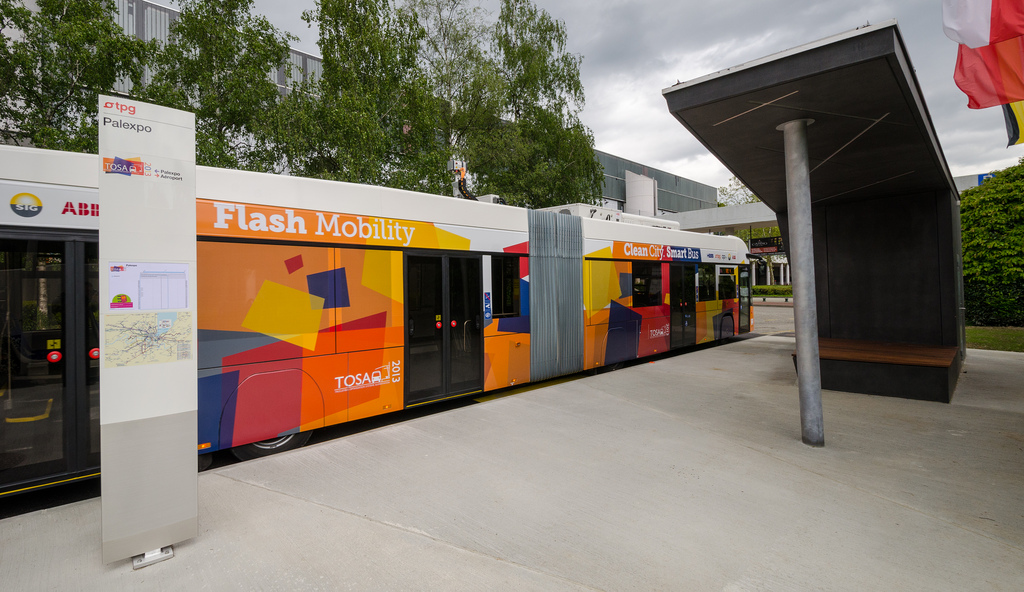
TOSA bus at Palexpo

The demonstrator (one articulated bus, one Flash charging station and one terminal station) is in service since May 26, 2013 between Geneva Airport and Palexpo. It includes:

- one articulated bus of 18.7meters-long and homologation for 133 passengers. The bus manufacturer is the company HESS
- one TFS of 200 kW at the Geneva Air

Partners

- Bus operator: tpg,
- Project coordinator: OPI
- Energy supplier: SIG
- Technology provider: ABB

Other partners

- Bus manufacturer: HESS
- Architecture design: hepia
- Engineering Software: epfl, HE-Arc
- Financing: Canton of Geneva, Swiss Federal Office of Energy SFOE, Federal roads office FEDRO
- Land: PALEXPO
