= Van Hool AGG300 =

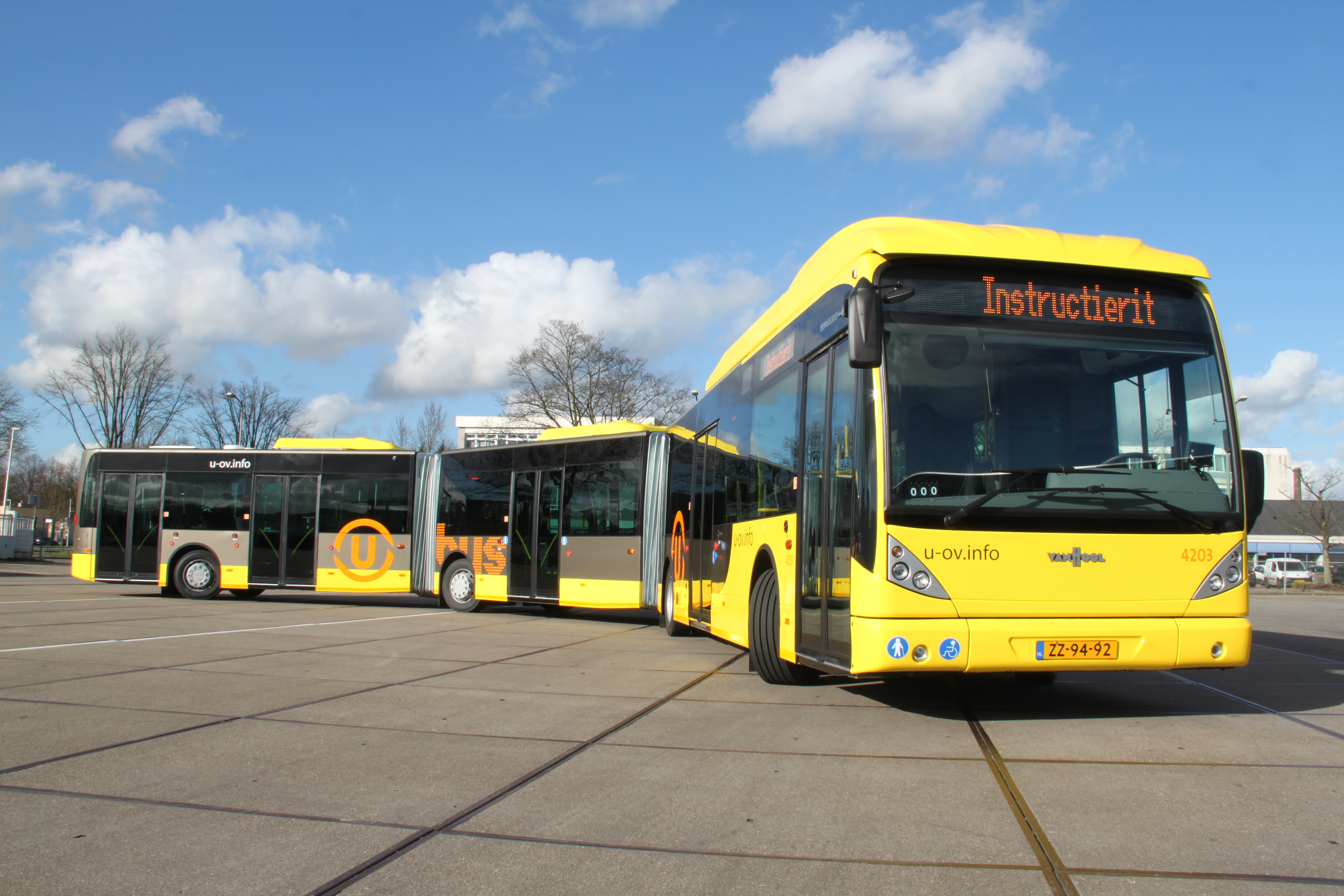
- Van Hool new AGG300 in Utrecht

Overview
- Manufacturer: Van Hool

Body and chassis
- Doors: 4 or 5
- Floor type: Low-floor

Powertrain
- Engine: DAF PR Euro6/EEV
- Power output: 265 kW
- Transmission: Voith/ZF ECOMAT II

Dimensions
- Length: 25.0 metres (82 ft 1/4 in)
- Width: 2.5 metres (8 ft 2 3/8 in)
- Height: 3.2 metres (10 ft 6 in)

The Van Hool AGG300 is a 25-metre long bi-articulated bus produced by Van Hool NV at their Belgian facility in Koningshooikt.

In the 1990s two prototypes were built, one of these vehicles still remains in service in Liège, and the other (ex-demonstrator) in Angola.

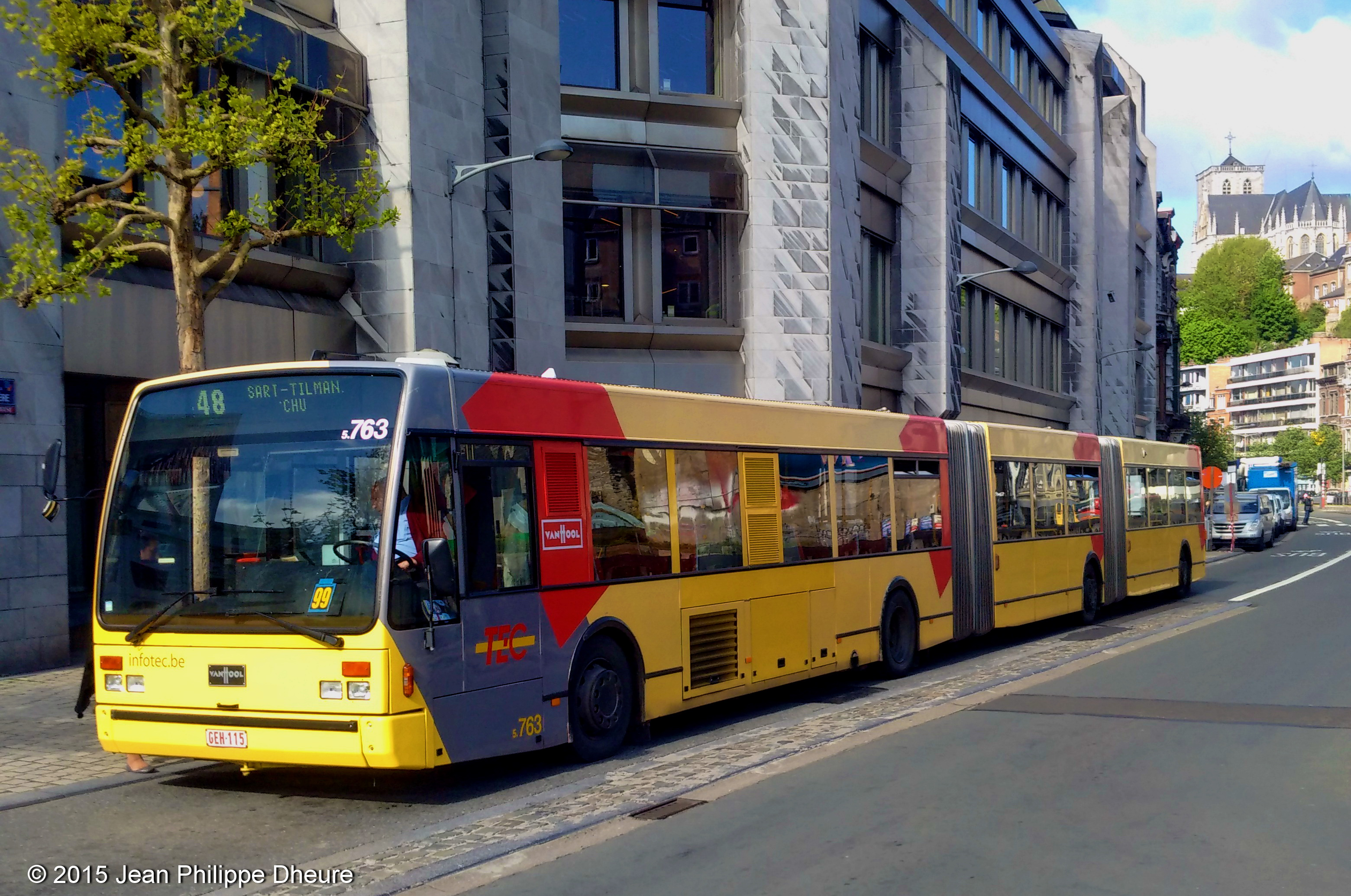
An AGG300 with the old-style bodywork in Liège in 2015.

In 2001, the AGG300 received an updated front design and became known as the newAGG300. In 2002, GVB of Utrecht ordered 15 buses of this type for lines 11 and 12, which are particularly busy. Utrecht was the first city where these buses were widely used. In 2003, 12 additional buses were delivered.

In June 2006, as part of the 100th anniversary of public transport in Groningen, an AGG300 was ordered as part of a 3-day demonstration, which ran route 15 in the morning and route 22 in the afternoon.

In 2015, the Lithuanian Kauno autobusai bought four Van Hool AGG300 for the busy route 37. These are the longest buses used in the Baltic states. Now the buses are used on routes 18, 23 and 46, which go to suburbs.

== See also ==
- List of buses
