= Carrosserie Hess =

Swiss commercial vehicle manufacturer

HESS AG
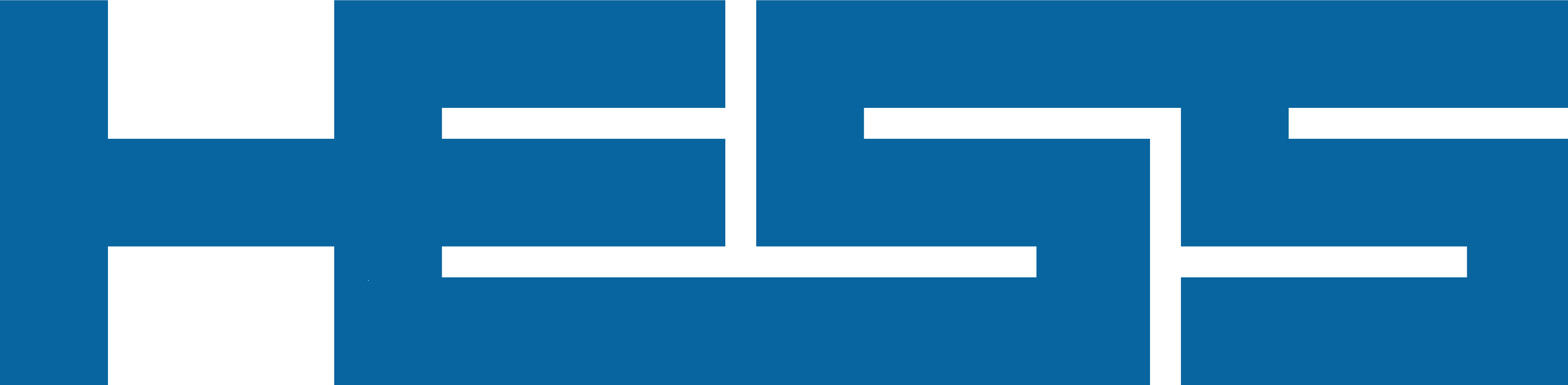
- Trade name: Carrosserie Hess AG
- Type: Aktiengesellschaft
- Industry: Automotive
- Founded: 1882; 144 years ago
- Founder: Heinrich Hess
- Headquarters: Bellach, Switzerland
- Areas served: Worldwide
- Key people: Alex Naef (CEO); Ernst Basler (CFO)
- Revenue: 230 million CHF
- Number of employees: 1200
- Website: hess-ag.ch

Carrosserie Hess AG (stylised as HESS), or Hess AG for short, based in Bellach in the canton of Solothurn in Switzerland, is a medium-sized manufacturer of buses, trolleybuses, passenger trailers, bus kits and commercial vehicles. Their vehicles operate in several countries, including the United States, Canada and Australia.

== History ==
=== Early development and aluminium bus construction (1882–1970s) ===
The company was founded in May 1882, when Heinrich Hess set up business in Solothurn to build customised car bodies. Hess initially carried out maintenance and repair work on horse-drawn and ox-drawn wagons.

In the commercial vehicle sector, Hess produced vehicles and bodywork for goods transport as well as vehicles for passenger and freight transport. In the early years of the company, these included ox carts, horse-drawn wagons and handcarts. Over time, the company developed truck bodies with loading platforms and transport bodies for light and medium-duty vehicles. From the 1960s onwards, Hess started using lightweight aluminium constructions and modular loading platforms for trucks.

By around 1900, the workshop employed eight wagon builders and smiths. In 1919, Heinrich Hess handed over the workshops to his sons Arnold and Emil, who began converting the company into a business for building bodies for motor vehicles.

Hess began building bodies for buses shortly after 1919. In the 1920s, open excursion buses known as Car Alpin were built for the Swiss postal service for use on Alpine routes. Because these vehicles proved unsuitable for the climatic conditions, all-weather versions were later developed with convertible roofs that allowed operation in both summer and winter. During this period, Hess also began experimenting with aluminium in bus construction and gradually introduced aluminium components in order to reduce vehicle weight.

Hess entered the trolleybus sector in 1939, when the city of Biel/Bienne decided to replace its tramway with trolleybuses. The first vehicles, delivered in 1940, were built on Berna chassis with electrical equipment supplied by Brown, Boveri & Cie. Further orders followed, including vehicles for Basel and later trolleybuses for the system in Lucerne. Hess supplied vehicle bodies to the Swiss Armed Forces from an early stage and later participated in projects for military vehicles, including bodywork for the DURO all-terrain vehicle developed within the Bucher Group.

The company also produced vehicles and bodywork in larger series for public institutions such as the Swiss postal service (PTT) and the Swiss Federal Railways (SBB). In 1943, Hess built its first passenger trailer on a Saurer chassis for the Swiss postal bus service. In 1946, the company introduced self-supporting trailer bodies without a conventional chassis. Two such vehicles were supplied to the transport operator in Lucerne, where they remained in service until the early 1970s.

In 1947 Hess expanded its facilities with a new workshop building in Bellach, enabling the company to handle larger orders.

In 1961, Hess commenced building of articulated vehicles, some of which were supplied to operators in the United States and Canada in 1975. The company soon began to expand, and businesses were set up in Portugal and Australia in 1957 and 1978 respectively. The U.S. business was set up in 1996.

Between the mid-1970s and the late 1970s, Hess also participated in the development and production of standardised trolleybuses for several Swiss cities within a cooperative project involving several body manufacturers. These articulated trolleybuses were delivered to cities including Basel, Bern, Geneva, Neuchâtel and Zurich.

=== Modular construction and low-floor buses (1980s–2000s) ===
In the 1980s, Hess introduced the CO-BOLT construction system, a modular body structure based on bolted aluminium profiles. This concept simplified vehicle assembly and allowed buses to be adapted to different requirements.

In the 1990s, growing demand for low-floor buses influenced vehicle development. Transport operators increasingly required vehicles with improved accessibility, which led Hess to redesign its bus bodies and to act increasingly as a general contractor supplying complete vehicles. At the same time, the company expanded cooperation with international chassis manufacturers such as Scania and MAN, supplying buses for operators in Switzerland and abroad.

The company began production of low-floor buses and trolleybuses in 1991, and its first Swisstrolley model, built in conjunction with Nutzfahrzeuggesellschaft Arbon & Wetzikon (NAW) and introduced in that year, was one of the first low-floor trolleybus models anywhere. In 2003, Hess built the first double-articulated trolleybus in Switzerland, when it built and added a middle section to Geneva articulated trolleybus No. 709 (which was then renumbered 721). The experimental addition eventually led to series production at Hess of double-articulated trolleybuses in 2005, for the Geneva trolleybus system, followed the next year by orders from the Zürich trolleybus system and the Lucerne trolleybus system.

In later years, changes were made to the exterior design of buses. This resulted in a design generation known as CO-BOLT 3, which introduced larger glazed areas as well as modifications to the exterior and interior. The first vehicle with this design was presented in 2006 at the Suisse Transport exhibition in Bern.

In 2007, Hess introduced the lighTram Hybrid, a double-articulated hybrid bus intended for high-capacity urban transport. In the same year, the company also presented a midibus concept designed for operation on mountainous routes. Later, the mountain buses, available in five lengths and in the standard width of 2.55 metres, were marketed by Hess under the name SwissAlpin.

=== Electrification and international expansion (2010s–present) ===
In 2013 and 2014, various hybrid vehicles from Hess were tested in regular service. AAR bus+bahn, for example, operated a hybrid articulated bus under normal service conditions. In 2014, additional double-articulated hybrid buses of the lighTram series were delivered to the Luxembourg operator Voyages Emile Weber.

From 2014 onwards, Hess increasingly implemented electric bus concepts alongside the further development of the CO-BOLT-3 design. In this context, the rapid-charging system TOSA (Trolleybus Optimisation du Système d’Alimentation) was introduced. Following earlier trials, the first bus route using TOSA vehicles entered regular service in Geneva in 2017.

The rapid-charging system tested in Geneva was later used in further projects outside Switzerland. As part of the Brisbane Metro bus rapid transit project, Hess received an order to supply 60 double-articulated electric buses of the type lighTram 25, which are charged along the route at rapid-charging stations based on the TOSA principle. For operation in Australia, a right-hand-drive version of the lighTram was developed, designed for left-hand traffic and included in the product range from the early 2020s.

During the 2020s, Hess supplied electrically powered articulated and double-articulated buses to various European transport operators, including Geneva, Lyon and Nancy, where Hess vehicles were introduced as part of the modernisation of existing trolleybus and electric bus systems.

As the revised KUB chassis from Scania introduced in 2021 no longer allowed the axles to be shortened, Hess decided to discontinue production of the 2.40-metre-wide mountain buses marketed under the name SwissAlpin. Together with the lighTram range, which had by then become available as a battery-electric bus in all sizes, this meant that from 2022 onwards, Hess offered only electrically powered buses in its product range. The last diesel bus built by Hess was a SwissAlpin delivered to Bus Ostschweiz in March 2022.

In March 2022, Hess announced that it would temporarily suspend bus production at its plant in Minsk and increasingly relocate manufacturing back to Bellach. The decision followed public debate concerning the production of electric buses in Belarus and the political situation arising from the war in Ukraine. Due to increased production demand, manufacturing capacity was expanded. In addition to the main plant in Bellach, a production facility in Vila Nova de Famalicão, Portugal, began operations in 2022, where body structures and bus shells are manufactured.

In November 2022, Hess received a major order from the Verkehrsbetriebe Zürich (VBZ) following an international tender for the renewal of the trolleybus fleet. The order initially included the delivery of 13 battery-assisted articulated trolleybuses and 13 battery-assisted double-articulated trolleybuses of the lighTram type. Additional lighTram orders were also announced in the same year. For Neuchâtel and La Chaux-de-Fonds, 18 vehicles of the type lighTram 19 DC were ordered, and in Nancy the delivery of 25 lighTram 25 DC vehicles was agreed. For the Brisbane Metro project in Australia, 60 double-articulated buses of the type lighTram 25 TOSA were ordered. Further contracts included 40 lighTram 19 TOSA vehicles for Clermont-Ferrand and eight lighTram 19 DC vehicles for Salzburg.

In 2024, Hess announced that the commercial vehicle division would be relocated from Bellach to a new site in Subingen. One aim of the move was to free up capacity in Bellach while using more modern facilities in Subingen. In the same year, Hess, together with Verkehrsbetriebe Zürich (VBZ), launched the Swiss eBus plus project, a federally supported pilot programme for the development of an energy-efficient battery-electric bus. The project is scheduled to run until 2026 and serves as a research platform for studies on thermal management and battery technology.

In 2024, it was also announced that the Italian city of Vicenza had ordered 16 articulated TOSA buses from Hess, intended for operation on a new line from 2027.

Following the insolvency of the Belgian manufacturer Van Hool in April 2024, ongoing delivery commitments for ExquiCity double-articulated buses for the TZen 4 BRT project in the Paris region were affected. Of the 30 vehicles originally ordered, only five had been delivered before the factory in Koningshooikt closed in May 2024. To ensure completion of the remaining vehicles, Île-de-France Mobilités, the insolvency administrator and Hess agreed that Hess would lease part of the production facility and employ former Van Hool staff to complete the buses. By 2025 the majority of the fleet had been delivered.

In January 2026, Hess acquired the business unit for electric trolleybus systems of the Düsseldorf-based company Kiepe Electric GmbH. Both companies had previously cooperated on trolleybus projects in which vehicles built by Hess were equipped with electrical equipment supplied by Kiepe Electric.

== Products ==
The largest segment for Hess AG is buses and trolleybuses, as well as matching passenger trailers. In addition to complete vehicles, the company also manufactures bus kits for customers worldwide, which are imported and assembled at their destination.

Hess also builds smaller buses, mainly for the transportation of school children and persons with disabilities.

For commercial purposes, the company builds vehicles such as vans, some of which are fitted with tipper equipment, loading ramps and trailers. On occasion, the company also supplies body structures for rail vehicles.

=== Buses and trolleybuses ===
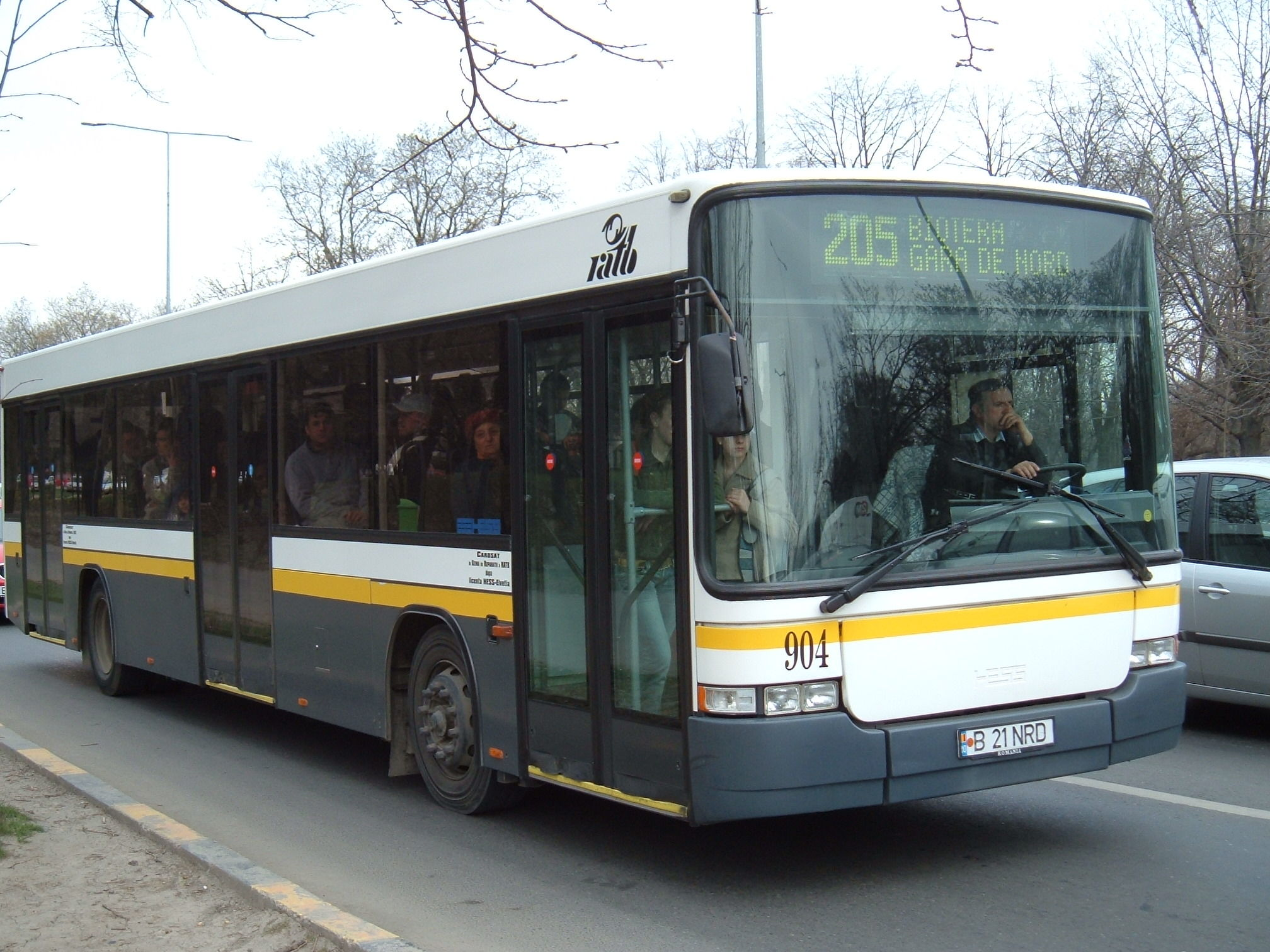
A Carrosserie Hess bus built on DAF chassis in Bucharest, Romania

Hess AG has manufactured only electrically powered service buses since 2022 and also markets associated charging systems. The vehicles are available as both battery buses and trolleybuses and are sold under the lighTram brand name:

- lighTram 10: 10.7 m long midibus
- lighTram 12: 12.0 m long single-deck bus
- lighTram 18: 18.0 m long articulated bus
- lighTram 19: 18.7 m long articulated bus
- lighTram 25: 24.7 m long bi-articulated bus

The midibus, single-deck bus and articulated bus versions are available as depot-charged battery buses under the name Plug. Except for the midibus, all versions are also offered as trolleybuses. In addition to charging the vehicles via a plug at the depot or via overhead lines, the buses can be equipped with systems for fast charging at stops. There is a distinction between the TOSA system, with regular recharging at intermediate stops, and opportunity charging (OPP) with charging at terminal stops.

=== Bus trailer ===
- BusZug: Low-floor passenger trailer for twelve-metre-long coaches or trolleybuses

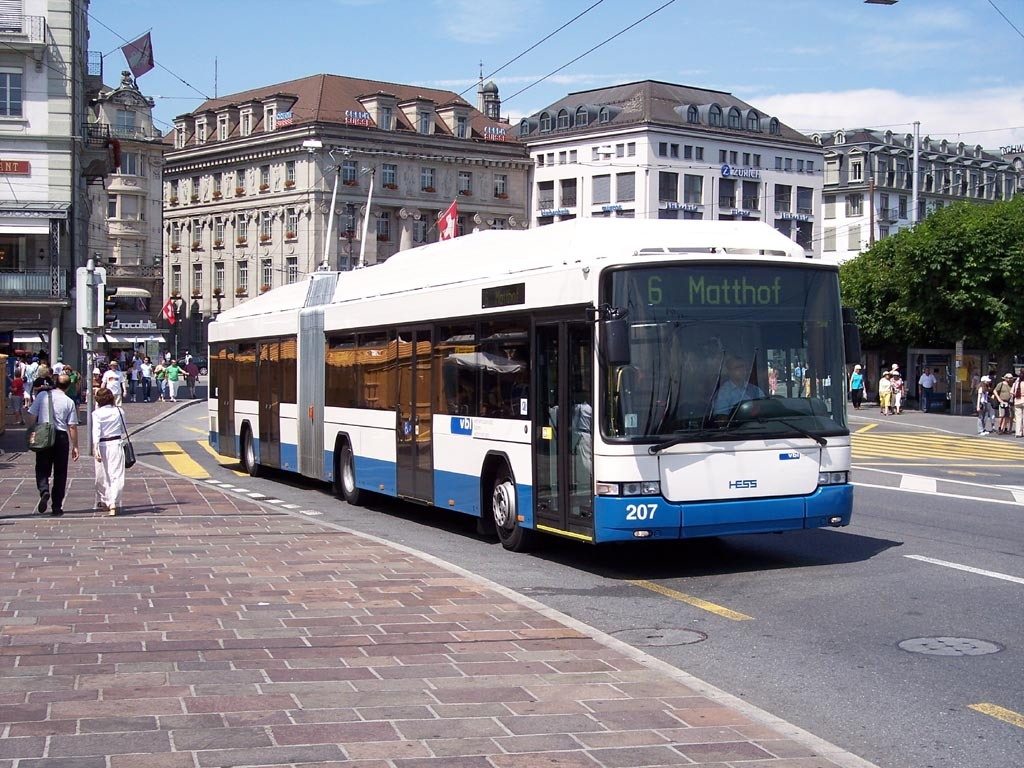
Hess Swisstrolley 3 of an old design in Lucerne

== Licence construction ==
After World War II, the company increasingly established contacts with foreign partners. Interest in lightweight aluminium bus construction was particularly strong in countries where vehicle taxation was linked to weight. Hess built its first bus abroad in the 1950s, which led to cooperation with manufacturers in Portugal, including the company Salvador Caetano. This contributed to the development of Hess’s international licensing offering for aluminium bus construction.

=== Volgren, Cobus and Gillig ===
Cooperation between Hess and the Australian bus operator Grenda Bus began in 1977, and led to the licensed production of buses in Australia from 1978 onwards. In 1978, the first bus kits were delivered to the Australian company Grenda Bus in Melbourne and to the New Zealand manufacturer NZ Motorbodies. The Australians established the subsidiary Volgren for bus production, and three Hess employees travelled to Australia to assist with the construction of the first vehicles. At that time, the aluminium structure was still welded, which made the assembly process relatively complex. For this reason, and in particular to support licensed production, the bolted CO-BOLT system was further advanced. In 1984, the first articulated bus using the CO-BOLT construction method was delivered to Volvo as a demonstration vehicle, which was subsequently used for promotional tours in the United States.

The bus manufacturer Gillig has been one of Hess's licensing partners since 1998. On 2 June 1997, a contract was signed at Gillig that enabled the company to start using the modular aluminium technology developed by Hess.

Hess also developed airport apron buses, which were later marketed internationally under the brand name Cobus.

== Company structure ==
Hess AG is registered in the commercial register as a family-owned Swiss public limited company under the name Carrosserie Hess AG and has its headquarters in Bellach in the canton of Solothurn.

In addition to its sites in Switzerland, Hess operates a production facility in Portugal. Body structures and bus shells are primarily manufactured there, while final assembly and commissioning take place at the main plant in Bellach. For decades, Hess has been cooperating with international licence partners that manufacture buses based on construction systems developed by the company.

The company’s commercial vehicle activities are organisationally separated from the main plant and located at a separate site in Subingen. In total, the corporate group employs more than 1,200 people, the majority of whom work in Switzerland and Portugal. The remaining employees are spread across additional locations and among licence-based production partners.

The business activities of Hess AG are functionally structured and include the development, production and sale of bus bodies, complementary services in the field of vehicle conversions and maintenance, and the manufacture of selected components. To cover different business areas and regional markets, legally independent companies have been integrated into the corporate group over time.

Hess owns the following subsidiaries, among others:

- FBT Fahrzeug- und Maschinenbau AG
- Carrosserie Tüscher AG
- Carrosserie Lauber SA
- Carrosserie Muster & Müller AG
- InterBUS AG
- Lex & Hesse GmbH
