= Neobus (Brazil) =

Tradename of Brazilian bus manufacturer

- Company type: Subsidiary
- Industry: Automotive
- Founded: 1996; 30 years ago
- Headquarters: Caxias do Sul, Rio Grande do Sul, Brazil
- Products: Intercity, Urban, Micro and Mini Buses
- Parent: Marcopolo
- Website: http://www.neobus.net.br/en

Neobus is the tradename of Brazilian bus manufacturer San Marino Ônibus e Implementos Ltda (San Marino bus and Implements Limited) based in Caxias do Sul, Rio Grande do Sul. Neobus initiated production of buses in 1996 and has already manufactured over 30,000 vehicles. The company manufactures the bodies for a whole range of coaches, e.g. microbus, intercity and touring coach. Its primary manufacturing plant, located in Caxias do Sul.

== Navistar partnership with Neobus ==
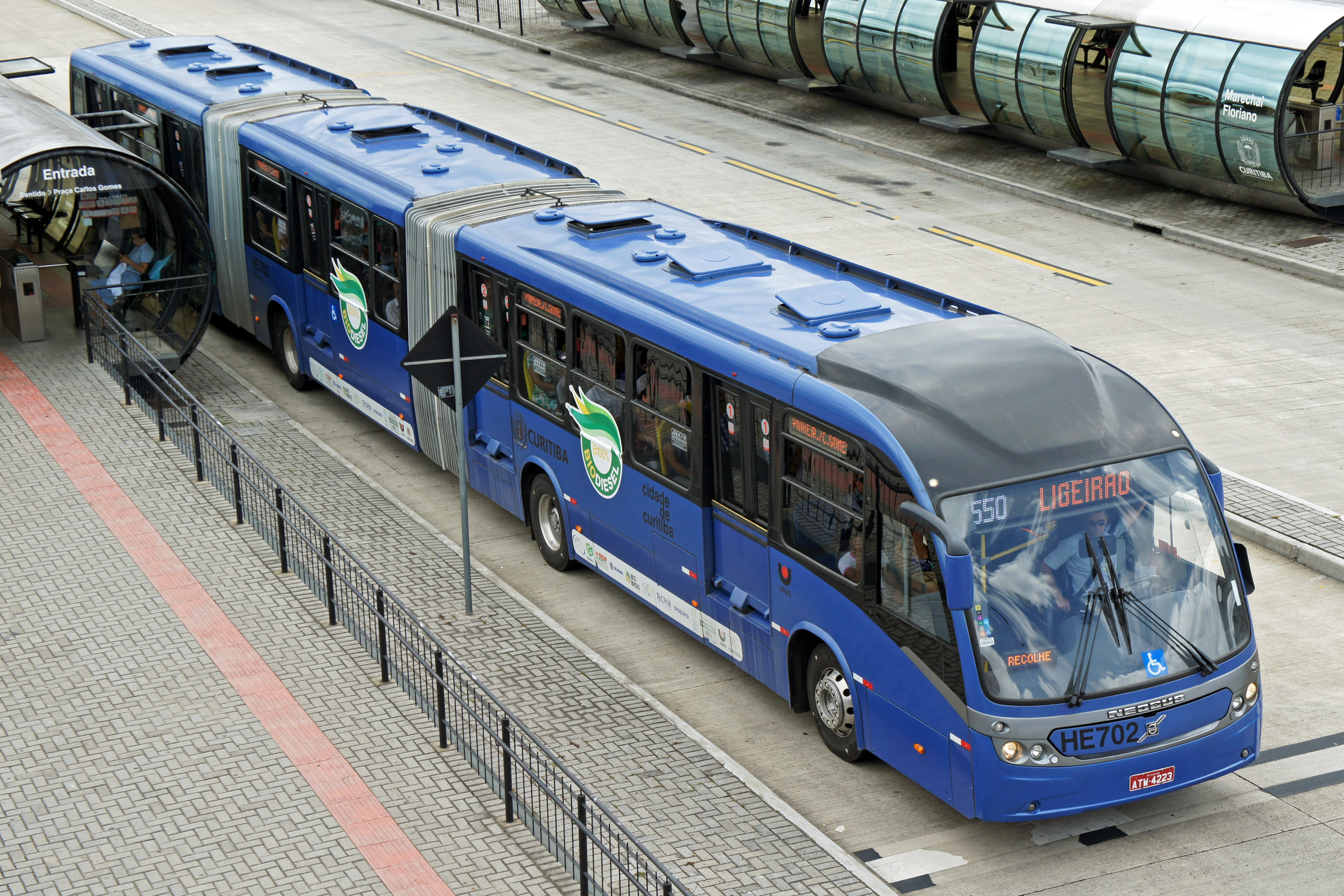
The 28 meters Neobus Mega BRT Bi-articulated bus. One of the longest buses in the world.

On 1 February 2012, Navistar announced that it will form a joint venture with Neobus, for the manufacturing and developing fully integrated buses under the NeoStar brand, which will initially focus on North American and South American markets.

== Products ==
- City Class an Iveco based medium duty bus.
- Mega – a Mercedes-Benz or Volkswagen based transit bus.
  - Mega 1996
  - Mega Evolution
  - Mega 2000
  - Mega 2004
  - Mega 2006
  - Mega BRT – an articulated bus.
  - Mega BRS – a single version of the BRT.
  - Mega BRS Low Entry – a low floor version of the BRS
  - Mega Low Entry – a lower density version of the BRS Low Entry
- Spectrum – an Agrale or Mercedes-Benz based transit bus.
  - Spectrum City
  - Spectrum Class – an executive coach
  - Spectrum Road – a tourist coach
- Thunder – a smaller bus available as in transit, tourist or executive versions.
