= AAR bus+bahn =

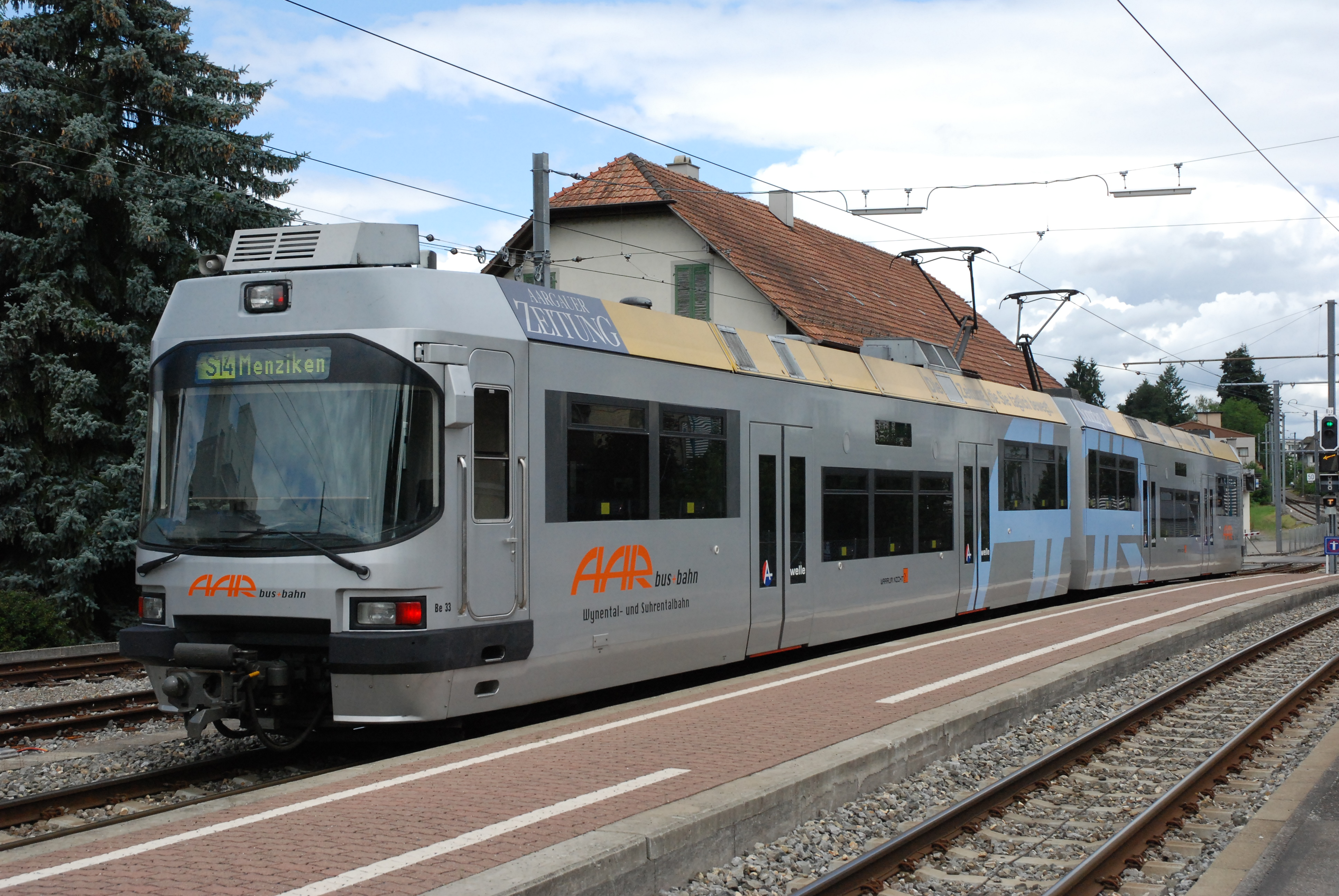
- An AAR-branded train on the Schöftland–Aarau–Menziken railway line in 2009
- Company type: Umbrella brand
- Industry: Public transport
- Founded: 2002
- Defunct: 2018
- Fate: Disbanded
- Successor: Aargau Verkehr (AVA) Busbetrieb Aarau (BBA)
- Headquarters: Aarau, Switzerland
- Area served: Aargau
- Parent: Wynental- und Suhrentalbahn; Busbetrieb Aarau
- Website: http://www.aar.ch

AAR bus+bahn was an umbrella brand of two public transport companies operating in and around the city of Aarau in the Swiss canton of Aargau. It was launched in 2002 and comprised the Wynental- und Suhrentalbahn (WSB) and the Busbetrieb Aarau (BBA). Vehicles of both undertakings prominently displayed the "AAR bus+bahn" brand, displacing their own brandings. The two companies shared some senior managers, but remained legally distinct.

With the foundation of the Tarifverbund A-Welle in 2004, the tariff structure of AAR bus+bahn was integrated into that of A-Welle. Initially this applied only to season tickets and passes, but it was expanded in 2009 to include all other tickets.

With the merger of the WSB with BDWM Transport (BDWM) to form Aargau Verkehr (AVA) in 2018, the AAR bus+bahn partnership was dissolved, and AVA and BBA now operate under their own brands and with their own management teams.
