= Metrobus (Germany) =

MetroBus roundel used in Berlin

The term Metrobus is used for special bus services in Germany since 2001. These services operate in Berlin, Munich and Hamburg as well as Braunschweig until 2015. In general, Metrobuses run more frequent than normal bus lines and sometimes also operate at night. They operate via a more straight path than other lines. Nonetheless they are served with normal buses also used on other lines and can be taken with the same ticket.

== Local characteristics ==
=== Hamburg ===
In summer 2001 the Hamburger Verkehrsverbund introduced the first Metrobus services in Germany. Hamburg’s Metrobus services run until 11 pm every 20 minutes or more often. They supplement the S- and U-Bahn systems and are supplemented themselves by normal (Stadtbus) and express bus services. Lines 1 to 19 are radial lines while lines 20 to 27 run on circular streets and do not touch the city center. Many of the lines follow former tram routes. Metrobus line 5 from Hamburg Hauptbahnhof to Burgwedel is the busiest bus line in Europe.

Before December 2014 Metrobus lines were identified by a special white-on-red roundel (see below). From December 2014 to December 2015 line numbers were led by an M and after December 2015 the designation does not differ from normal bus lines on a red roundel.

2001–2014	2014–2015	from 2015

=== Munich ===
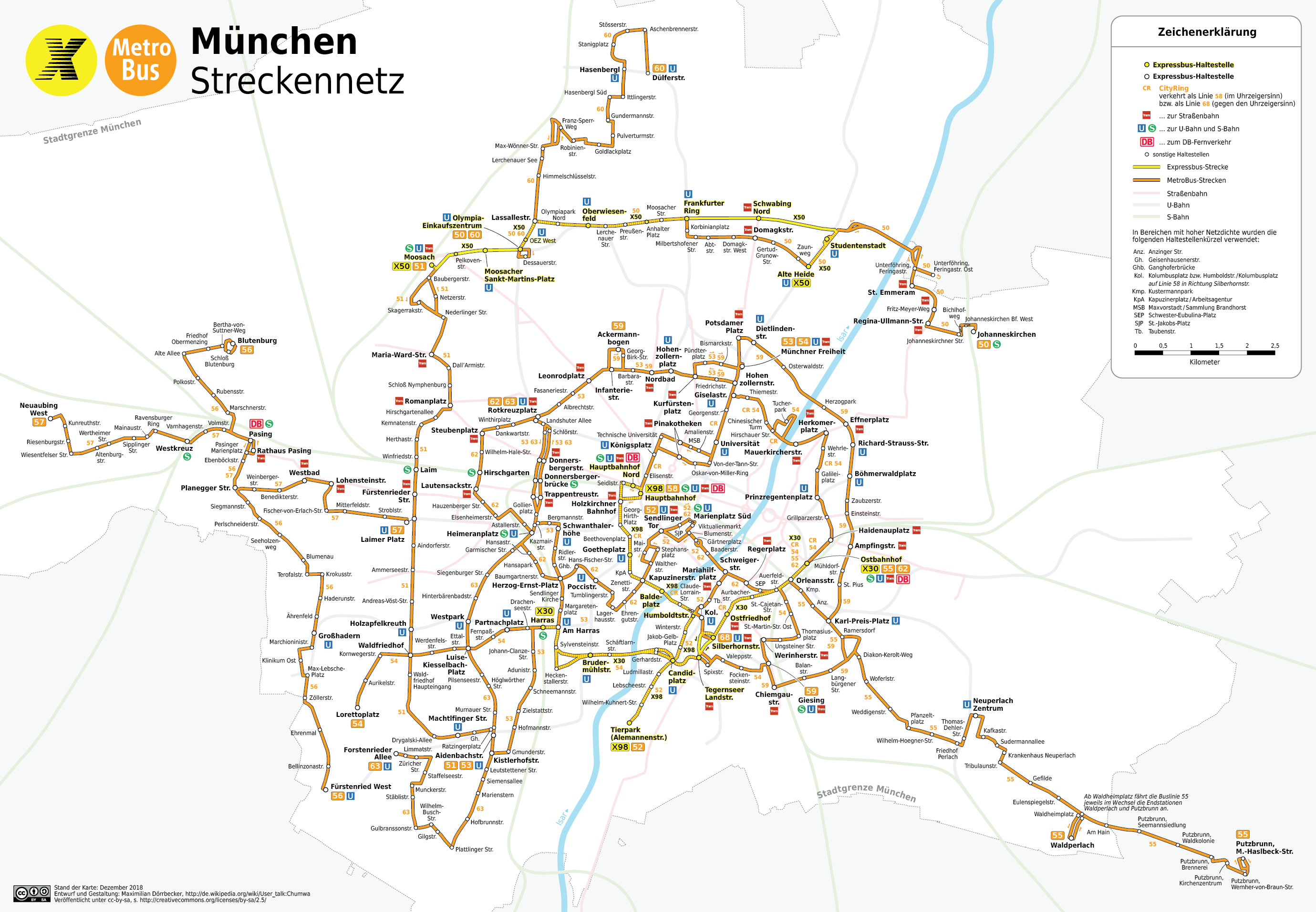
Map showing Metrobus services

In Munich, Metrobuses were introduced in December 2004. These lines carry the numbers 50 to 63 and operate at least every 10 minutes daytime and 20 minutes in the evening. Some lines, for example line 59, were replaced by an extended tram network.

=== Berlin ===
The Berliner Verkehrsbetriebe introduced their Metrobus system in 2006. The system, called Metrolinien or Metronetz consist both of tram and bus services, the tram lines are called MetroTram. Metro lines have always been identified by an ”M“ before the line number and colored orange on maps. Metro services run at least every 10 minutes and also 24 h. Many MetroBus lines in the Western half of the city run along the routes of the West Berlin tram network, which was closed in 1976.

=== Braunschweig ===
Braunschweig had a mixed MetroBus and MetroTram network from 2008 to 2015. Lines ran at least every 10 to 15 minutes on weekdays and every 30 minutes in the evenings and on Sunday. Originally, the network comprised five tram and five bus services. In September 2012 this number was decreased to three tram (M1, M3 and M5) and two bus (M19 and M29) services. Since 2015 all lines operate without a brand name again.

== Gallery ==
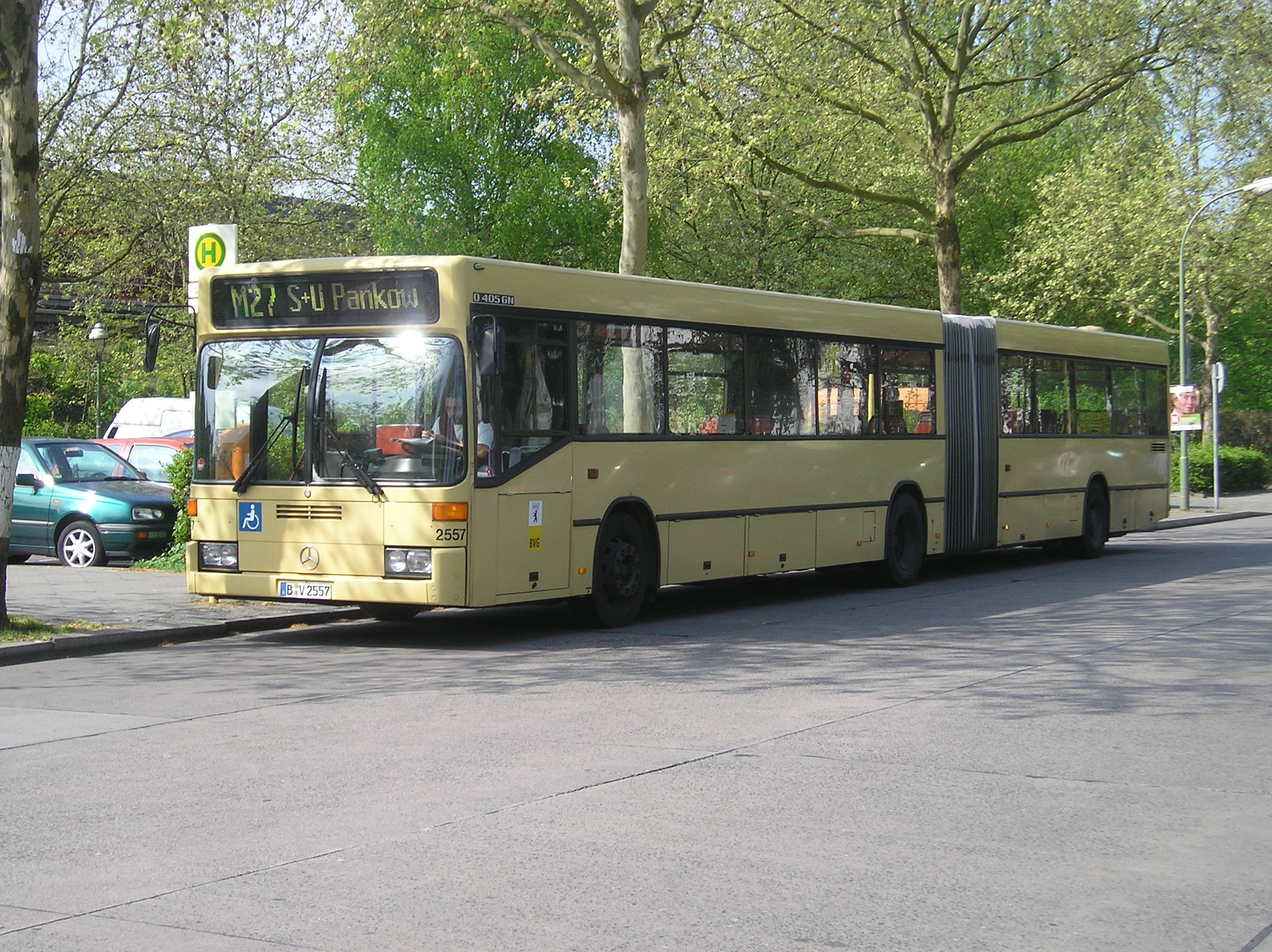
Berlin Metrobus service M 27 at Berlin Jungfernheide station

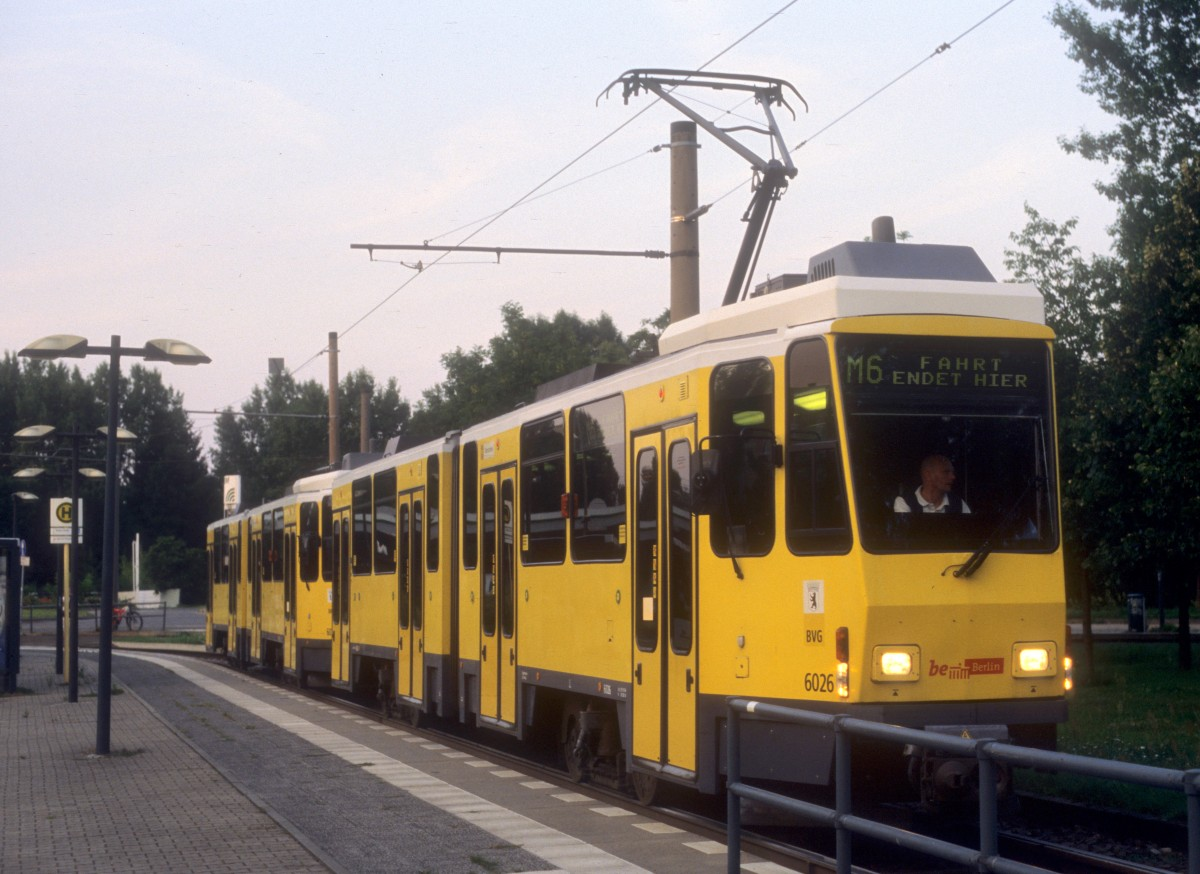
ČKD Tatra tram on service M 6 at its terminus in Berlin-Hellersdorf

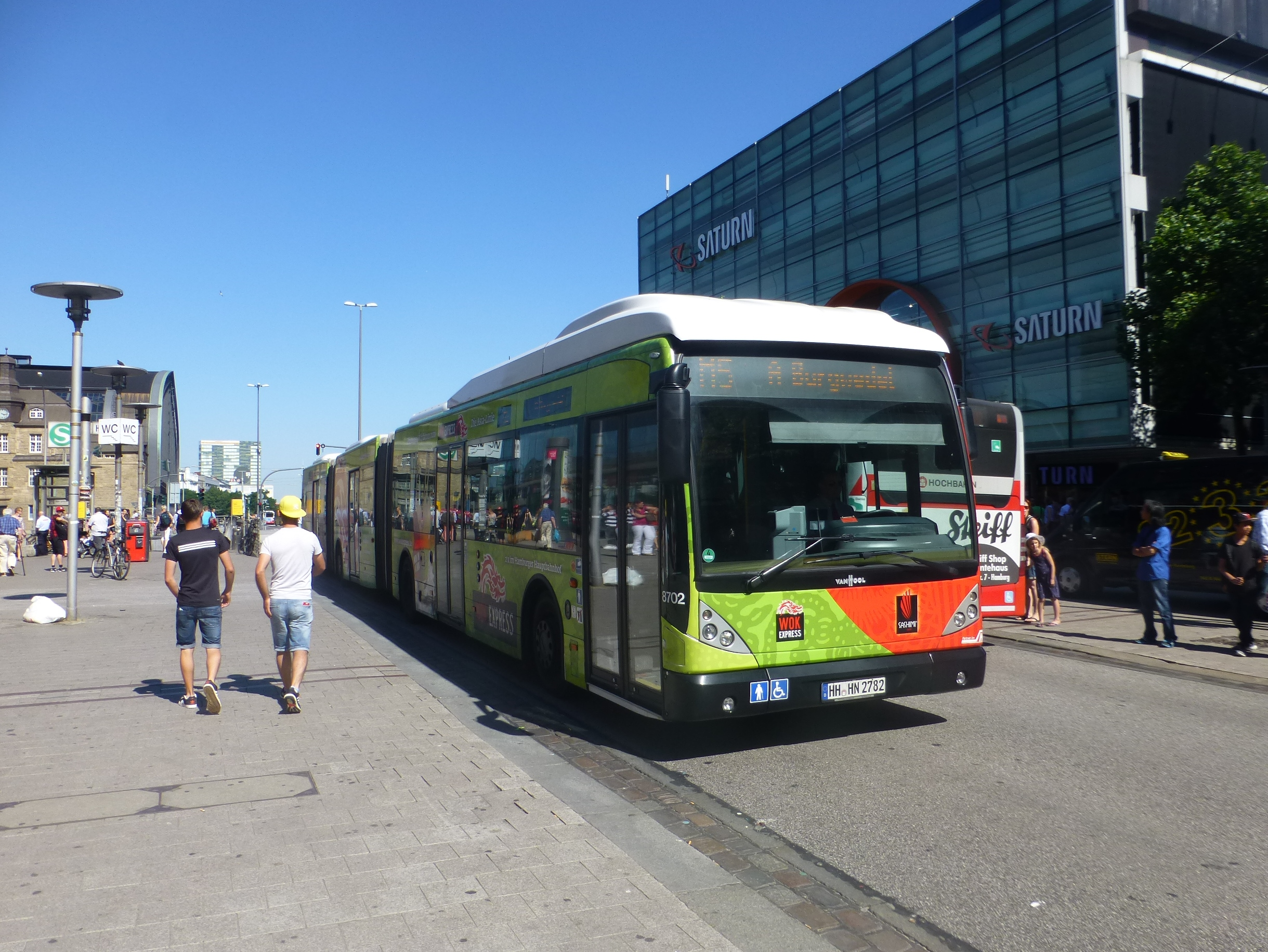
Double-articulated bus on MetroBus service M 5 on Mönckebergstraße

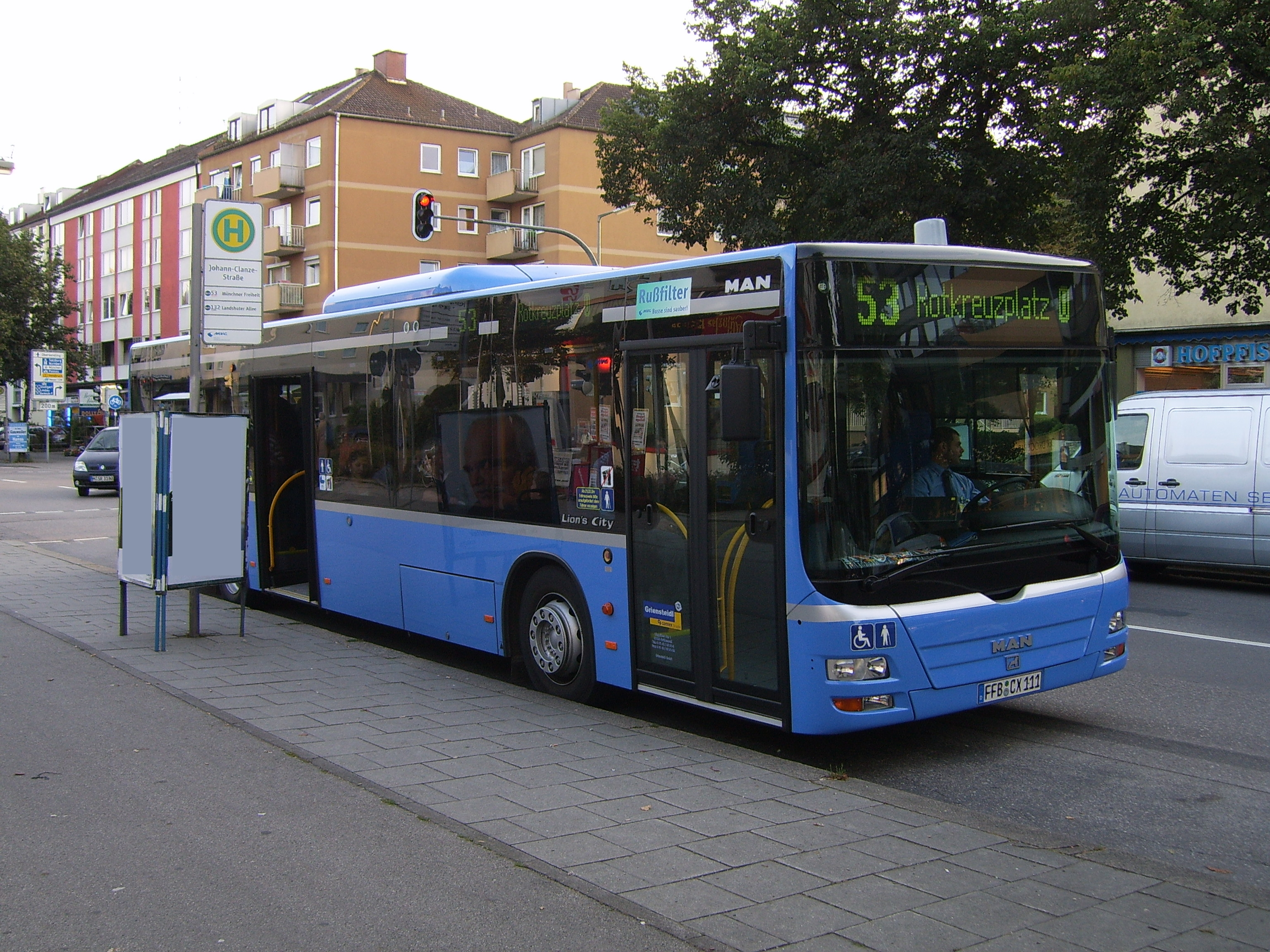
MAN bus on Munich Metrobus service 53 (lacking a special MetroBus poster)

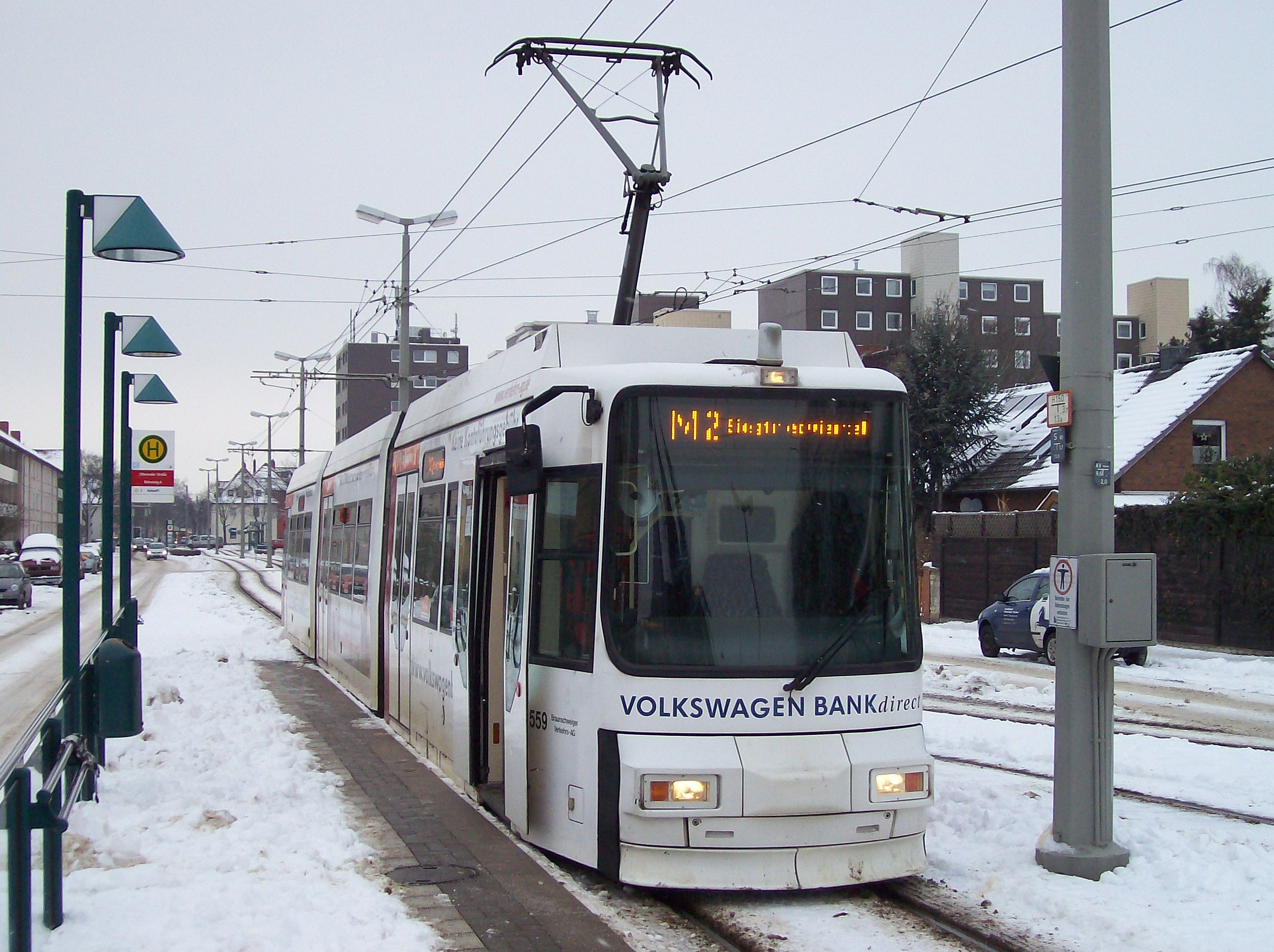
Braunschweig MetroTram service M 2
