= Saurer 6DM =

Swiss heavy truck model

Saurer 6DM 4x4
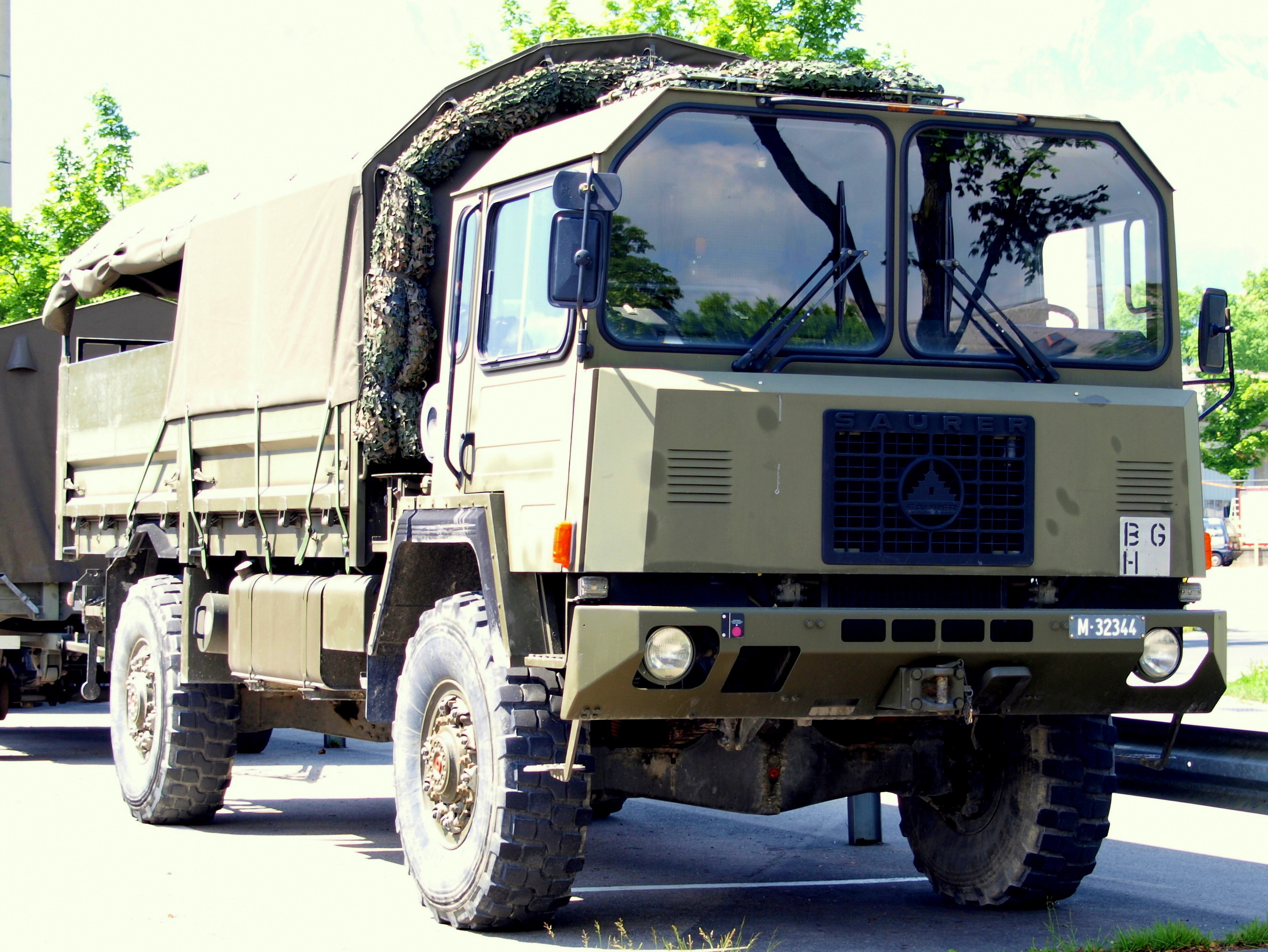
- Swiss Army Saurer 6DM
- Place of origin: Switzerland

Service history
- In service: 1983 - Present
- Used by: Switzerland

Production history
- Designer: Adolph Saurer AG
- Designed: 1982
- Manufacturer: Saurer
- Produced: 1983 - 1987
- No. built: 550 + 250 with winch

Specifications
- Mass: 10000kg
- Length: 7.7m
- length: 4.35m(wheelbase)
- Width: 2.5m
- Height: 3.17m with cavan 3.44m
- Crew: 1+ 1Pax in cabin + 36Pax on the bridge
- Engine: Saurer, Typ D4 KT- M 250PS, 184kW
- Payload capacity: 6000kg
- Transmission: FBW PG 10 ZF A 800/3D
- Suspension: 4x4 wheeled
- Fuel capacity: 360 liters (with winch only 300 liters)
- Maximum speed: 80 km/h

The Saurer 6DM is a heavy truck manufactured by Adolph Saurer AG.

The name 6DM reflects its 6 tonne payload. The two-axle vehicle has a power output of 250 hp. The driving Formula 4x4 is driven 4 of 4 existing wheels. Its bigger "brother", the Saurer 10DM, has 3 axes (6-Wheel), a 10 tonne payload and 320 hp.

The vehicles are equipped with Saurer six-cylinder engines and turbochargers are connected via a semi-automatic transmission. Some units are equipped with a winch, which costs 60 liters of fuel capacity.

The 6DM and 10DM were the first military vehicles of the Swiss Army, which went into operation with NATO structure. The most widespread are flatbeds with tarp for troops and supplies, but they also serve as fire engines for military airfields. The firefighting version includes the special F/A-18C Maquette device. It also serves as a crane truck and as container transporter for the operating components for TAFLIR (tactical aircraft radar). As these trucks reach the end of their useful life they are replaced by trucks from Iveco.

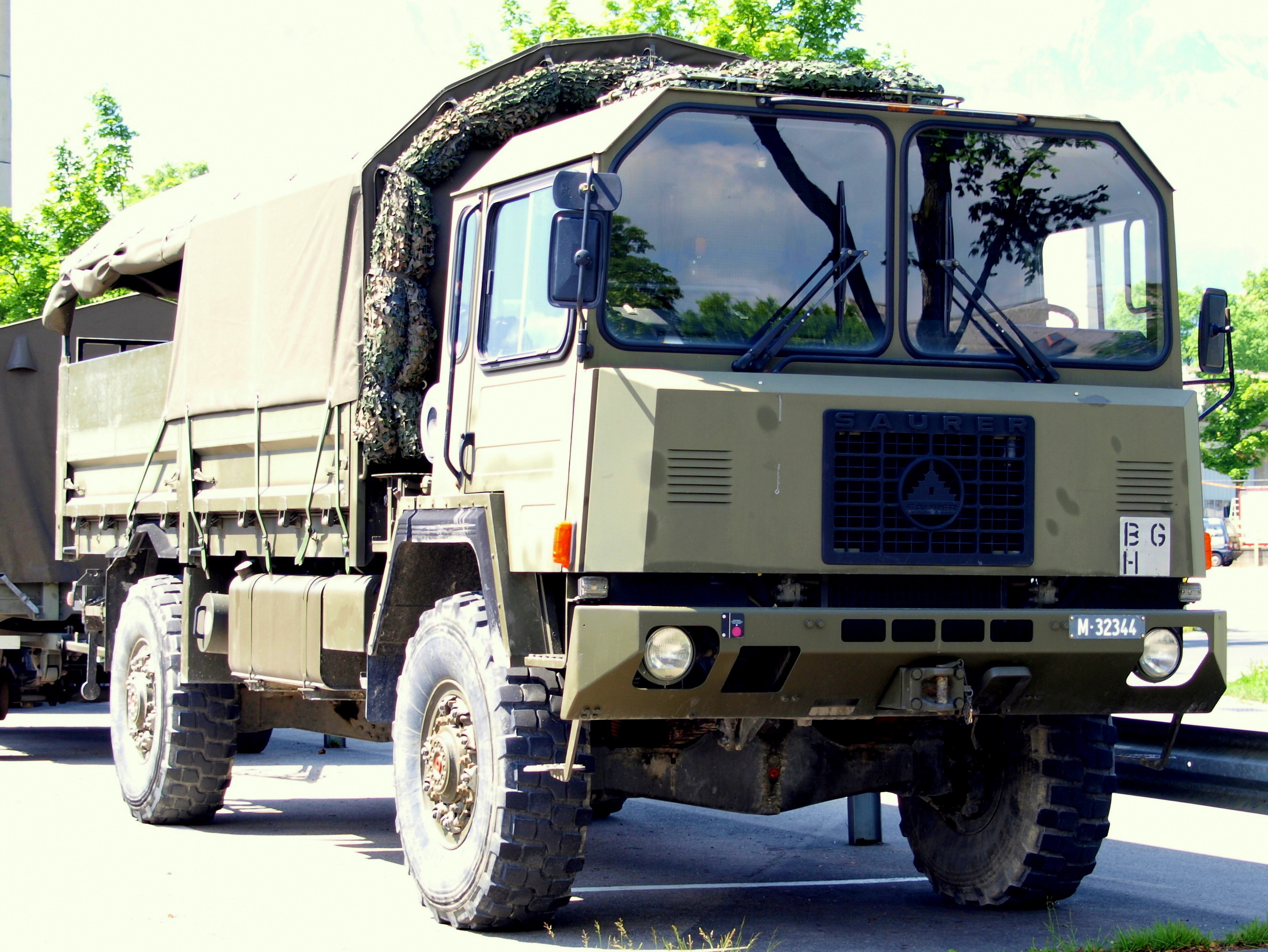
Saurer 6DM

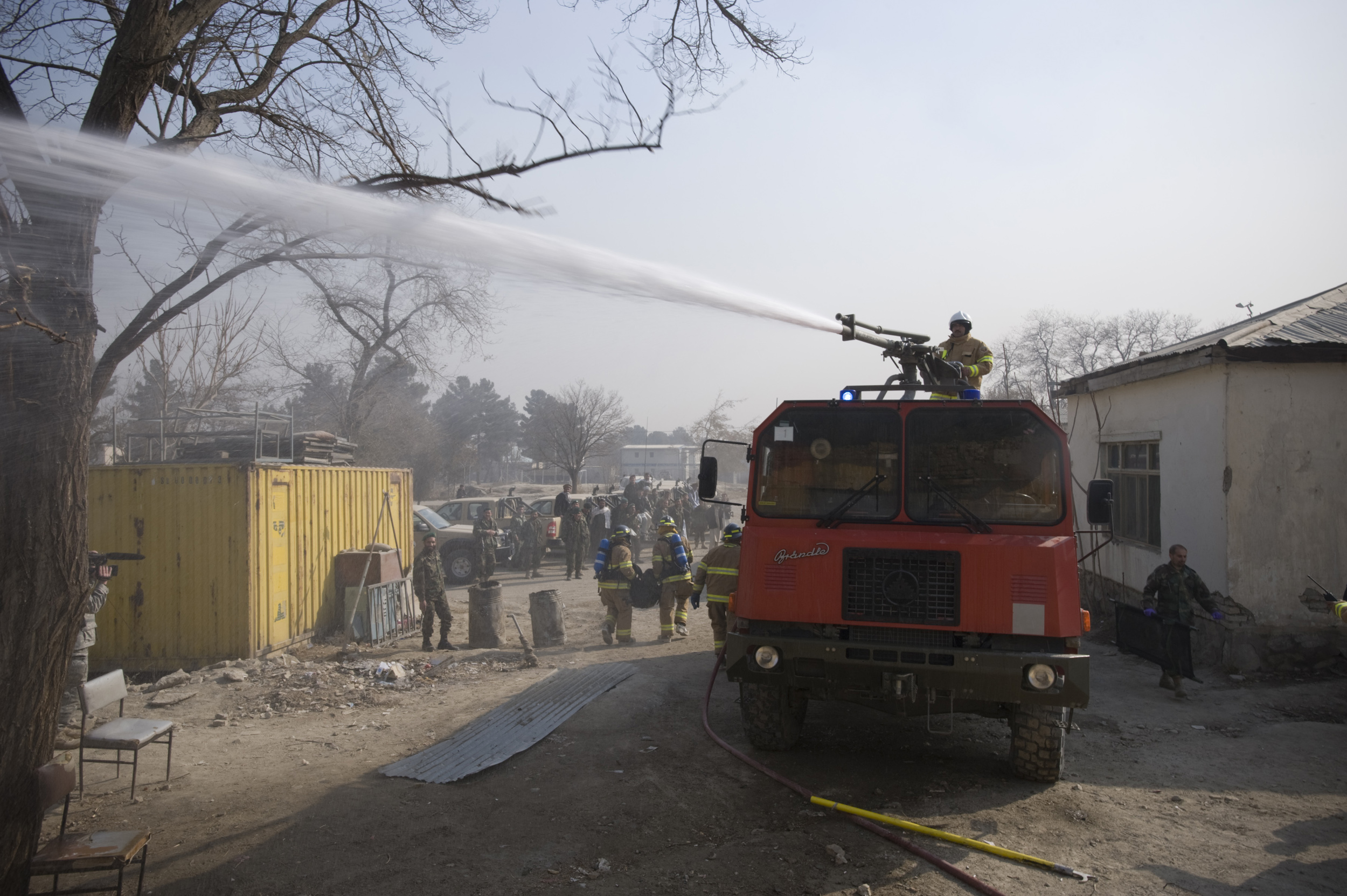
Firefighting vehicle Saurer 6DM in Afghanistan

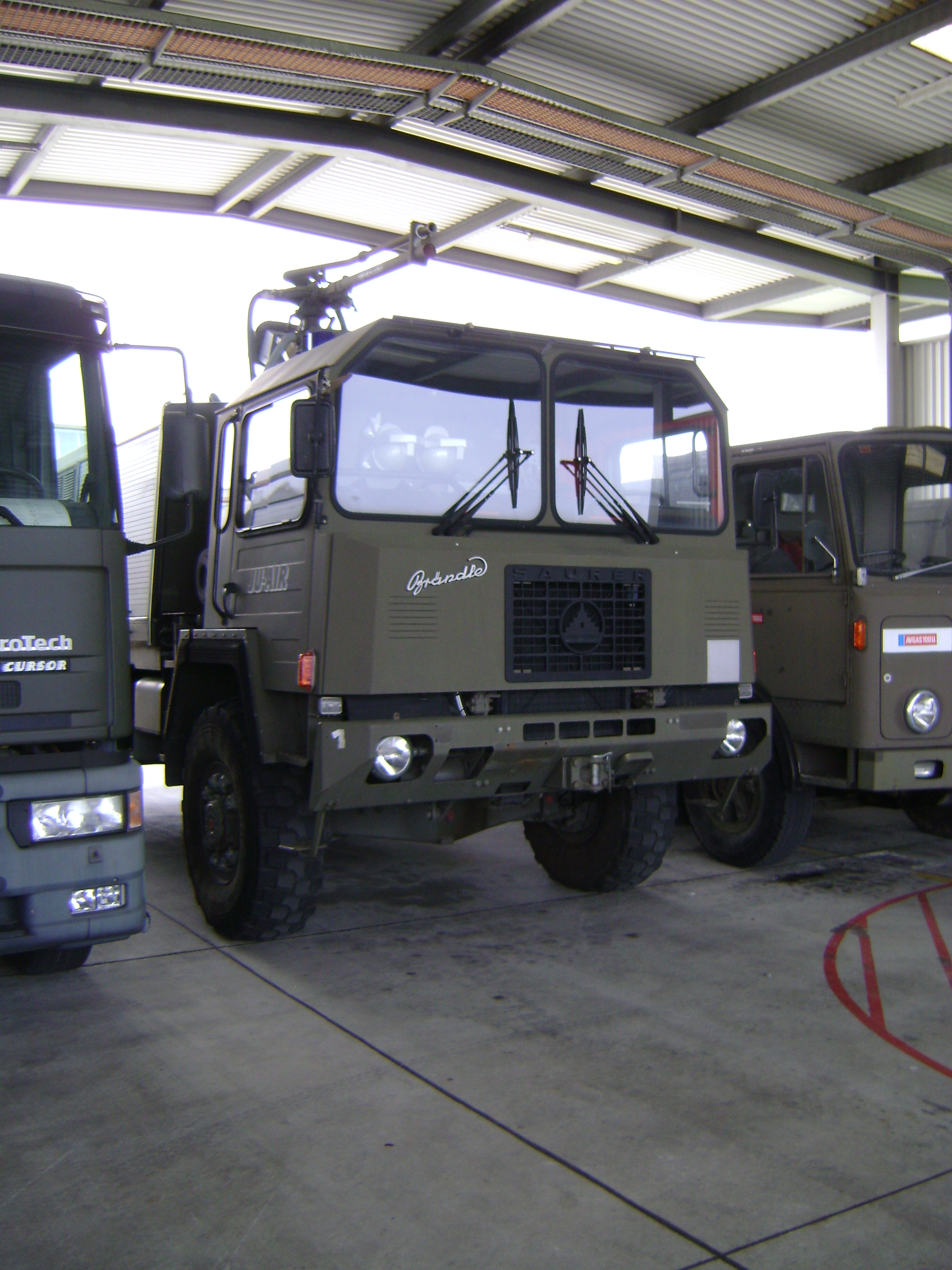
Saurer 6DM military airfield firefighting vehicle

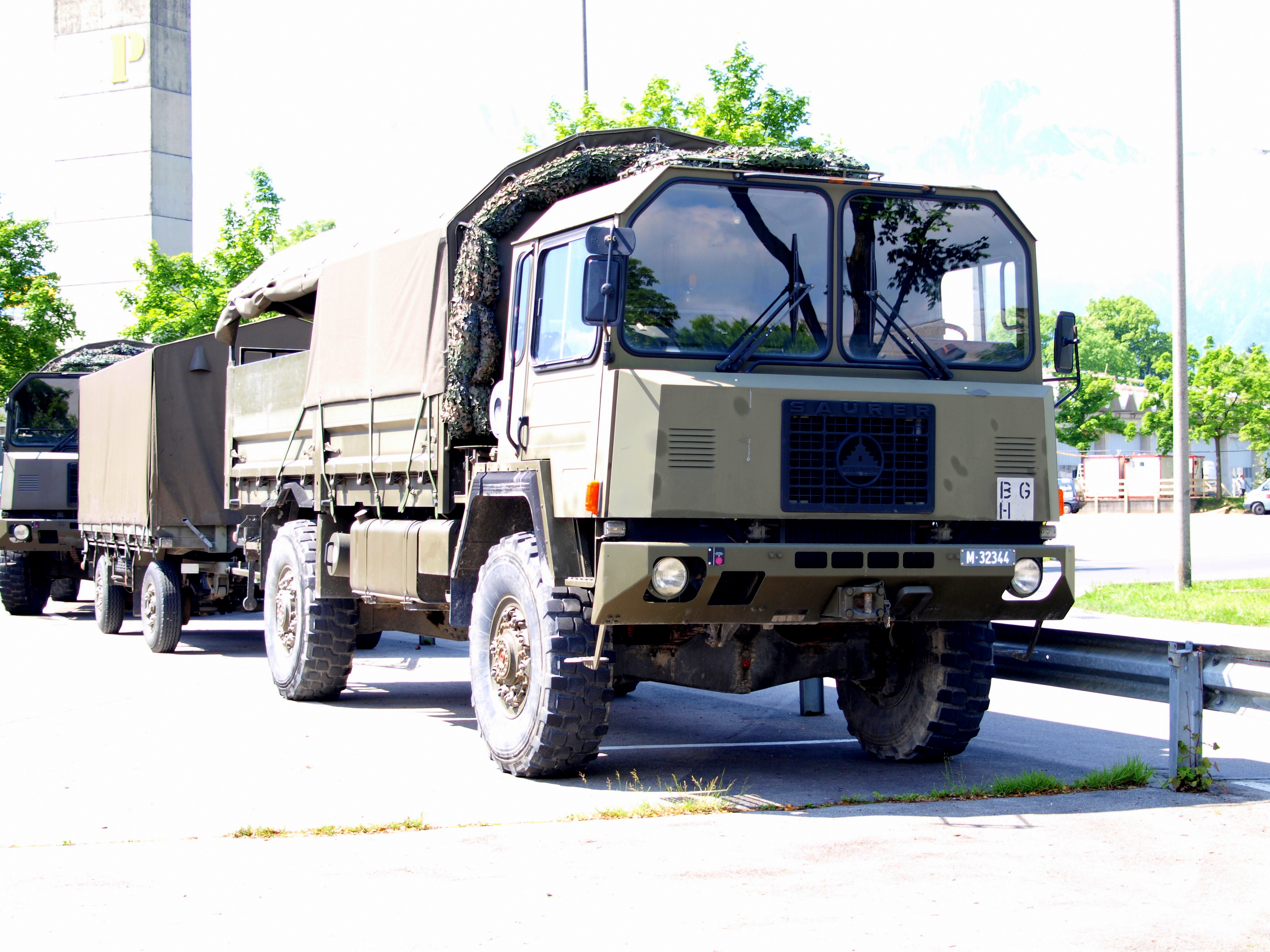
Saurer 6DM with trailer
