= Saurer 10DM =

Saurer 10DM, 6x6
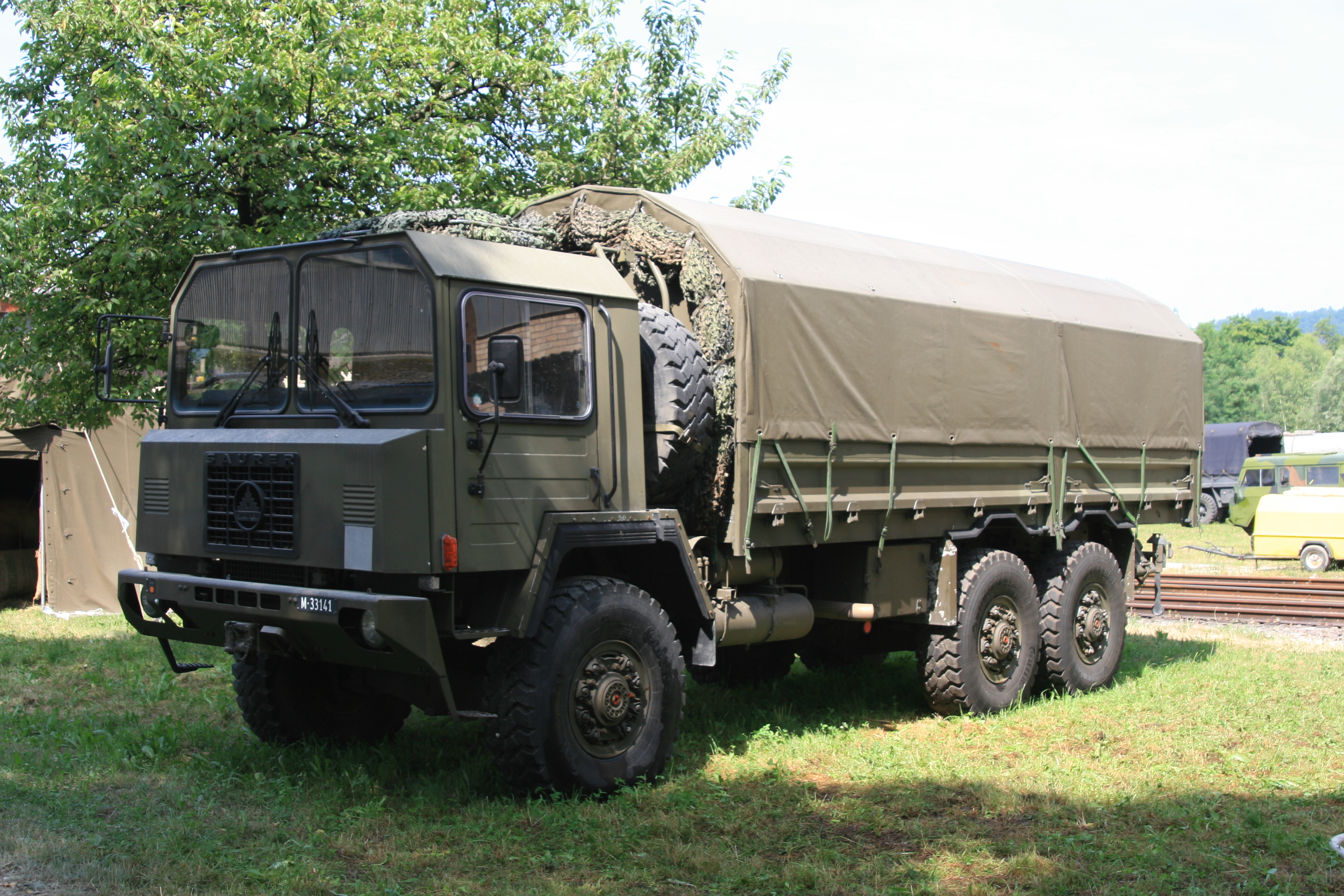
- Swiss Army Saurer 10DM
- Place of origin: Switzerland

Service history
- In service: 1983 - Present
- Used by: Switzerland

Production history
- Designer: Adolph Saurer AG
- Designed: 1982
- Manufacturer: Saurer
- Produced: 1983 - 1987
- No. built: 200 + 100 with winch
- Variants: Flatbed, Cran, Fireengine, Radarpost

Specifications
- Mass: 12000kg
- Length: 8.9m
- length: 4m+1,4m(wheelbase)
- Width: 2.5m
- Height: 3.17m with cavan 3.44m
- Crew: 1+ 1Pax in cabin + 44Pax on the bridge
- Engine: Saurer, Typ D4 KT- M 320PS, 235kW
- Payload capacity: 10000kg
- Transmission: FBW PG 10 ZF A 800/3D
- Suspension: 10DM 6x6 wheeled
- Fuel capacity: 360 liters (with winch only 300 liters)
- Maximum speed: 80 km/h

The Saurer 10DM is the last heavy truck model, which was manufactured by the Adolph Saurer AG.

The name 10DM stands for 10 t payload. The three-axle vehicle has a power output of 320 hp. The driving Formula 6x6 is driven 6 of 6 existing wheels. Its lighter "brother", the Saurer 6DM, has accordingly 2 axes (4-Wheel) and a 6 tonne payload and 250 hp.

The vehicles are equipped with Saurer six-cylinder engines and turbochargers are connected via a semi-automatic transmission. Some of the 6DM and 10DM are equipped with a winch, the 6DM and 10DM with a winch have a 60l less fuel capacity.

The models 6DM and 10DM were the first military vehicles of the Swiss Army, which went into operation with NATO structure. The most widespread are the 6DM and 10DM truck as flatbed with tarp for troops and supplies, but they also exist as fire engines for military airfields. The firefighting version practice the firefighting with the special F/A-18C Maquette device, as a crane truck, and as container transporter for the operating components for TAFLIR (tactical aircraft radar) also TAFLIR radar antennae are mounted on 10DM trucks.

As these trucks have reached the end of their useful life and spare parts are getting scarce, they are being phased out and are replaced by trucks from Iveco since 2013.

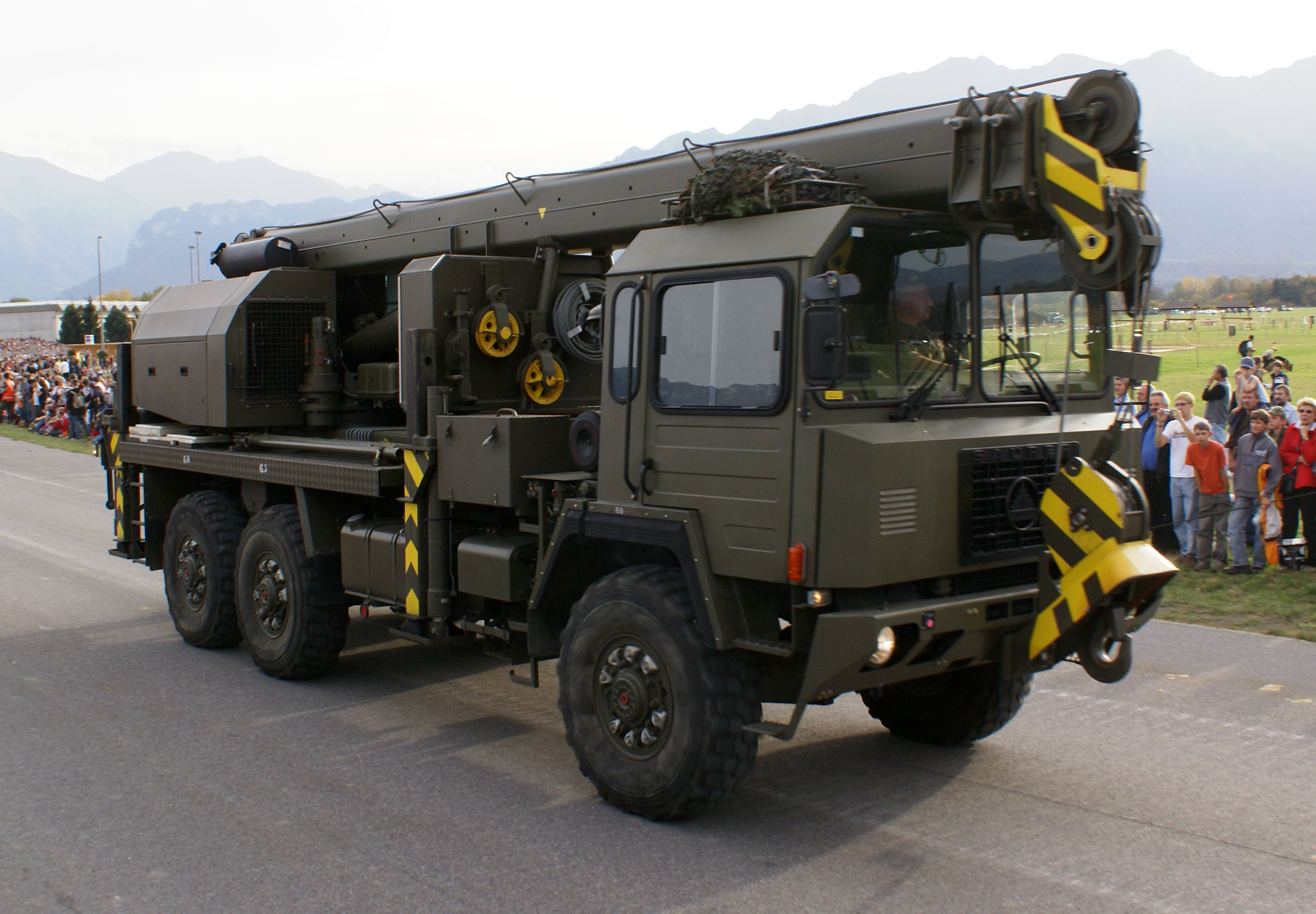
Saurer 10DM Cran

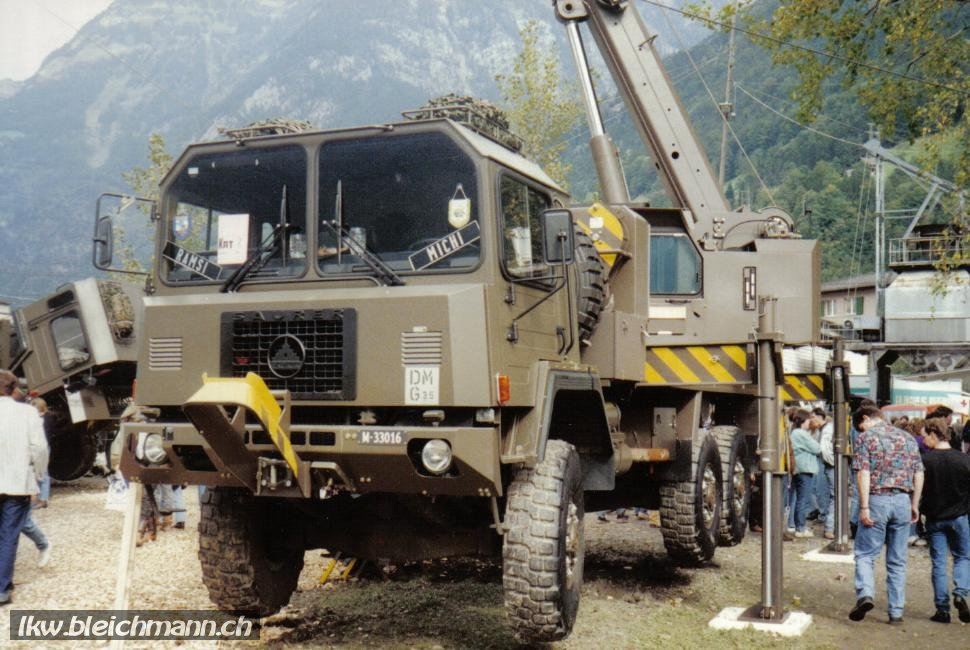
Saurer 10DM Gottwald Cran

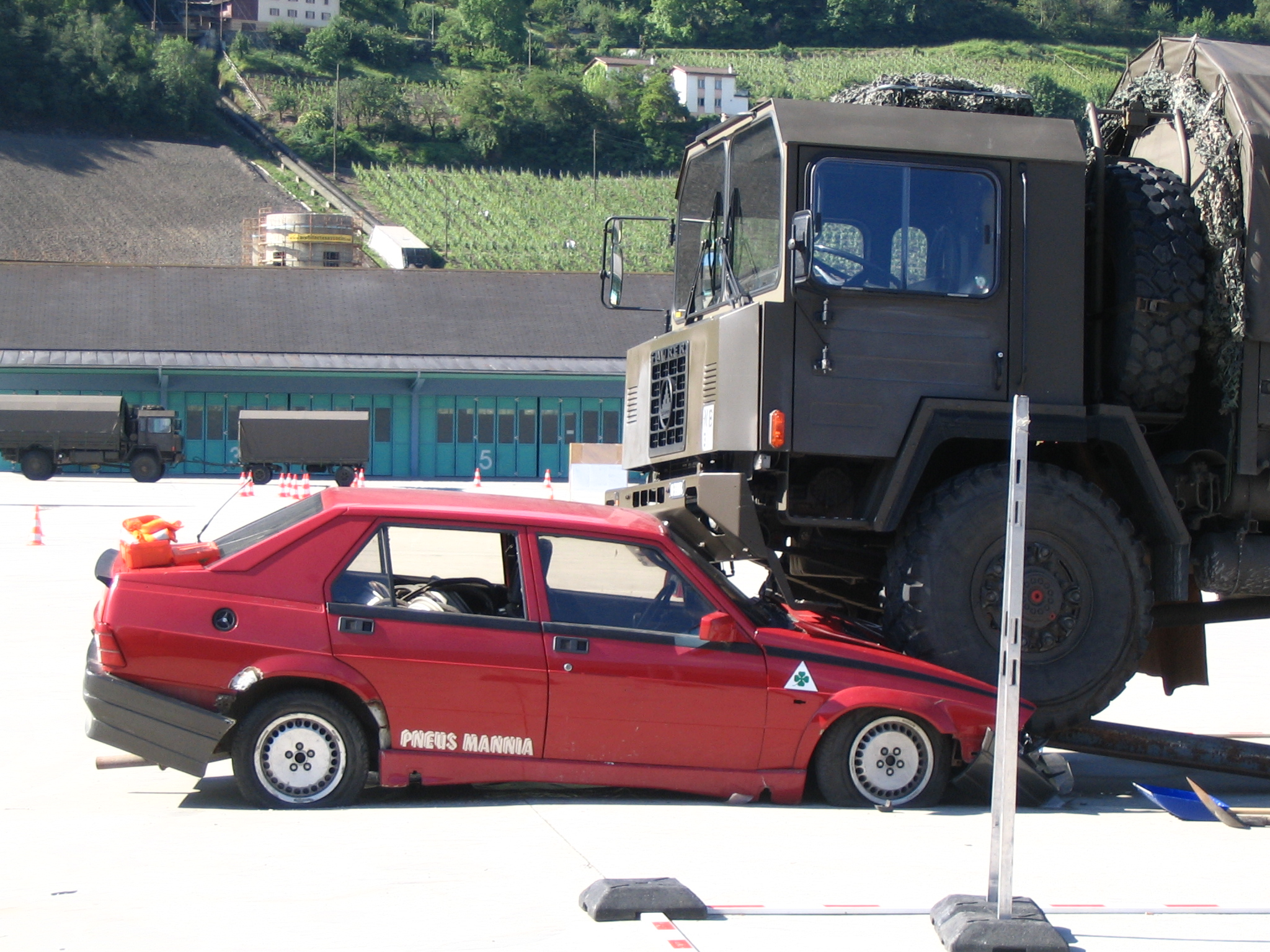
accident simulation

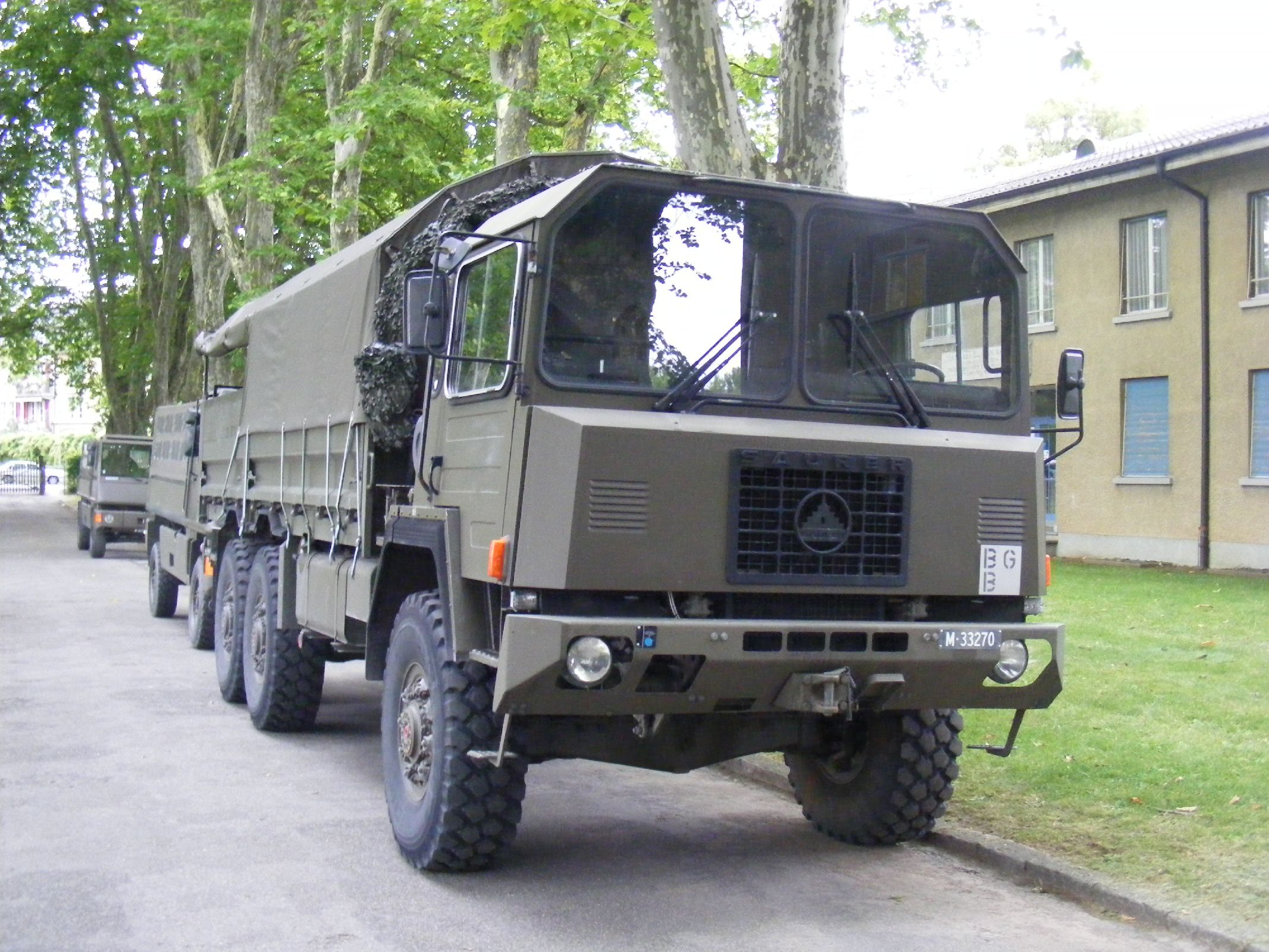
Saurer 10DM

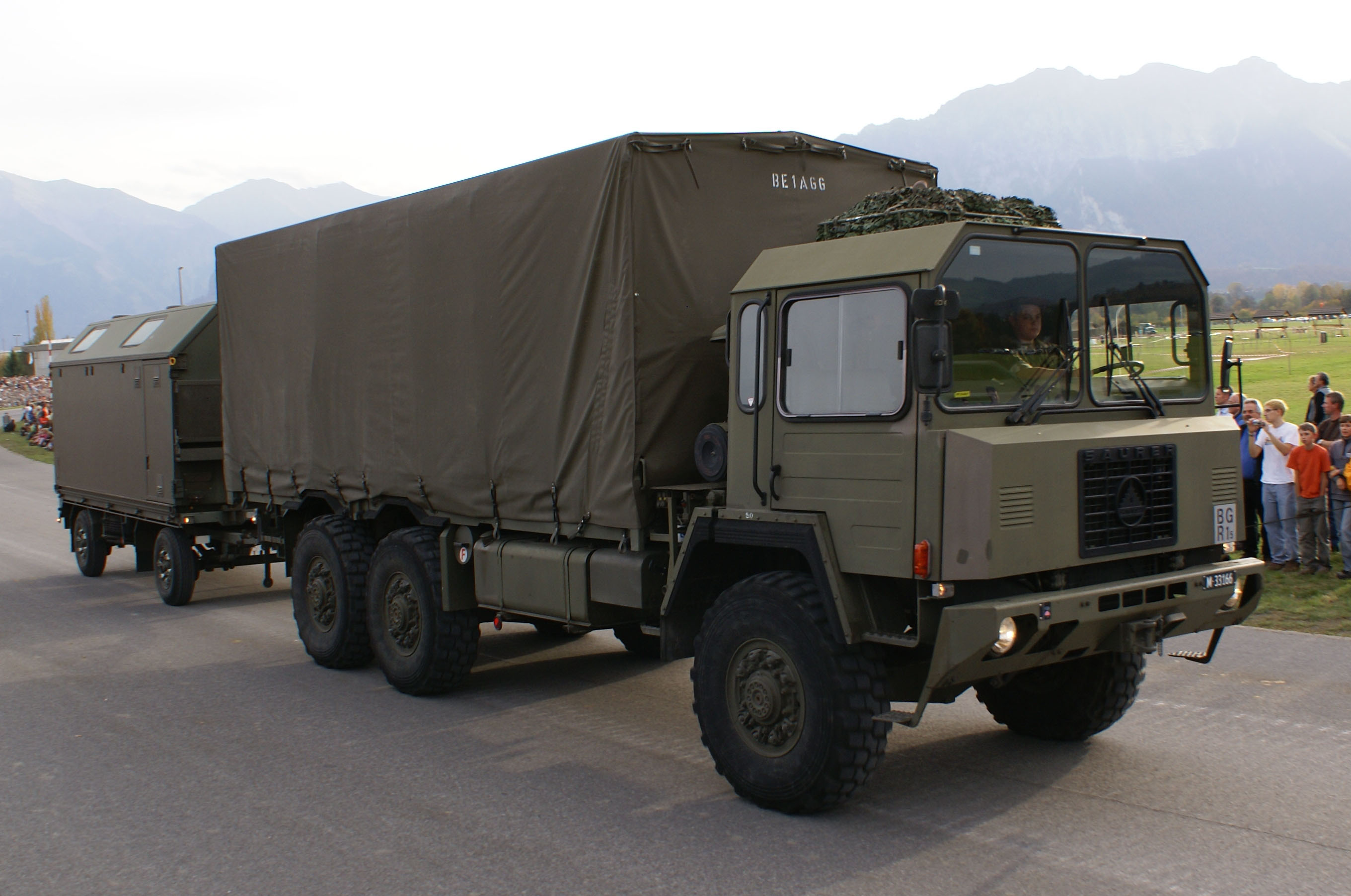
Saurer 10DM big roof

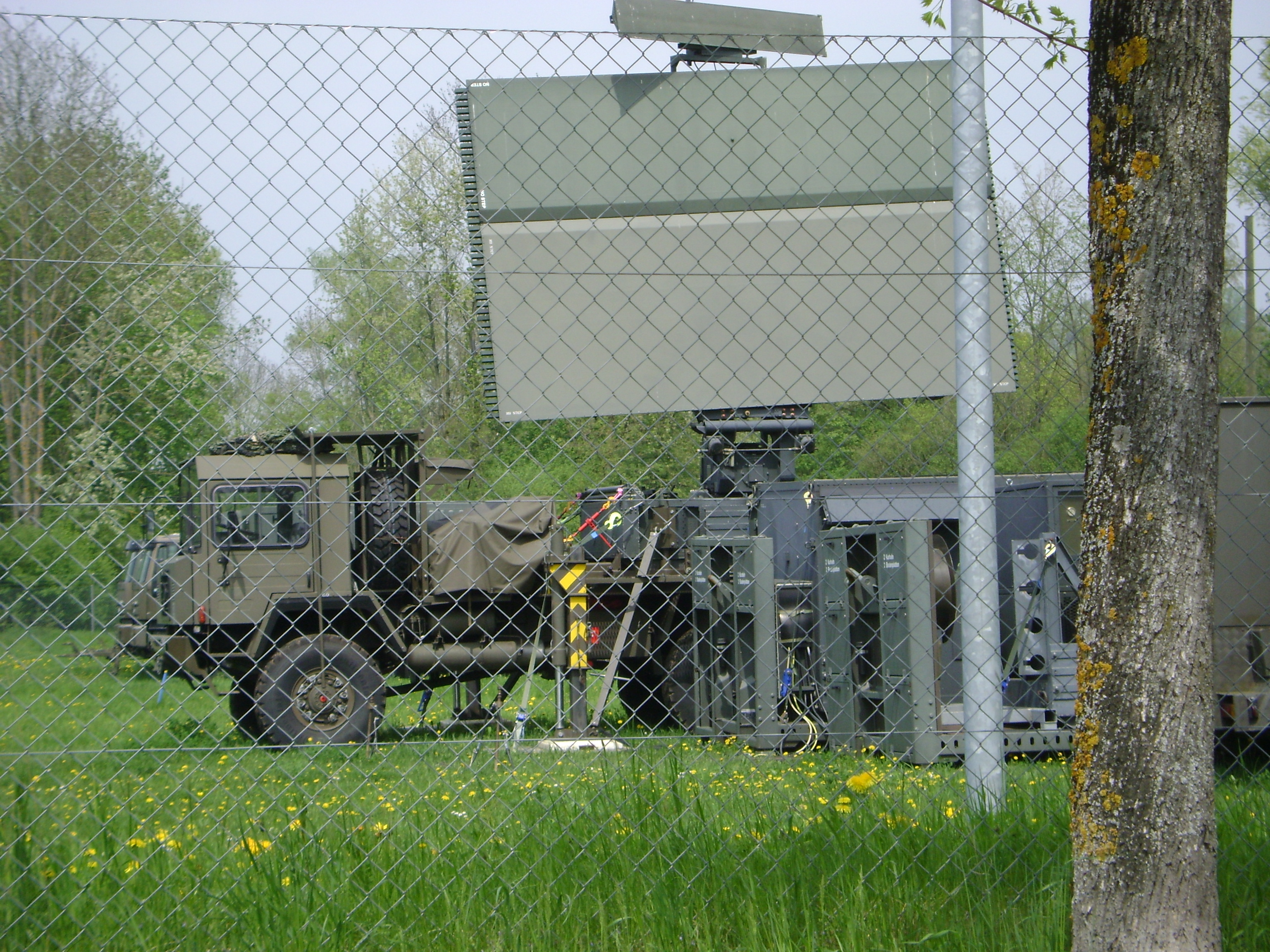
Saurer 10DM TAFLIR
