= Variants of the M113 armored personnel carrier =

List of US APC variants

M113 armored personnel carrier variants were created for a variety of uses such as transporting infantry and nuclear missiles. The M113 armored personnel carrier has become one of the most prolific armored vehicles of the second half of the 20th century, and is still used by various armies around the world.

== Military operators ==
=== Afghanistan ===
In 2005, Afghanistan received 15 second-hand M577A2 command and control vehicles from the United States.

=== Argentina ===
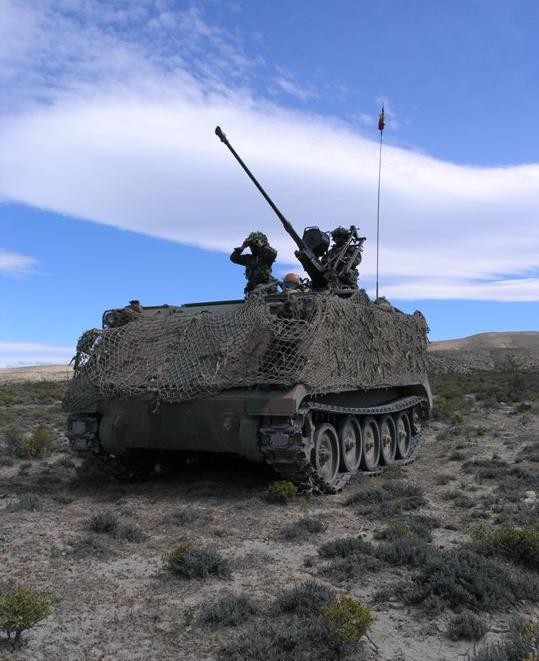
Argentine Army M113 with 20 mm GAI-BO1 gun, 2015

In 1967, the Argentine Army received from USA 250 M113A1 APC, 10 M577A1 command and control vehicles and 12 M548A1 cargo carriers. In 1992, they received from USA 200 M113A2 APC, 25 M106A1 mortar carrier, 10 M577A1 command and control vehicles and 16 M548A1 cargo carriers. Some variants are modified by the Army's Comando de Arsenales.

- M106A2 – M106A1 mortar carrier modified with a 120mm FM mortar.
- M113 Defensa Aerea – M113 APC with a 20 mm Oerlikon GAI-BO1 cannon.
- M113 Sanitario – M113 APC modified to serve as an armoured ambulance.
- M113 Recuperador – M113 APC modified to serve as an armoured recovery vehicle
- M113 Comunicaciones – M113 APC modified to serve as a communications vehicles
- M548A2 – M548A1 cargo carriers modernizated to A2 version.
- M113A2 RASIT – M113A2 APC fitted with a RASIT radar to serve as reconnaissance vehicle.
- M113A2 w/ 20 mm turret – M113A2 APC fitted with a CITEFA 20 mm turret.

=== Australia ===
Some Australian AFVs have the suffix "AS" (the NATO code for Australia), often appended by a model number.

Generally speaking, Australian models are modified from the original models, in the case of the M113A1 series this included the AN/VIC-1 communications harness, large dust filters for the passenger compartment ventilation blower, heavy steel track manufactured by ADI, provision for 600 kg of belly armor, the Cadillac-Gage T-50 turret mounting twin .30 Brownings (early service) or a .30/.50 Brownings machine guns for APC/LRV versions, a traverse bar to prevent the crew commander traversing the turret to the rear over the troop compartment roof hatch with the guns depressed low. For some reason, besides the M577A1 command vehicle, all of versions of the M113A1 had the passenger compartment heaters removed. In the late 1980s, the fleet was issued with German BM8005 image intensifying night vision driving periscopes, which, with the aid of an adaptor, could be fitted to replace the driver's central periscope for night driving. In the early 90s, the fleet was issued with VINSON family cipher equipment, typically a single KY-57 per vehicle. This allowed the command net to be enciphered, but the admin net would normally work en clair.

- M113A1 Fire Support Vehicle (FSV) – Full designation Carrier, Fire Support, Full Track M113A1 (FS) Saladin Turret was a variant fitted with the turret from the Alvis Saladin armored car. The FSV was introduced into Australian Army units in the mid-1960s following the withdrawal of the Saladins and was armed with a 76 mm gun, a .30 caliber coaxial machine gun and a .30 caliber machine gun mounted on the roof of the vehicle's turret. The M113 was an interim vehicle and was replaced by the M113 Medium Reconnaissance Vehicle in the late 1970s. It was commonly referred to by Royal Australian Armoured Corps crews as the "Beast". M113A1 FSV is still under service by Philippine Army.
- M113A1 Fitter – Armored recovery vehicle with HIAB (Hydrauliska Industri AB) crane mounted on the left side of the hull roof along with a counter weight on the opposite side of the roof. The vehicle can be armed with either the L3A4 machine gun, M60 machine gun or a M2HB .50cal machine gun.
- M113A1 Light Reconnaissance Vehicle/APC – A standard M113A1 with a Cadillac Gage T50 turret as used on the V100/V150 series of armored cars, mounting two Browning machine guns, a .30 caliber and a M2 .50 caliber machine gun. While the standard armored personnel carrier version in Australian service is also fitted with the T50 turret, it initially carried only twin .30 caliber machine guns. In later service, the LRV and APC versions both carried the 30/50 combination and the only difference between them was roles. LRVs, which carried a crew of 2 or 3 (crew commander, driver and sometimes operator/observer), were used in the sabre (recon) troops of the Cavalry regiment and the recon troop of the Armoured regiment. APCs carried a crew of 2 plus several dismounts, either infantry, assault troops, engineers or other troops. In practise, an LRV was also perfectly capable of carrying troops, though in perhaps somewhat more cramped conditions as LRVs often carried additional stores and ammunition and had seats removed and replaced with storage lockers. For a short period of time in Vietnam, the Aircraft Armaments Incorporated Model 74C Cupola/Command Station was used, but it was quickly replaced by the T50. Also used by the New Zealand Army until the M113 was replaced in 2005. The T50 turret was initially fitted with an optical sight, however in later years this was removed and the guns were solely aimed using ranging bursts of 6–10 rounds (2 tracer). The diesel burning heater is removed from the M113A1 – though numerous diggers note that this is not the case with the Australian Army's M577s (command post vehicles).
- M113A1 Medium Reconnaissance Vehicle (MRV) – Full designation Carrier, Fire Support, Full Track M113A1 (FS) Scorpion Turret was an Australian variant similar to the M113 FSV, but using the turret from the FV101 Scorpion light tank, instead of the older turret of the Saladin armoured car, that the FSV had previously used. This turret was equipped with an Image Intensifier sight for the main armament. This II sight was the first effective passive night sight fitted to an Australian AFV, giving the MRVs a night fighting capability exceeding the Leopard AS1 and all other Australian AFVs of the period. Whilst fully amphibious, the MRV was also fitted with a light sheet-metal foam-filled trim vane and side pods. These pods and the trim vane were intended to provide additional flotation and stability on the water; they provided virtually no additional armour protection. Other changes included a modified driver's hatch which pivoted toward the centre-line of the vehicle instead of opening to the rear of the driver's hatch; this feature preventing the open driver's hatch being caught on the traversing turret, as well as the fitting of the British "boiling vessel", an electric vessel for boiling water and heating rations. As indicated by the designation change, the MRVs were roled as reconnaissance vehicles and issued to the Cavalry (medium reconnaissance) regiments with each troop equipped with 3 LRV and 2 MRV; whereas the FSVs were originally issued to APC squadrons and used to provide infantry fire support. The MRV replaced the FSV in Australian service. M113A1 MRV served in the Australian Army until 1996.
- M113AS3 – significantly upgraded M113A1 with new engine, transmission, steering, suspension, brakes and hull protection.
- M113AS4 – upgraded to the same standard as the AS3, lengthened to fit an additional road wheel station and fitted with a new Tenix Defence designed electronically driven "one man turret" with 12.7mm heavy machine gun and sight.
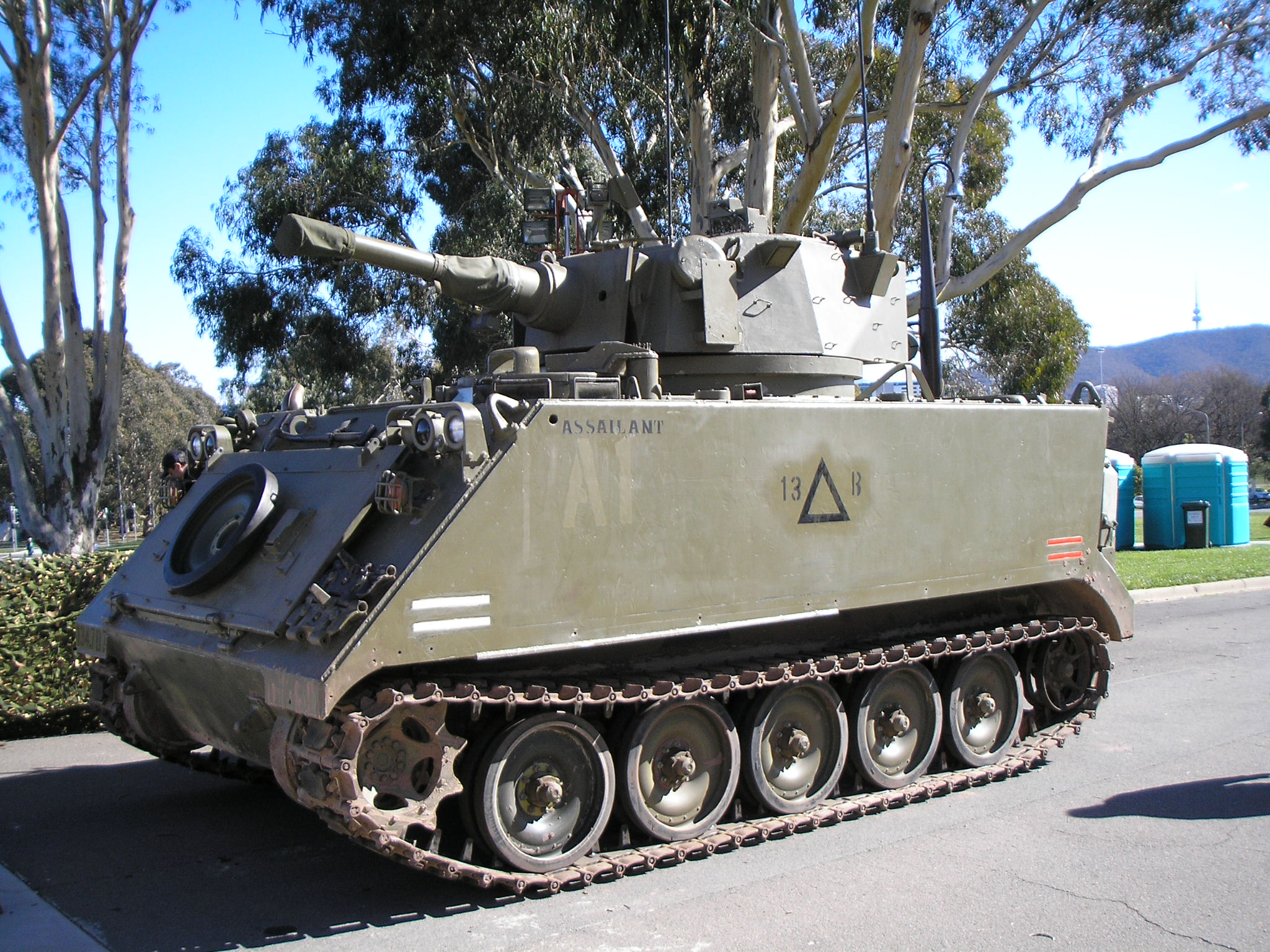
Australian M113A1 FSV

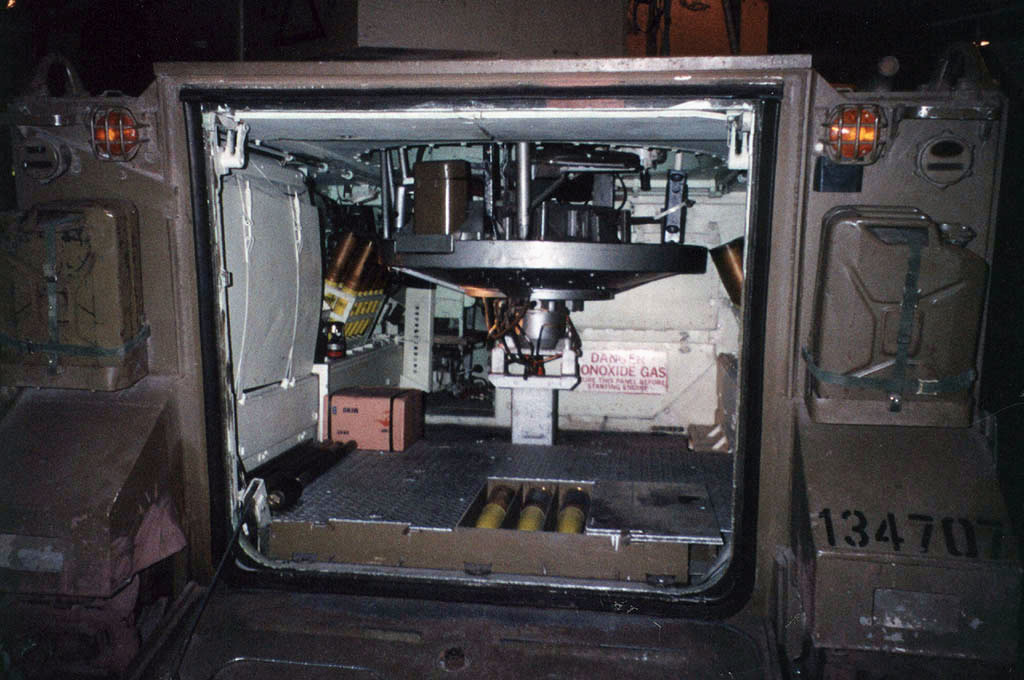
Interior of FSV with Saladin turret

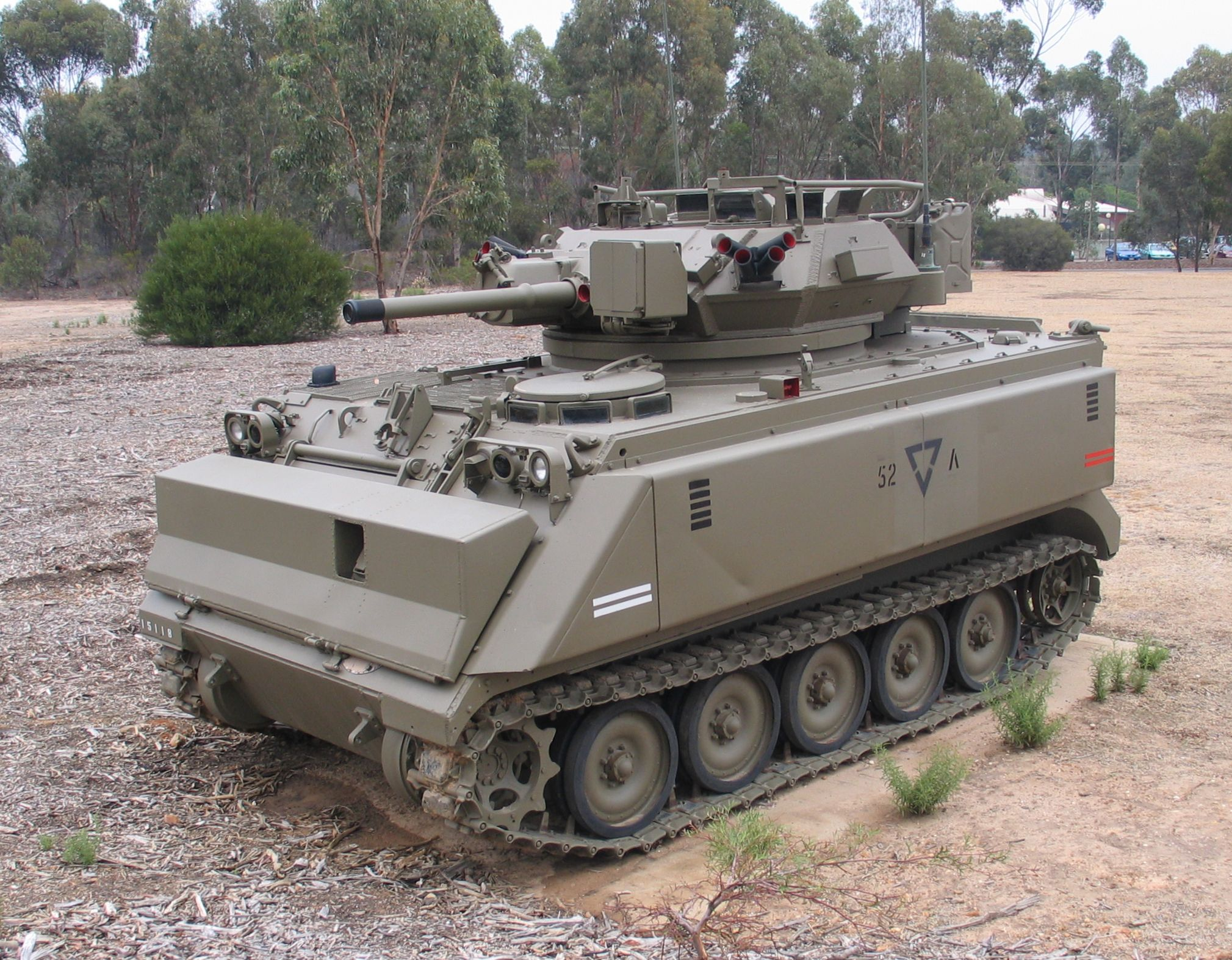
Australian M113 MRV.

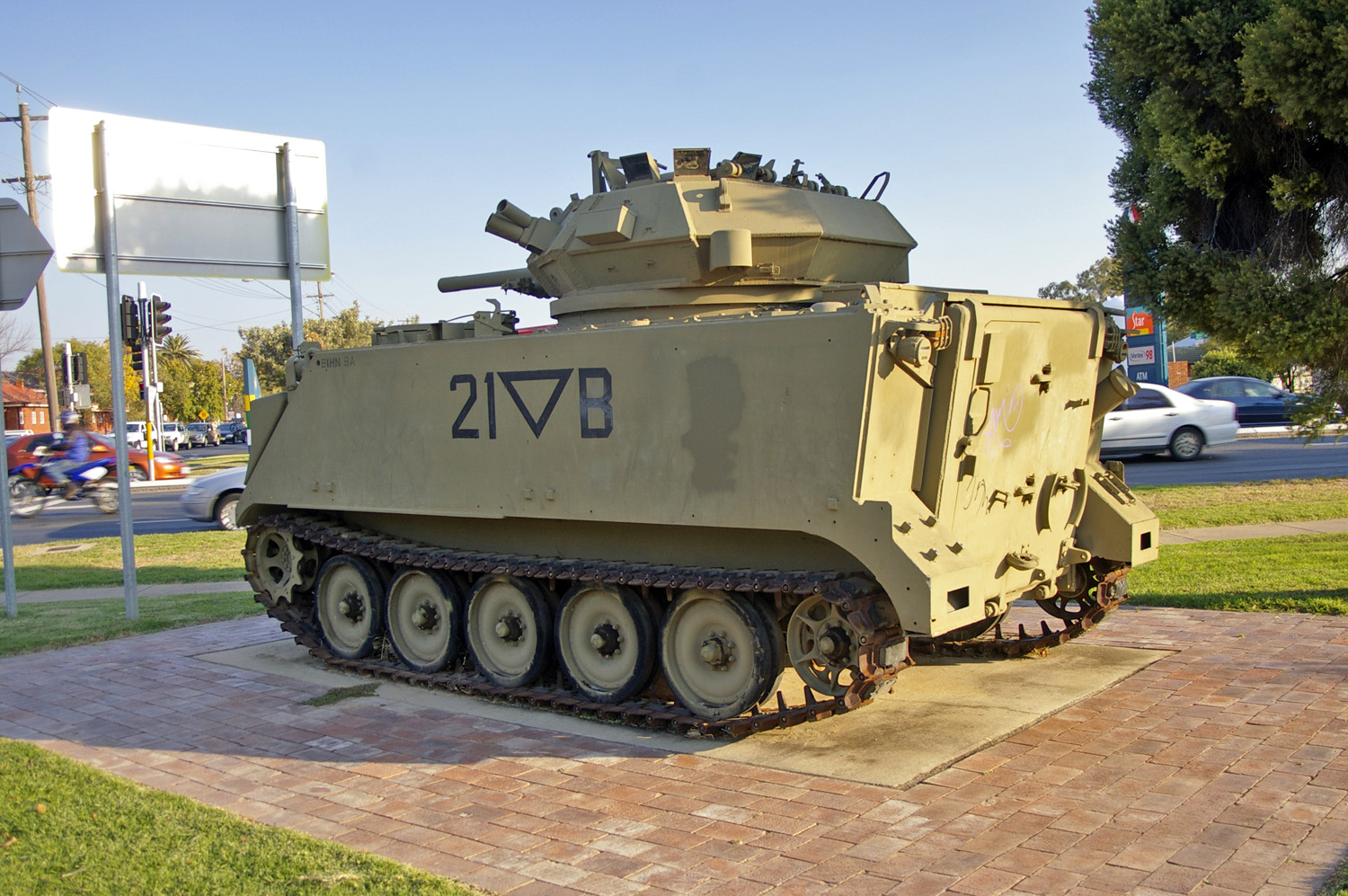
Australian "Scorpion" M113A1 MRV

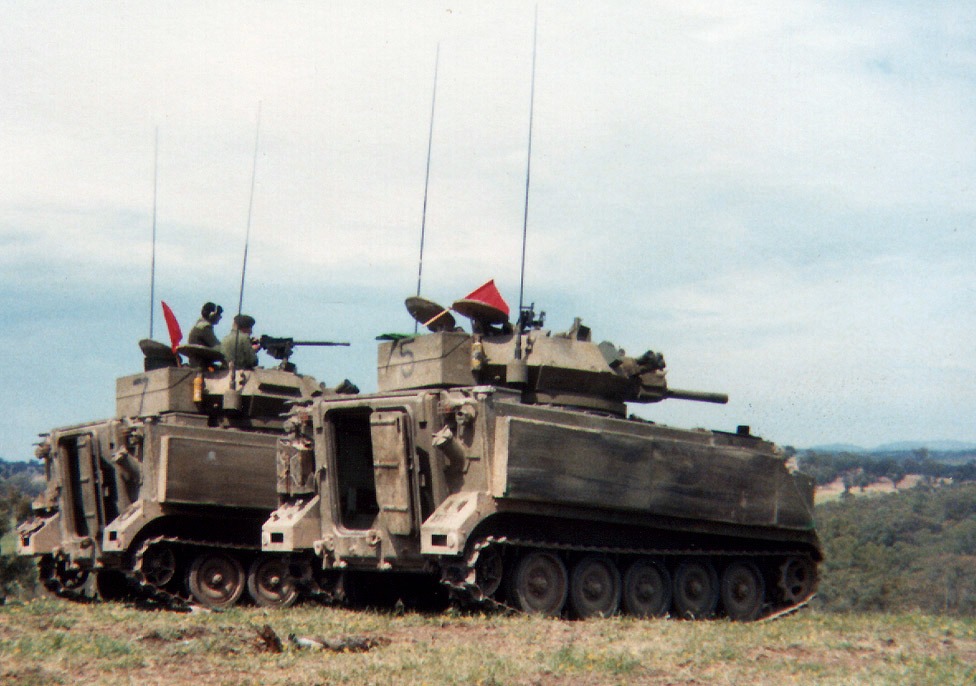
M113A1 MRVs

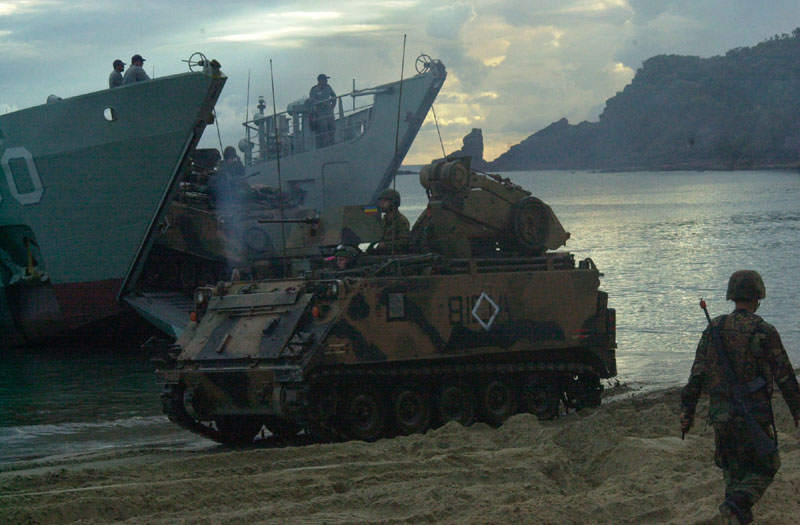
M113 Fitter

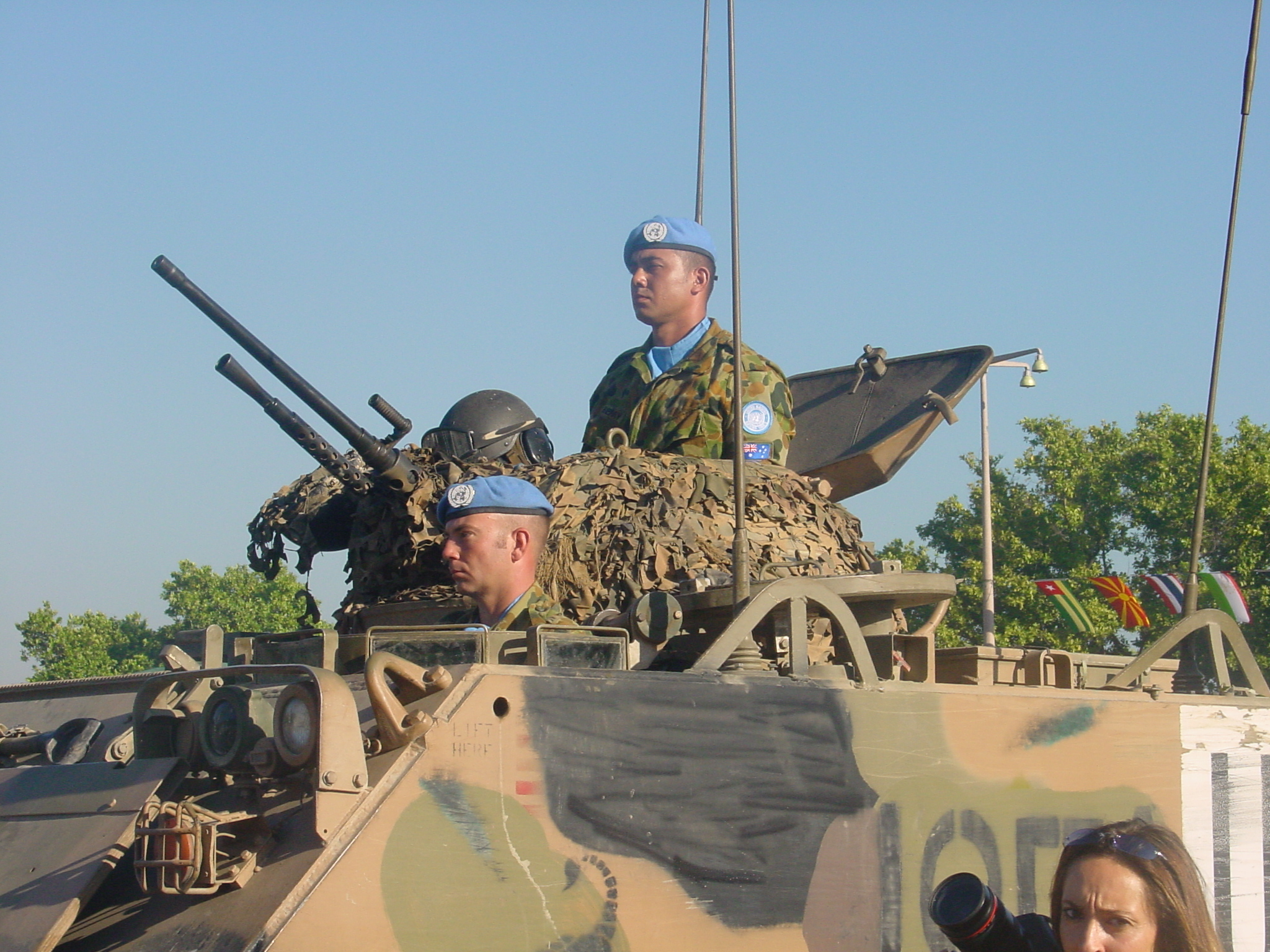
M113A1, T50 turret

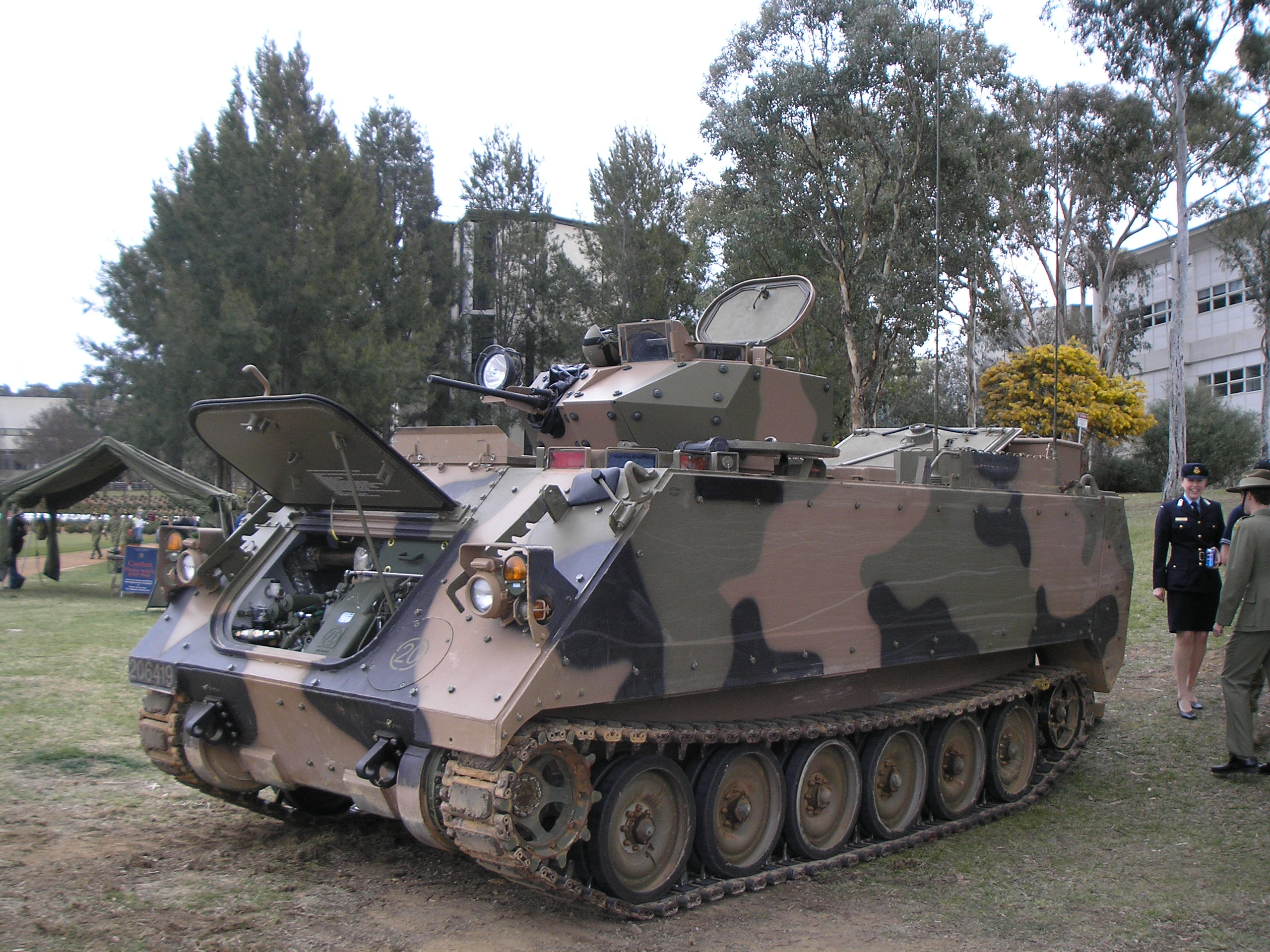
An M113AS4

=== Brazil ===
- M113B – Basic M113 modified by Motopeças, of São Paulo. The original Chrysler 75M petrol engine was changed to one Mercedes-Benz OM352A diesel engine, with 180 hp. Transmission and other parts are changed too.
- M113BR – Modernization of M113B, made by BAE Systems and the Brazilian Army's Parque Regional de Manutenção/5 (Regional Maintenance Park nº5), in Curitiba. Is a version of M113A2 Mk.1 modernization pack, of BAe Systems, fitted with a Detroit Diesel 6V53T engine, with 265 hp, Allison TX100-1A cross-drive transmission, Harris FALCON III radios and Thales SOTAS intercom.
- M113-T – Proposed modernization of M113B by Tractto, Medianeira Mecânica and UFSM. Fitted with a MWM engine.
- M577A2 – Command and control version of M113A2, donated by the US. 34 delivered in September 2016.

=== Belgium ===
BMF from Belgium has built the M113A1 with some modifications (using the suspension of the M113A2, NBC protection system etc.) under license as the M113A1-B, The Belgian army received 525 vehicles from 1982.

- M113A1-B-ATK – Basic APC version with M2HB .50cal machine gun. This type is no longer used and most have been modified into new versions.
- M113A1-B-Amb – Ambulance with room for 4 litters. This type is unarmed but is fitted with six 76mm smoke grenade launchers.
- M113A1-B-CP – Command post vehicle that retains the low roofline of the basic version.
- M113A1-B-ENG – Squad vehicle for combat engineers. Some of the 113 delivered are fitted with an hydraulic dozerblade.
- M113A1-B-TRG – Driver trainer.
- M113A1-B-MIL – Tank hunter with pintle-mounted MILAN and two 71mm Lyran mortars. All 56 vehicles have been modified into artillery FO vehicles.
- M113A1-B-Mor – The original version was used to carry the M30 4.2" mortar, but all 35 vehicles have been upgraded to tow the Thompson-Brandt MO-120-RT 120 mm mortar.
- M113A1-B-MT – Maintenance vehicle with folding work table on the right rear.
- M113A1-B-MTC – Maintenance vehicle with hydraulic HIAB crane. Similar to the M579.
- M113A1-B-Rec – recovery vehicle with a heavy internal winch. Similar to M806.
- M113A1-B-SCB – Carrier vehicle for mast-mounted battlefield surveillance (Surveillance de Champ de Bataille) radar EL/M-2130A.
- M113A1-B-TACP – Modified command post vehicle for dedicated TACP missions.
- M113A1-B-VW – Former MILAN carrier that is now used by artillery forward observers. It retains the .50cal machine gun on the 3rd cupola behind the driver, but the commander's cupola has the MILAN post replaced by a portable laser range finder MLR-N61.
- AIFV – A development of the M113A1 APC, upgraded with an enclosed turret and firing ports.

=== Canada ===
Models in service:

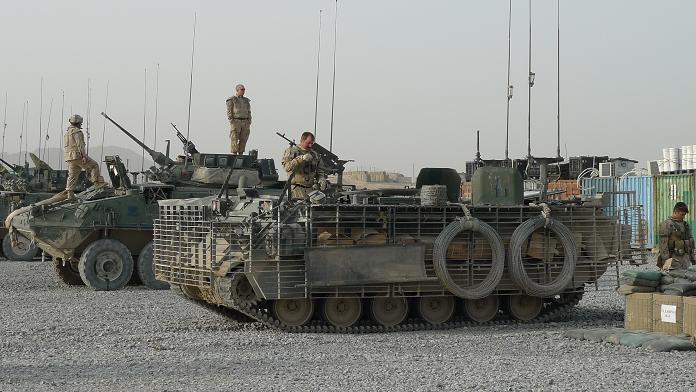
MTVL fitted with a RWS and fitted with cage armor in Afghanistan, 2010. Also note the two ACAV shields on the top of the rear half of the vehicle, which look to have had the slots in the center for weapons covered up.

Under the Armoured Personnel Carrier Life Extension (APCLE) program otherwise known as M113LE Project, which was started after the 1994 White Paper on Defence, it was originally planned that 341 Canadian M113A2 series vehicles were to be upgraded under the contract issued in 2000: 183 were to be stretched by 50 cm and fitted with 6 road wheels and a one-piece rubber Band Track (which is prone to slipping off the running gear during high speed turns) as part of the MTVL (Mobile Tactical Vehicle Light) series upgrade. The remaining 158 vehicles were to be upgraded to M113A3 standards, retaining 5 road wheels. An optional additional order of 61 air defence vehicles either to the MTVL or M113A3 standard of upgrades for both existing M113A2 ADATS and to convert additional APCs for use as ADATS platforms was also considered. The program underwent three reductions including scrapping the optional ADATS update order and it reduced the total number of vehicles down to 254 vehicles, with just 112 MTVL standard and 142 M113A3 standard being produced starting in 2002.

Modifications for the MTVL series and M113A3 series include a more powerful Detroit Diesel 6V-53TIA series Detroit Diesel Electronic Control (DDEC) IV electronic engine (which allows the user to electronically tune the engine to a desired rating up to 400 hp), upgraded suspension, additional fuel tanks that were added under the floor of the vehicle (In addition to the existing rear exterior fuel tanks, both of which now had special fuel cells designed not to rupture in an anti-tank mine blast) increasing the fuel tank capacity to 757 litres, bolt-on steel armour plates, replacement of the previous lever based steering with a steering wheel, the option of mounting steel cage armour, and improved armament consisting of either a Cadillac-Gage 1 metre turret, a Nanuk Remotely Controlled Weapon Station or a FFNW (Fitted For Not With) mounting, although some vehicles have been seen using older weapons mounts in place of not having any weapons mounted due to FFNW and not having enough RWS to equip all vehicles at once.

After being upgraded, the family of vehicles later became known by the acronym TLAV (Tracked Light Armoured Vehicle) or the LAV-T in Canadian Army parlance. While some vehicles were retired as early as a year after being upgraded, the remaining vehicles are now set to be replaced along with the Bison in the coming decade by the ACSV (A LAV 6 support vehicle variant) produced by General Dynamics Land Systems-Canada as announced by the Government of Canada on August 4, 2020.

Under the APCLE program, there were a number of variants created, these include:

- MTVL (Mobile Tactical Vehicle Light) – Standard APC variant fitted with a Cadillac-Gage 1 metre turret taken from a AVGP Grizzly, armed with a M2HB .50cal machine gun and a C6 GPMG. Also used as a light munitions carrier. The MTVL series could also be fitted with mission specific equipment such as wire cutters mounted above the headlights on the front of the vehicle or Wegmann 76 mm Multi-Purpose Grenade Launcher Tubes on the front of the turret (usually 8 launchers with 4 on each side of the turret in rows of 2) or the front of the hull. A total of 25 of the variant were produced.
- MTVC (Mobile Tactical Vehicle Heavy Resupply) – A replacement for the M548 logistical carriers, It is a flatbed variant of the MTVL with fold-down armoured sides and a tailgate. It provides improved carrying capacity and protection over the previous carrier along with a hydraulically operated crane mounted at the rear of the armoured cab, which is able to handle materials with a load capacity of 1,590 kg at a reach of up to 6.3 m. It can be fitted with a FFNW (Fitted For Not With) position allowing a RWS to be installed on the vehicle if redistribution is required for operational reasons. Production of the variant for Canadian Forces began in 2002 like the other variants with an order for 53 vehicles but seems to have been cancelled by 2006 with an unknown number produced.
- MTVE (Mobile Tactical Vehicle Engineer) – Military engineering version equipped with a large plough blade on the front, a hydraulically powered auger on the rear driver's side, and hydraulic hoses for use with hydraulic tools opposite the auger. Fitted with a Cadillac-Gage 1 metre turret taken from a AVGP Grizzly, armed with a M2HB .50cal machine gun and a C6 GPMG. A total of 28 of the variant were produced.
- MTVF (Mobile Tactical Vehicle Fitter) – Repair team vehicle, similar to the M113A3 MRT, used for repairing M113s in the field. Equipped with either a Nanuk Remotely Controlled Weapon Station (Remote Weapon Station) system or a FFNW (Fitted For Not With) position allowing a RWS to be installed on the vehicle if redistribution is required for operational reasons. When armed with the Nanuk Remotely Controlled Weapon Station it mounts a C6 GPMG with a 220-round ammunition box. Using either the day camera or thermal imaging camera, an LCD screen and joystick, the crew commander can engage targets from the protection of the vehicle without exposure. The vehicle is also fitted with a HIAB crane. A total of 36 of the variant were produced, 24 with RWS and 12 with FFNW.
- MTVR (Mobile Tactical Vehicle Recovery) – A armoured recovery vehicle equipped with a 20,000 kg Pacific Car and Foundry Company model P30 Planetary Winch and an integrated Star Machine and Tool Company bearing mounted model 300-S crane for recovering M113s or other vehicles of up to 11,340 kg in the field. Equipped with either a Nanuk Remotely Controlled Weapon Station (Remote Weapon Station) system or a FFNW (Fitted For Not With) position allowing a RWS to be installed on the vehicle if redistribution is required for operational reasons. When armed with the Nanuk Remotely Controlled Weapon Station it mounts a C6 GPMG with a 220-round ammunition box. Using either the day camera or thermal imaging camera, an LCD screen and joystick, the crew commander can engage targets from the protection of the vehicle without exposure. A total of 23 of the variant were produced, 18 with RWS and 5 with FFNW.
- MTVA (Mobile Tactical Vehicle Ambulance) – A conversion of existing MTVL variants that were considered surplus to operational requirements into armoured ambulances. Potentially equipped weapon systems depend on the exact variant they were converted from but would likely either be a Nanuk Remotely Controlled Weapon Station (Remote Weapon Station) system or a FFNW (Fitted For Not With) position allowing a RWS to be installed on the vehicle if redistribution is required for operational reasons. When armed with the Nanuk Remotely Controlled Weapon Station it mounts a C6 GPMG with a 220-round ammunition box. An unknown number of vehicles were converted into this variant.
- M577A3 Command Post – Otherwise known as the TLAV CP (Tracked Light Armoured Vehicle - Command Post) or LAV-T/CP, nicknamed the 'Queen Mary', it carries a communications suite in a heightened hull, the same as other M577 of the A3 standard. A total of 33 of the variant were produced.
- M113A3 MRT – Otherwise known as the TLAV MRT (Tracked Light Armoured Vehicle - Mobile Repair Team) or LAV-T/MRT, the vehicle is similar to previous MRT variants, used for repairing and assisting with recovery of M113s in the field. Equipped with either a Nanuk Remotely Controlled Weapon Station (Remote Weapon Station) system or a FFNW (Fitted For Not With) position allowing a RWS to be installed on the vehicle if redistribution is required for operational reasons. When armed with the Nanuk Remotely Controlled Weapon Station it mounts a C6 GPMG with a 220-round ammunition box. Using either the day camera or thermal imaging camera, an LCD screen and joystick, the crew commander can engage targets from the protection of the vehicle without exposure. The vehicle is fitted with a HIAB crane as well. A total of 17 of the variant were produced, 13 with RWS and 4 with FFNW.
- M113A3 Ambulance – Otherwise known as the TLAV Ambulance (Tracked Light Armoured Vehicle) or LAV-T Ambulance is a conversion of existing M113A3 variants that were considered surplus to operational requirements into armoured ambulances. Potentially equipped weapon systems depend on the exact variant they were converted from but would likely either be a Nanuk Remotely Controlled Weapon Station (Remote Weapon Station) system or a FFNW (Fitted For, Not With) position allowing a RWS to be installed on the vehicle if redistribution is required for operational reasons. When armed with the Nanuk Remotely Controlled Weapon Station it mounts a C6 GPMG with a 220-round ammunition box. An unknown number of vehicles were converted into this variant.
- M113A3 RWS – Otherwise known as the TLAV RWS (Tracked Light Armoured Vehicle) or LAV-T RWS is an APC version of the M113A3 standard, equipped with either a Nanuk Remotely Controlled Weapon Station (Remote Weapon Station) system or a FFNW (Fitted For Not With) position allowing a RWS to be installed on the vehicle if redistribution is required for operational reasons. When armed with the Nanuk Remotely Controlled Weapon Station it mounts a C6 GPMG with a 220-round ammunition box. Using either the day camera or thermal imaging camera, an LCD screen and joystick, the crew commander can engage targets from the protection of the vehicle without exposure. The M113A3 series could also be fitted with mission specific equipment such as wire cutters mounted above the headlights on the front of the vehicle or Wegmann 76 mm Multi-Purpose Grenade Launcher Tubes on the front of the hull. A total of 40 of the variant were produced, 23 with RWS and 17 with FFNW.
- M113A3 TUR – Otherwise known as the TLAV (Tracked Light Armoured Vehicle) or LAV-T is an APC version of the M113A3 standard equipped with a Cadillac-Gage 1 metre turret taken from a AVGP Grizzly, armed with a M2HB .50cal machine gun and a C6 GPMG. The M113A3 series could also be fitted with mission specific equipment such as wire cutters mounted above the headlights on the front of the vehicle or Wegmann 76 mm Multi-Purpose Grenade Launcher Tubes on the front of the turret (usually 8 launchers with 4 on each side of the turret in rows of 2) or the front of the hull. A total of 52 of the variant were produced.

Models removed from service:

Canada originally adopted and used the M113A1 series of vehicles after the failure of the domestic program for creating an armoured personnel carrier which had culminated in the Bobcat APC. After the cancellation of the Bobcat in late 1963, Canada began looking for an off-the-shelf vehicle to purchase instead and as the Canadian Army had kept themselves updated on American armour developments, including having even trialed some M59 APCs during the mid to late 1950s in parallel to the Bobcats development, they decided to purchase the M113A1 series as it fit the desired roles for use. In 1964 Canada began to procure the M113A1 from the United States with an order for 300 M113A1s, delivered through 1964–1965, with additional orders in 1968 for 300 M113A1s, and in 1971 for 445 M113A1s.

While the vehicles had all initially used the standard American T130 tracks that came with the vehicles, by 1974 a third of the fleet was using the T130E1 tracks as a large scale trial of the new track which was supposed to have a longer service life of around 60% along with better durability but results of these large scale trials were extremely poor, blamed on poor quality materials used as well as forging defects, these factors led to a search for new tracks to replace both the T130 and T130E1 tracks. The search culminated in the Diehl 213B tracks made in the Federal Republic of Germany which were already being used on the West German M113 fleet. Canadian trials with the Diehl 213B tracks proved conclusively that for a slightly higher cost initially over the T130E1, it had a much longer service life, better durability, easier maintenance, and would save money in the long term. In March 1976 the procurement of the Diehl 213B tracks was approved with delivery to forces in Europe taking place during mid-July, forces in Canada during September, and forces on the UN mission in Cyprus during October. Eventually the entire Canadian fleet was using the Diehl tracks, along with the Lynx and later the M113A2 series.

Beginning between 1980 and 1984, Canada began to procure the M113A2 in limited numbers and also slowly began to upgrade older M113A1s to the A2 standard. As of the early 1990s, Canada had a mixed fleet of A1 and A2 series, for which they began to also procure a large number of ACAV protection kits as early as 1992 for use in United Nations peacekeeping missions like UNPROFOR and later NATO intervention in the Balkans, with these kits even seeing limited use in the War in Afghanistan (2001–2021) on some M113A3s and MTVLs. The fleet started to be withdrawn from service in the late 1990s starting mainly with older M113A1s and by the mid-2000s, only vehicles upgraded or being upgraded to M113A3 or MTVL standards were still in service.

- M113A1 – Basic APC version of the A1 series fitted with either a M2HB .50cal machine gun or a C5 GPMG 7.62mm NATO machine gun, American M113 ACAV kits would be fitted onto some M113A1s. During peacekeeping in the Balkans during the 90s, American M113 ACAV kits would be fitted onto some M113A2s, featuring an armoured protection package around the gunner.
- M113A1 RCL – A modified APC version converted for use as a recoilless rifle carrier that featured both a M40 recoilless rifle mounted on the top of the vehicle and either a M2HB .50cal machine gun or a C5 GPMG 7.62mm NATO machine gun.
- M150A1 – ATGM carrier version of the A1 series fitted with a TOW or I-TOW launcher and either a M2HB .50cal machine gun or a C5 GPMG 7.62mm NATO machine gun.
- M113A1 SS11 – A modified APC variant converted for use as an ATGM carrier, mounting 2 SS11B1 launchers with 1 missile each on the roof overtop of the troop compartment. At least 10 of the variant were produced, being used in service in Europe from the late 60s to the late 70s when they were replaced fully with the M150 TOW carriers, after which they were converted back to the standard A1 series APC configuration.
- M577A1 – Command Post variant of the A1 series.
- M113A1 Ambulance – A basic APC version of the A1 series with a modified troop compartment for carrying casualties, armed with either a M2HB .50cal machine gun or a C5 GPMG 7.62mm NATO machine gun.
- M113A1 ARV(L) – A armoured recovery vehicle variant of the A1 series fitted with a 20,000 kg Pacific Car and Foundry Company model P30 Planetary Winch and an integrated Star Machine and Tool Company bearing mounted model 300-S crane for recovering M113s or other vehicles of up to 11,340 kg in the field. It was also fitted with ground spades to the rear of the hull on each side of the ramp to stabilize the vehicle during recovery operations. Armed with either a M2HB .50cal machine gun or a C5 GPMG 7.62mm NATO machine gun. Armed with either a M2HB .50cal machine gun or a C5 GPMG 7.62mm NATO machine gun.
- M113A1 EVSEV (Engineering Variant Specially Equipped Vehicle) - Variant of the A1 series for engineer units. Fitted with a front-mounted dozer blade made by Flextrac Nodwell Limited, hydraulic ground auger and hydraulic power tools. The hydraulic pump and fluid reservoirs were mounted inside the hull necessitating the development of the initial modification for external fuel tanks mounted on each side of the rear ramp, not to be confused with the external fuel tanks seen on the A2 series, these were mounted lower than the later version. They were armed with either a M2HB .50cal machine gun or a C5 GPMG 7.62mm NATO machine gun.
- M125A1 – 81 mm mortar carrier variant of the A1 series, fitted with a Canadian C3 81 mm mortar and either a M2HB .50cal machine gun or a C5 GPMG 7.62mm NATO machine gun.
- M113A1 MRT – Mobile Repair Team variant of the M113 in the A1 series standard, equivalent to the M579 Fitter's Vehicle, used for repairing and assisting in the recovery of M113s in the field. Fitted with a modified HIAB Model 172R crane mounted on the top left side of the hull above the passenger area, behind the driver station, with a max weight of 1,360 kg at a max reach of 3.3 m. Armed with either a M2HB .50cal machine gun or a C5 GPMG 7.62mm NATO machine gun.
- M113A2 – Basic APC version of the A2 series, featuring external fuel tanks, fitted with either a M2HB .50cal machine gun or a C5 GPMG 7.62mm NATO machine gun. During peacekeeping in the Balkans during the 90s, American M113 ACAV kits would be fitted onto some M113A2s, featuring an armoured protection package around the gunner.
- M150A2 – ATGM carrier version of the A2 series, featuring external fuel tanks, fitted with a TOW or I-TOW launcher and either a M2HB .50cal machine gun or a C5 GPMG 7.62mm NATO machine gun.
- M577A2 – Command Post variant of the A2 series, featuring external fuel tanks.
- M113A2 Ambulance – A basic APC version of the A2 series with a modified troop compartment for carrying casualties, armed with either a M2HB .50cal machine gun or a C5 GPMG 7.62mm NATO machine gun.
- M113A2 ARV(L) – A armoured recovery vehicle variant of the A2 series fitted with a 20,000 kg Pacific Car and Foundry Company model P30 Planetary Winch and an integrated Star Machine and Tool Company bearing mounted model 300-S crane for recovering M113s or other vehicles of up to 11,340 kg in the field. It was also fitted with ground spades to the rear of the hull on each side of the ramp to stabilize the vehicle during recovery operations. Armed with either a M2HB .50cal machine gun or a C5 GPMG 7.62mm NATO machine gun. Armed with either a M2HB .50cal machine gun or a C5 GPMG 7.62mm NATO machine gun.
- M113A2 TUA (TOW Under Armour) – Canadian version of the NM142 anti-tank vehicle, utilizing the same Norwegian turret designed by Kværner Eureka but built under Licensed production in Canada on a M113A2 chassis. Some of the additional changes include being fitted with external fuel tanks like other vehicles of the A2 series along with mountings on the rear of the turret for two banks of six Wegmann 76 mm Multi-Purpose Grenade Launcher Tubes. To accommodate the addition of the turret, the Commander's cupola and station were repositioned directly behind the engine wall. Later in service during UNPROFOR the vehicles were mounted with an external coaxial C6 GPMG fitted to the side of the right TOW-2 launcher on the turret, allowing it to be aligned with the main sight for use by the gunner and a connection was added to allow the gunner to fire it remotely. The C6 GPMG also had to be modified to feed from the right side of the weapon due to the side mounting on the launcher. A total of 72 vehicles were modified to this variant, being first fielded in 1989.
- M113A2 EVSEV (Engineering Variant Specially Equipped Vehicle) - Variant of the M113A2 for engineer units. Fitted with a front-mounted dozer blade, hydraulic ground auger and hydraulic power tools. The hydraulic pump and fluid reservoirs were mounted inside the hull necessitating the development of the initial modification for external fuel tanks mounted on each side of the rear ramp using the A2 style of exterior fuel tanks. They were armed with either a M2HB .50cal machine gun or a C5 GPMG 7.62mm NATO machine gun.
- M113A2 DAREOD (Damaged Airfield Reconnaissance Explosive Ordnance Disposal) – EOD variant of the M113A2 Mk 1 with 265 hp Detroit Diesel engine. This variant is equipped with a 1-man turret, external fuel tanks, additional search lights and Pearson mine-clearing equipment.
- M113A3 (Modified US Standard) – Basic APC version of the A3 series, featuring external fuel tanks, not to be confused with the Canadian series standard of M113A3s. These along with potentially other A3 series variants were part of a proposed 200 vehicle acquisition overseen by Colonel Romeo Dallaire which saw trials of the vehicle conducted in both the United States and Canada after the release of the 1987 Defence White Paper by then Minister of National Defence Perrin Beatty. The vehicles were meant to equip the Canadian Forces Reserves but after political lobbying and intervention by Diesel Division General Motors Canada (DDGM) and Canadian Government members like Michael Wilson, who was the Minister of Finance at the time, the Land Forces Command of the Canadian Forces instead opted to procure the Bison light armoured vehicle instead.
- M113A2 25mm – A prototype built on a basic APC variant of the A2 series that was heavily modified as a fire support vehicle, mounted with the addition of a LAV-25 turret in the center of the vehicle. It was trialed with two main armaments during testing; a 25mm M242 chain gun and a 25mm Oerlikon-Contraves autocannon along with a coaxial C6 GPMG 7.62mm NATO machine gun. Only a single prototype was created and tested during 1985 in Europe with the vehicle later being converted back to a regular APC version.
- M113A2 ADATS (Air Defence Anti-Tank System) is an air-defence vehicle variant, developed collaboratively between Lockheed Martin and Oerlikon Contraves, first fielded by the Canadian Forces in 1988 with 36 vehicles produced. The system features a turret with an eight tube ADATS missile launcher based on a modified M113A2 chassis. On top of the turret is an X-band radar with a range of 25 km. Used solely by the Canadian Forces, the 34 remaining ADATS have been withdrawn from Canadian service as of April 2012, with no planned replacement announced for it since late 2012. The missile was evaluated by the US Army (LOS-F-H program), but not selected for adoption.
- M548A1 – The logistical carrier variant of the M113 series, of the A1 series, these were later upgraded to the A2 series. Armed with either a M2HB .50cal machine gun or a C5 GPMG 7.62mm NATO machine gun.
- M548A2 – The logistical carrier variant of the M113 series, these were originally of the A1 series but had been upgraded to the A2 series at the same time as other M113A1s. Armed with either a M2HB .50cal machine gun or a C5 GPMG 7.62mm NATO machine gun.
- M113A2 MRT – Mobile Repair Team variant of the M113 in the A2 series standard, equivalent to the M579 Fitter's Vehicle, featuring external fuel tanks, used for repairing and assisting in the recovery of M113s in the field. Fitted with a modified HIAB Model 172R crane mounted on the top left side of the hull above the passenger area, behind the driver station, with a max weight of 1,360 kg at a max reach of 3.3 m. Armed with either a M2HB .50cal machine gun or a C5 GPMG 7.62mm NATO machine gun.
- M113A1 CMS (Counter-mortar Radar) – A counter-mortar radar variant on a converted M113A1 APC chassis, mounted with a AN/MPQ-501 counter-mortar radar system produced by Raytheon Canada Limited. It could accurately locate the source of high-angle artillery, such as mortars, rockets, ballistic rockets, and other artillery. It could also conduct battlefield surveillance, survey positions, and operate day or night. It was air transportable by C-130 as demonstrated by the RCAF when it had been flown from CFB Toronto to Europe. The vehicles were later sought to have been converted back to APCs by the late 1980s.
- M113A2 ROFCS – Unknown variant that requires further research.
- Lynx (Lynx reconnaissance vehicle) – A C&R (C&V in Dutch service) M113 built to Canadian specs, differs in configuration to the Dutch production variant. Armed with both a M2HB .50cal machine gun and a rear facing C5 GPMG 7.62mm NATO machine gun.
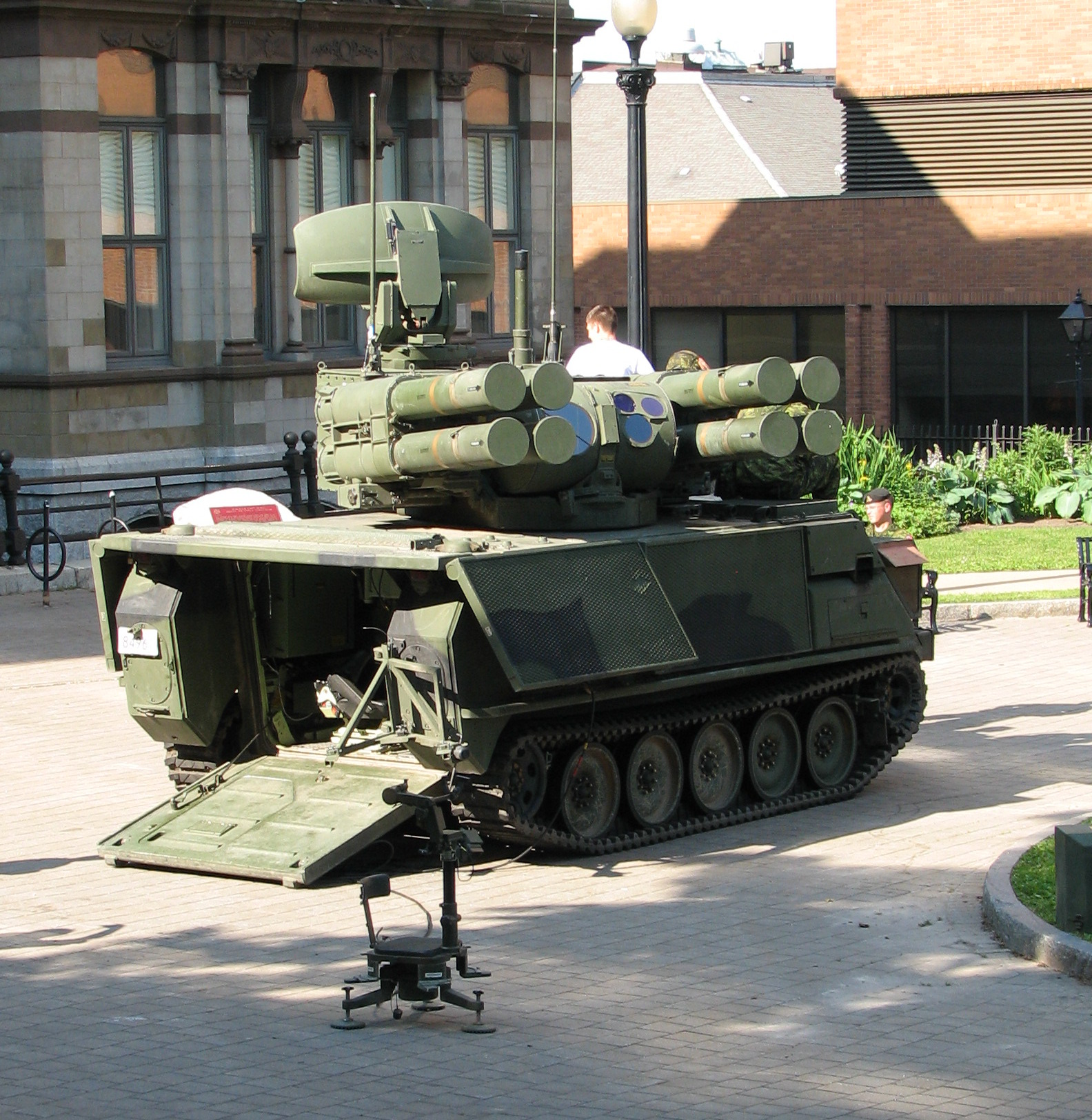
M113A2 ADATS on display, July 2008.

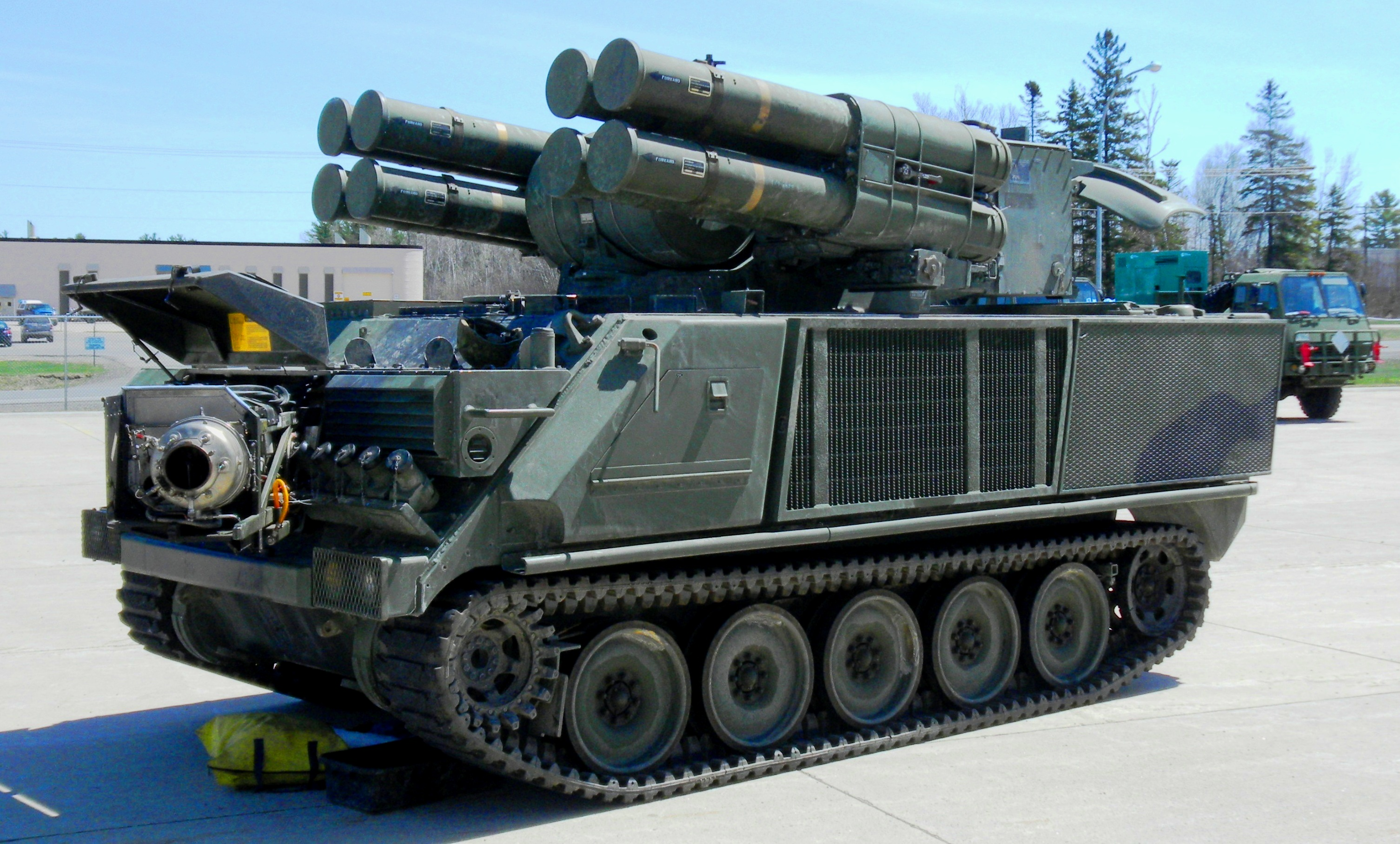
M113A2 ADATS at CFB Gagetown, May 2011.

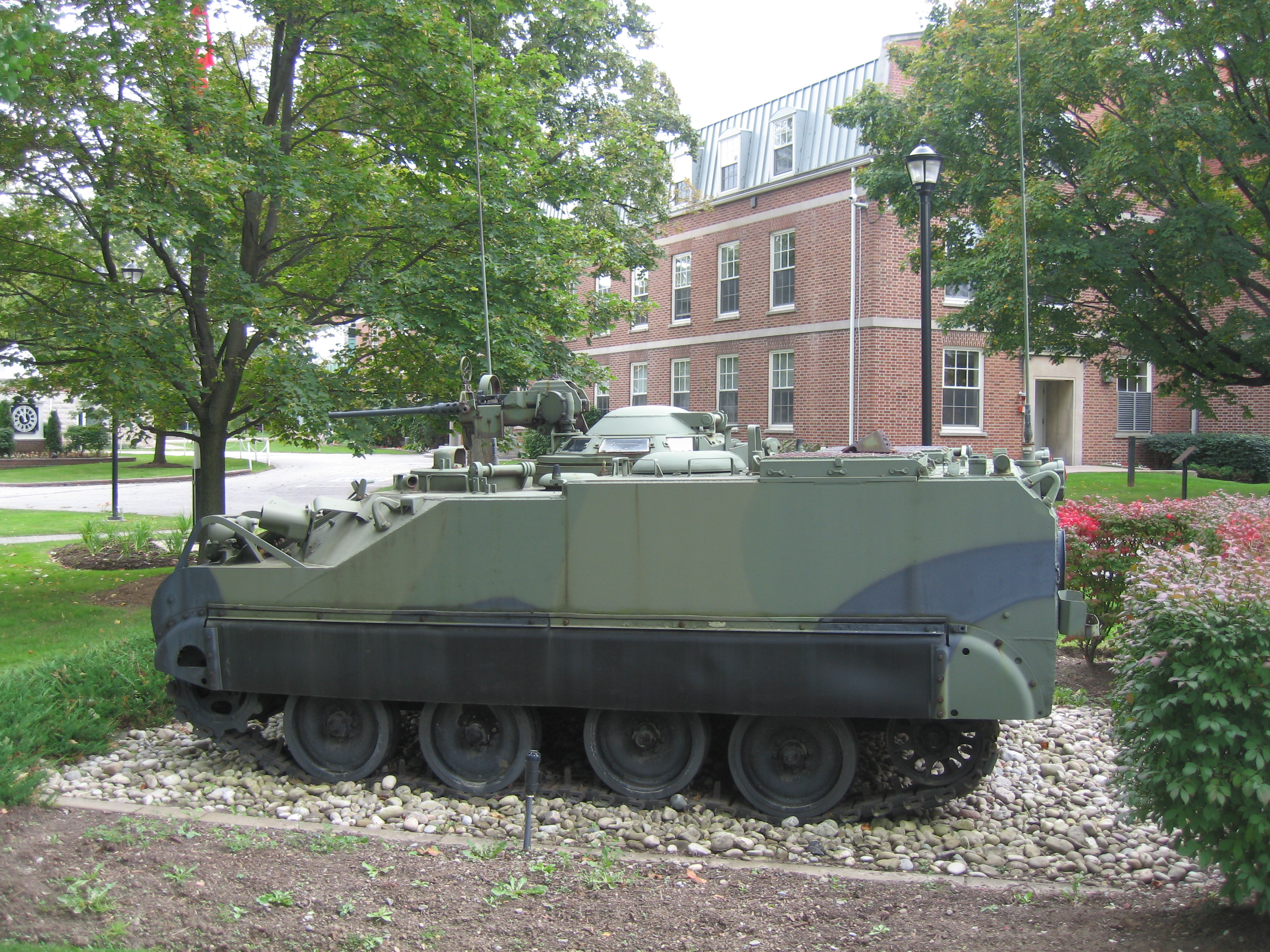
Lynx Reconnaissance Vehicle at the Canadian Forces College, October 2008.

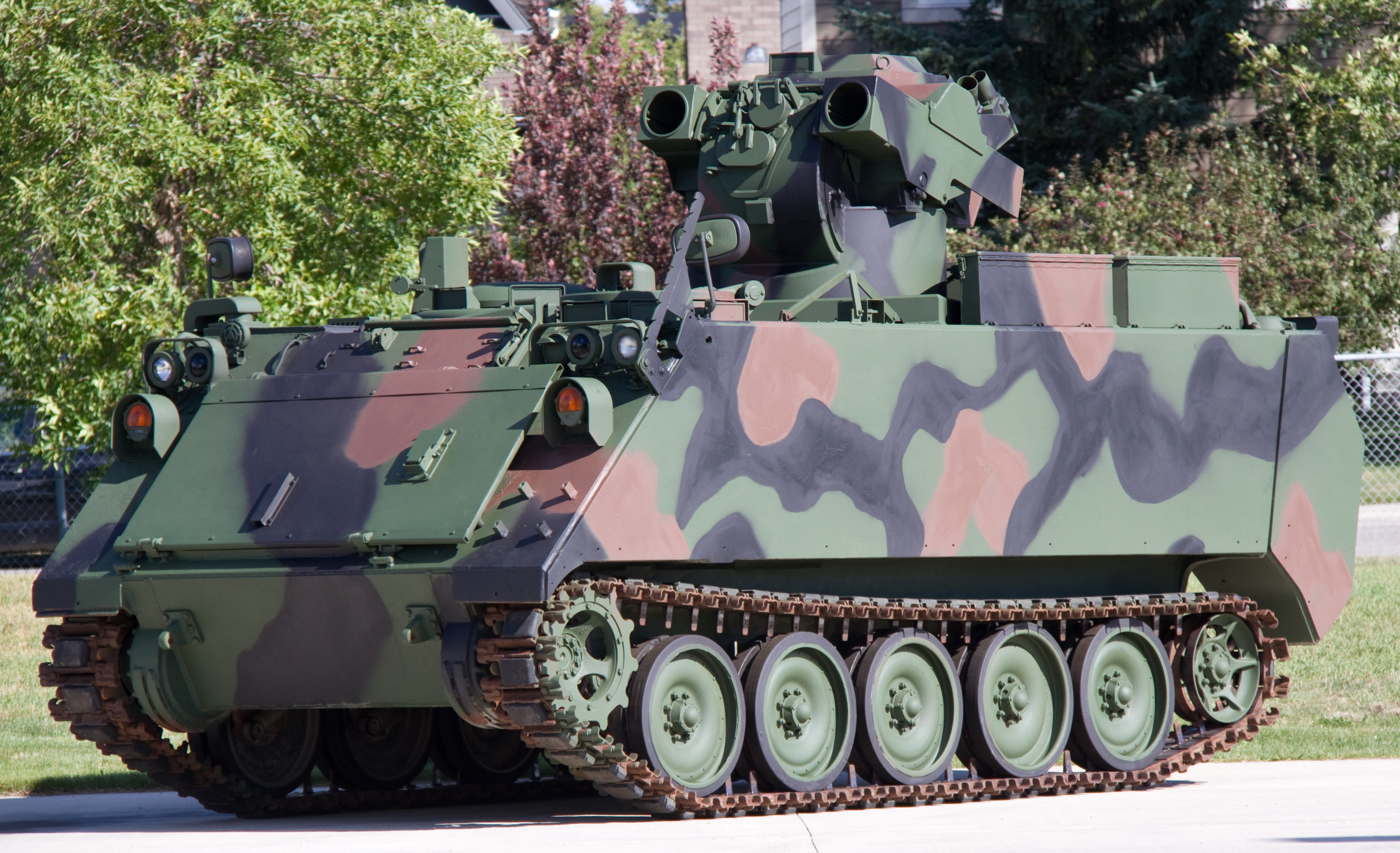
M113A2 TUA, September 2012.

=== Chile ===
Chile first received M113s in 1970, with a batch of 60 FMC Corp. produced M113A1, with these vehicles having continued in service into the 2010s. In 1990 when Chile became democratic it initiated the Alcázar project to reorganize, restructure, and modernize components of the Land Force. As part of the project an emphasis was placed on the mechanization of infantry and engineer units, which culminated in 1996 with the acquisition of 128 surplus M113A2 and additional M548A1 and M106A1 vehicles from Italy, an undisclosed number of surplus M113A1-B from Belgium along with 8 surplus Dutch M113 C&V. In addition, a batch of 14 M113A2 Plus series engineering vehicles were acquired in 2002 from the company Ingenieros.

In 2003 Chile acquired additional M113s from the United States with a batch of 158 surplus M113A2, which also included additional variants like the M106A2, M577A2, M163A2 and the M548A1 alongside baseline APCs. A batch of 48 surplus M548A1 were also purchased from Canada. Following these acquisitions the M113 fleet underwent an upgrade program under the Huracán II project which saw the vehicles fitted with two banks of four Wegmann 76 mm Multi-Purpose Grenade Launcher Tubes on the front of the hull, storage baskets mounted on the side of the hull along the length of the troop bay, and the upgrading of 60 vehicles to the M113A2 ABL KUKA standard. Additionally 22 surplus M113A2GE were acquired from Germany and converted by FAMAE (Fábricas y Maestranzas del Ejército) into Armoured Ambulances. FAMAE has also carried out other M113 based conversions since such as converting 8 M548A1 vehicles into fuel tankers or converting Chilean Air Force M163A2 PIVADS into basic M113A2 APCs.

Models in service:

- M113A2 Plus - Engineer variant armed with a M2HB .50 Cal machine gun. Fitted with external fuel tanks, two banks of four Wegmann 76 mm Multi-Purpose Grenade Launcher Tubes on the front of the hull, and either a dozer blade or minesweeper attachment on the front of the hull. If the dozer blade is fitted the 76 mm Multi-Purpose Grenade Launcher Tubes have to be repositioned from the outer edges of the front of the hull to the center of the front of the hull.
- M113A2 Plus SCC - Section Command Car variant, armed with a M2HB .50 Cal machine gun. Fitted with a recovery crane, external fuel tanks, two banks of four Wegmann 76 mm Multi-Purpose Grenade Launcher Tubes on the front of the hull, a set of storage baskets mounted on the left side of the hull and six polymer tubes carried on the right side of the hull for crossing anti-tank ditches.
- M113A2 ABL KUKA - Anti-armour variant fitted with a KUKA GBD-AOA turret, armed with an Oerlikon KBA-B02 25 mm cannon. Also fitted with two banks of four Wegmann 76 mm Multi-Purpose Grenade Launcher Tubes on the front of the hull and storage baskets mounted on the side of the hull along the length of the troop bay. Only some vehicles are fitted with external fuel tanks.
- M548A1 (M548 Series) - The logistical carrier variant of the M113A2 series. Armed with a M2HB .50 Cal machine gun.
- M548A1 Mod. - Converted M548A1 for use as a specialized Cisterna de Combustible (fuel tanker). Armed with a M2HB .50 Cal machine gun. The conversion was carried out locally by FAMAE, with a total of 8 vehicles being converted to this configuration.
- M106A1 (M106 Series) - 120 mm mortar carrier variant of the A1 series, fitted with a 120 mm mortar produced locally by FAMAE and a M2HB .50cal machine gun. The 120 mm mortar replaced the M30 106 mm mortar previously used on the vehicles before being purchased by Chile.
- M106A2 (M106 Series) - 120 mm mortar carrier variant of the A2 series, fitted with a 120 mm mortar produced locally by FAMAE and a M2HB .50cal machine gun. The 120 mm mortar replaced the M30 106 mm mortar previously used on the vehicles before being purchased by Chile.
- M113A1 - Base APC variant of the M113A1 series, armed with a M2HB .50 Cal machine gun.
- M113A2 - Base APC variant of the M113A2 series, armed with a M2HB .50 Cal machine gun. Some of these vehicles were upgraded under the Huracán II project and were fitted with two banks of four Wegmann 76 mm Multi-Purpose Grenade Launcher Tubes on the front of the hull and storage baskets mounted on the side of the hull along the length of the troop bay. Only some vehicles have external fuel tanks.
- M113A2 LG - Base APC variant of the M113A2 series, armed with a Mk19 Mod 3 Automatic Grenade Launcher. Only a small number of M113A2 were fitted with the Mk19. Some of these vehicles were upgraded under the Huracán II project and were fitted with two banks of four Wegmann 76 mm Multi-Purpose Grenade Launcher Tubes on the front of the hull and storage baskets mounted on the side of the hull along the length of the troop bay.
- M113A2 AMB - Armoured Ambulance variant of the M113A2 series, these vehicles are unarmed but are fitted with storage baskets mounted on the side of the hull along the length of the troop bay.
- M163A2 PIVADS (M163 Series) - Air Defence variant of the M113 series used by both the Air Force and the Army. The Air Force vehicles were later converted by FAMAE into basic M113A2 APCs.
- M577A2 (M577 Series) - Command Post variant of the A2 series, only some vehicles are fitted with external fuel tanks.
- M113A1 RR M40A1 - A modified version of the base APC variant of the M113A1 series which converted it for use as a recoilless rifle carrier that featured both a M40A1 recoilless rifle mounted on the top of the vehicle and a M2HB .50 Cal machine gun. In the early 2000s the M40A1 was overhauled and modernized with a thermal sight, infrared system, and a laser rangefinder for all weather operations and to better maximize effective range of the weapon.

Models out of service:

- M113A1 RR M20 - A modified version of the base APC variant of the M113A1 series which converted it for use as a recoilless rifle carrier that featured both a M20 recoilless rifle mounted on the top of the vehicle and a M2HB .50 Cal machine gun.
- M113 C&V (M113 C&V Series) - Fitted with the GBD-AOA turret, armed with an Oerlikon KBA-B 25 mm cannon.

=== Denmark ===
Denmark had a variety of M113s enter service starting with a delivery of 450 M113 (including 56 M125 81 mm mortar carriers) between 1962 and 1964, followed by delivery of 288 M113A1 from 1967 to 1975 and 1978–1979. These were to replace the M3 Halftrack and C15TA Armoured Truck that Denmark had used since 1955 and World War II respectively. During 1972-1973 the original M113s underwent a 'mid-life-update' and were brought up to the M113A1 standard by Falck Schmidt in Odense. The M113 series has since been replaced by the MOWAG Piranha V and the BAE Systems Hägglunds AB CV 90 in service, with only a few M113A2 Mk I DK fire fighting vehicles kept.

Models in service:

- M113A2 Mk I DK fire fighting vehicle - Rebuilt M113A2 Mk I DK for fire fighting use, to replace the older M113A1 variant. In the mid-2000s it was announced the M113A2 Mk I DK was being withdrawn from service but that a few vehicles would be rebuilt as fire fighting vehicles to replace the older M113A1 fire fighting vehicle and be kept in service.

Models out of service:

- M113 - Base APC variant of the original M113 series, armed with a M2HB .50 Cal or a M/62 LMG.
- M125 - An 81 mm mortar carrier variant of the original M113 series, armed with a M2HB .50 Cal or a M/62 LMG and an 81mm mortar.
- M106 - A 107 mm mortar carrier variant of the original M113 series, armed with a M2HB .50 Cal or a M/62 LMG and an 81 mm mortar instead of a 107 mm mortar.
- M113 Green Archer (Counter Battery Radar) - A modified variant of the original M113 series, 6 vehicles were mounted with a British radar system from EMI for counter battery use with a range of up to 30 km for detection. It could also be used for limited surface surveillance. The vehicles had a modified exhaust to prevent interference with the radar system and the radar system folded down for when the vehicle was moving.
- M113 CP (Command Post) - Command Post using a modified APC variant of the original M113 series instead of the M577, armed with a M2HB .50 Cal or a M/62 LMG. It has a modified interior with a map table and mounts a Honda 1 kW DC generator set on the right side of the roof of the vehicle.
- M113 Ambulance - A modified variant of the original M113 series, used as a field ambulance.
- M113A1 - Base APC variant of the M113A1 series, armed with a M2HB .50 Cal or a M/62 LMG.
- M113A1 with Addon-Armour - A modified APC variant of the M113A1 series, fitted with American ACAV turret armour/protection and Addon Armour on the front and side of the vehicle from Israelian Urdan. Armed with a M2HB .50 Cal or a M/62 LMG, these were modified for use during IFOR and SFOR.
- M113A1 CP (Command Post) - Command Post using a modified APC variant of the M113A1 series instead of the M577, armed with a M2HB .50 Cal or a M/62 LMG. It has a modified interior with a map table and mounts a Honda 1 kW DC generator set on the right side of the roof of the vehicle.
- M113A1 TOW - A modified variant of the M113A1 series similar to the M150, used as an ATGM carrier, armed with a M2HB .50 Cal or a M/62 LMG and a I-TOW launcher, carries 10 I-TOW missiles internally. In 1987 these were upgraded to the TOW-2 standard.
- M125A1 - A mortar carrier variant of the M113A1 series, armed with a M2HB .50 Cal or a M/62 LMG and an 81mm mortar.
- M113A1 Dozer - A modified variant of the M113A1 series, armed with a M2HB .50 Cal or a M/62 LMG and equipped with a dozer-blade.
- M113A1 ZB 298 - A modified variant of the M113A1 series, equipped with a M/74 type ZB 298 radar from Marconi, capable of detecting vehicles up to 10 km away and personnel up to 5 km away. The radar was removed from the vehicles in the mid-1980s and the vehicles were converted back to APC use.
- M113A1 CEV (Combat Engineering Vehicle) - A modified variant of the M113A1 series, armed with a M2HB .50 Cal or a M/62 LMG and equipped with a ladder on the left side of the vehicle.
- M113A1 FV (Fitter's Vehicle) - A modified variant of the M113A1 series, armed with a M2HB .50 Cal or a M/62 LMG and equipped with a Swedish HIAB-crane with a max capacity of 3 tons.
- M113A1 Ambulance - A modified variant of the M113A1 series, used as a field ambulance.
- M113A1 FFV (Fire Fighting Vehicle) - A modified variant of the M113A1 series used as a fire fighting vehicle, equipped with a 1,500 Liter water tank and a hydraulic pump along with a heater.
- M113A1 FO (Forward Observer) - A modified variant of the M113A1 series, armed with a M2HB .50 Cal or a M/62 LMG. It has a modified interior to seat a crew of 4 and fit additional radios, it is also equipped with a laser range finder and a thermal sight on a pintle mount beside the rear top hatch over the former troop compartment.
- M113A2 Mk I DK - A modified M113A1 that was rebuilt as a fire support vehicle of the M113A2 standard from 1989 to 1993 by Falck Schmidt in Odense at a cost worth 357 mil. DKr (1987), with 50 vehicles entering service in 1992. Originally planned to be called the "Wildcat" during the earlier stages of the project, it was never officially adopted due to copyright problems but remained a nickname for the vehicle. It is armed with a 25 mm Oerlikon-Contraves machine-cannon ranging up to 1,500 m and a M/62 LMG mounted co-axially. The 25 mm Oerlikon-gun has a firing-rate of approximately 600 rounds a minute. The main cannon and the coaxial are mounted in an Italian Oto Melara turret and have a thermal sight produced by Zeiss. The vehicles was upgraded with a more powerful turbo-charged engine (Detroit Diesel, 6V53T developing 265 hp at 2,800 rpm), improved suspension, external fuel tanks on rear, and an improved cooling and heating system. The original version does not mount any additional armour but during IFOR and SFOR 6 vehicles were fitted with Addon Armour from Israelian Urdan. The vehicles also mounted FMC armoured plates, a spall liner and belly armour, the fuel tanks were filled with safety foam balls, and the turret was fitted with a Danish kit consisting of ceramic and armoured plates developed by E. Falck Schmidt and Roulund in Odense, allowing the vehicle to resist fire from weapons up to 14.5 mm at a range down to 100 m. With the Defence Agreement 2005–2009 made in 2004, it was ultimately decided that the M113A2 Mk I DK would no longer be a part of the Danish Army's inventory, with only a few staying in service after having been rebuilt as fire fighting vehicles to replace the older M113A1 FFV fire fighting vehicles.

The M113G3 series upgrade by FFG which was initially done for 97 M113A1s and in 1999 it was announced that 257 M113A1s were to be upgraded between 2001 and 2004, which included; a more powerful 6-cylinder, 10.6 Liter turbo-charged diesel-engine (MTU 6V 183 TC22 EURO II) developing 300 hp with a ZF LSG 1000 transmission (6F2R), improved suspension, prepared slots for mounting Addon Armour from Israelian Urdan, external fuel-tanks, a basket mount on the front of the hull, the option to mount 6 × smoke dischargers on the front of the hull, the original T130 tracks were replaced with Diehl 513 tracks, a new heater (Stewart-Warner, type 10560 M), a new 200 AMP generator, and an improved steering and brake system.

- M113G3 DK - Base APC variant that was upgraded to a sudo-M113A3 standard, armed with a M2HB .50 Cal or a M/62 LMG along with some vehicles having ACAV protection kits for the gunner. It can also mount 6 × smoke dischargers on the front of the hull, above a storage basket that was added on the lower half during the upgrade.
- M113G3 DK with Addon-Armour - Base APC variant that was upgraded to a sudo-M113A3 standard, armed with a M2HB .50 Cal or a M/62 LMG along with having ACAV protection kits for the gunner and Addon Armour on the front and sides of the vehicle as seen on the M113A1 with Addon-Armour. It can also mount 6 × smoke dischargers on the front of the hull, above a storage basket that was added on the lower half during the upgrade.
- M113G3 DK PCV (Platoon Command Vehicle) - A modified APC variant of the M113G3 DK standard, armed with 2 × M2HB .50 Cal, one in the turret with an ACAV protection kit and the other on a pintle mount at the rear of the vehicle on the roof, can be used by a soldier when the troop compartment roof hatch is open. Also can have Addon Armour on the front and sides of the vehicle as seen on the M113A1 with Addon-Armour. It can also mount 6 × smoke dischargers on the front of the hull, above the basket that was added on the M113G3 DK.
- M113G3 DK TOW - Upgraded M113A1 TOW ATGM carrier, armed with a M2HB .50 Cal or a M/62 LMG and a TOW-2 launcher, carries 10 TOW-2 missiles internally. It can also mount 6 × smoke dischargers on the front of the hull, above the basket that was added on the M113G3 DK.
- M113G3 DK CP (Command Post) - Command Post using a modified APC variant of the M113G3 DK series instead of the M577, armed with a M2HB .50 Cal or a M/62 LMG. It has a modified interior with a map table and mounts a Honda 1 kW DC generator set on the right side of the roof of the vehicle. It can also mount 6 × smoke dischargers on the front of the hull, above the basket that was added on the M113G3 DK.
- M113G3 DK Ambulance - A modified version of the M113G3 DK for use as a field ambulance, can be armed with a M2HB .50 Cal or a M/62 LMG. Some also had Addon Armour as seen on other variants mounted as well, along with ACAV protection kits. It can also mount 6 × smoke dischargers on the front of the hull, above the basket that was added on the M113G3 DK.
- M113G3 DK FV (Fitter's Vehicle) - A upgraded variant of the M113A1 FV to the M113G3 DK standard, armed with a M2HB .50 Cal or a M/62 LMG. The previous equipped Swedish HIAB-crane with a max capacity of 3 tons has been replaced with a Danish HMF K1 with a capacity of 2 tons.
- M113G3 DK EXT (Extended) - A modified APC variant of the M113G3 DK, armed with a M2HB .50 Cal or a M/62 LMG. Similar to the Canadian Forces MTVL series of upgrades. About 70 vehicles had their chassis extended 666 mm in length with the addition of an extra road wheel which increased the internal volume by 25% (2 m^{3}). It can also mount 6 × smoke dischargers on the front of the hull, above the basket that was added on the M113G3 DK.
- M113G3 DK EXT Ambulance (Extended Ambulance) - A modified ambulance variant of the M113G3 DK for use as a field ambulance, can be armed with a M2HB .50 Cal or a M/62 LMG. These vehicles also had a raised hull on the rear half of the vehicles, to enlarge the compartment. It can also mount 6 × smoke dischargers on the front of the hull, above the basket that was added on the M113G3 DK.
- M113G3 DK EXT CEV (Extended Combat Engineering Vehicle) - A modified engineering variant of the M113G3 DK, armed with a M2HB .50 Cal or a M/62 LMG. It can also mount 6 × smoke dischargers on the front of the hull, above the basket that was added on the M113G3 DK.
- M113G3 DK EXT MR (Extended Mine Roller) - A modified mine roller variant of the M113G3 DK, mounting a mine roller from Pearson Engineering Ltd used to detonate and neutralize land mines or other explosive devices. It could be armed with a M2HB .50 Cal or a M/62 LMG if required. Also can have Addon Armour on the front and sides of the vehicle as seen on the M113A1 with Addon-Armour. It can also mount 6 × smoke dischargers on the front of the hull, above the basket that was added on the M113G3 DK.
- M113G3 DK ETS (Elevated TOW System) - A trial ATGM carrier produced through a joint venture between Falck Schmidt A/S in Odense, Raytheon, Indra Sistemas and Delco Defense Systems Operations of General Motors for the Danish Army that was never accepted into service, it has a 4-tube TOW-2 launcher, and an elevated mast that can extended up to 6.5 meters above the ground, allowing TOW-2 missiles to be launched from any position. This allows the system to operate behind cover, maximizing the use of the terrain and other structures on the battlefield. While the vehicle is moving, ETS can be operated to locate targets, tracks targets and observe the battlefield. Once the vehicle has come to a complete stop, the TOW missiles can be immediately fired. It has 4 missiles ready to fire and 16 are stowed in the interior of the vehicle, meant for either the TOW-2A or TOW-2B series of missiles, with a reload time when under amour of 60 seconds. The vehicle can have six hours of continuous operation independent of the engine. The mast can be elevated into firing position and ready for action in 10 seconds. It also uses a stabilized gun/sight system with laser range finder and 2nd generation Gunner's thermal sight with narrow and wide fields of view, independent 360 degree low light television, a datalink for battlefield data and targets, video recordings, integrated Command & Control system, GPS/magnetic compass navigation etc. The vehicle is also C-130 transportable and configurable on other vehicle chassis like the Piranha V. While the program was received favorably, it was never adopted and as of 2017 Falck Schmidt A/S filled for bankruptcy.

Models that left service in 2014 and then returned to service in 2016 after undergoing essential modifications:

The M113G4 series upgrade by FFG was for remaining M113G3 in service to be upgraded, initially between 2009 and 2010, with the addition of upgraded belly protection, Rubber Band tracks to replace the Diehl 513 tracks, adjustable seats, and other features. The upgrade was originally just for vehicles in use during operations in the War in Afghanistan (2001-2021) but was later standardized for the G3 fleet through upgrades through 2011–2012.

- M113G4 DK - Base APC variant of the M113G4 standard, armed with a M2HB .50 Cal or a M/62 LMG. It can also mount 6 × smoke dischargers on the front of the hull just like the M113G3 DK series.
- M113G4 DK with Addon-Armour - Base APC variant of the M113G4 standard, armed with a M2HB .50 Cal or a M/62 LMG along with having ACAV protection kits for the gunner and Addon Armour on the front and sides of the vehicle as seen on the M113G3 DK with Addon-Armour. It can also mount 6 × smoke dischargers on the front of the hull, above a storage basket that was added on the lower half during the upgrade.
- M113G4 DK PCV (Platoon Command Vehicle) - A modified APC variant of the M113G4 DK standard, armed with 2 × M2HB .50 Cal, one in the turret with an ACAV protection kit and the other on a pintle mount at the rear of the vehicle on the roof, can be used by a soldier when the troop compartment roof hatch is open. It can also mount 6 × smoke dischargers on the front of the hull, above the basket that was added on the M113G3 DK.
- M113G4 DK TOW - Upgraded M113G3 DK TOW ATGM carrier, armed with a M2HB .50 Cal or a M/62 LMG and a TOW-2 launcher, carries 10 TOW-2 missiles internally. It can also mount 6 × smoke dischargers on the front of the hull.
- M113G4 DK CP (Command Post) - Command Post using a modified APC variant of the M113G4 DK series instead of the M577, armed with a M2HB .50 Cal or a M/62 LMG. It has a modified interior with a map table and mounts a Honda 1 kW DC generator set on the right side of the roof of the vehicle. It can also mount 6 × smoke dischargers on the front of the hull, above the basket that was added on the M113G3 DK.
- M113G4 DK Ambulance - A upgraded version of the M113G3 DK Ambulance to the M113G4 DK standard for use as a field ambulance, can be armed with a M2HB .50 Cal or a M/62 LMG. It can also mount 6 × smoke dischargers on the front of the hull, above the basket that was added on the M113G3 DK.
- M113G4 DK FV (Fitter's Vehicle) - A upgraded variant of the M113G3 FV to the M113G4 DK standard, armed with a M2HB .50 Cal or a M/62 LMG and equipped with a Swedish HIAB-crane with a max capacity of 3 tons.
- M113G4 DK EXT (Extended) - A upgraded APC variant of the M113G3 DK EXT to the M113G4 DK standard, armed with a M2HB .50 Cal or a M/62 LMG. Similar to the Canadian Forces MTVL series of upgrades. About 70 vehicles had their chassis extended 666 mm in length with the addition of an extra road wheel which increased the internal volume by 25% (2 m^{3}). It can also mount 6 × smoke dischargers on the front of the hull, above the basket that was added on the M113G3 DK.
- M113G4 DK EXT Ambulance (Extended Ambulance) - A upgraded ambulance variant of the M113G3 DK EXT Ambulance to the M113G4 DK EXT standard for use as a field ambulance, can be armed with a M2HB .50 Cal or a M/62 LMG. These vehicles also had a raised hull on the rear half of the vehicles, to enlarge the compartment. It can also mount 6 × smoke dischargers on the front of the hull, above the basket that was added on the M113G3 DK.
- M113G4 DK EXT CEV (Extended Combat Engineering Vehicle) - A upgraded engineering variant of the M113G3 DK EXT CEV to the M113G4 DK EXT standard, armed with a M2HB .50 Cal or a M/62 LMG. It can also mount 6 × smoke dischargers on the front of the hull, above the basket that was added on the M113G3 DK.
- M113G4 DK EXT MR (Extended Mine Roller) - A modified mine roller variant of the M113G3 DK EXT to the M113G4 DK EXT standard, mounting a mine roller from Pearson Engineering Ltd used to detonate and neutralize mines or other explosives. It could be armed with a M2HB .50 Cal or a M/62 LMG if required. It can also mount 6 × smoke dischargers on the front of the hull, above the basket that was added on the M113G3 DK.
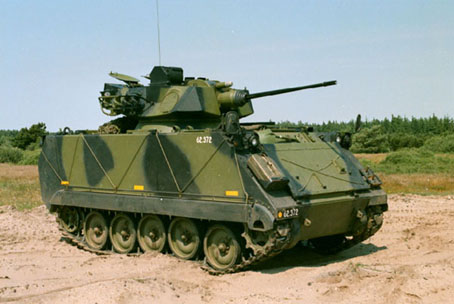
M113A2 MK I DK without Addon Armour, 2004.

=== Germany ===
In German service, the M113 and M113A1 were known respectively as the M113G and M113A1G, while the M577 and M577A1 command post vehicles were known as the M577G and M577A1G. Most M113A1Gs were later upgraded to A2 standard and got the new designator M113A2 GE. Those vehicles that were fitted with external fuel tanks and the new SEM-80/90 radioset are known as M113A2 EFT GE A0. Under the NDV-2 program, some vehicles had been fitted with a new MTU engine, new steering and brake systems etc. German M113s often have a bank of eight 76mm smoke grenade dischargers at the front of the vehicle, and are armed with Rheinmetall MG3s instead of the more common M2 .50 caliber machine gun. The German Army uses the type not only as APC (MTW – Mannschaftstransportwagen) but in many different specialized roles as well:

- Fahrschulpanzer – Driver trainer.
- GefStdPz – (Gefechtsstandpanzer) - M557 Command and control vehicle with a raised roof.
- FlgLtPz – (Fliegerleitpanzer) – Vehicle for forward air controllers (FAC) (retired from service).
- RiFuMuxPz – (Trägerfahrzeug Richtfunk Multiplex) - Direction finding station (retired from service).
- SchrFuTrpPz VHF-HF – (Schreibfunktrupppanzer) - Signals vehicle.
- TrFzRechnVbuArt – (Trägerfahrzeug Rechner-Verbund Artillerie) – Artillery computer vehicle.
- FüFlSt - (Führungs-Feuerleitstelle) – Fire direction center for artillery units equipped with the PzH 2000.
- BeobPzArt (Beobachtungspanzer Artillerie) – Artillery forward observer vehicle with raised roofline and PERI D-11 periscope (retired from service).
- FltPzArt (Feuerleitpanzer Artillerie) – Artillery fire direction vehicle.
- FltPzMrs (Feuerleitpanzer Mörser) – Fire direction vehicle for mortar units (retired from service).
- FüFuPz (Führungs- und Funkpanzer) – Signals and command vehicle (retired from service).
- KrKw (Krankenkraftwagen) – Ambulance, to be replaced by Boxer MRAV.
- PzMrs (Panzermörser) – Mortar carrier with Tampella 120mm and 63 rounds (reactivated).
- TrFz ABRA (Trägerfahrzeug) – Carrier vehicle for DR-PC 1a RATAC radar, to be resplaced by BÜR (ground surveillance radar system, based on Dingo 2).
- TrFz Green Archer (Trägerfahrzeug) – Carrier vehicle for Green Archer artillery location radar (retired from service).
- Waran – Upgrade developed by FFG. Has the same improvement as the NDV-2 versions, but is additionally fitted with a longer hull and improved suspension with 6 road wheels on each side. Also known as M113 King Size.
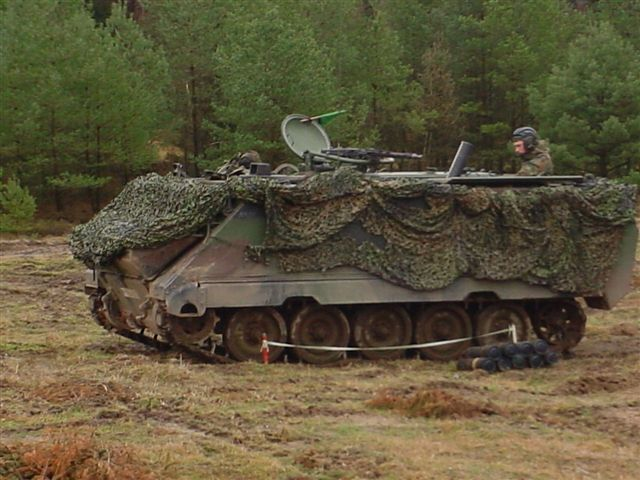
German Army Mortar carrier with NDV-2

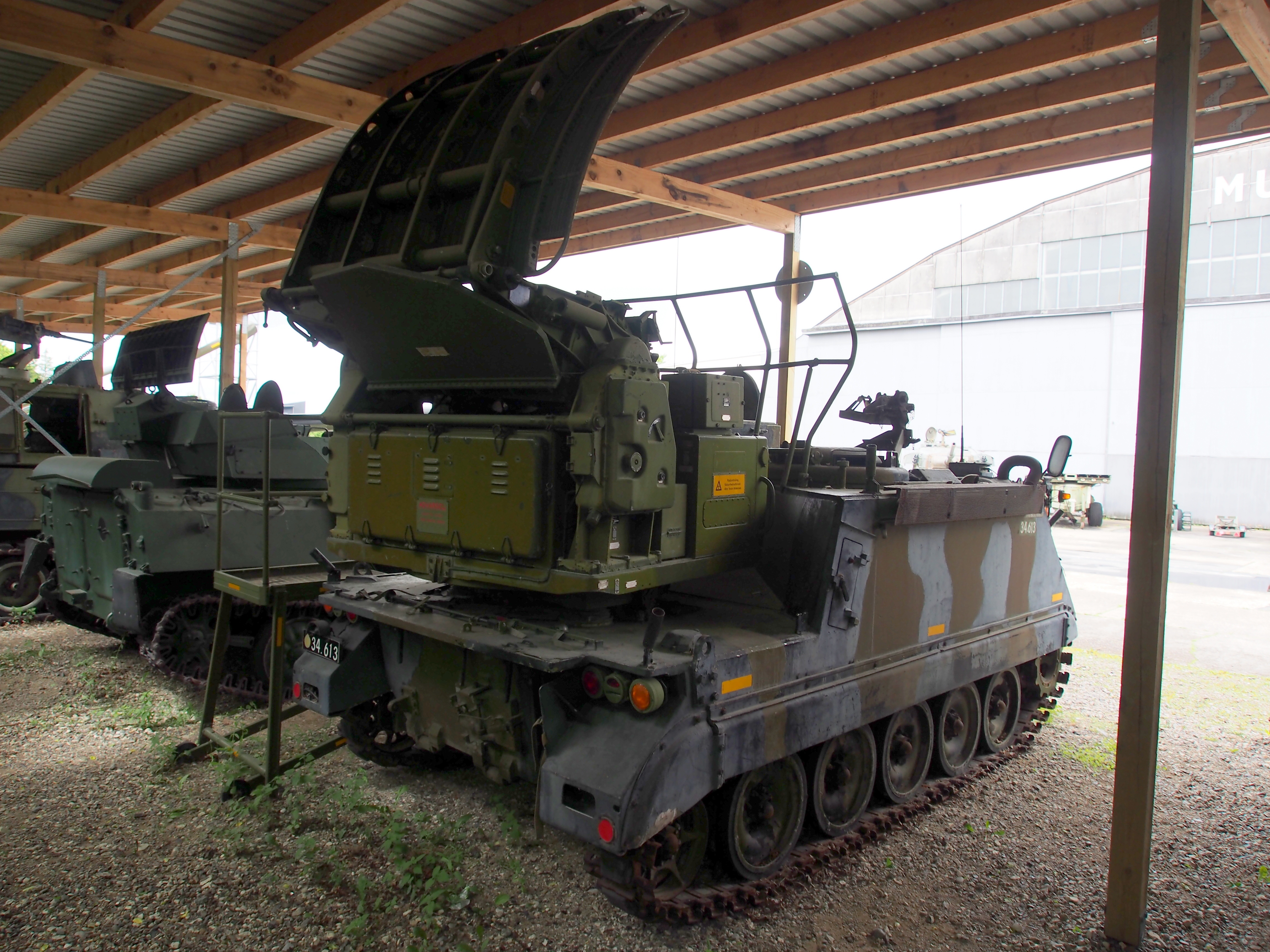
Trägerfahrzeug Green Archer

=== Egypt ===
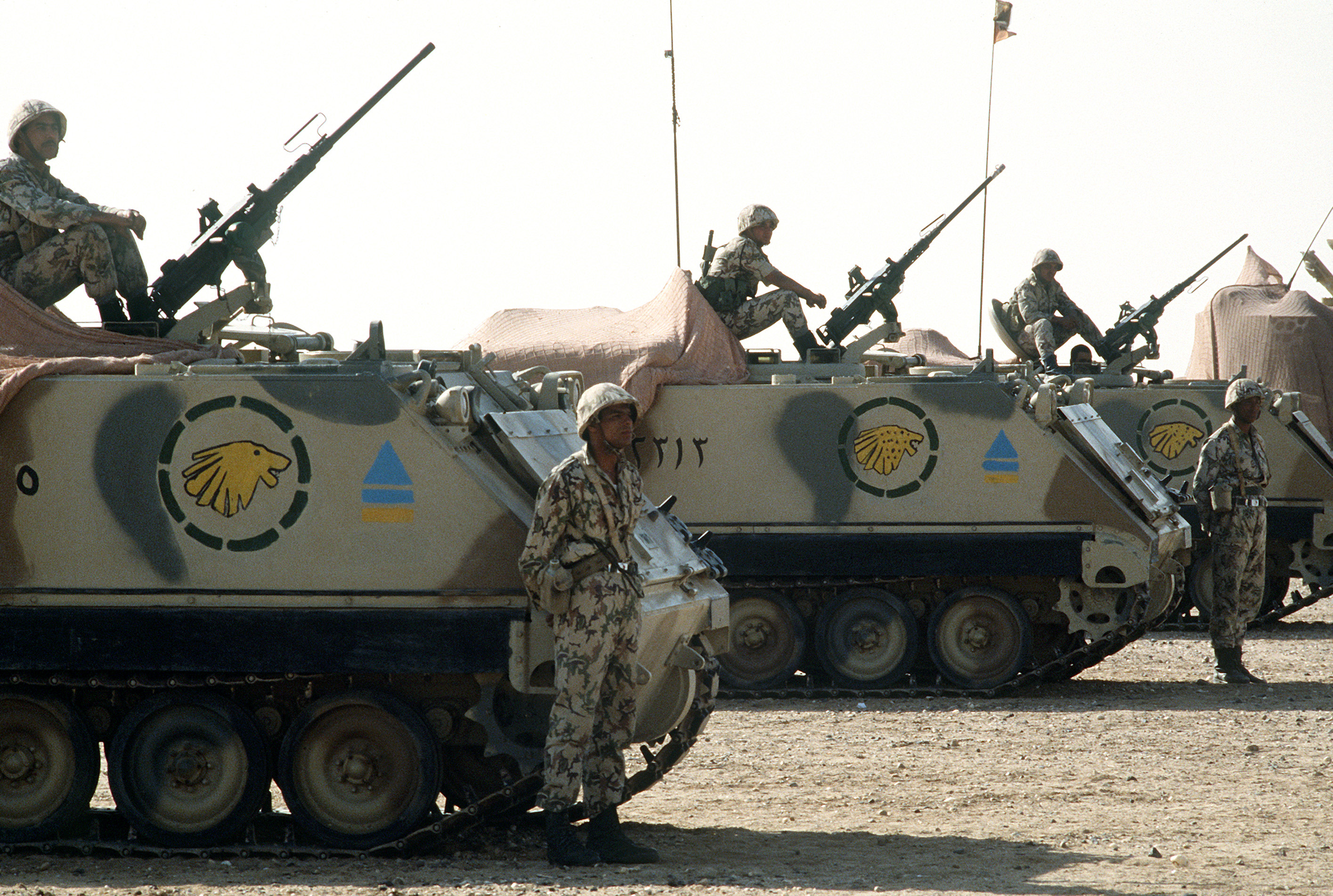
Egyptian troops with their M113s during Operation Desert Shield.

- EIFV – Features an enlarged chassis with improved armor, a more powerful engine, and the addition of M2 Bradley turrets. The vehicle carries a crew of three and six dismount soldiers.
- Uparmored M113 (also known as SIFV) – Basically an M113 fitted with an armor upgrade kit produced in Egypt, allowing the M113 to withstand up to 23 mm armor-piercing rounds, without affecting the vehicle's mobility or amphibious capability. The weight of the additional armor is about 950 kg and within the vehicle permissible load and equipped with the 25 mm KBA-B02 turret. This armor upgrade can also be fitted to variants such as the AIFV or the above-mentioned EIFV.

=== Israel ===
- Bardehlas (Hebrew for cheetah) – Israeli designation of the M113 APC. The name is rarely used as the M113 is usually referred to as Nagmash (APC). In the past M113 was colloquially known as Zelda, but by 1990 the name fell out of use.
- Vayzata ([Biblical name for one of Haman's sons]) – upgraded Bardehlas (M113) with Toga/Vayzata armor suite – perforated steel plates mounted on an external frame around the front and sides of the vehicle. There is also a special command version with additional radio equipment and an auxiliary power unit, typically referred to as Nagmash pikud (command APC).
- Classical – M113 equipped with reactive armor and armored shields around the roof hatches. It was introduced in the mid-1990s and saw action in the Southern Lebanon security zone. The added weight of the armor led to limited mobility and reliability problems and the vehicle was eventually removed from service.
- Nagman (Nagmash Memugan – APC with additional protection) – M113 equipped with Toga armor suite, an open-topped hexagonal superstructure around the commander's hatch and armored shields on the sides of the rear roof hatch.
- Kasman (Kesem ha-Mangina – The Charm of Music) – an urban warfare / counter-insurgency upgrade of Nagman developed just before the Al-Aqsa Intifada. The superstructure became a fully closed one and the shields were extended.
- Magen or Kasman Magen or Kasman Meshupar – equipped with Toga armor suite, a large armored superstructure around the roof hatches and external fuel tanks. Developed in the early 2000s.
- Maoz or Kasman Maoz – Similar to Magen, but with a smaller superstruture. Developed in the early 2000s.
- Giraf – M113 with a TOW launcher.
- Hafiz – M113 with a 6-tube Spike NLOS ATGM launcher.
- Hovet, also spelled Chovet – Israeli designation for the M163 VADS.
- Machbet – an Israeli upgrade of the M163 VADS. In addition to the 20 mm M61 Vulcan rotary cannon, it is armed with a four-tube FIM-92 Stinger surface-to-air missile launcher.
- Nagmash Mahag – Israeli designation of the M579 Fitter.
- Nagmash Hatap, also spelled Chatap – a field repair vehicle for carrying spare parts and equipment specific to the vehicles it is tasked to support.
- Mugaf – Israeli designation of the M577 command post carrier.
- Alfa – Israeli designation of the M548 cargo carrier.
- Shilem – unarmored vehicle equipped with EL-M-2310 radar for artillery forces.
- M113 AMEV – Armored Medical Evacuation Vehicle. A specifically modified and equipped M113 for use as an armored ambulance.
- M113 HVMS – a prototype armed with a 60mm HVMS gun in a lightweight turret.
- M113 L-VAS – a prototype equipped with Light Vehicle Armour System (L-VAS).
- Urban Fighter – IMI developed modification, with upgraded "Iron Wall" armor, capable of repelling IED and EFP attacks.
- Keshet – 120 mm mortar carrier.
- Nagmachol - An unofficial nickname for M113s that were laid with sandbags around the interior walls to protect from rifle bullets.
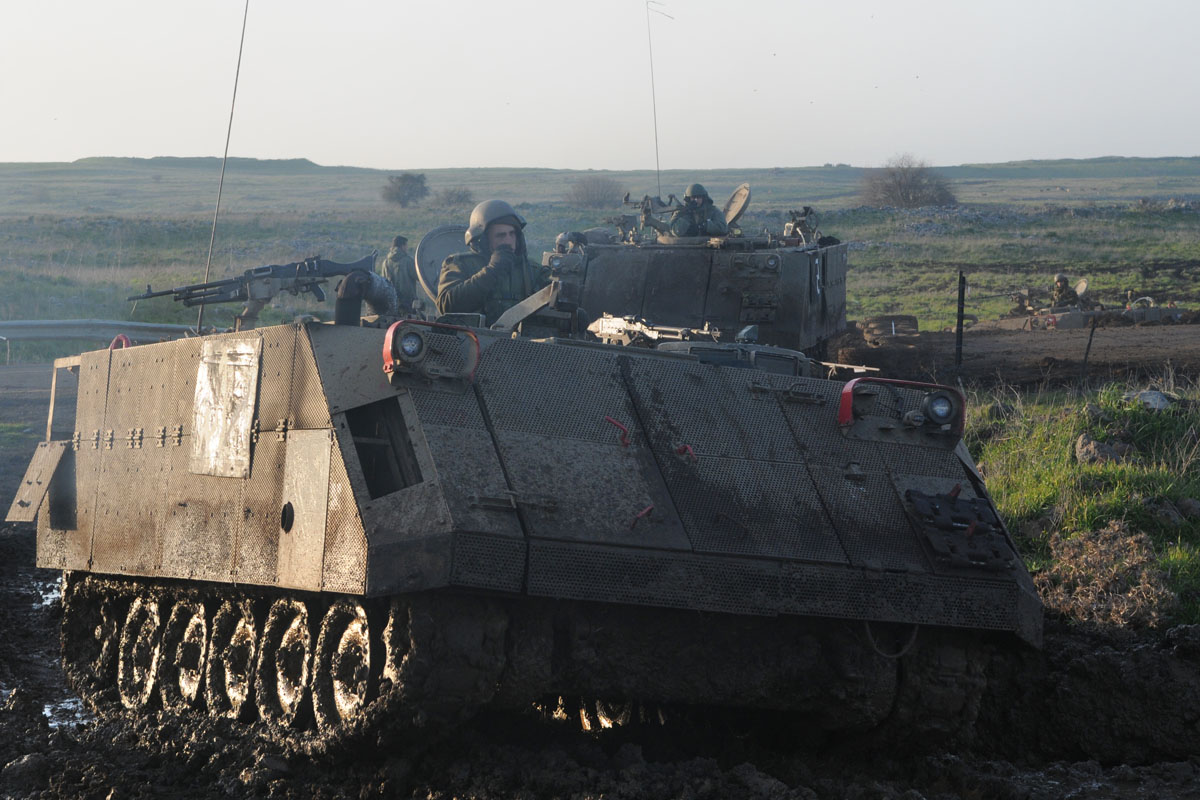
M113 with Vayzata armor

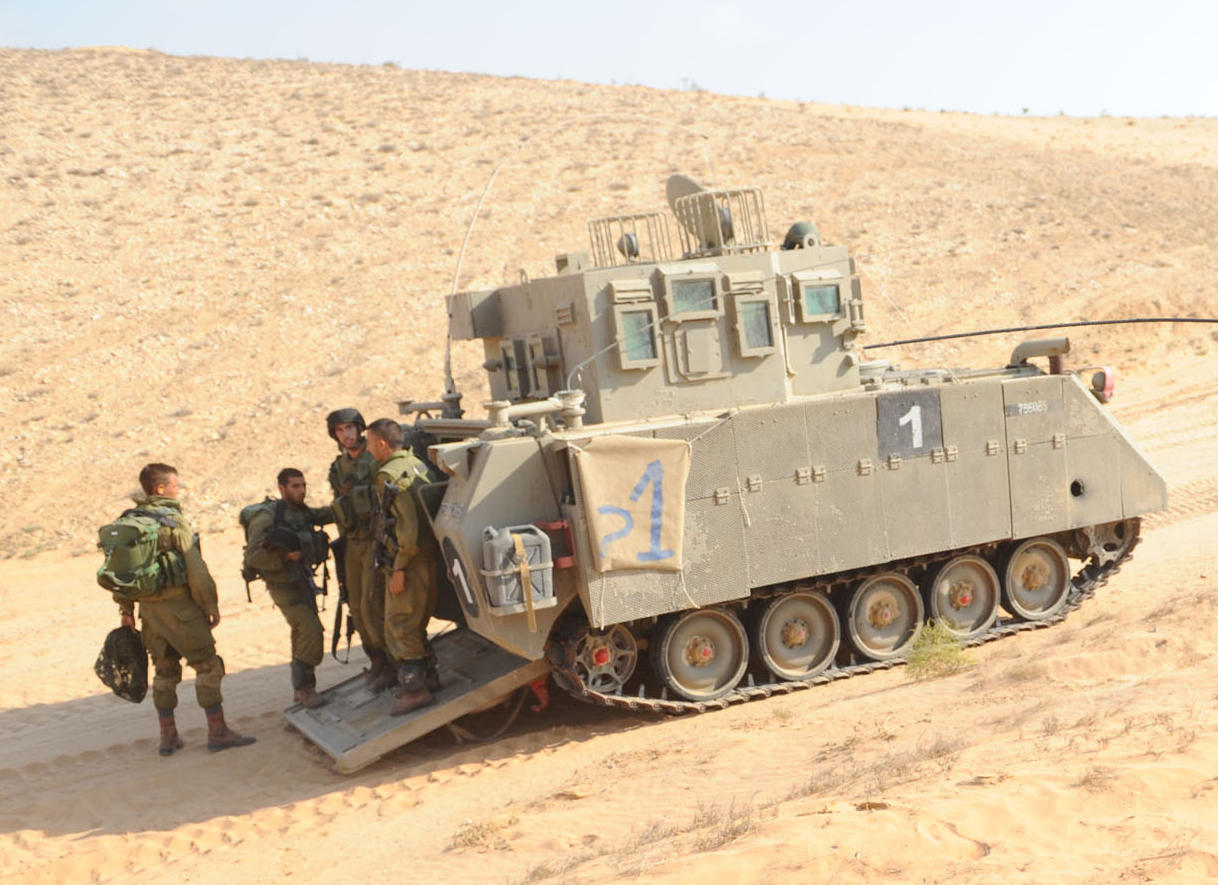
Kasman Magen

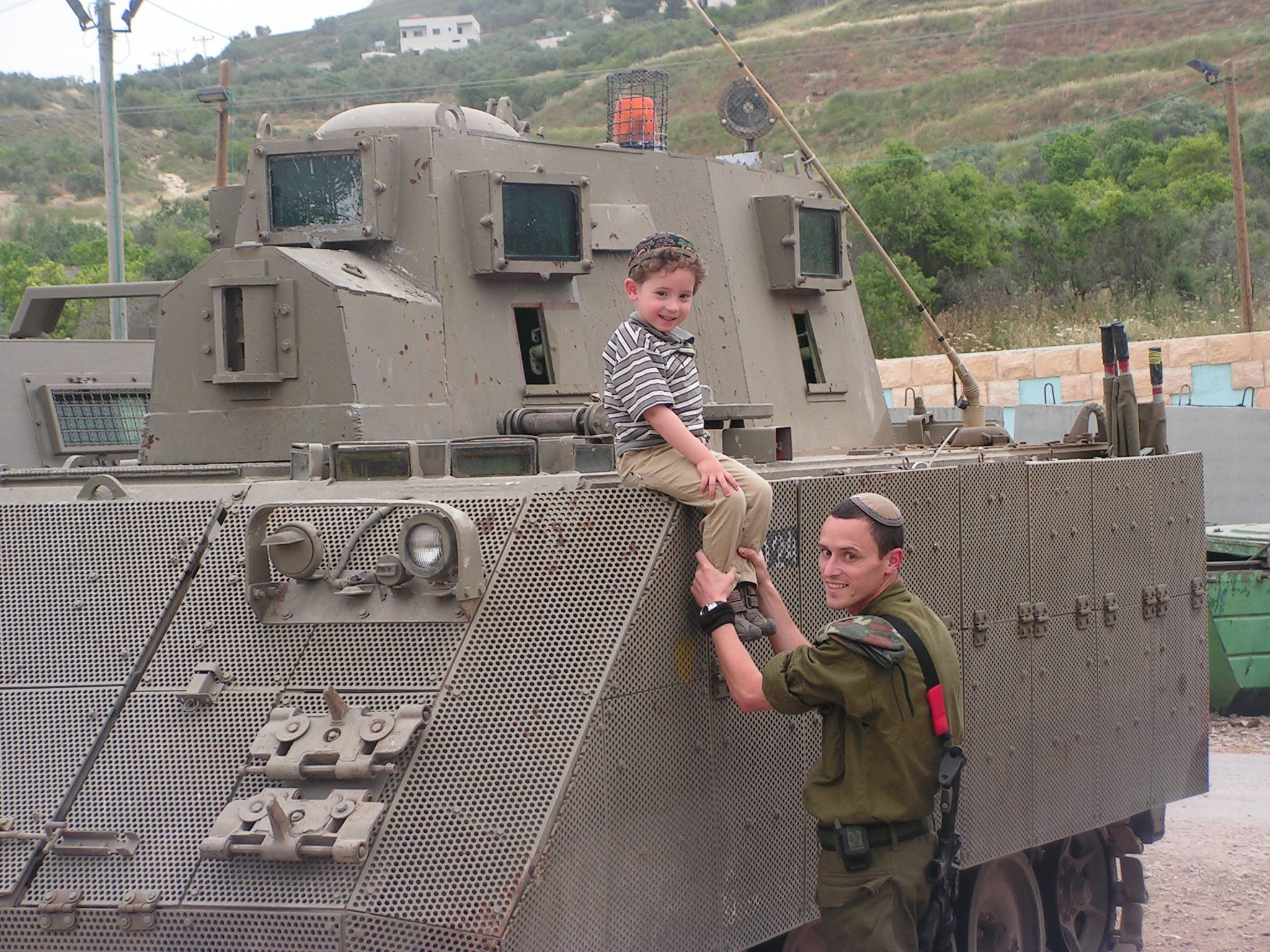
Kasman Maoz

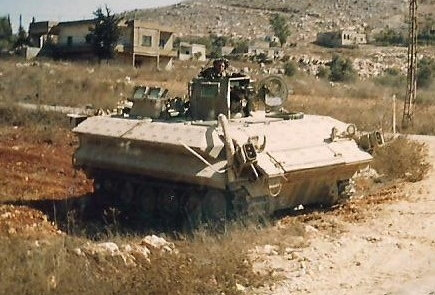
Classical

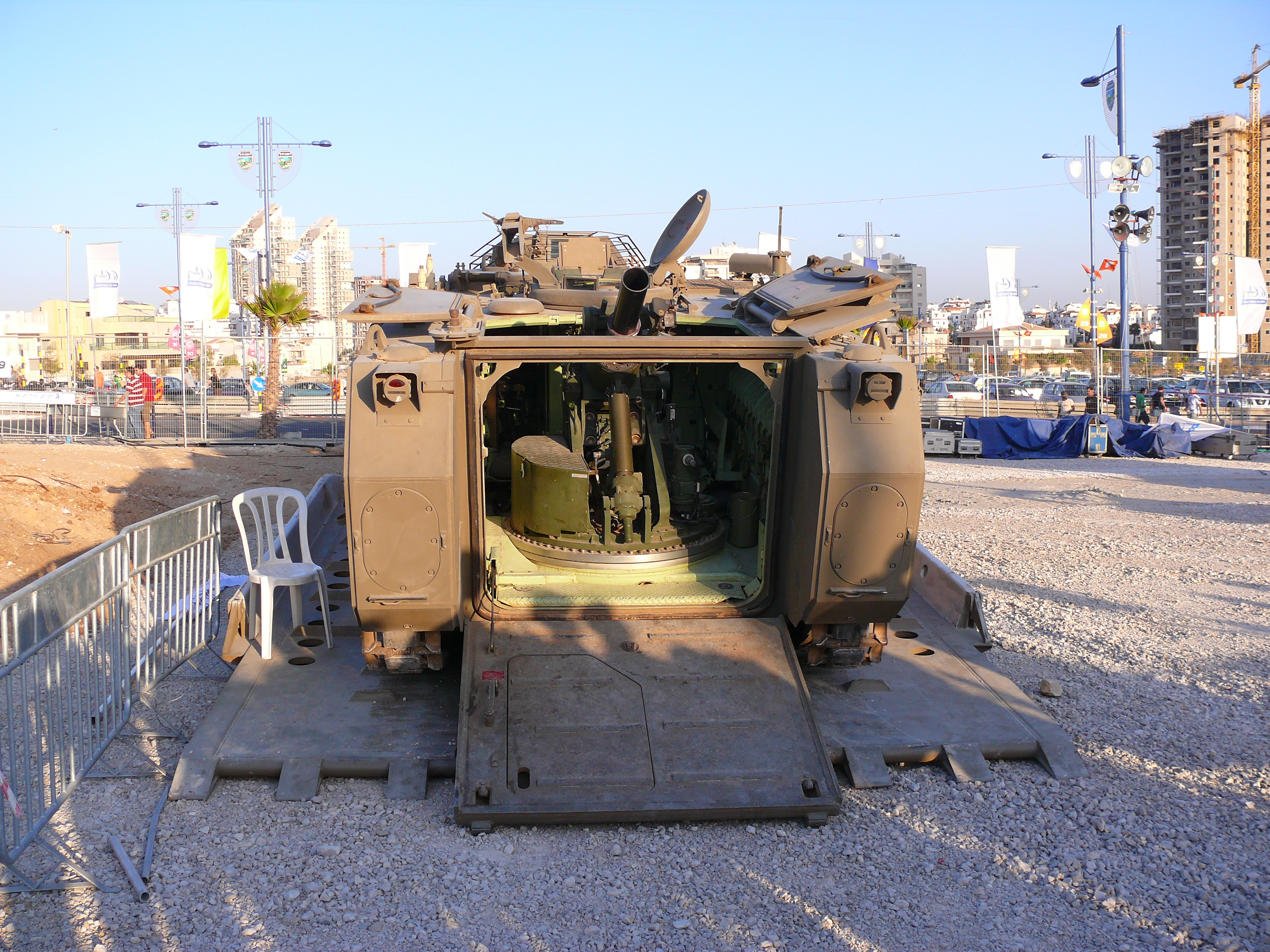
Keshet mortar carrier

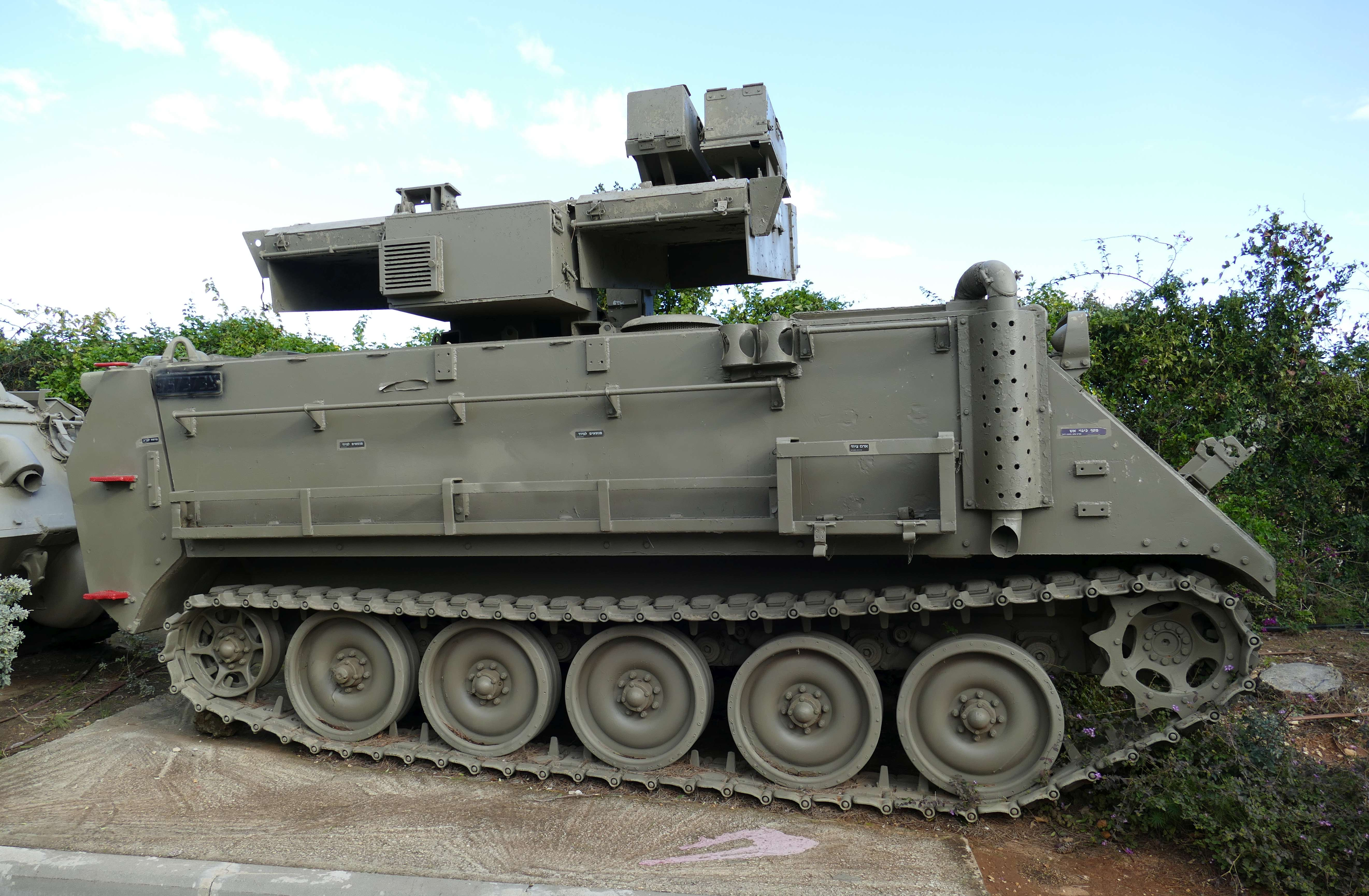
Hafiz ATGM carrier

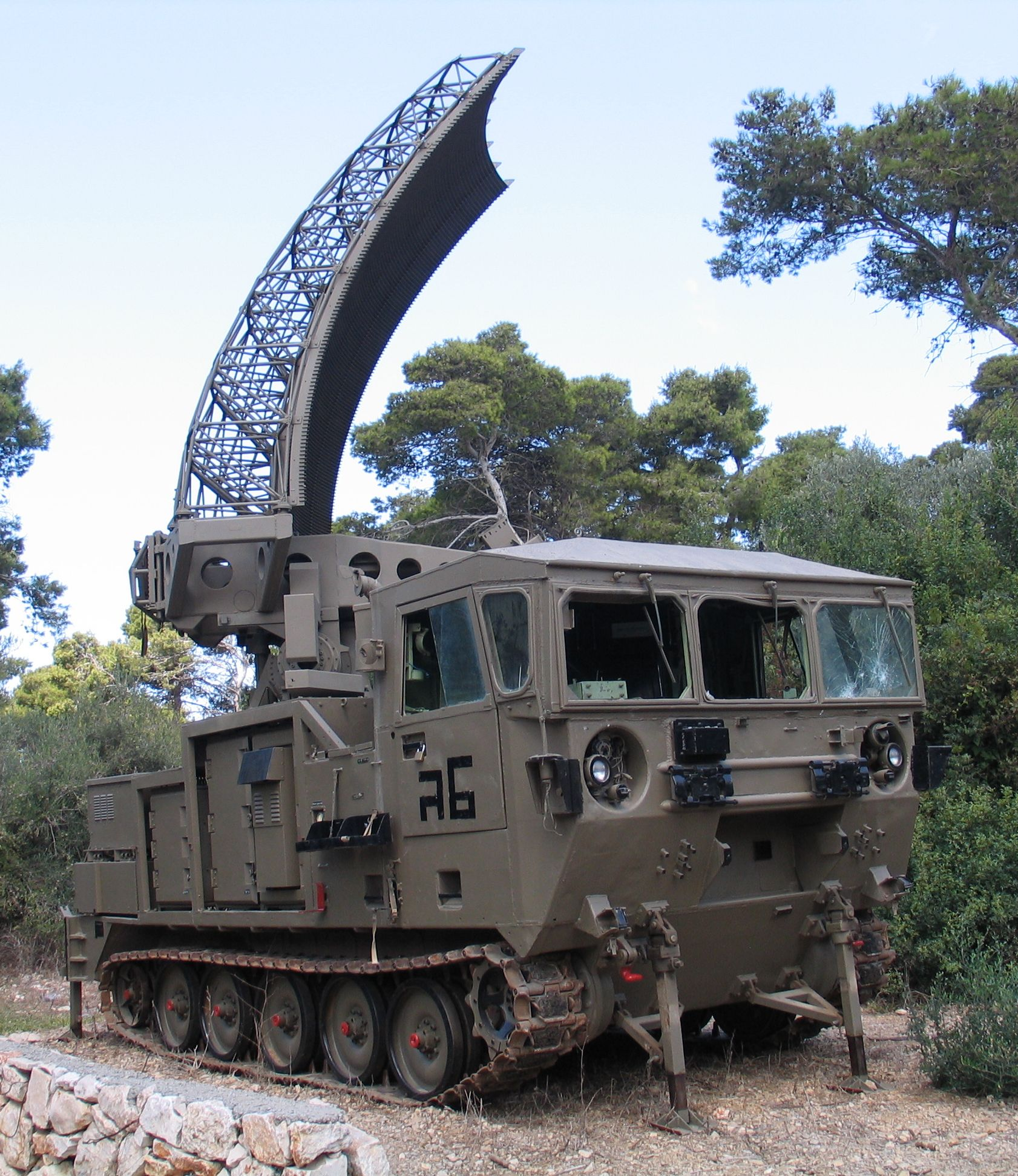
Shilem radar vehicle

=== Italy ===
- Arisgator – The Italian company Aris has developed a fully amphibious version of the M113 called Arisgator. This version carries the same number of troops as the normal M113.
- VCC-1 – Oto Melara 7 passengers improved XM765 ( M113A1 ) with rear and side sloped armor, firing ports, Browning M2 shields and smoke-grenade launchers; 600 to 800 produced (200 of them with TUA launchers, exported to Saudi Arabia)
- VCC-2 – Oto Melara VCC-1 improved version without rear sloped armor (11 passengers); about 1,230 produced by updating older gasoline M113.
- VTC-9
- M113 CESV
- SIDAM 25 – A self-propelled anti-aircraft weapon 276 made by upgrading old M113 plus about 150 for 25 mm ammo supply.
- M113 with 120 mm mortar, a M113 version developed with a French 120 mm in the place of the 107 mm US mortar. Several hundreds made, 150 of them were exported to Libya in the 1980s.

=== Jordan ===
Jordan received 150 M577 Command Post vehicles as a gift from the United States in February 2018.

=== Lebanon ===
- M113A1 with ZU-23
- M113A1 with ZPU-4
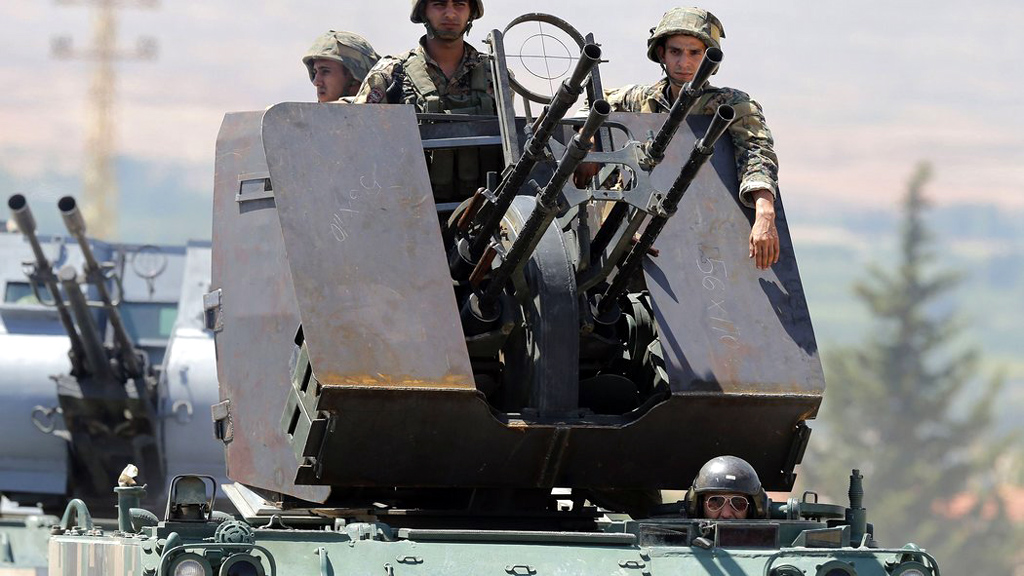
M113A1 ZPU-4

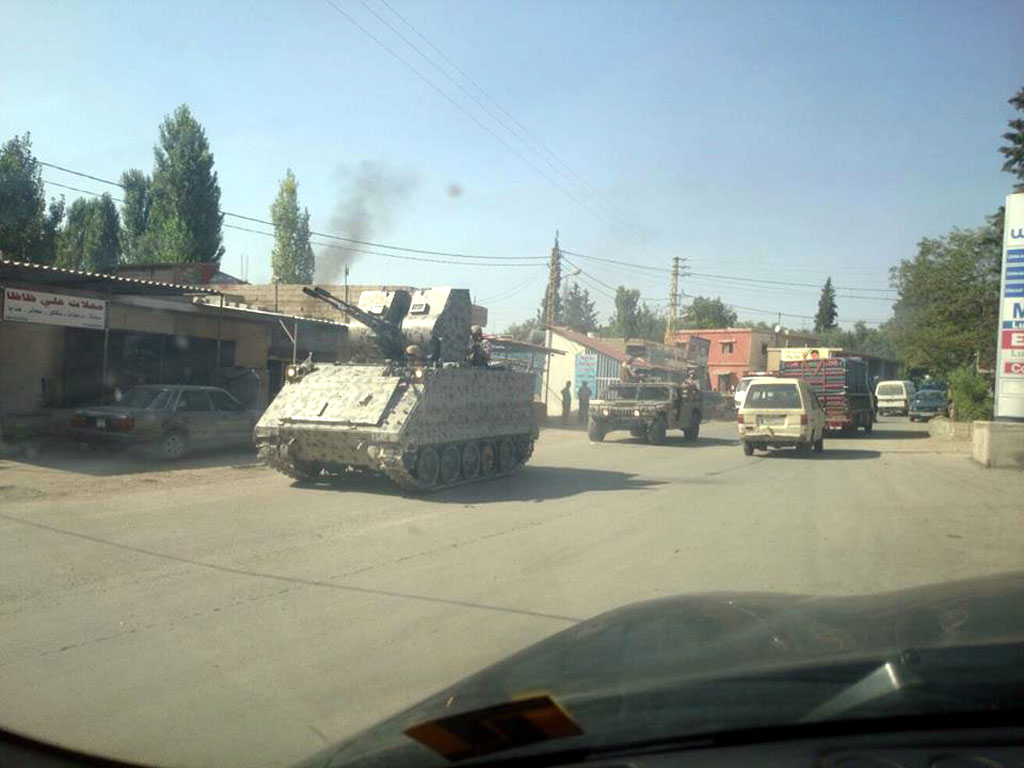
M113A1 ZU-23

=== Netherlands ===
- M113A1 – The normal M113A1 APC, used for the infantry groups of the cavalry reconnaissance battalions and independent cavalry reconnaissance squadrons as well by the Koninklijke Marechaussee, the Dutch military police.
- M113A1 PGN – Pantser GeNie. M113A1 equipped with engineering and demolition equipment, in use by armoured engineer companies.
- M113 C&V – Commando & Verkenning. Dutch version of the M113 Lynx, initially equipped with a Browning M2 .50 heavy machine gun in a remote controlled cupola, afterwards modified with an Oerlikon KBA 25mm autocannon in a manually operated turret.
- M106 – Mortar carrier with 81 mm mortar, in service with the cavalry reconnaissance battalions and squadrons.
- M113A1 GWT – Gewonden Transport. A specifically modified and equipped M113 for use as an armored ambulance.
- M577 – Command post vehicle, used by cavalry reconnaissance battalions and squadrons, artillery battalion and battery headquarters as well as brigade level headquarters.
- M113A1 RDR – Radar M113A1 equipped with a battlefield surveillance radar system used by cavalry reconnaissance battalions and squadrons.
- M806 – Locally known as 'YPR-806 A1 PRB' (PRB = Pantser Rups Berging (Armoured Tracked Recovery Vehicle)). Repair and recovery vehicle in use with units equipped with the AIFV.
- M688 – Lance missile transport/loader vehicle based on the M548.
- M752 – Self-propelled launcher for MGM-52 Lance tactical surface-to-surface missile (tactical ballistic missile) system, in service with the nuclear capable 129 Afdeling Veldartillerie (129 Field Artillery Battalion).
- AIFV – A development of the M113A1 APC, upgraded with an enclosed turret and firing ports.

=== Norway ===
288 M113s have been rebuilt and upgraded as a part of Project 5026, and all vehicles have received new rubber band tracks, exterior fuel tanks (to create more space inside), new intercom, new interior and command and control systems. In addition, the upgraded M113s come in three versions mainly based on the level of protection:

- F1 – Vehicle with fragmentation protection (spall-liner).
- F2 – Vehicle with fragmentation and mine protection.
- F3 – Vehicle with fragmentation and mine protection, additional armor protection and a new engine.

Furthermore, a fourth variant, the M113F4, has been developed, but it was ultimately set aside in favor of FFG's ACSV, which is based on the PMMC G5.

List of Norwegian M113 variants:

- NM106 (Bombekastervogn) – Norwegian variant of the M113 similar to the M106 mortar carrier.
- NM113 RFK – equipped with M40 recoilless rifle.
- NM113 RAKPV – Norwegian variant of the M113 similar to the M150, equipped with BGM-71 TOW anti-tank missile.
- NM125 (Bombekastervogn) – Norwegian variant of the M113 similar to the M125 mortar carrier, with an 81mm M29 mortar carrier.
- NM135 (Stormpanservogn) – Norwegian variant of the M113A1 with a 20mm Rheinmetall MK2020 machine cannon with a 7.62mm coaxial machine gun in a turret. The 20 mm gun had a firing rate of about 900 rounds/min. Retired from service.
  - NM135F1 – Version with additional spall liners. Retired from service.
- NM142 (Rakettpanserjager) – Anti-tank variant of the M113A2 used by the Norwegian army, equipped with the Armoured Launching Turret, developed in Norway by Kvaerner Eureka. The ALT contains a TOW-2 guided anti-tank missile system with one launch tube on either side of the turret. Additionally, mounted on the commander's hatch, there is a Rheinmetall MG3 machine gun for use as secondary armament and in situations where the TOW-2 system is unsuitable. Retired from service.
  - NM142F1 – Version with additional spallliners. Retired from service.
- NM194 (Ildlederpanservogn, luftvern) – M113A2 air-defense command vehicle. Retired from service.
- NM195 (Luftvernpanservogn) – M113A2 air-defense variant with RBS-70. Retired from service.
- NM196 (Hjelpeplasspanservogn) - Medical treatment version of M577A2.
  - NM196F1 – Version with additional spall-liners.
  - NM196F3 – Version with upgraded driveline, caterpillar engine, add-on armor and redesigned interior/treatment facilities
- NM197 (Replagspanservogn) – Armored maintenance vehicle, based on the M806.
- NM198 (Kommandopanservogn) – Modified command variant of the M577A2.
  - NM198F1 – Version with additional spall-liners.
- NM199 (Transportpanservogn) - New designator for modified M548A1.
- NM200 (Ambulansepanservogn) – Ambulance version of M113A2.
  - NM200F1 – Version with additional spall-liners.
  - NM200F3 – Version with upgraded driveline, caterpillar engine, add-on armor and redesigned interior/treatment facilities
- NM201 (Ildlederpanservogn, artilleri) – M113A2-based vehicle for artillery forward observers. This variant is fitted with the VINTAQS observation system on a 2m mast. It consists of a thermal camera, VingRange laser range finder, VingEye CCD-camera and GPS.
  - NM201F1 – Version with additional spall-liners.
  - NM201F3 – Version with additional spall-liners, mine protection, additional passive armor and new power-pack.
- NM202 (Ledelsespanservogn) – Command variant of the M113A2.
  - NM202F1 – Version with additional spall-liners.
  - NM202F3 – Version with additional spall-liners, mine protection, additional passive armor and new power-pack.
- NM203 (Bombekaster KO panservogn)
- NM204 (Bombekasterpanservogn 81MM) – Upgrade of the M125A2 mortar carrier.
- NM205 (Stormingeniørpanservogn) – Variant of the M113A2 for combat engineers, fitted with mine clearing rollers or ploughs.
  - NM205F1 – Version with additional spall-liners.
  - NM205F3 – Version with additional spall-liners, mine protection, additional passive armor and new power-pack.
- NM209 (Panservogn, personnel) – Modified APC, based on the M113A2.
- NM216 (TADKOM-knutepunktvogn) – Signals vehicle.

=== Pakistan ===
- Talha is a Pakistani License made version of the M113-A2-Mk.1 APC. It is manufactured by Heavy Industries Taxila.
- Maaz – Fitted with Baktar-Shikan anti-tank missile firing unit.
- Mouz – Fitted with RBS 70 surface-to-air missile firing unit.
- Sakb – Command post vehicle.
- Al Qaswa – Logistics & cargo vehicle.

Sakb variant

=== Philippines ===
- M113A1 – The legacy M113A1 vehicles were acquired from 1967 onwards.
  - XM806E1 – armored recovery vehicle variant.
  - M113A1 Combat Support Vehicle (CSV) – Philippine Army variant of the M113 fitted with the turret of the V-150 Commando.
  - M113A1 Fire Support Vehicle (FSV) – Philippine Army variant of the M113A1 fitted with the 76mm low pressure gun turret of the FV101 Scorpion.
  - M113A1 Mortar Carriers – Philippine Army variant of the M113A1 converted for use as an armoured mortar carrier.
- M113A2 – The US 'Excess Defense Articles (EDA)' programme allowed the Philippine Army to acquire 114 M113A2 vehicles from US stocks, with deliveries beginning in 2012. Another acquisition saw the Philippine Army acquire 28 more M113A2 vehicles, which Elbit Systems will upgrade under the terms of a $19.7 million contract.
  - M113A2 Fire Support Vehicle (FSV) – 14 Fire Support Vehicles (FSV) will be equipped with the turrets of decommissioned Alvis Scorpion armoured reconnaissance vehicles, a new fire control system and thermal imaging system. The two-person Scorpion turret is armed with a 76 mm L23A1 gun and a 7.62 mm co-axial machine gun (MG) with day/image intensification sights. Four of the M113A2 will be equipped a 25 mm cannon mounted in an Elbit Remote Control Weapon Station (RC WS), six will have an RC WS mounting a 12.7mm machine gun.
  - M113A2 Armoured Recovery Vehicle (ARV) – Four M113A2s will be configured as ARVs.
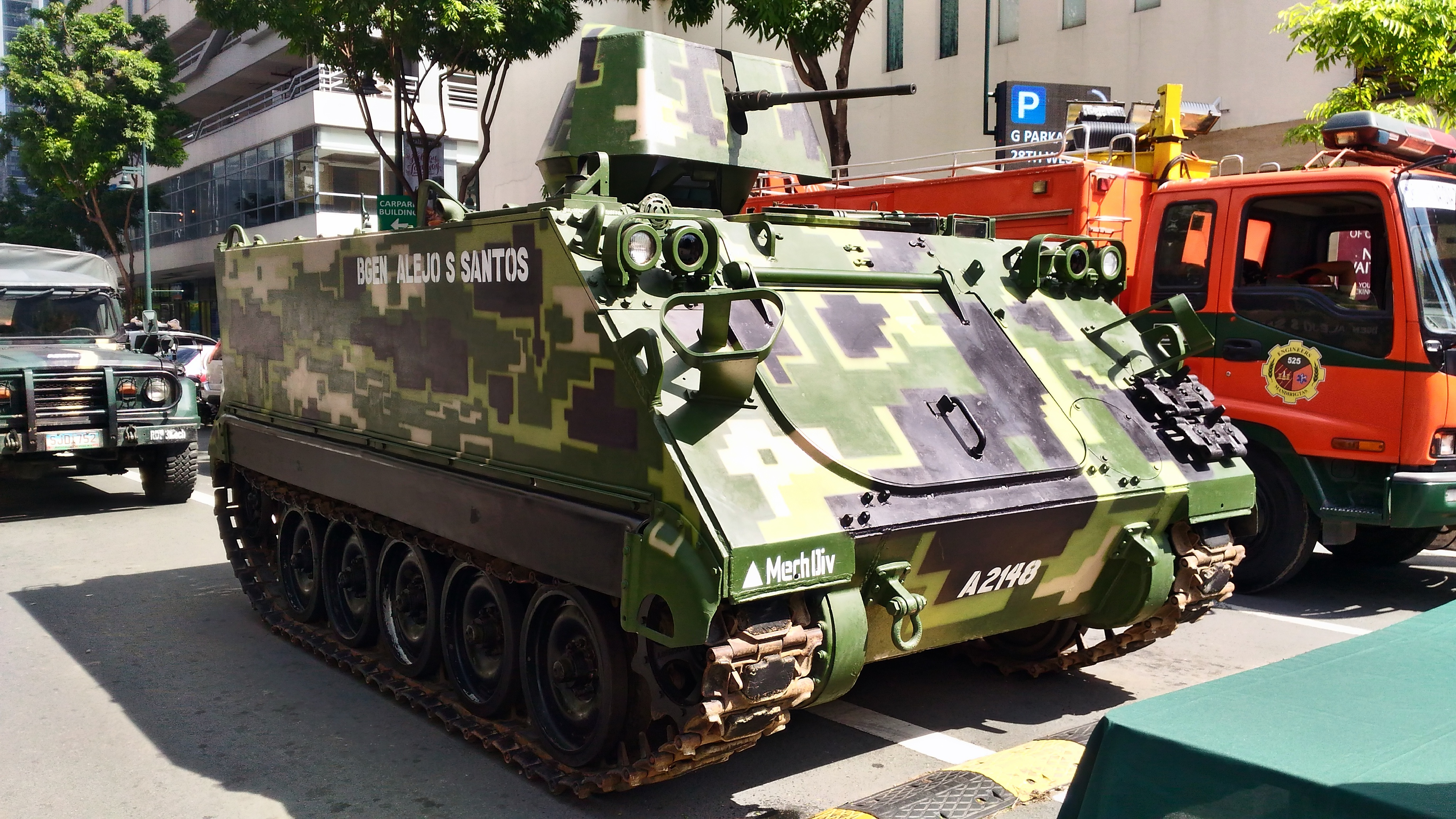
Standard M113

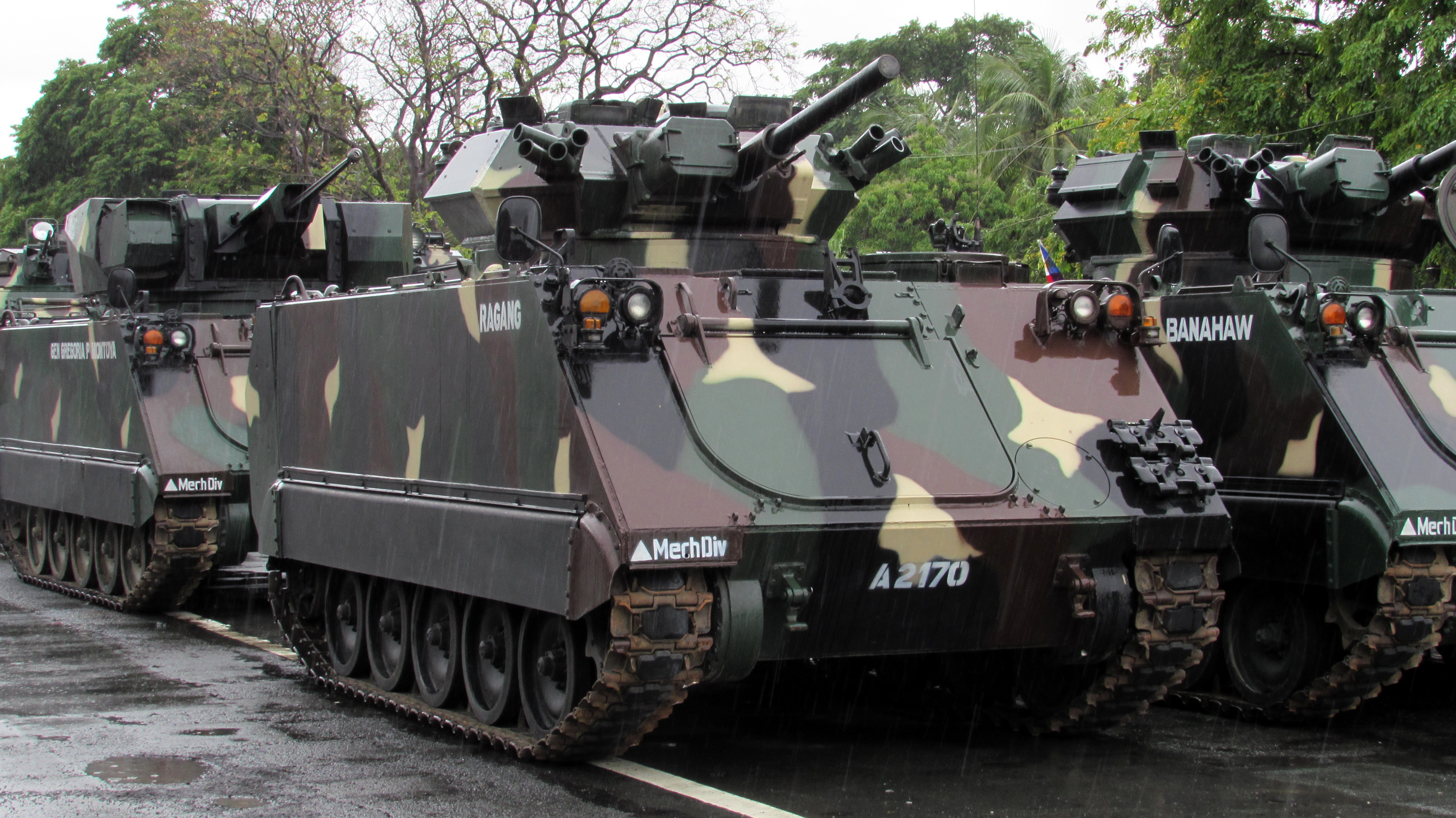
M113A2 with 76 mm guns

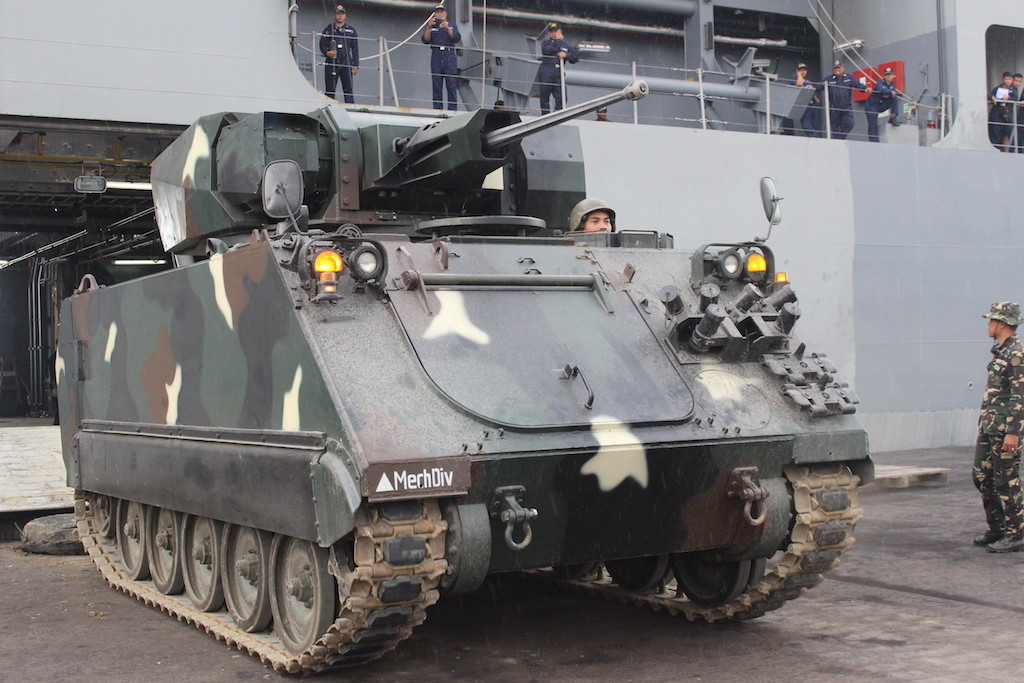
M113A2 with UT30 25mm RCWS

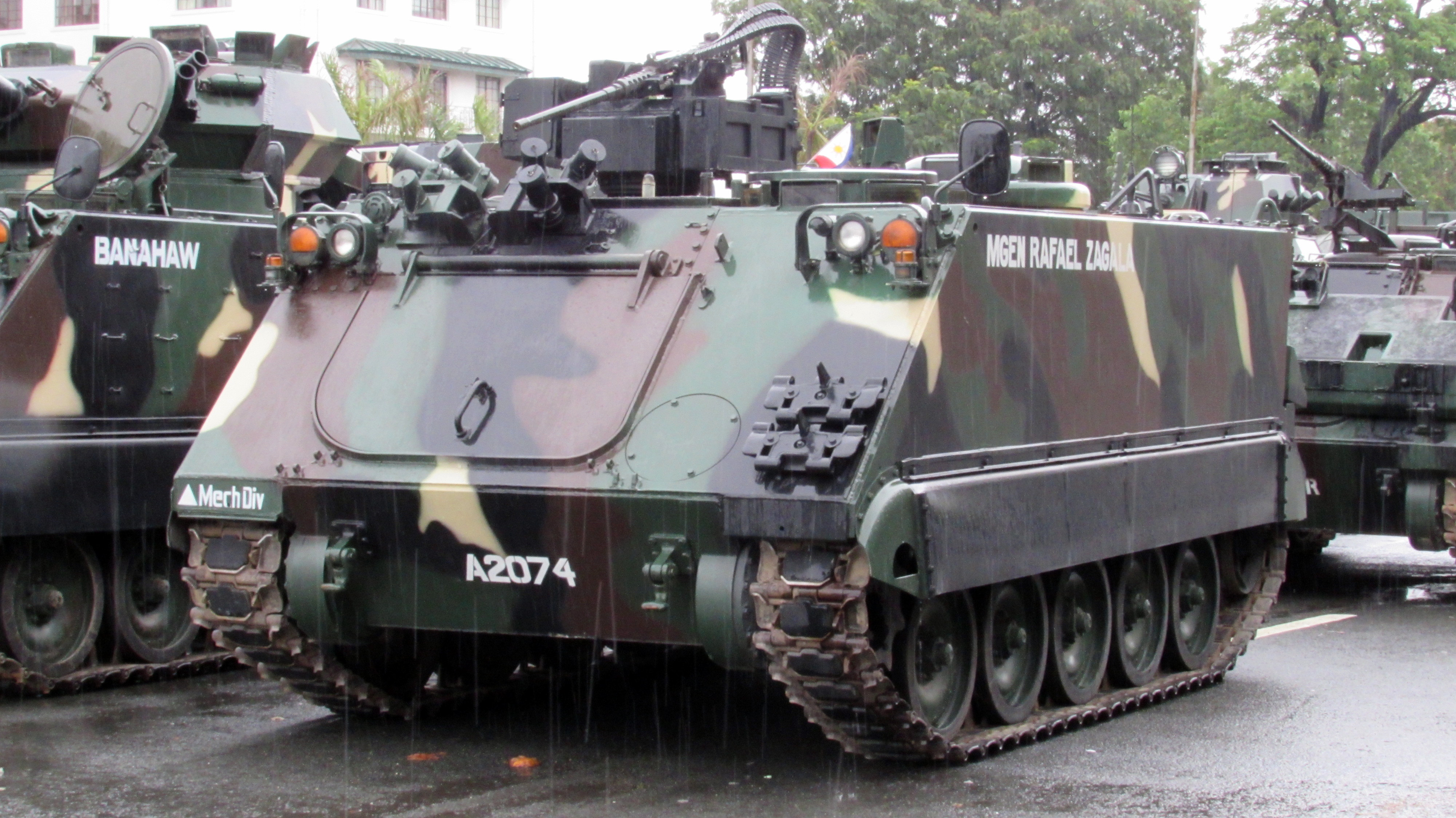
M113A2 with 12.7mm RCWS

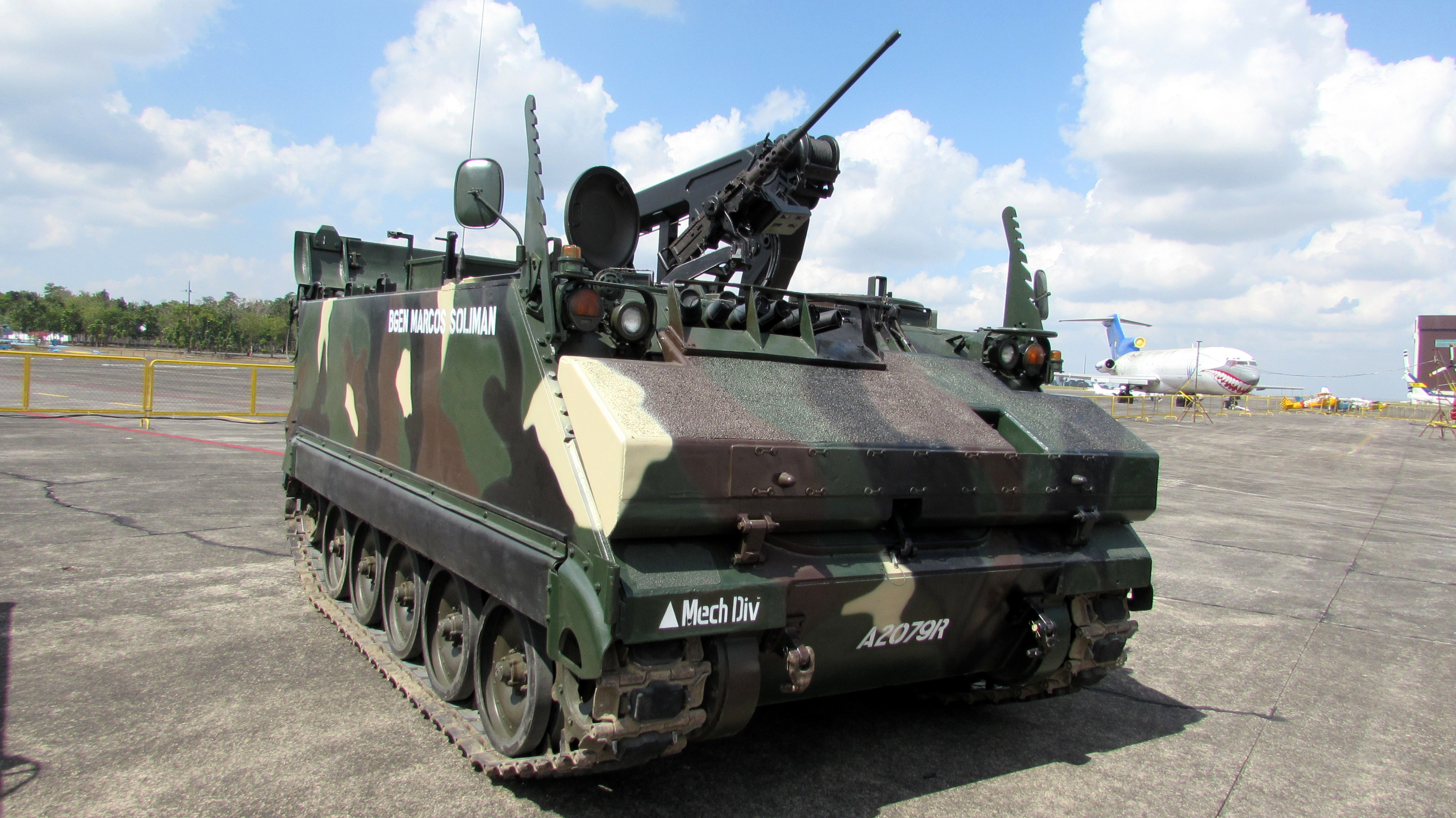
M113 Armored Recovery Vehicle

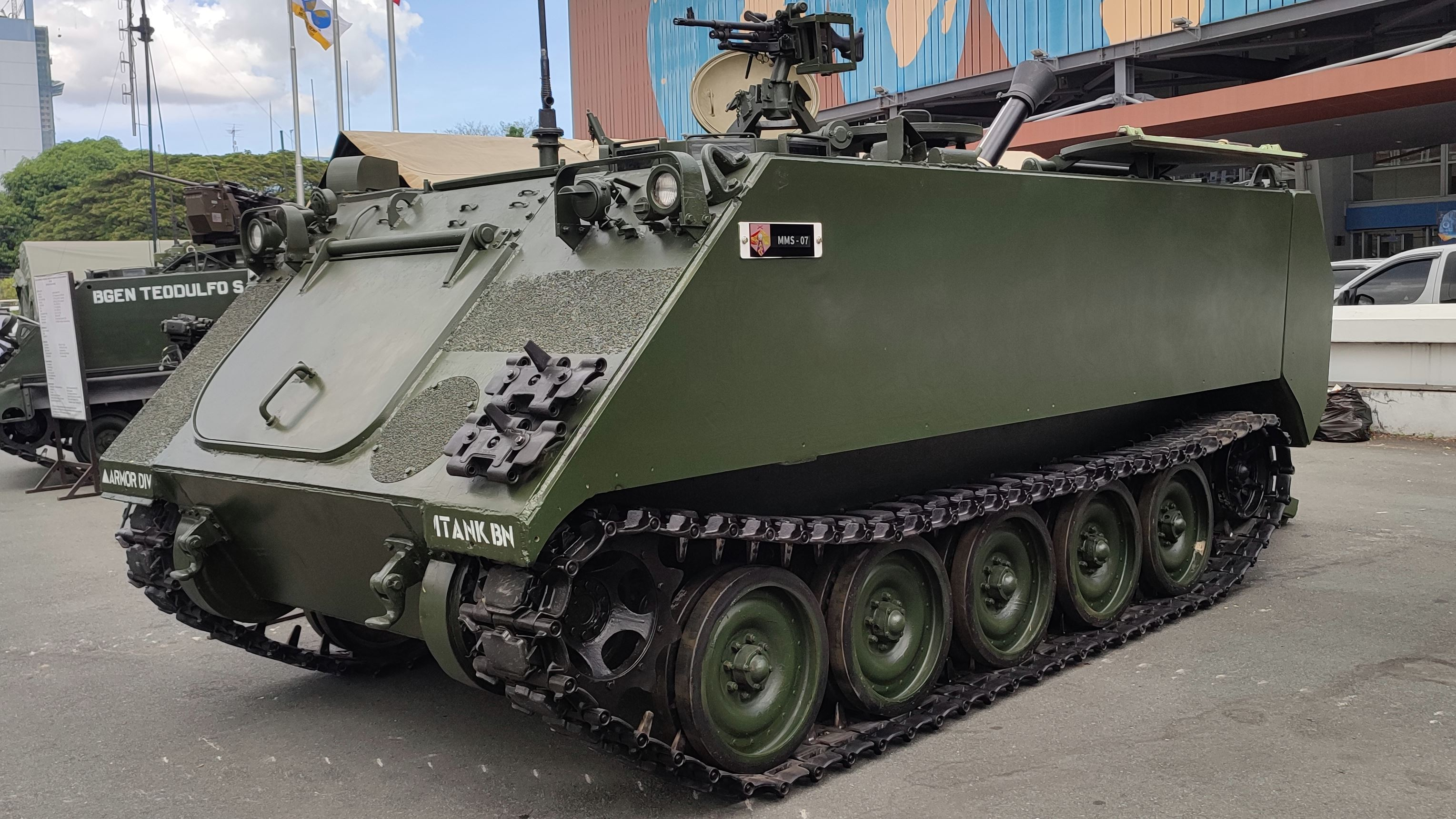
M125A2 Armored Mortar Carrier

=== Portugal ===
The Portuguese Army operates 190 (of 255 delivered) in the A1 and A2 variants of the basic M113 armored personnel carrier (M113 A1/2 M/76 a 90, or simply M113). Besides the M113 APC, the Portuguese Army operates 107mm mortar carriers, 81mm mortar carriers, self-propelled surface-to-air missile systems, TOW anti-tank guided missile tank destroyers, tracked cargo carriers, ambulance, command and communications variants of the M113.

- M577A2 (M577) – The Portuguese Army has received 68 M577A2 command post carriers. The first ones were received in late 1970s; currently 49 are in service:
  - M577A2 M/81 ACP (M577) – 46 in service, as command vehicles.
  - M577A2 M/85 Ambulance (M577) – 3 in service, as ambulance vehicles.
- M730 / M48A3 (Chaparral) – The Portuguese Army has operated 34 M730 self-propelled surface-to-air missile systems, today it operates 25 vehicles. In service with the Portuguese Army since 1990. Portugal initially received 30 M730 in the A2 variant and afterwards 4 vehicles in the A3 variant.
- M901 ITV (M901/TOW) - The Portuguese Army received 4 M901 ITV in 1990; these are still in service. The Portuguese Army made 17 similar vehicles using M113A2 APCs and TOW launchers. The major difference between the variants is that the latter type had a single launcher instead of the twin launcher of the M901.
- M106/A2 mortar carrier – 10 M106 and 8 M106A2, equipped with 107mm M30 mortar.
- M125A1/A2 mortar carrier – 3 M125A1 and 12 M125A2, equipped with 81mm M29 mortar.
- M548 – 24 M548 used by the Mechanized Brigade to carry ammunition to the M109A5 self-propelled howitzers.
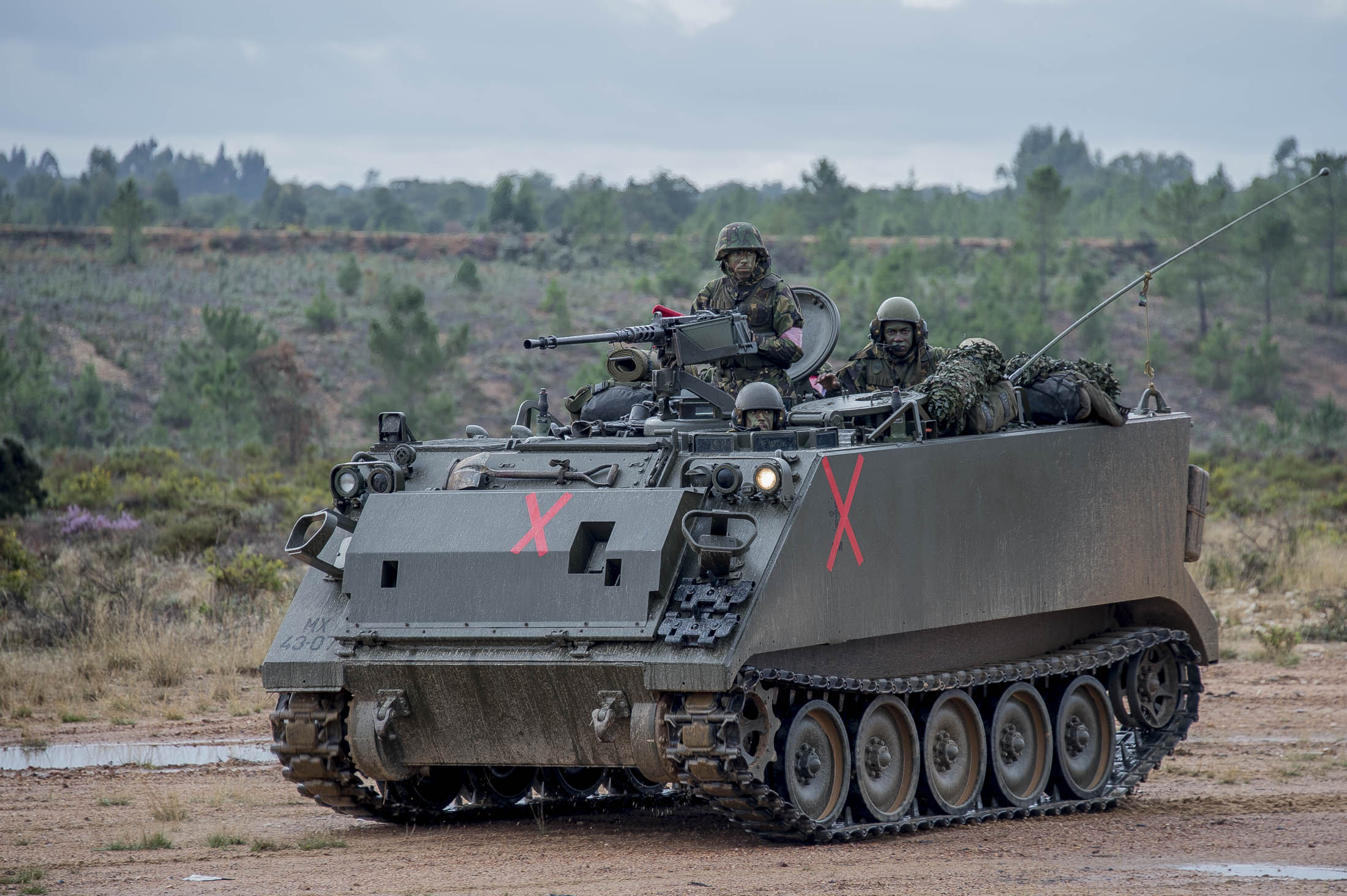
An M113 armored personnel carrier of the Portuguese Army

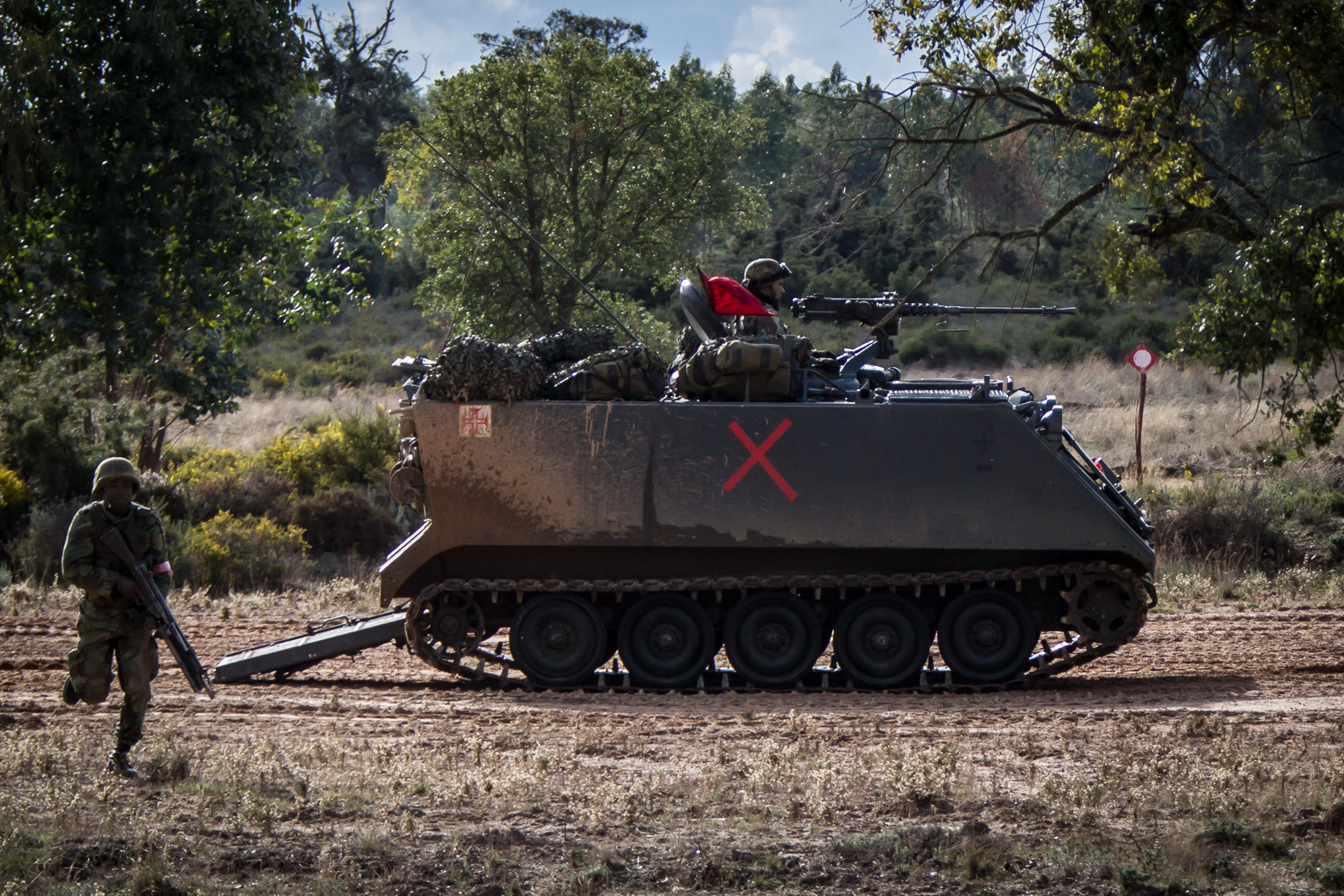
Portuguese M113 during an exercise

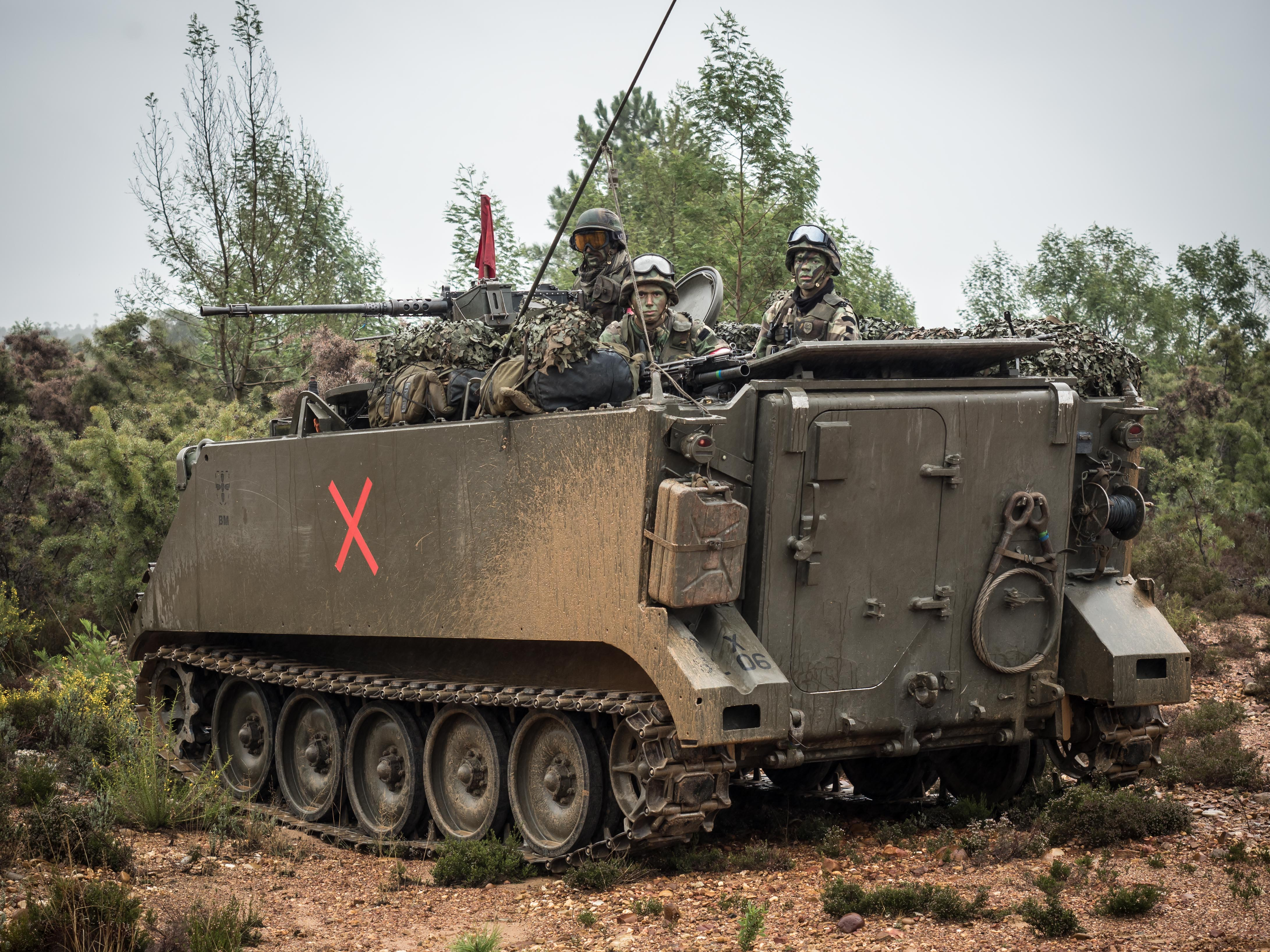
Portuguese Mechanized Infantry M113, Trident Juncture 15

=== Singapore ===
- M113A2 Ultra IFV – Originally an M113A1, it was upgraded to that of A2 standard and modernized by ST Kinetics with a locally built gun-turret cupola-mounted CIS 40 mm AGL (Automatic Grenade Launcher) and CIS 0.5-inch HMG (Heavy Machine Gun) twin-type weapon station or the Israeli Rafael Overhead Weapon Station with the US M242 Bushmaster 25 mm caliber auto-cannons plus improved armour. This Singapore-upgraded M113 version is operated by the Armour Formation of the Singapore Army. Today, it is gradually being replaced by the locally designed Bionix Infantry Fighting Vehicle (IFV) as well as the Bronco twin-carriage tracked armoured personnel carrier (APC).
- M113A2 Ultra Mechanised Igla – Of the same as the one above, but armed with six ready-to-fire Soviet Igla SAMs (surface-to-air missiles) and configured for the role of short-range air defense (SHORAD). The Integrated Fire Unit (IFU) variant is equipped with an advanced fire-control radar to assist in pin-pointing the location of enemy aircraft to be shot down whilst the Weapon Fire Unit (WFU) version lacks the centrally mounted radar but can be cued and directed by the fire-control radar of the former. This Singapore-modified version of the M113 is fielded by the Republic of Singapore Air Force (RSAF) for use in ground-based air defence.
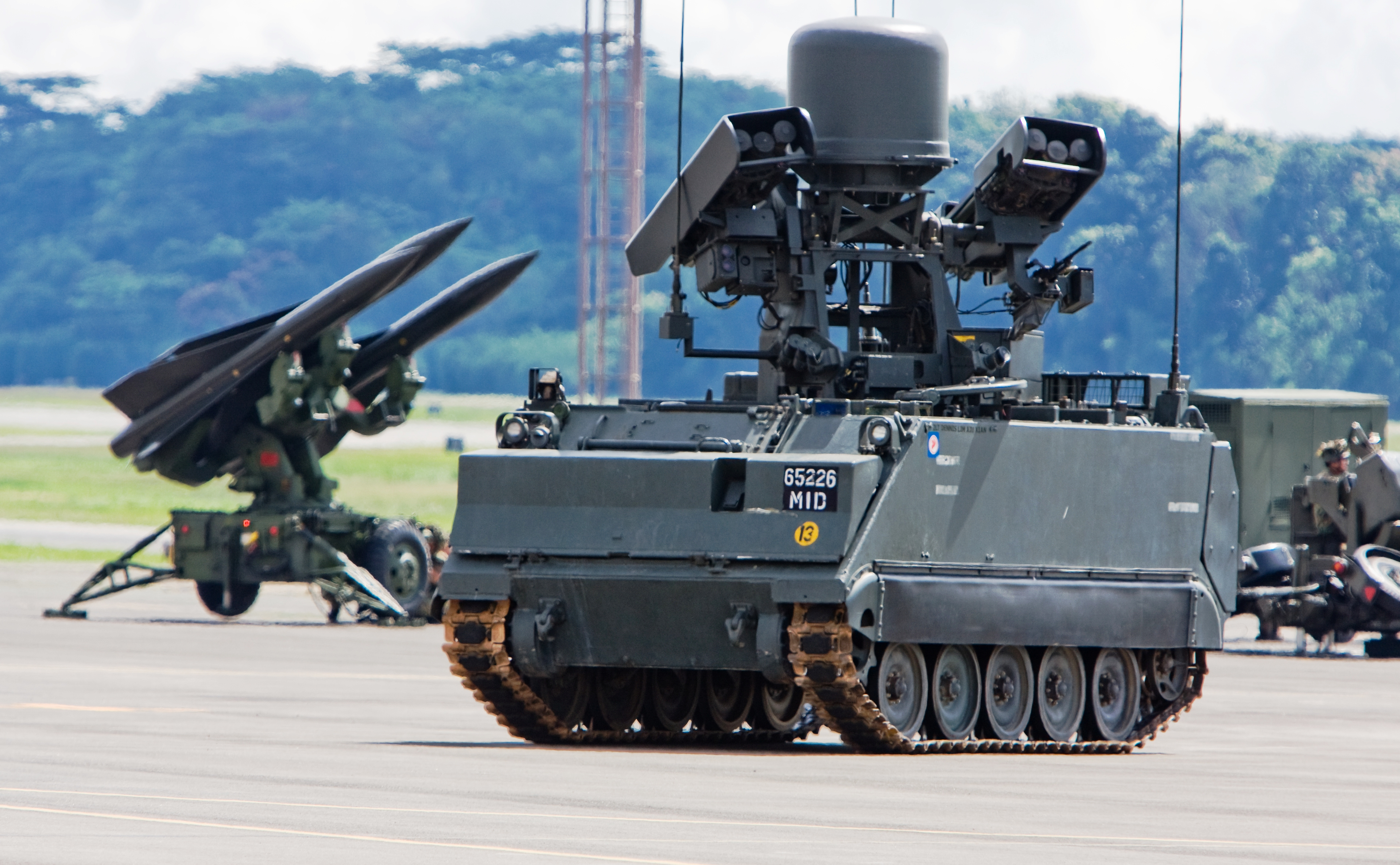
The M113A2 Ultra Mechanised Igla Integrated Fire Unit (IFU)

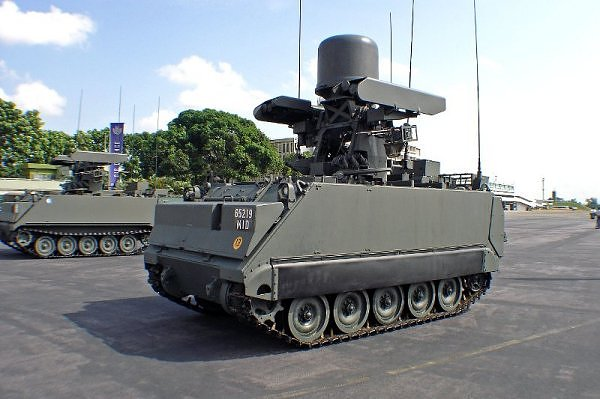
The RSAF's M113A2 Ultra Mechanised Igla IFU. Note the mast-mounted cylindrical-shaped fire-control radar.

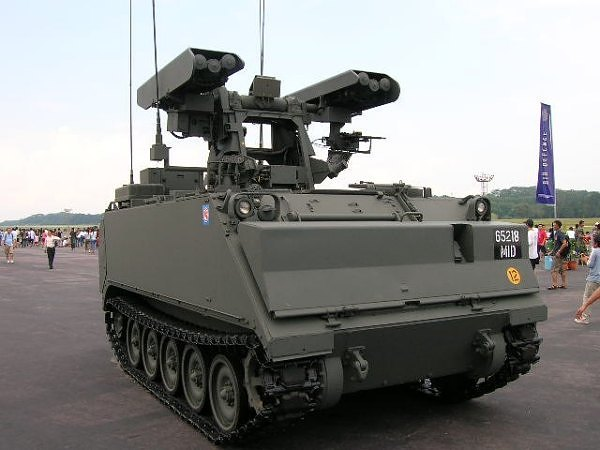
The RSAF's M113A2 Ultra Mechanised Igla Weapon Fire Unit (WFU)

=== South Vietnam ===
- M113 w/ M8 turret – The Army of the Republic of Vietnam (ARVN; South Vietnamese Army) fitted a small number of M113 armored personnel carriers with turrets taken from obsolete M8 Greyhound armored cars.

=== Switzerland ===
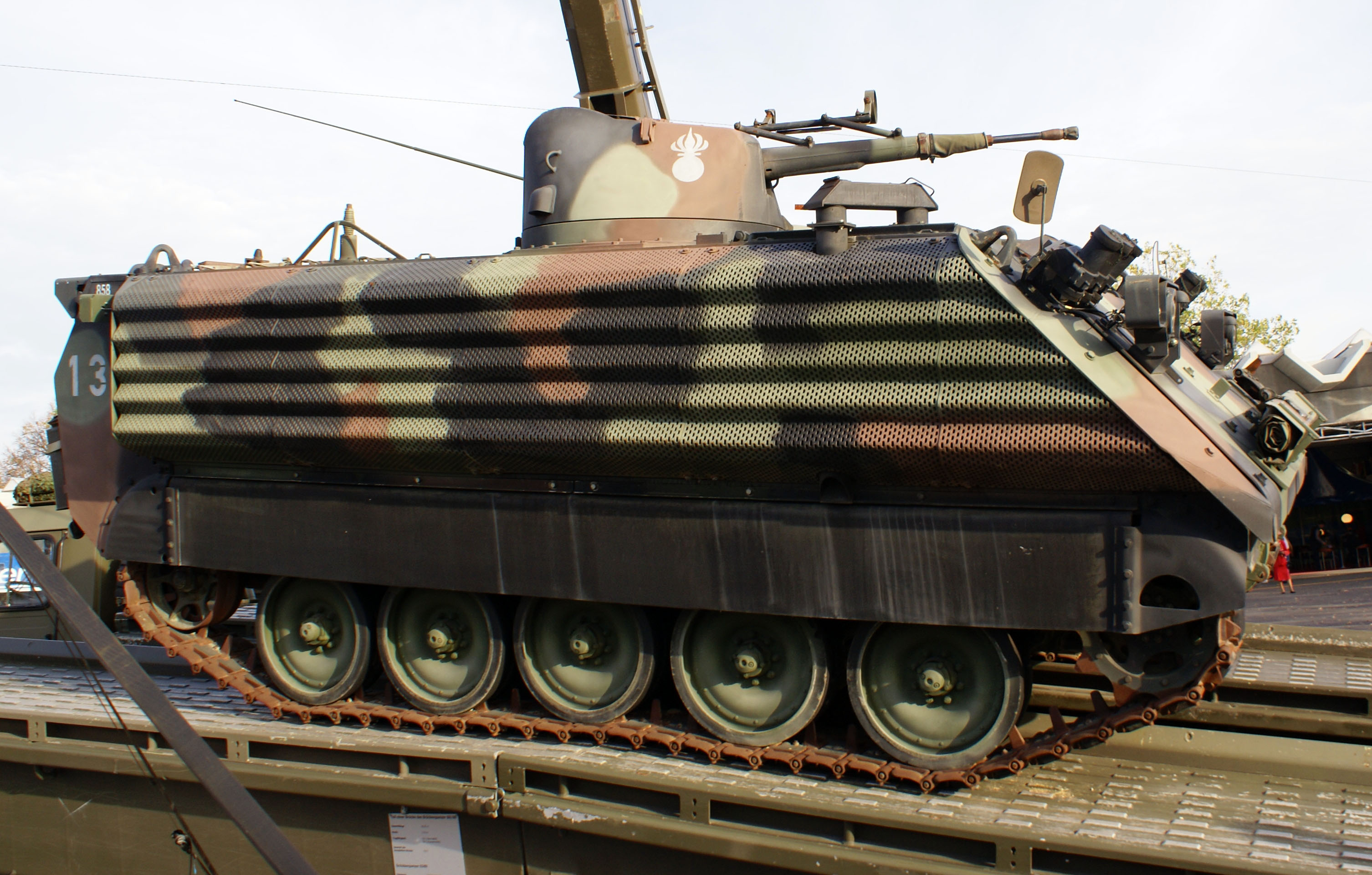
Schützenpanzer 63/89

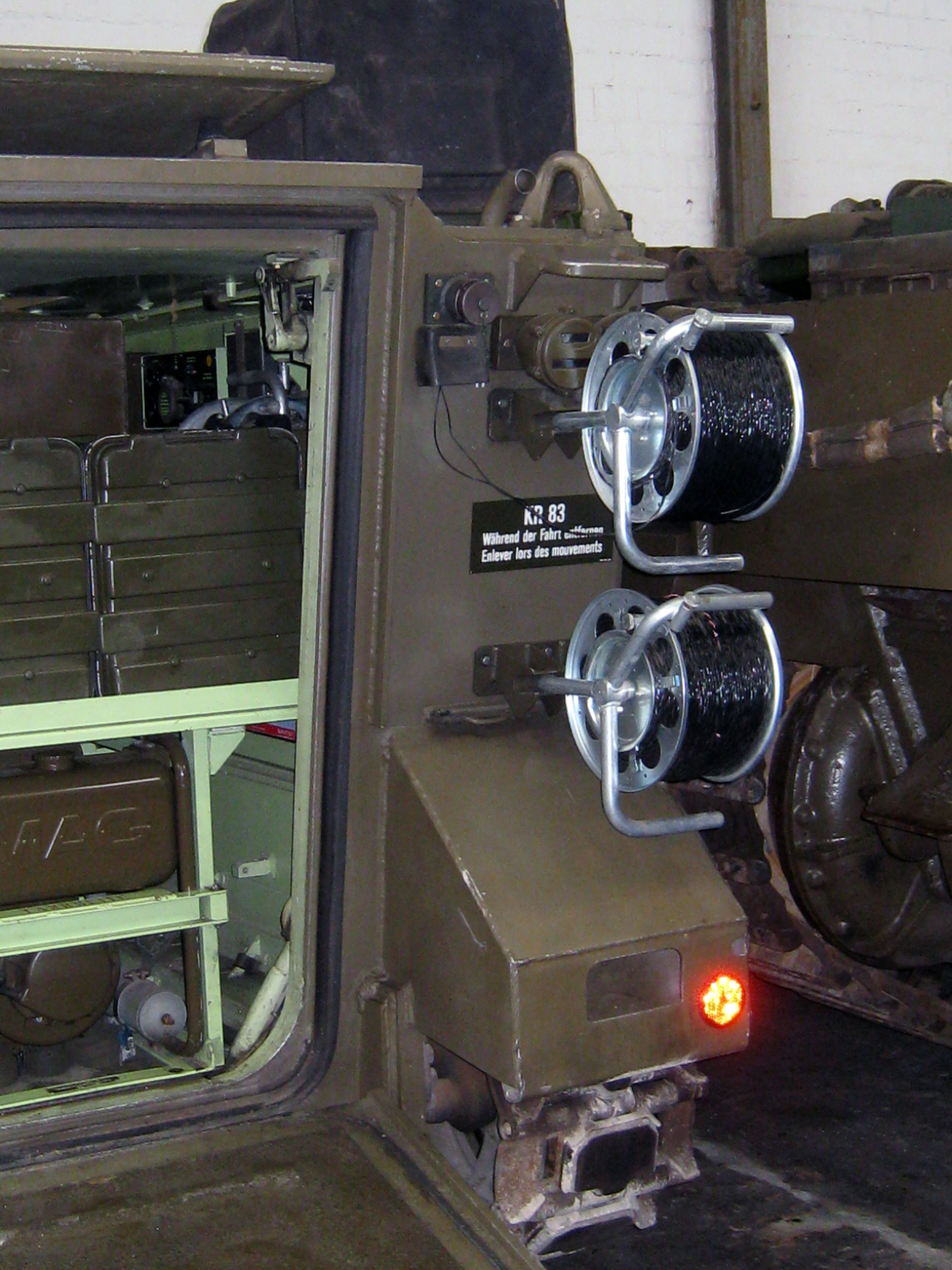
Übermittlungspanzer 63 with telephone wire drums

- Schützenpanzer 63 – Designation of the basic M113A1 in Swiss service.
  - Schützenpanzer 63/73 – Variant of the SPz 63 with a front float panel (found on the M113A2), as well as a Swedish Hagglunds turret fitted with an Oerlikon 20 mm cannon Kan 48/73.
  - Schützenpanzer 63/89 – Upgrade of the SPz 63/73 with additional passive armor, 76mm smoke grenade launchers and RISE power-pack.
- Kommando Schützenpanzer 63 – Command vehicle variant with .50cal machine gun.
  - Kommando Schützenpanzer 63/89 – Command version of the SPz 63/89, which retains the 20 mm gun turret.
- Kranpanzer 63 – Swiss designator for M579.
- Feuerleitpanzer 63 – Improved command vehicle, specifically designed as a fire control center for mobile artillery units.
  - Feuerleitpanzer 63/98 – Upgraded version with INTAFF system (Integriertes Artillerie Führungs- und Feuerleitsystem).
- Geniepanzer 63 – Schützenpanzer 63 fitted with a bulldozer kit.
- Minenwerferpanzer 64 – Swiss variation of the M106A1 mortar carrier, substituting an Eidgenoessische Konstruktionswerkstaette 120 mm mortar for the previously installed weapon. Swiss M106A1's initially had substituted a Thompson Brandt mortar of 81 mm type for the standard 4.2"/107mm M30 mortar found on US models.
  - Minenwerferpanzer 64/91 – Upgraded version.
- Minenräumpanzer 63/00 – Mine-clearing vehicle, based on the SPz 63/89 and fitted with lightweight mine clearing ploughs. The turret was removed and replaced with an armored work station for theoperator.
- Übermittlungspanzer 63 – Signals vehicle.

=== Taiwan ===
- CM-21 – a Taiwanese indigenous design based on the M113, with many improvements and design changes to meet Republic of China Army requirements. The size, shape and performance of the CM-21 is almost identical to the M113, but with different engines and transmissions throughout the years. Various variants produced from 1982 to 2009, over 1000 produced.
  - CM-21/A1 – personnel carrier.
  - CM-22 – mortar carrier for 107 mm/120 mm mortar (similar to M106).
  - CM-23 – mortar carrier for 81 mm mortar (similar to M125).
  - CM-24/A1 – ammo carrier, can carry either 90 rounds of 155 mm or 42 rounds 203 mm
  - CM-25 – TOW launcher.
  - CM-26 – command track (similar to M577)
  - CM-27/A1 – artillery tractor
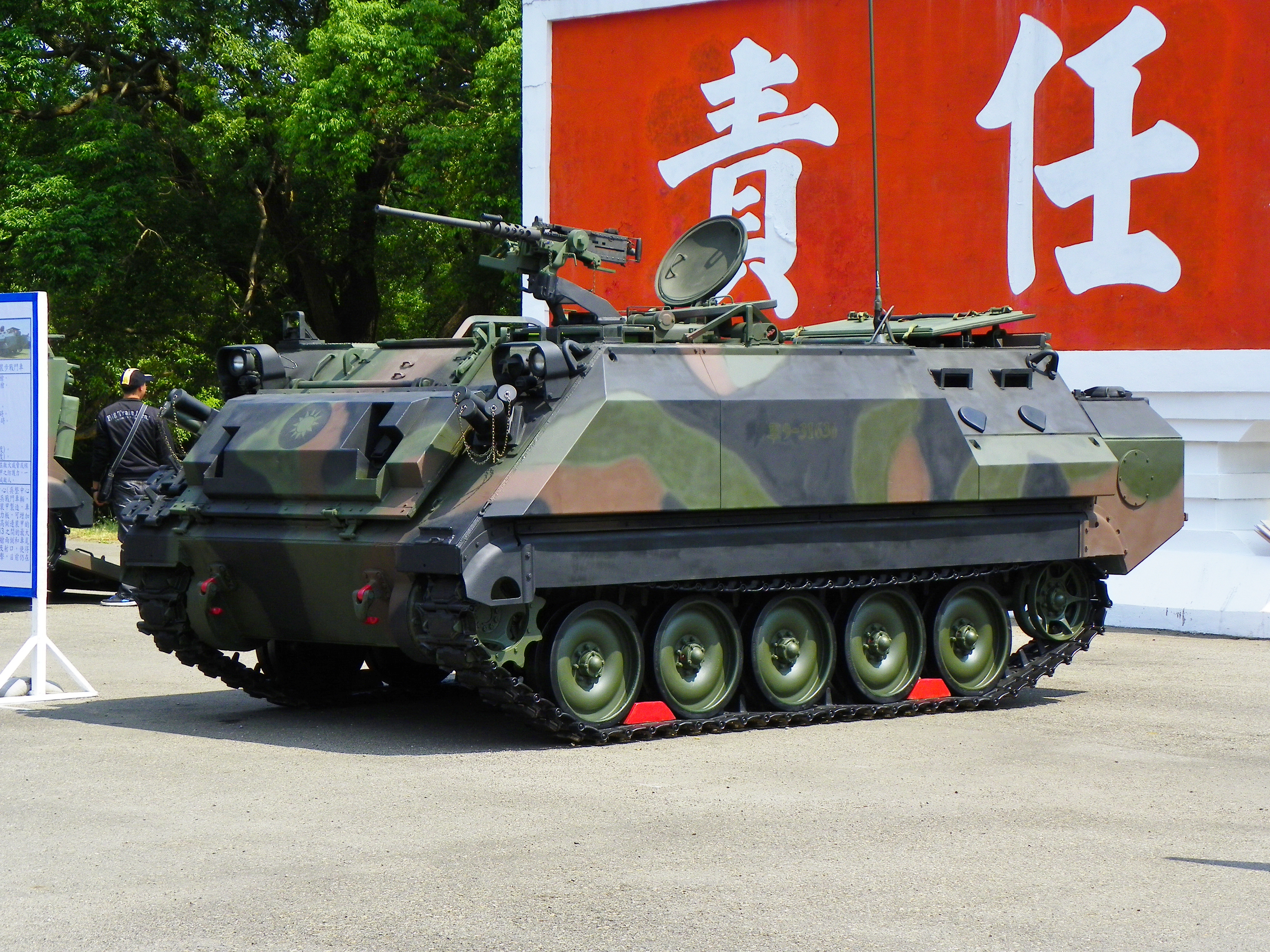
CM-21A armored personnel carrier

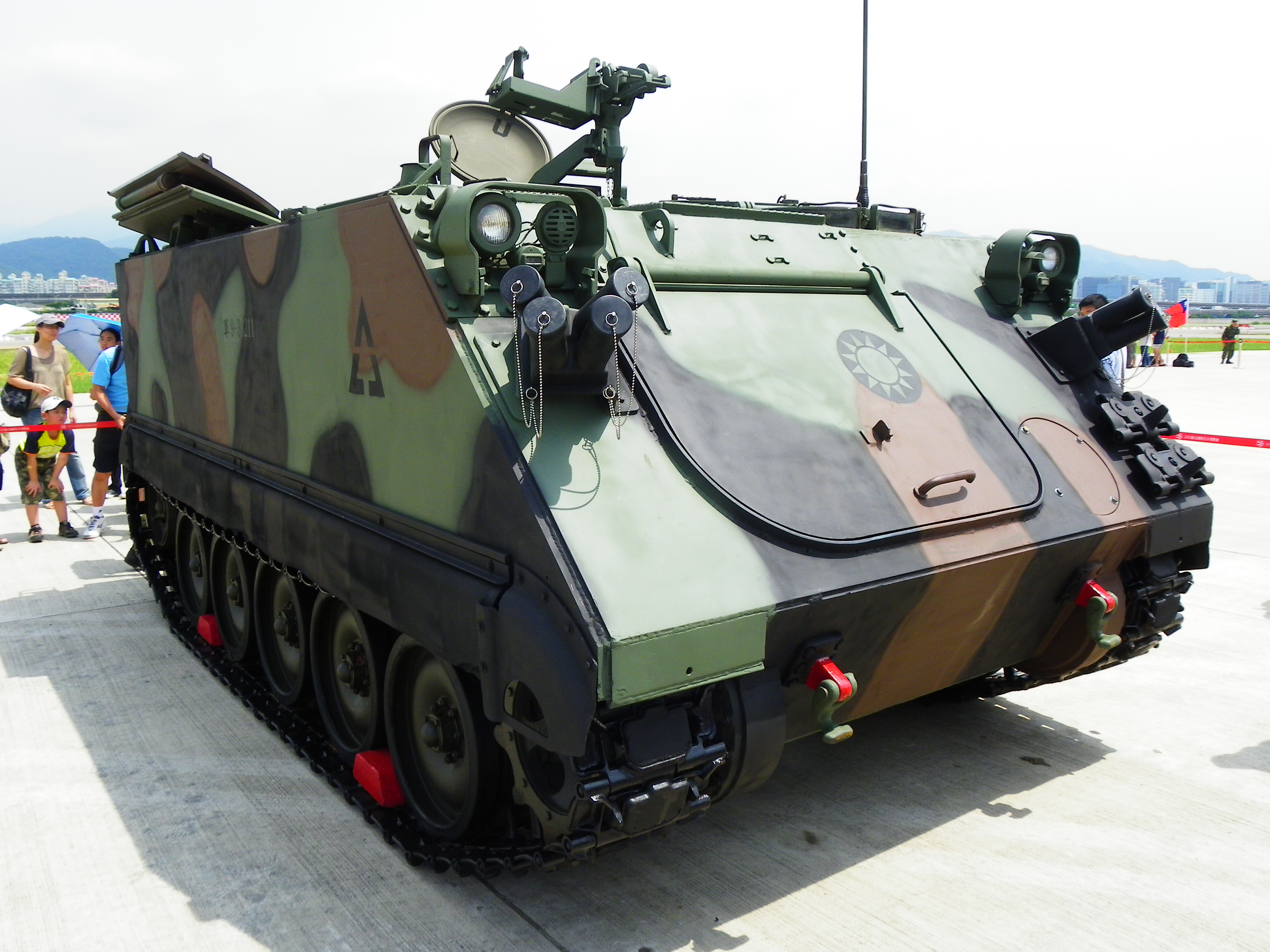
CM-22 mortar carrier

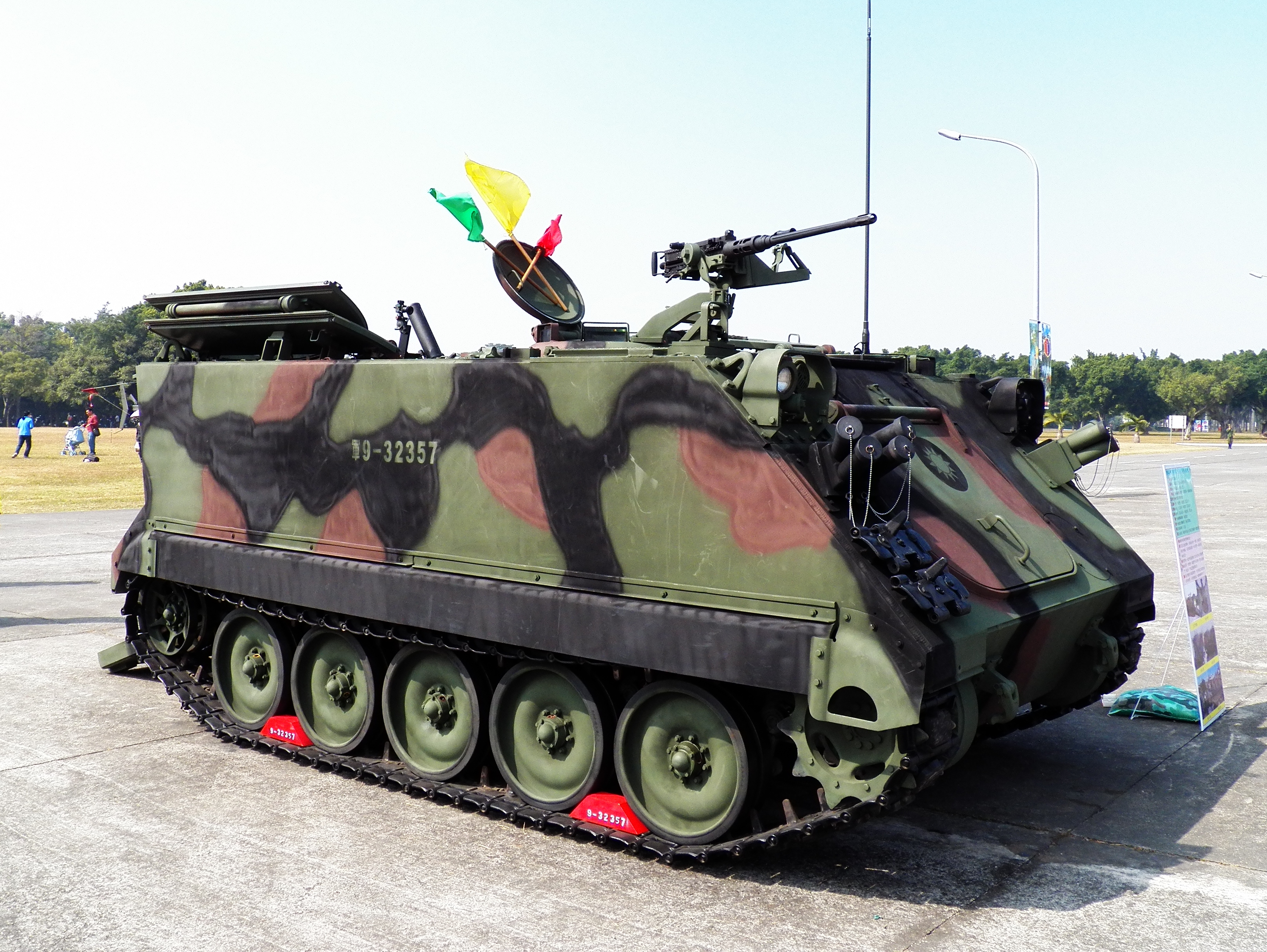
CM-23 mortar carrier

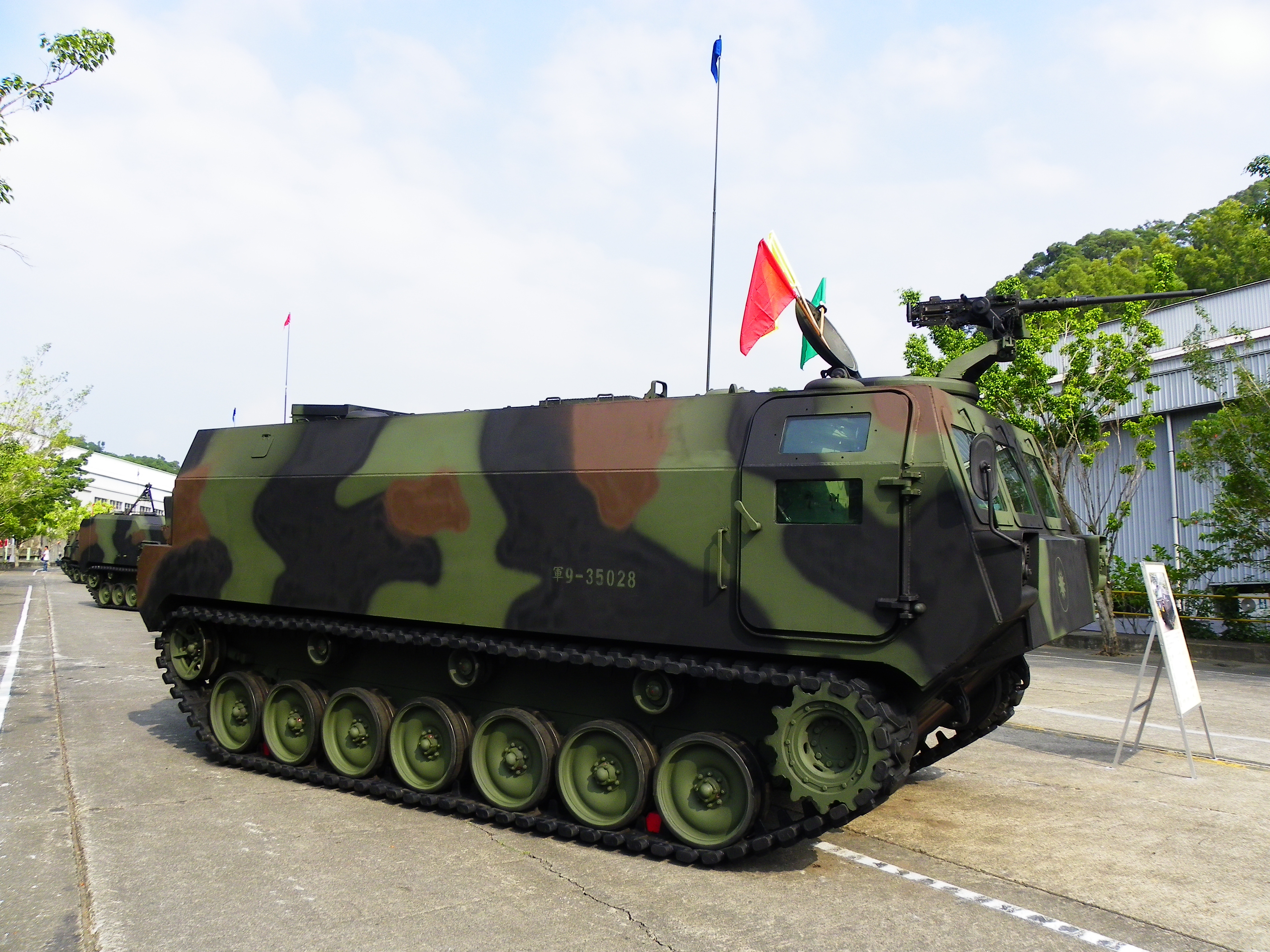
CM-24 ammo carrier

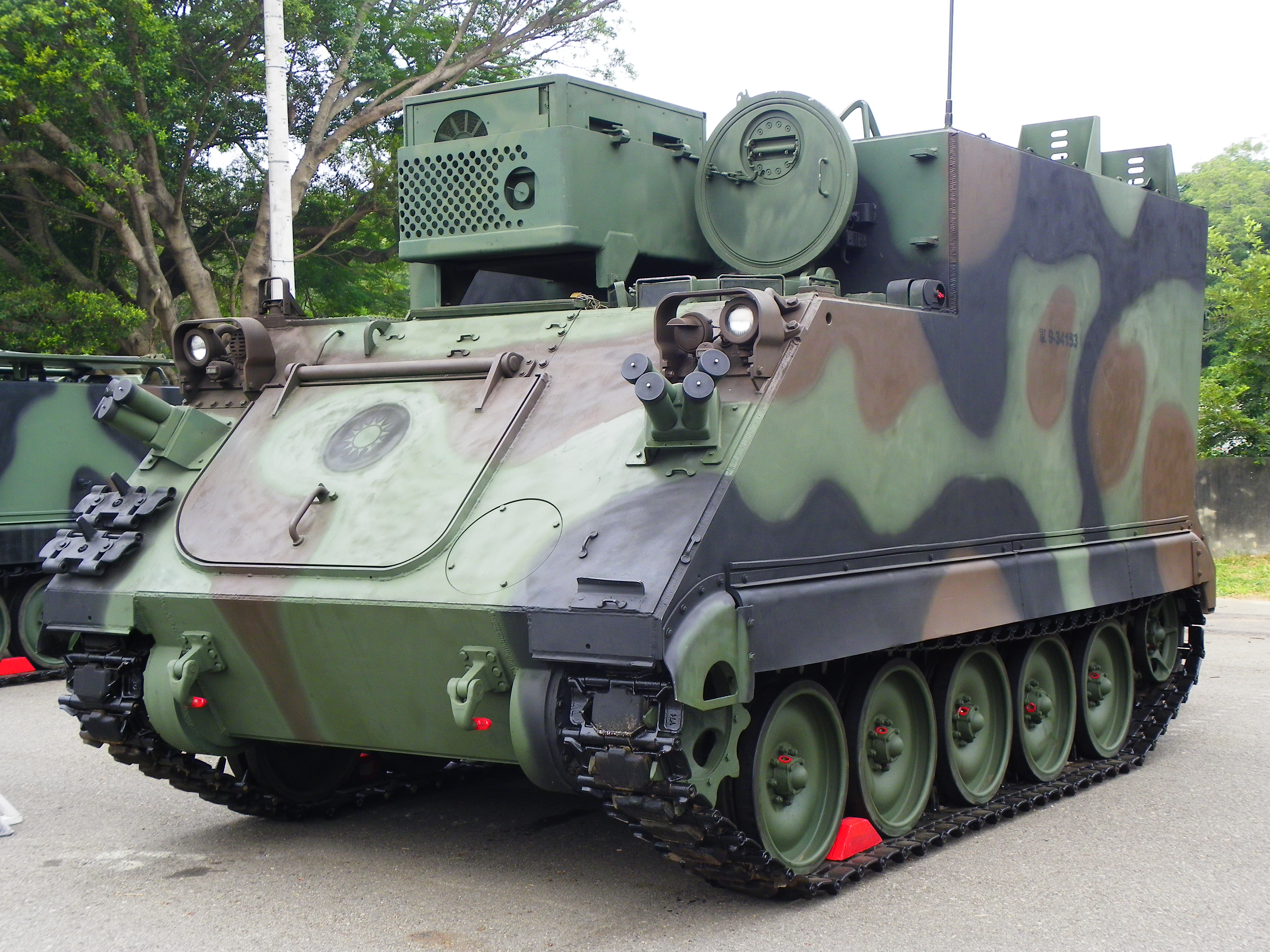
CM-26 armored command post carrier

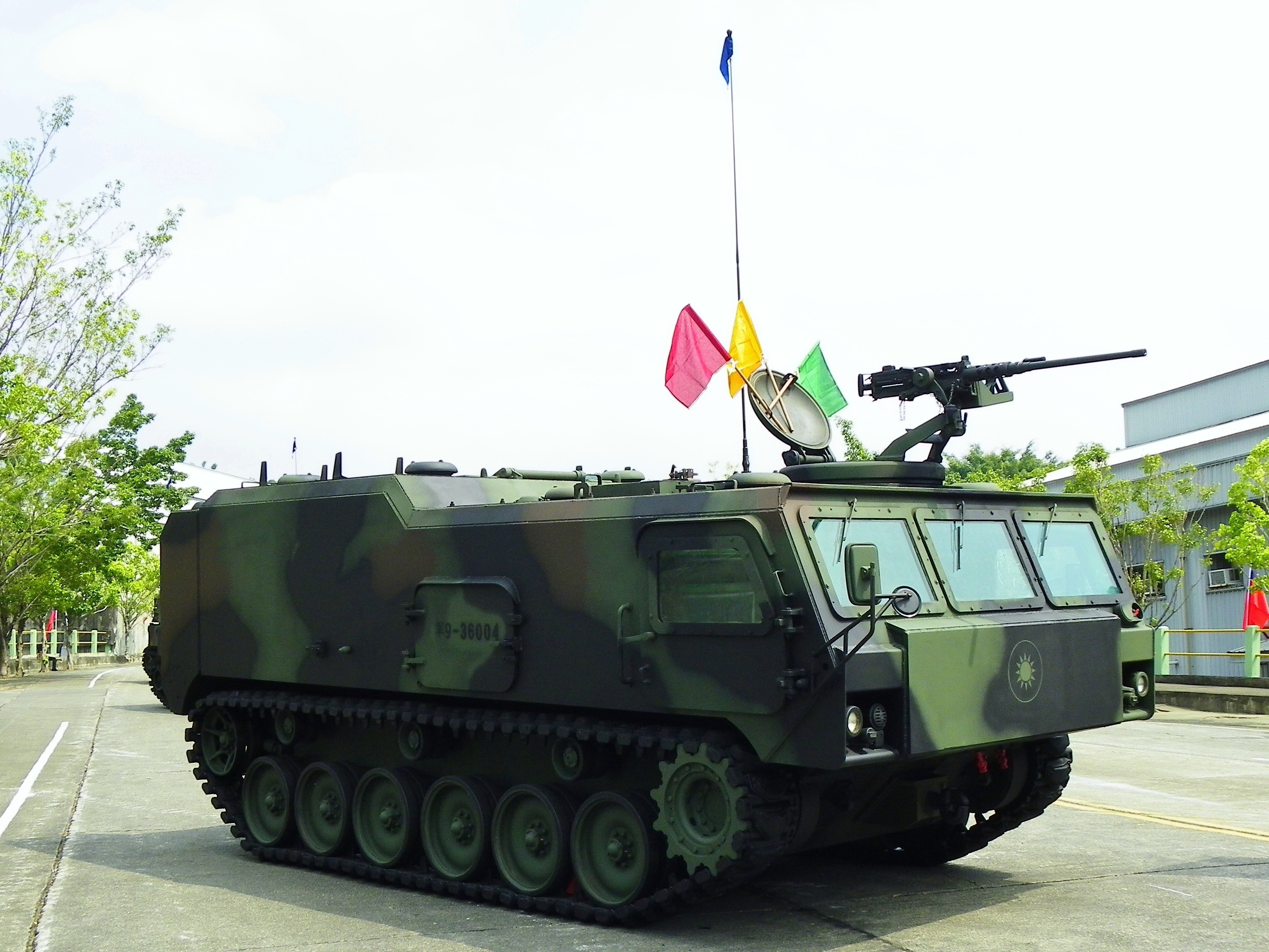
CM-27 artillery tractor

=== Turkey ===
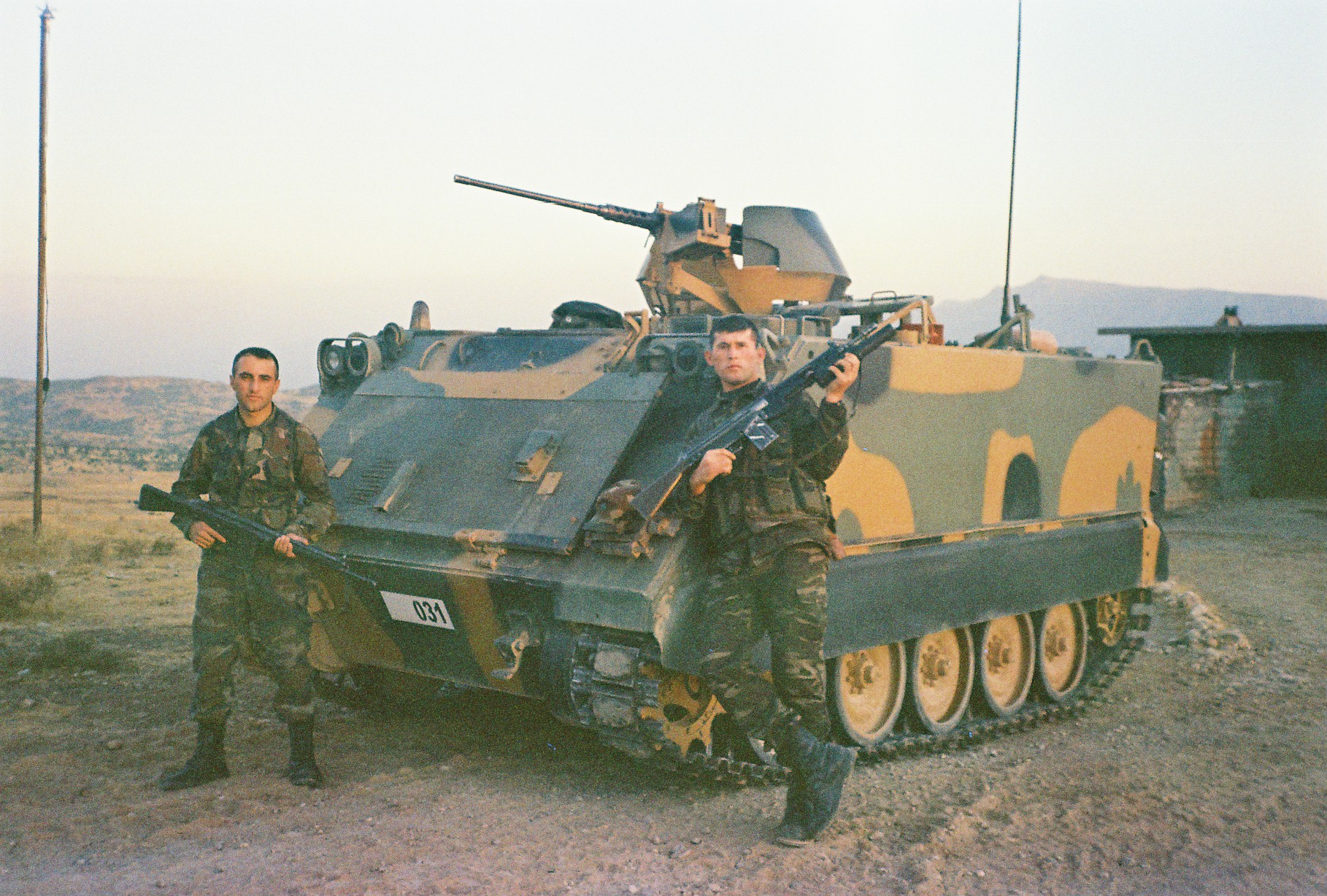
M113A2T2 in 2008

- M113A2T1 – modernized M113A2 with M45 quadmount.
- M113A2T2 – modernized M113A2 with upgraded armor with a M2 Browning cupola turret or BGM-71 TOW.
  - M113A2T2M – medical vehicle variant of T2.
  - ADOP-2000 – forward observer system variant of T2.
  - BAİKS – field artillery battery fire direction variant of T2.
  - Atılgan PMADS – M113A2T2 with a fully automated firing unit for Very Short-Range Air Defence System (VSHORADS) missiles such as the FIM-92 Stinger, providing autonomous as well as coordinated operation with C3I systems and other air defence assets.
- E-ZMA: M113s with hybrid engines and remote control capabilities

=== United Kingdom ===
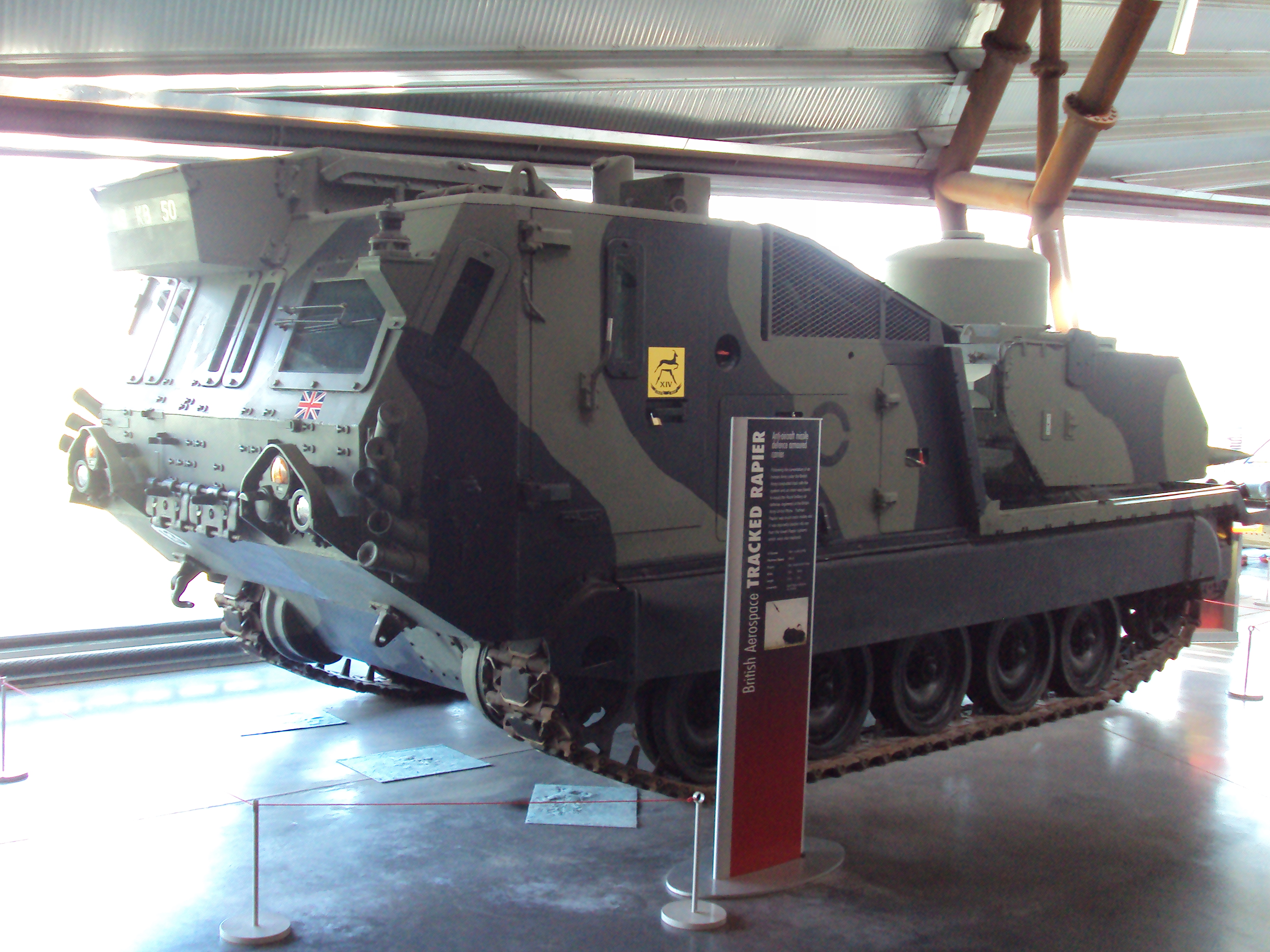
Tracked Rapier at Royal Air Force Museum Midlands.

- XM548/M548 – 6 ton cargo carrier.
- Tracked Rapier – octuple surface-to-air missile launcher for the Rapier missile system originally commissioned by Iran but taken over by the British after the 1979 Revolution. No longer in service.
- M752 – MGM-52 Lance missile carrier/launcher. No longer in service
- M688 – Lance missile transport/loader vehicle based on the M548. No longer in service
- Exactor M113 with Spike NLOS. Supplied from Israel (Hafiz) under a UOR. Replaced with trailer mounted Exactor-2.

=== United States ===
- XM45/E1 – lightly armored servicing and refueling vehicle for the M132 based on the M548.
- M58 – the Wolf smoke generator carrier can produce 90 minutes of visual and 30 minutes of infrared screens.
- XM106/M106 – self-propelled mortar carrier with 107 mm (4.2 inch) M30 mortar firing through large, circular roof hatch in hull rear. Before the US Army changed their designation system, the XM106 was known as the T257E1.
  - M106A1 – M106 with diesel engine.
  - M106A2 – M106A1 with M113A2 improvements.
- M113A4 AMEV – armored medical evacuation vehicle. A specifically modified and equipped M113 for use as an armored ambulance.
- M113 OSV – OPFOR surrogate vehicle (OSV) used to simulate enemy armored personnel carriers in force-on-force training.
- M113 OSV-T – fitted with a mock turret and used to simulate enemy tanks in force-on-force training.
- M113A2 firefighting vehicle – an M113A2 modified to carry a system for dispensing fire suppressant liquid to combat petrochemical fires encountered on the battlefield. Only one prototype was built and the system did not go into production.
- M125 – mortar carrier similar to M106, but with 81 mm M29 mortar.
- M132 armored flamethrower– A full-tracked self-propelled flame thrower carrier, with small turret carrying an M10-8 flamethrower and coaxial M73 machine gun, plus fuel and pressure tanks in rear of hull.
  - M132A1 – modified M113A1s rather than M113s.
- M163 – the Vulcan Air Defense System (VADS) is an M168 anti-aircraft gun mounted on the M741 carrier.
- M474 – carrier used as Pershing 1 nuclear missile Transporter erector launcher (TEL) and as Warhead Carrier, Programmer Test Station/Power Station carrier and Radio Terminal Set carrier.
- XM546 – guided missile carrier/launcher for the MIM-46 Mauler surface-to-air missile.
  - XM546E1 – proposed version with a lengthened chassis featuring a sixth set of road-wheels.
- XM548/M548 – unarmored 6 ton cargo carrier.
  - XM548E1 – unarmored carrier/launcher for the MIM-72 Chaparral surface-to-air missiles of the M54 system. Redesignated XM730.
- M577 – this variant is used as a command vehicle, generally as a tactical operations center (TOC). The passenger compartment is raised to 74.75 in (189.9 cm). The compartment has a commander's hatch with no weapons mount or vision blocks. A tent is carried on the top rear and attaches directly to the rear of the track to provide greater work space. Multiple M577s can be connected via the tents to form a larger operations center. An additional fuel tank is mounted in the right rear of the compartment. Long-range communications is expedited by the use of a hand-cranked extendible antenna system. A 4.2 kW auxiliary power unit (APU) is mounted on the right front of the vehicle to provide 24 volt power. The APU can be dismounted using a davit (crane) carried on board and sandbagged for noise suppression. A single APU can provide power for two M577s. The compartment includes features such as map boards, folding tables, radio, computer terminals and other command and control equipment. This variant is also used as a medical vehicle serving as a battalion aid station ambulance exchange point and a jump aid station.
- M579 Fitter – repair vehicle.
- M667 – MGM-52 Lance missile carrier.
- M688 – Lance missile transport/loader vehicle based on the M548.
- XM696 – recovery vehicle based on the M548.
- M727 – unarmored carrier/launcher for the MIM-23 Hawk surface-to-air missiles.
- XM730/M730 – unarmored carrier/launcher for the MIM-72 Chaparral surface-to-air missiles of the M54 system. The XM730 was formerly the XM548E1. The complete system is known as the M48.
  - M730A1 – M730 with M113A2 improvements.
  - M730A2 – M730/A1 with M113A3 Reliability Improvement of Standard Components (RISE) upgrades.
- XM734 – mechanized infantry combat vehicle (MICV) prototype. Variant of the standard M113A1 APC with four firing ports and vision blocks on each side of the hull.
- XM741/M741 – carrier vehicle for the M163 Vulcan Air Defense System (VADS).
- M752 – MGM-52 Lance missile launcher. M667 with Lance launch fixture.
- XM806/XM806E1 – armored recovery vehicle variant with winch in rear compartment.
- M901 improved TOW vehicle (ITV) – M113A1 with dual M220A1 launchers for the TOW anti-tank missile.
  - M901A1 – M220A2 launcher permitting the use of the TOW 2 anti-tank missile.
  - M901A2 – variant with unknown differences, possibly M901s brought up to M901A1 standard or M901/A1s on the M113A2 chassis.
  - M901A3 – variant based on M113A3.
- M981 Fire Support Team Vehicle (FISTV) – artillery forward observer vehicle. Equipped with sights and other targeting instrumentation in a turret deliberately designed to resemble that of the M901. The M981 FISTV has been supplanted by the M7 Bradley and M1131 Stryker fire support vehicles.
- M1015 tracked electronic warfare carrier
- M1059 – Lynx smoke generator carrier (SGC). Uses the M157 smoke generator set (SGS) on the M113A2.
  - M1059A3 – M1059 variant using the M157A2 SGS on the M113A3.
- M1064 mortar carrier – equipped with an M121 120 mm mortar as replacement for M106.
- M1068 standard integrated command post system carrier – a modification of the M577 command post carrier.
- XM1108 universal carrier – a stretched M113A3 chassis with 6 roadwheels per side. Uses a cab from a M270 MLRS. Could be fitted with different weapons and equipment. Never fielded.
- M113-1/2 command and reconnaissance (Lynx) – smaller command and reconnaissance vehicle built by FMC using M113A1 components, with four drive wheels on each side and the engine in the rear. Lost out in US competition to the M114, but was employed by the Netherlands and Canada (where it was known as the Lynx).
- T249 Vigilante – prototype 37 mm self-propelled anti-aircraft gun that never entered service.
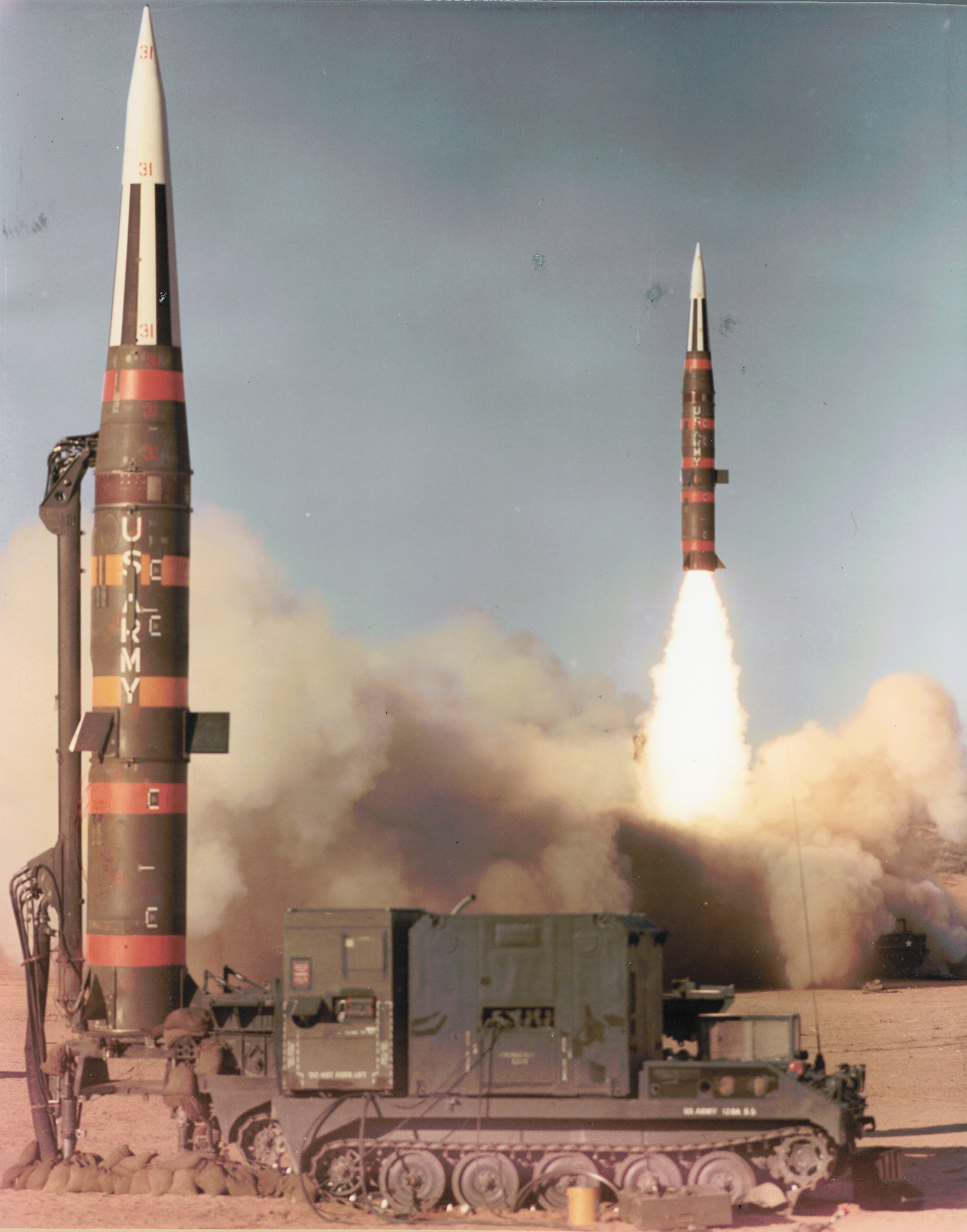
M474 TEL background, PTS/PS carrier in foreground

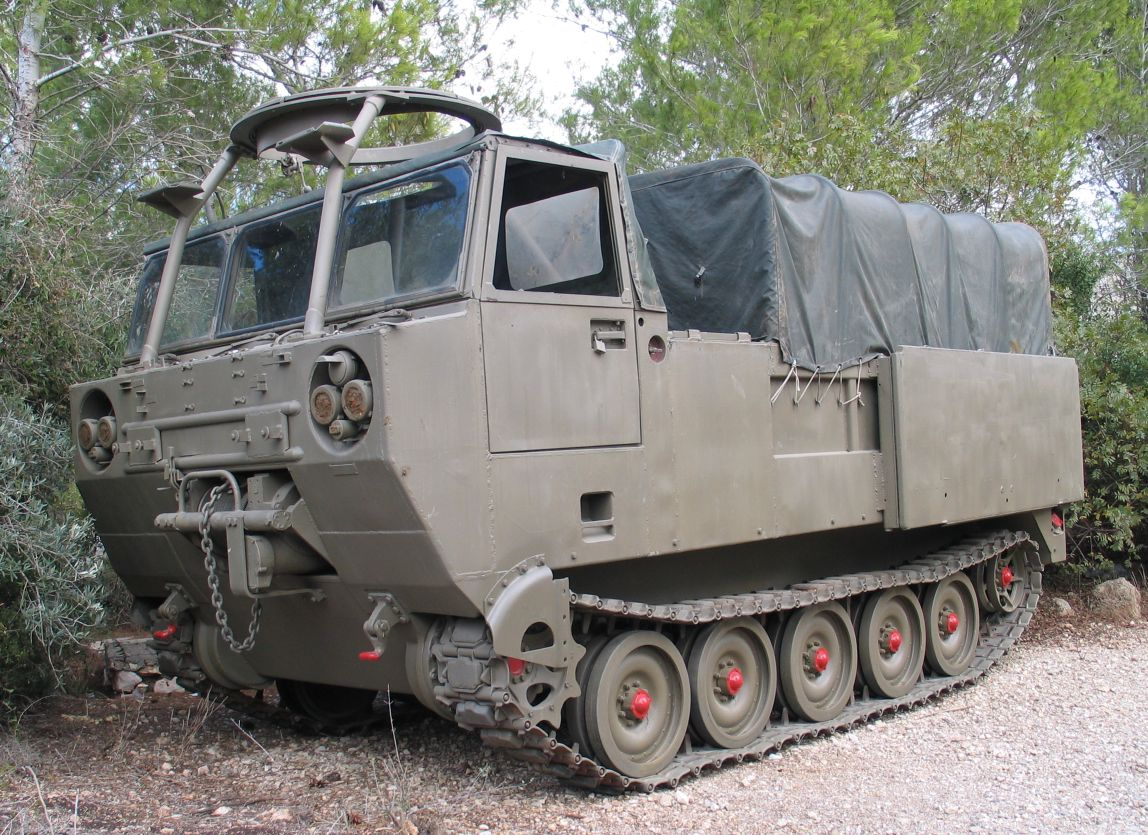
M548 cargo carrier

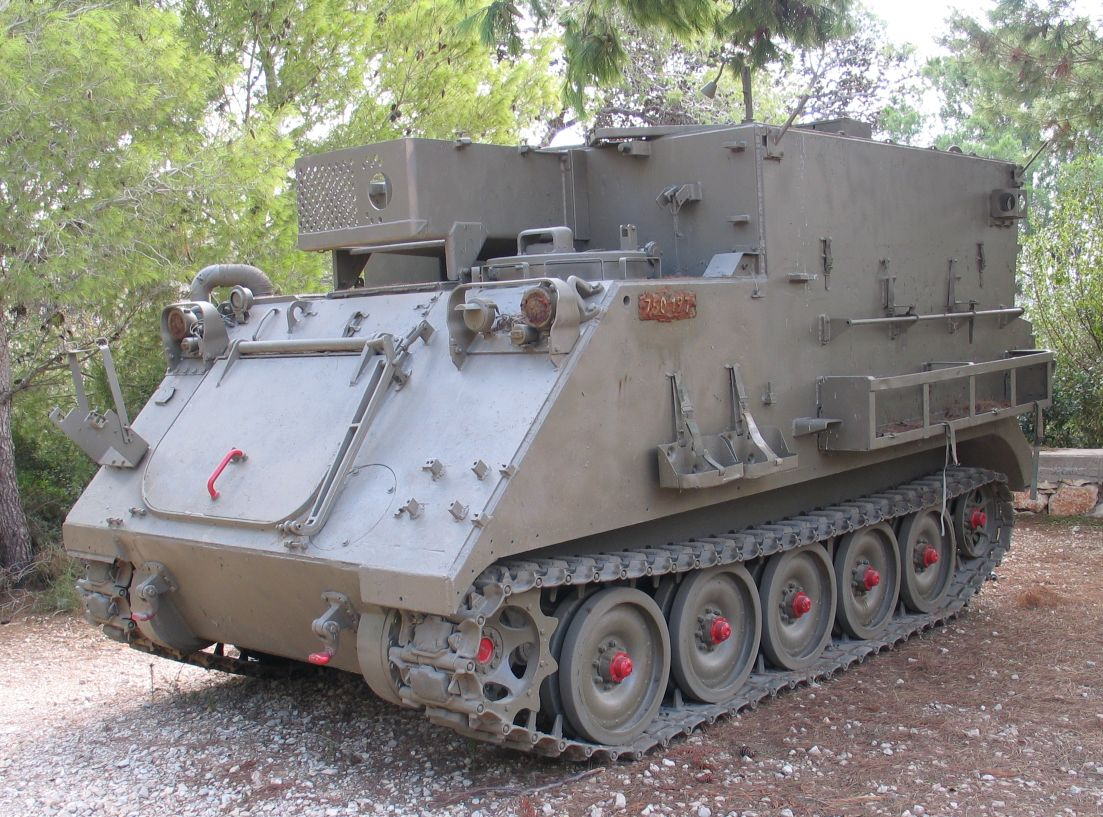
M577 command vehicle

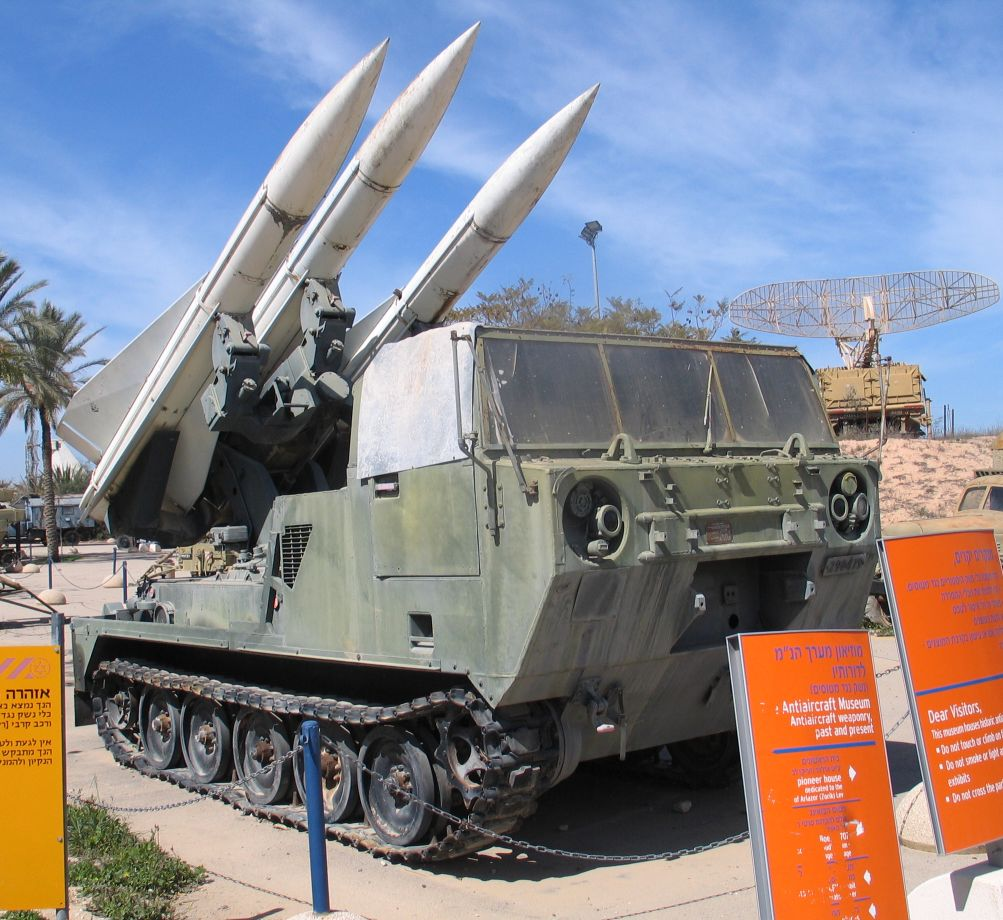
M727 missile carrier launcher

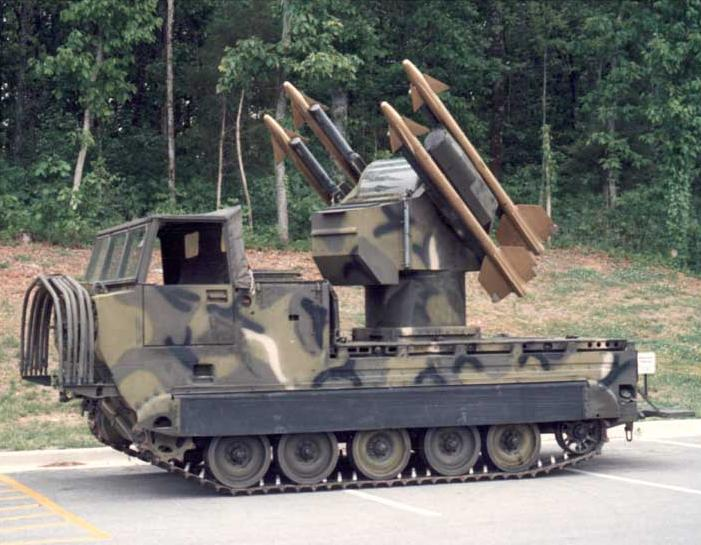
M730 SAM carrier

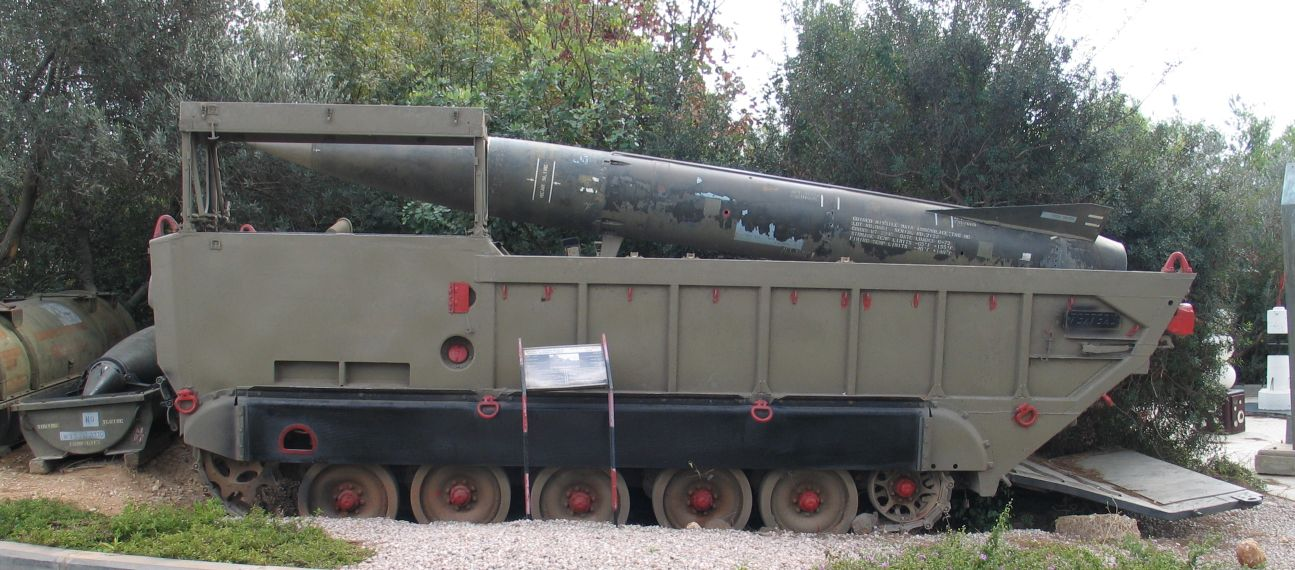
M752 missile launcher

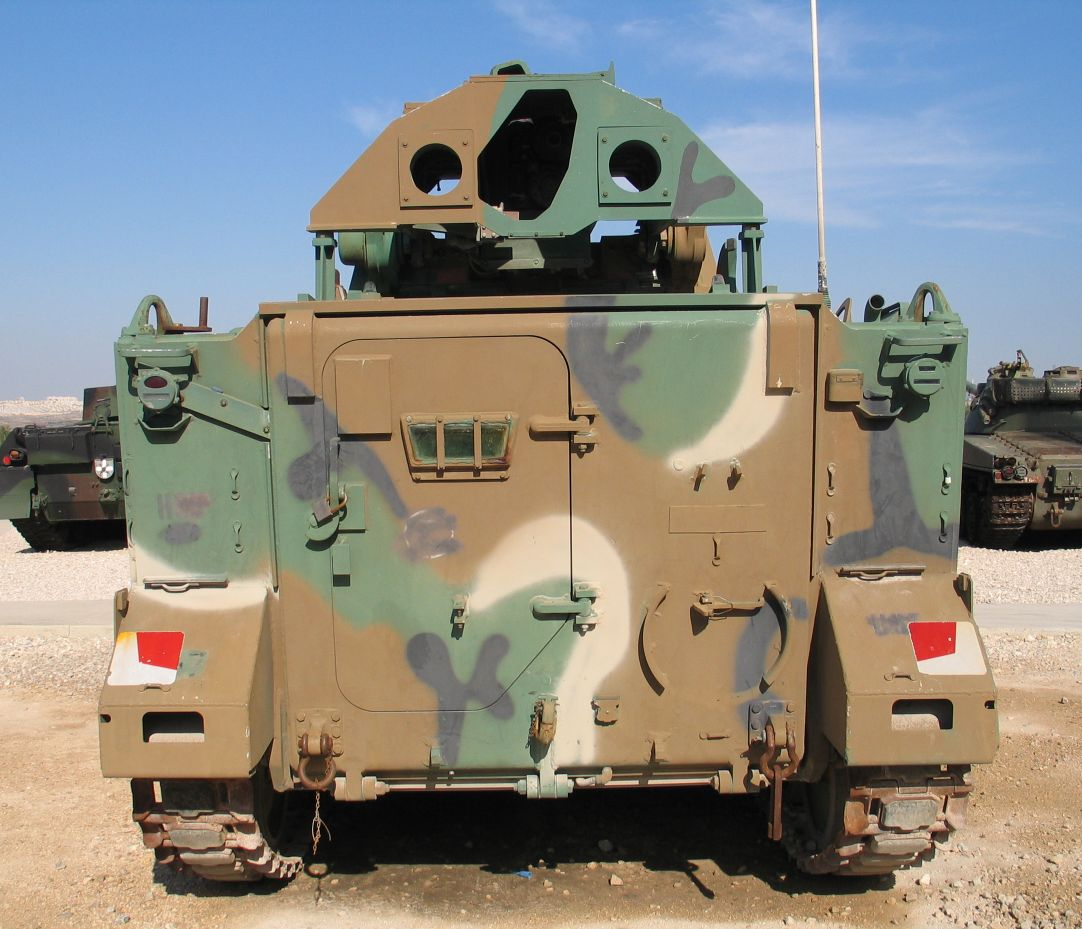
M901 ITV.

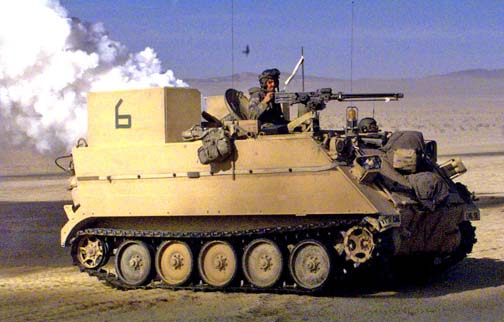
M1059 smoke generator carrier

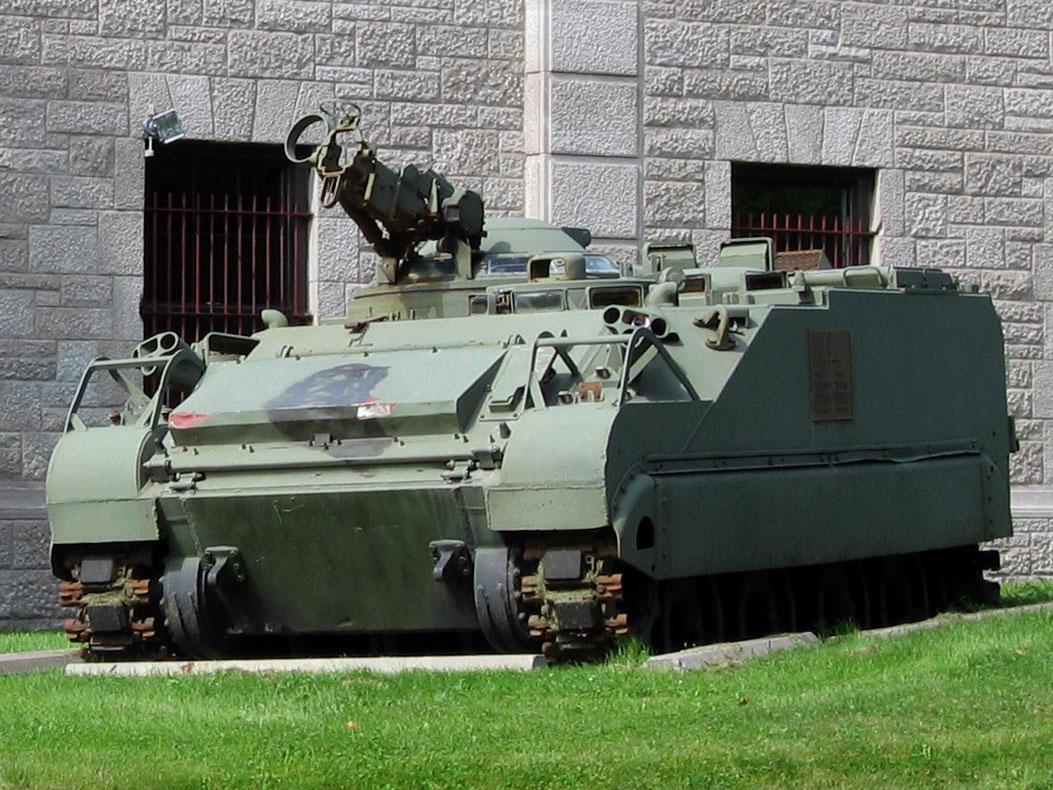
Canadian Lynx reconnaissance vehicle

=== Vietnam ===
- M113 w/ SPG-9 and DShK heavy machine gun -replacing the M2 Browning and the 106mm recoilless rifle to boost self-sufficiency.
- M113 hull number 049 -Vietnamese prototype upgrade of the M113 , modifed with add-on passive armor plating on both of the sides, extended side skirts to shield the upper part of the tracks. As well as an enclosed armored, unmanned turret to control a NSV machine gun remote weapon system.
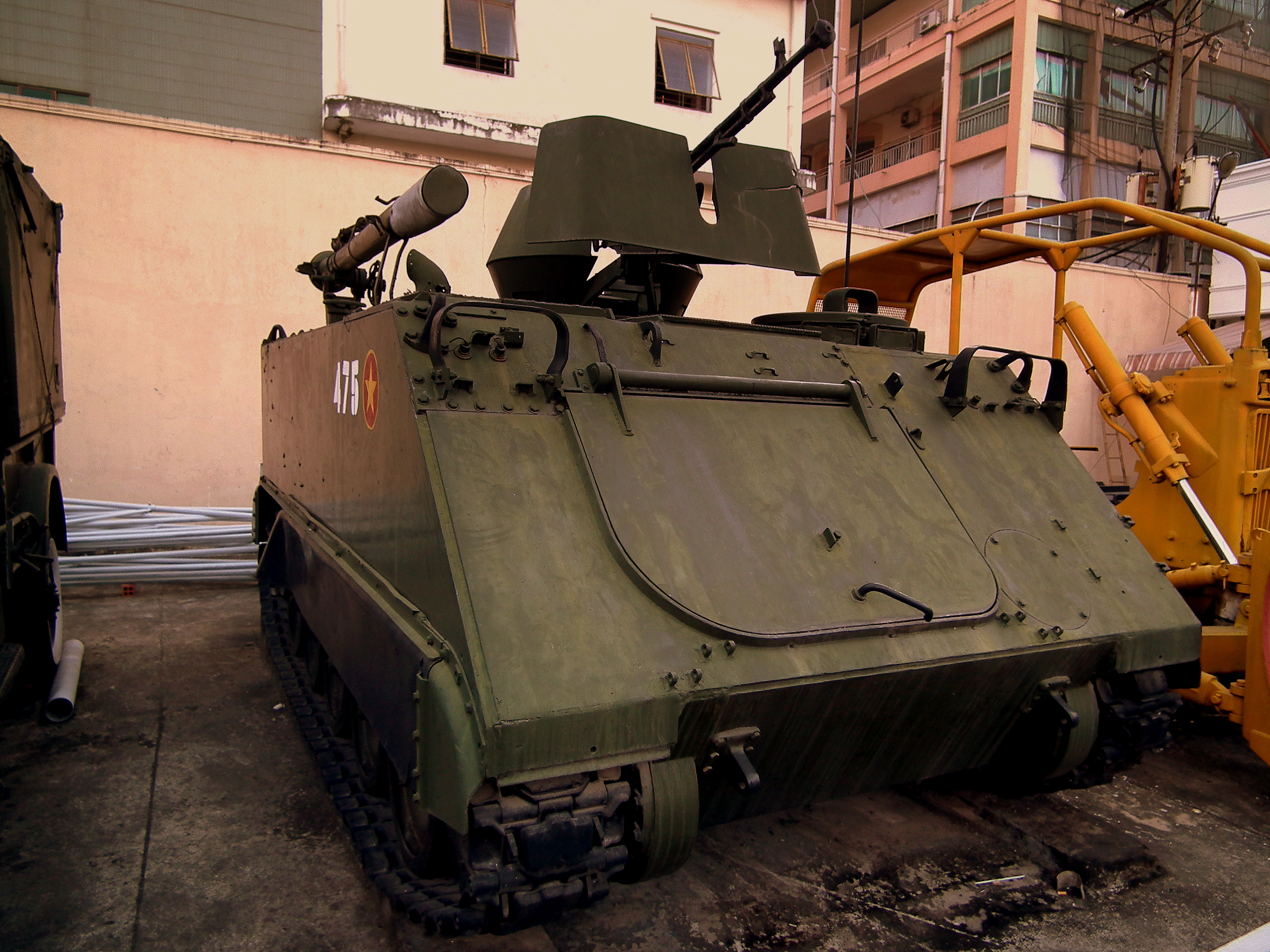
M113 w/ SPG-9 and DShK heavy machine gun

=== Log Skidder ===
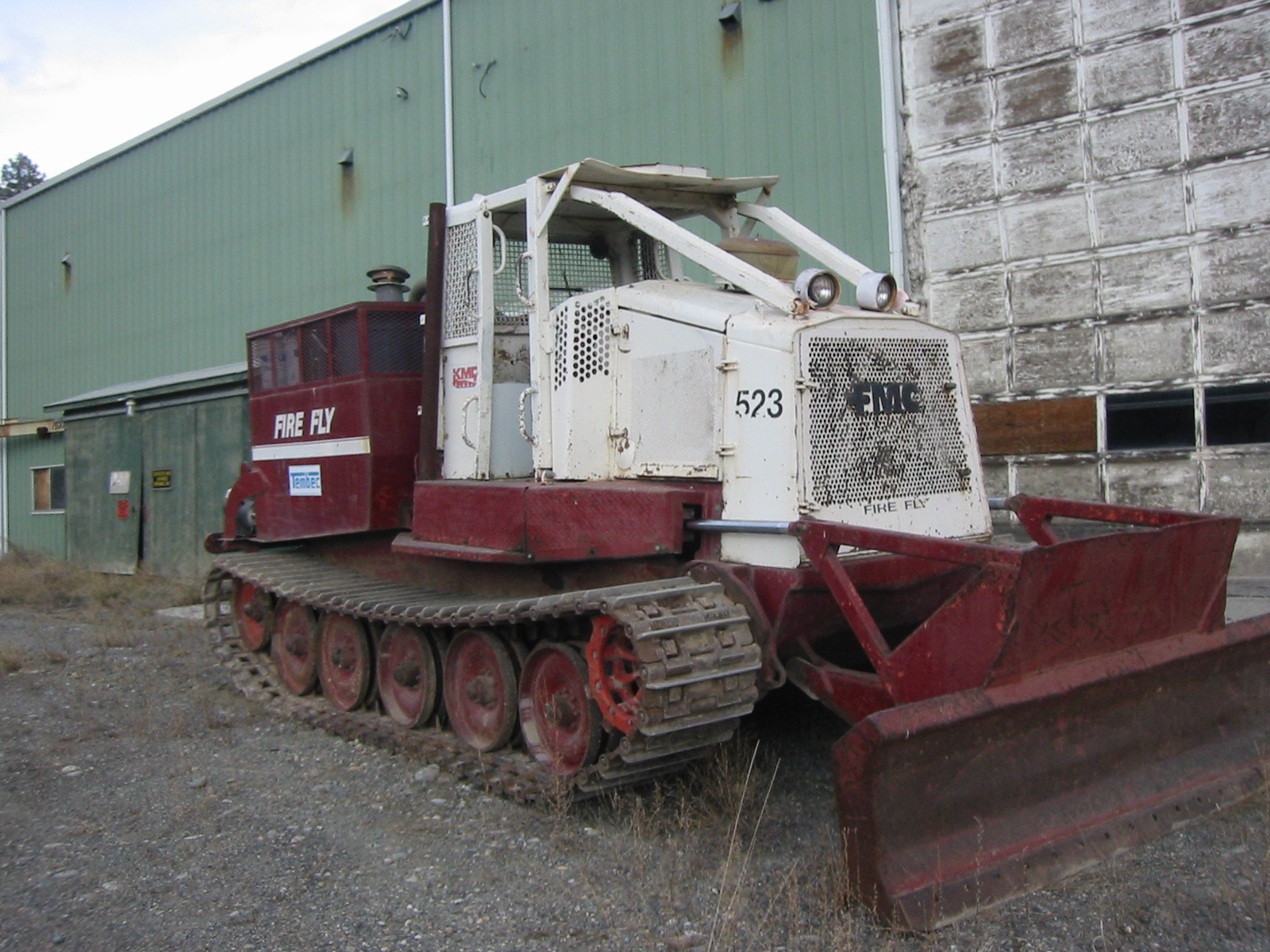
An FMC 210CA skidder modified for forest fires

In 1974, FMC used the M113's drivetrain as a platform for a tracked log skidder.

The skidders use the same 6V53 Detroit Diesel engine and steering gearbox as the M113, but utilized a more heavily built undercarriage and a 4-speed Clark powershift transmission. The skidder either came as a cable arch model, with a tilting tray to set the logs on (a hydraulic grapple attachment was later offered to fit over the cable fairleads), or as a Clam-Bunk forwarder, with a Prentice grapple mounted on the roof of the cab. Dealers also modified the base tractor to handle various forestry and utility jobs.

Because of their mobility and light weight, these skidders are often used in steep and swampy terrain, and the most common alternate use is to fit them with water tanks and use them to fight forest fires.

In 1988, FMC sold the manufacturing rights of the skidder to Kootenay Tractor, their main dealer in British Columbia, Canada, who is selling them under the KMC brand name.

Newer skidder models use Cummins diesel engines, and offer the option of hydrostatic drive alongside the mechanical steering.

=== NASA Armored Rescue Vehicle ===
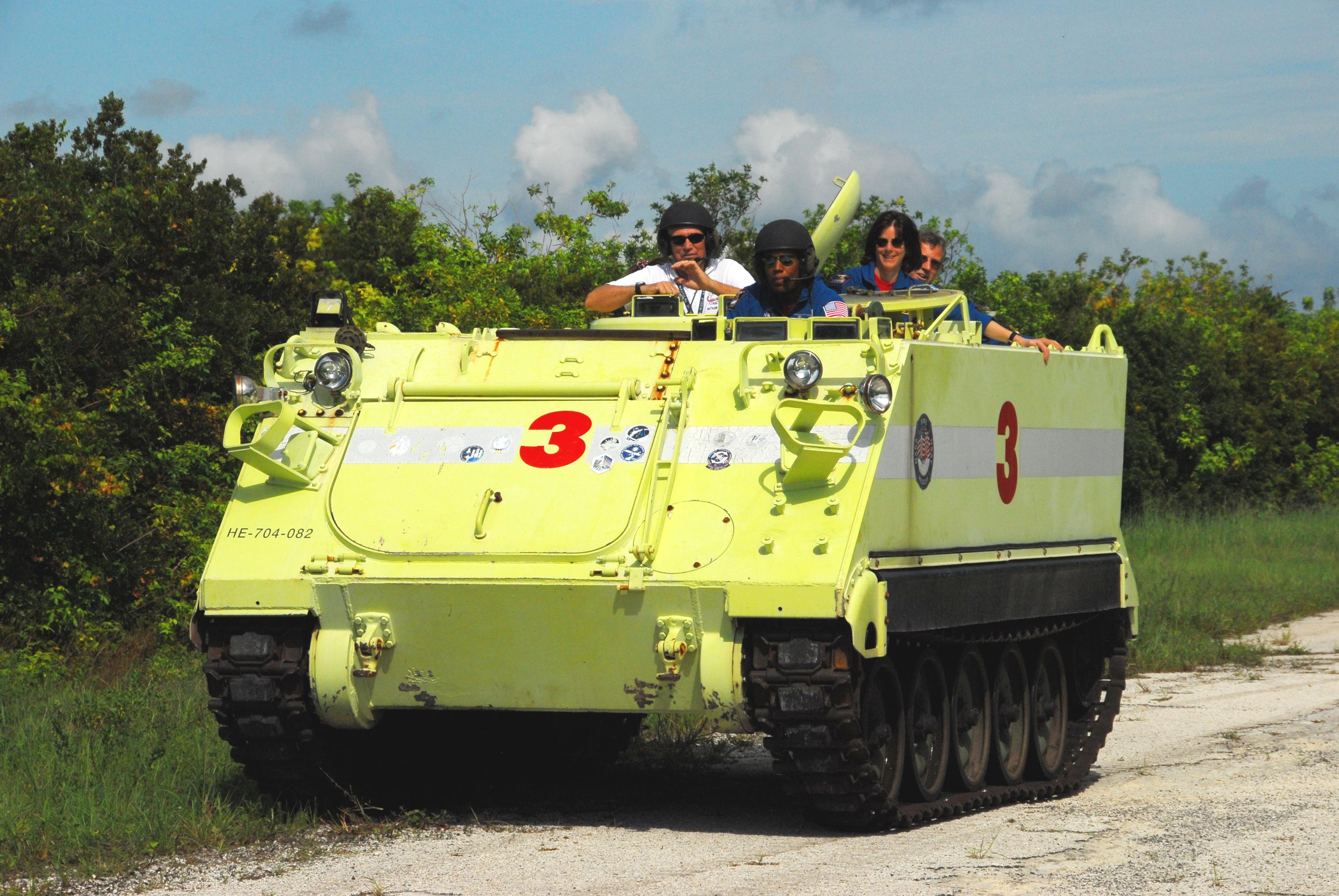
Space Shuttle crew training in a M113 Armoured Rescue Vehicle

From the early 1960s through to 2013 NASA operated a number of ex-United States Army M113s as armoured rescue vehicles. The vehicles, numbered 1 to 4, were originally painted white with large red numbers but were later repainted luminous yellow-green with a reflective silver stripe along the side interrupted by the vehicle number in red.

Located at the Kennedy Space Center (KSC) and operated by the KSC Fire Department, for every crewed spacecraft launch during Mercury, Gemini and Apollo programs two vehicles containing firefighters and emergency rescue personnel wearing fire-proof suits were located approximately one mile from the foot of the launchpad. For the Space Shuttle program a further unmanned vehicle was parked outside the exit of the crew evacuation bunker for use by the spacecraft crew as an emergency evacuation vehicle. As part of their mission training, the Shuttle astronauts were taught to drive and operate the vehicles (usually units 3 and 4), and each crew would affix their respective mission patch upon the vehicle's exterior.

NASA's M113s were replaced in 2013 by more modern – and roomier – Caiman Mine Resistant Ambush Protected (MRAP) trucks.

=== Firefighting vehicles ===
M113s and variants such as the M548 are used by various fire departments and private companies around the world as firefighting vehicles, often employed to combat forest fires where terrain makes access for regular firefighting appliances difficult.

In 2017 MythBusters star Jamie Hyneman created the 'Sentry', a prototype firefighting vehicle from a surplus M548A1 Tracked Cargo Carrier. Deluge guns (water cannons) are mounted on the left and right front corners, supplied by two 500 gallon (1900L) water tanks located in the rear cargo tray along with an air compressor and other equipment. The vehicle can be either crewed or remotely operated.

=== Police vehicles ===
M113s and variants such as the M577 are used by various law enforcement agencies around the world (mostly North American), usually by tactical response teams (SWAT) as mobile command posts and siege and hostage rescue vehicles.

US law enforcement agencies known to operate or have operated M113s or variants include:

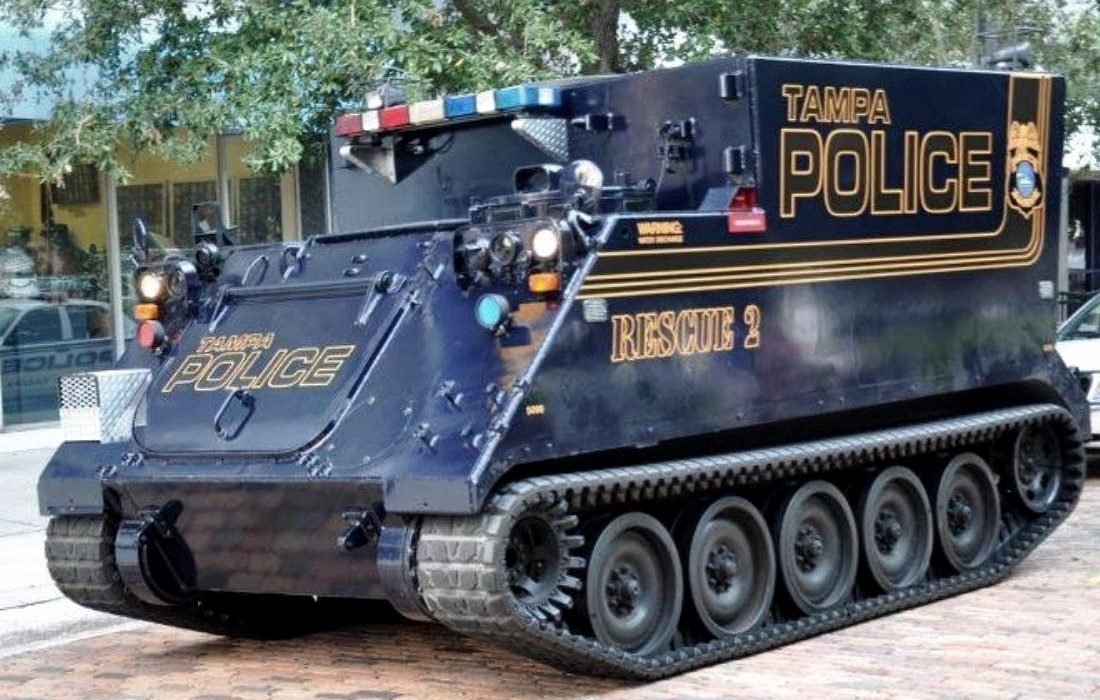
M577 rescue vehicle of the Tampa Police Department, Florida

- Alliance Police Department
- Calhoun County Sheriff's Office
- Central Montgomery County SWAT
- Doraville Police Department
- Draper City Police Department
- Flagler County Sheriff's Office
- Fulton County Sheriff's Office
- Jefferson County Sheriff's Office
- Lakeland Police Department
- Leesburg Police Department
- Lewiston Police Department
- Los Angeles Police Department
- Macomb County Sheriff's Office
- Mason Police Department
- Metro SWAT (Hudson, Ohio)
- Miami-Dade Police Department
- Midland County Sheriff's Office
- Newtown Township Police Department
- New York City Department of Corrections
- Orange County Sheriff's Office
- Osceola County Sheriff's Office
- Richland County Sheriff's Office
- Saginaw Police Department
- Solano County Sheriff's Office
- Southeast Ohio STAR
- Stroud Area Regional Police Department
- Tampa Police Department
- Toledo Police Department
- Troy Police Department
- Tucson Police Department
- Volusia County Sheriff's Office
- Wood County Sheriff's Office

Global law enforcement agencies known to operate or have operated M113s or variants include:

- Royal Canadian Mounted Police
