= Husky (disambiguation) =

Husky is a general term for several breeds of dog used as sled dogs, which are believed to have originated in Siberia.

Husky or huskie may also refer to:

== Sports teams ==
=== University ===
- UConn Huskies, the teams of the University of Connecticut, Connecticut, United States
- Houston Christian Huskies, the teams of Houston Christian University, Houston, Texas, United States
  - Husky Stadium (Houston Christian University)
  - Husky Field (Houston Christian Baseball)
  - Husky Field (softball)
- Michigan Tech Huskies, the teams of Michigan Technological University, Houghton, Michigan, United States
  - Blizzard T. Husky, the mascot of Michigan Technological University
- Northeastern Huskies, the teams of Northeastern University, Boston, Massachusetts
- Northern Illinois Huskies, the teams of Northern Illinois University, DeKalb, Illinois, United States
  - Huskie Stadium
- Saint Mary's Huskies, the teams of Saint Mary's University, Halifax, Nova Scotia, Canada
- St. Cloud State Huskies, the teams of St. Cloud State University, St. Cloud, Minnesota, United States
  - Husky Stadium (St. Cloud)
- Saskatchewan Huskies, the teams of the University of Saskatchewan, Canada
- Washington Huskies, the teams of the University of Washington, Seattle, Washington, United States
  - Husky Stadium
  - Husky Ballpark

=== Ice hockey ===
==== Canada ====
- Les Husky de Cowansville, a former junior "A" team based in Cowansville, Quebec
- Durham Huskies (c. 1908–1992), a franchise based in Durham, Ontario
- Durham Huskies (1996–2001), a junior "A" team
- Fort St. John Huskies, a junior "B" team in British Columbia
- Halton Huskies, a junior "A" team in Stoney Creek, Ontario
- Onaping Falls Huskies, a junior "A" team in Ontario
- Rouyn-Noranda Huskies, part of the Quebec Major Junior Hockey League
- Steinbach Huskies, junior "C" and senior teams based in Steinbach, Manitoba
- Whitehorse Huskies, a Canadian senior "AAA" team out of Whitehorse, Yukon

==== Elsewhere ====
- Houston Huskies, a minor league team based in Houston, Texas
- North Iowa Huskies, a junior team that was based in Mason City, Iowa
- EC Kassel Huskies, a German professional team based in Kassel
- Cardiff Huskies, a sledge hockey team based in Cardiff, Wales

=== Other sports teams ===
- Toronto Huskies, a defunct basketball team
- Edmonton Huskies, a Canadian Junior Football team
- Huskies de Rouen, a French baseball team

== Businesses and products ==
- Husky Energy, an integrated energy company and chain of gas stations
- Husky (computer), a handheld microcomputer issued in 1981
- Husky (tool brand), a tool brand of The Home Depot
- Husky (toy brand), a line of small die-cast toy vehicles
- Husqvarna Group, sometimes known as Husky in English
- Husky, a tobacco brand of the U.S. Smokeless Tobacco Company
- For brands sometimes called "Husky" derived from Huskvarna, Sweden, see Husqvarna

== Military ==
- Operation Husky, the Allied invasion of Sicily in World War II
- Airbus CC-330 Husky, a Royal Canadian Air Force transport and refueling aircraft
- Kaman HH-43 Huskie, an American helicopter
- 437 Transport Squadron, nicknamed Husky, a unit of the Royal Canadian Air Force
- M116 Husky, a United States Marine Corps amphibious cargo carrier/marginal terrain vehicle
- Husky (armoured recovery vehicle), used by the Canadian military
- Husky TSV, an armoured tactical support vehicle
- Husky VMMD, a vehicle-mounted mine detector
- HMCS Husky, a Royal Canadian Navy Second World War armed yacht
- Laika-class submarine, also known as the Husky class, a series of nuclear submarines being developed for the Russian Navy

== People ==
- Ferlin Husky (1925–2011), American country music singer
- Rick Husky (born 1940), American television writer and producer, creator of the television series T. J. Hooker
- S. Husky Höskulds, Grammy Award-winning audio engineer
- Husky (rapper) (born 1993), Russian hip hop performer
- Stefan "Husky" Hüskens, a former member of the German thrash metal band Sodom
- Mike Lamond (born 1987), online alias Husky, a Starcraft II commentator and broadcaster
- Husky Harris, a ring name of Bray Wyatt (1987–2023), American professional wrestler

== Places ==
=== Antarctica ===
- Husky Pass, Bowers Mountains
- Husky Dome, a snow dome in the Queen Maud Mountains
- Husky Heights, Queen Maud Mountains
- Husky Massif, a rock outcrop in the Prince Charles Mountains

=== Canada ===
- Husky Lakes, Northwest Territories
- Husky Formation, Yukon, a geological formation

== Music ==
- Husky (album), a 2006 album by Skerik's Syncopated Taint Septet
- Husky (band), an Australian indie folk band

== Transportation ==
=== Air ===
- Advanced Aviation Husky, an ultralight aircraft
- Aviat Husky, a two-seat, high-wing, utility light aircraft
- Beagle Husky, a three-seat British light aircraft built in the 1960s
- Fairchild F-11 Husky, a Canadian bush plane
- Kaman K-1125, a prototype American civilian helicopter sometimes called the Huskie III
- Fleet Model 1, originally the Consolidated Model 14 Husky Junior, a family of two-seat trainer and sports biplanes produced in the 1920s and 1930s

=== Land ===
- Hillman Husky, a passenger car made from 1954 to 1970
- A nickname for Husqvarna Motorcycles
- Buses run by Husky Tours in the Philippines

=== Sea ===
- Husky (1959 ship), see Boats of the Mackenzie River watershed

== See also ==
- Husky the Muskie, an outdoor sculpture in Kenora, Ontario
- Huskey (surname)
- Huskii (born 1992), Australian rapper and musician
