= General Motors LAV =

Canadian/American family of wheeled armored fighting vehicles

The Light Armoured Vehicle (LAV) is a series of armoured vehicles built by General Dynamics Land Systems – Canada (GDLS-C), a London, Ontario-based subsidiary of General Dynamics. It is a license-produced version of the Mowag Piranha. The first generation of LAV was created by Mowag for the Armoured Vehicle General Purpose (AVGP) requirement of the Canadian Army. This was a 6x6 variant of the Piranha I produced by General Motors Diesel in London, Ontario. Since entering service in 1976, it has undergone a number of upgrades. The LAV II introduced the now-familiar 8x8 configuration. The LAV continues to form the backbone of the Canadian Army's combat vehicle fleet. The LAV series of vehicles exist in a number of different variants and are used in a number of different roles such as armoured personnel carriers, engineering vehicles, command posts, ambulances and armoured recovery vehicles.

GMC had sold over 3,000 LAVs as of 1999, and had been more successful than the Piranha.

== LAV I ==
LAV I
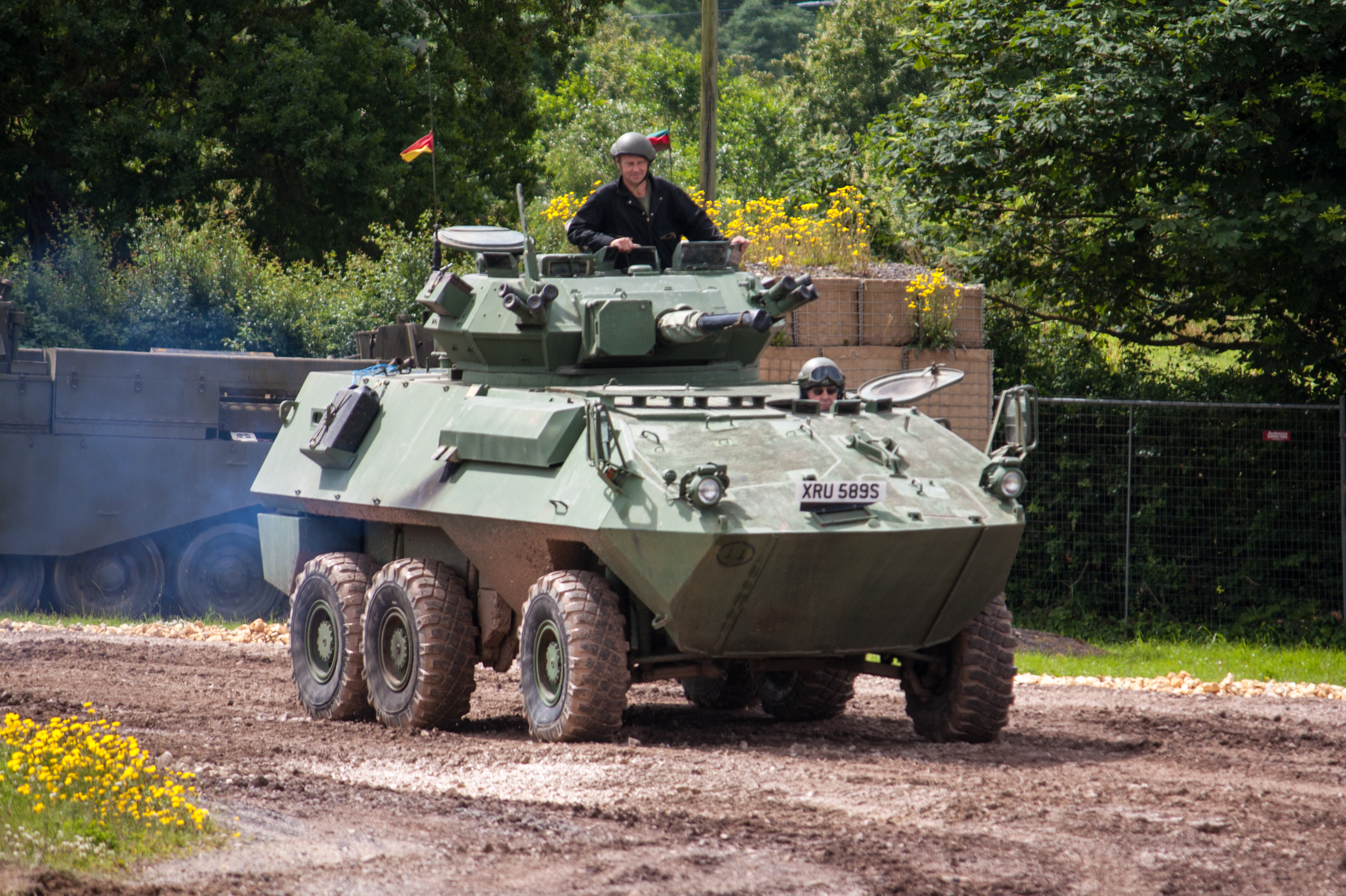
- A surplus Cougar seen in a militaria event in the UK.
- Type: Armoured fighting vehicle
- Place of origin: Canada

Service history
- In service: 1976–present
- Used by: See Operators

Production history
- No. built: Cougar – 195; Grizzly – 274; Husky – 27
- Variants: See Variants

Specifications
- Mass: 10.7 t
- Length: 5.97 m
- Width: 2.50 m
- Crew: Cougar: 3 (Commander, gunner and driver, 2 soldiers in rear of vehicle); Husky: 2 (Driver and technician); Grizzly: Commander, gunner and driver, 6 soldiers in rear
- Main armament: Cougar: 76 mm L23A1 gun Grizzly: 12.7mm heavy machine gun Husky: 7.62 mm machine gun
- Engine: 275 hp Detroit Diesel 6V53T two-cycle turbo-charged diesel
- Suspension: 6×6
- Maximum speed: 100 km/h

In 1974 the Canadian military launched an acquisition program to procure a light vehicle for the Army reserves. The Army desired a flexible vehicle that could be adapted to serve in many different styles of conflict. The military drafted requirements for four different variants. Cadillac-Gage seemed primed to win this contract. The Swiss firm Mowag pitched its Piranha. Mowag partnered with General Motors Diesel to manufacture the AVGP at GM's London, Ontario plant. In March 1976, the Piranha was selected.

The AVGP variants were the Cougar armoured fighting vehicle, the Grizzly armoured personnel carrier, and the Husky armoured recovery vehicle.

The Canadian Army retired all AVGP variants beginning in 2005. However, a number of the retired vehicles were transferred to other militaries and police forces, where they continue to serve.

The AVGP had propellers and trim vanes for amphibious use, like the eight-wheeled Bison, which was the vehicle family's immediate successor.

=== History ===
The AVGP variants were introduced into Canadian service in the late 1970s. Intended for use only in Canada, they were pressed into service for several United Nations missions, including UNPROFOR and the mission to Somalia. One Grizzly, on a peace-keeping mission, was captured by Serb forces in the late 1990s.

The Cougar was used for training in Canada, and informally labelled a "tank trainer". During the 1980s and 1990s, it was used by armoured units as a fire support vehicle, for those units not equipped with the Leopard tank. The squadrons equipped with the Cougar in those regiments were humorously referred to as the "boat squadron" as opposed to the reconnaissance squadrons, which were equipped with the Lynx, and later the Coyote Reconnaissance Vehicle.

The Grizzly was used as an armoured personnel carrier in regular force infantry battalions not equipped with the M113, and also by reserve units. The majority of vehicles had their marine propulsion systems removed. Under the Wheeled LAV Life Extension project, the Canadian Forces planned to convert Grizzly and Husky vehicles to support variants, such as Command Post and Mobile Repair Team Vehicle. However, the project was cancelled in 2005, and the vehicles retired.

=== Variants ===
Variants of the AVGP are:

Cougar

- Used as a tank trainer and Armoured Fighting Vehicle
- Three-soldier crew
- Turret of a British Scorpion reconnaissance vehicle (76mm main gun)

Grizzly

- Armoured personnel carrier (APC)
- Three-soldier crew
- Designed to carry a section of infantry
- Mounting a Cadillac-Gage 1 metre turret, armed with a .50 BMG and a 7.62 mm machine gun

Husky

- Armoured recovery vehicle (ARV)
- Two-soldier crew
- Designed to provide mechanical support for the other two vehicles

== LAV II ==
LAV II
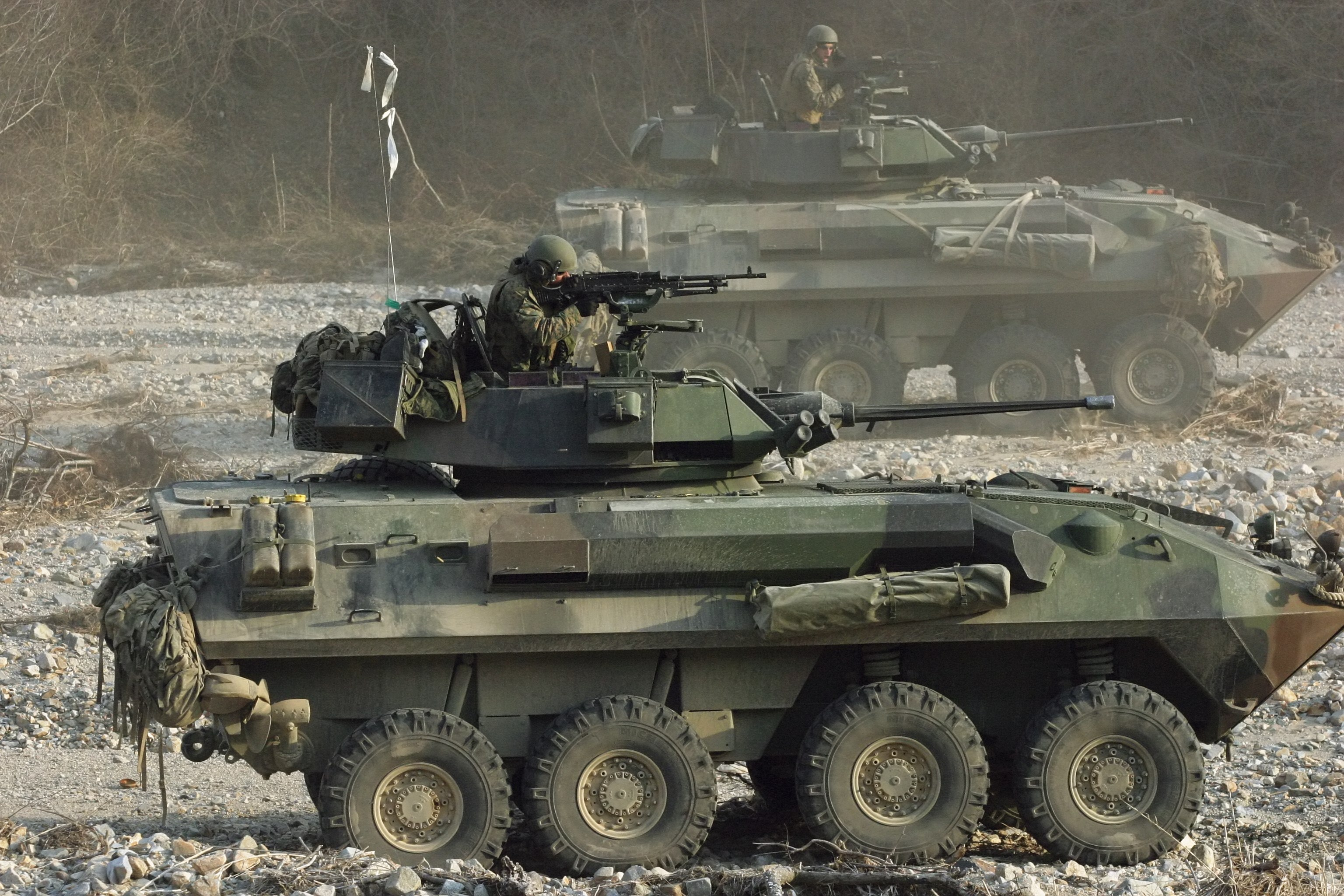
- American LAV-25s in 2006

Service history
- In service: 1983–present

Production history
- Designer: General Motors Diesel

Specifications
- Mass: 14.4 t (15.9 short tons)
- Length: 6.39 m (21.0 ft)
- Width: 2.50 m (8.2 ft)
- Height: 2.69 m (8.8 ft)
- Main armament: M242 25mm chain gun
- Engine: Detroit Diesel 6V53T; 275hp
- Suspension: 8×8 wheeled, 4× drive
- Operational range: 650 km (400 mi)
- Maximum speed: 100 km/h (62 mph) (land); 10 km/h (5.4 kn) (water)

The LAV II is the second generation of the LAV family. The LAV II is an 8x8 vehicle based on the 6x6 Armoured Vehicle General Purpose. It was produced by General Motors Diesel (now General Dynamics Land Systems Canada) in London, Ontario. The United States Marine Corps was the first user of the LAV II, which it calls the LAV-25. Canada procured two main variants: the Coyote Reconnaissance Vehicle and the Bison armoured utility vehicle.

=== LAV-25 ===
During the 1980s, the U.S. Marine Corps began looking for a light armored vehicle to give their divisions greater mobility. They chose the Light Armored Vehicle design from General Motors Diesel. The LAV-25 was based on the Armoured Vehicle General Purpose (LAV I) of the Canadian Army. It entered service with the Marines in 1983. The U.S. Army was interested in these vehicles at the time but did not order any (however they did later adopt similar vehicles with the introduction of the Stryker family). The Army did, however, borrow at least a dozen LAV-25s for use by the 82nd Airborne Division, 3-73rd Armor for a scout platoon during the Gulf War. These LAV-25s were returned to the Marine Corps after the conflict. The USMC ordered 758 vehicles of all variants. LAVs first saw combat during the Invasion of Panama in 1989 and continued service in the Gulf War, Iraq War, and the War in Afghanistan.

A USMC light-armored reconnaissance battalion includes 56 LAV-25s, 16 LAV-ATs, 12 LAV-Ls, 8 LAV-Ms, 4 LAV-Rs, 4 LAV-C2s, and an unknown number of LAV-MEWSS vehicles.

=== Bison ===
The Bison is an armoured vehicle based on the 8x8 LAV-25 platform and was originally designed as an armoured personnel carrier. Entering service in 1990, it was used mainly as an armoured utility vehicle having a number of different sub-variants throughout its years of service.

==== Design ====
By starting with a basic LAV-25, the Bison design process took only seven days. The Bison differs from the baseline LAV-25 by raising the height of the roof, removing the turret ring, placing a commander's cupola behind the driver, and incorporating a rail mount system in the cargo/passenger compartment to quickly change mission specific equipment.

The Canadian Forces began upgrading the Bison between 2002 and 2008. The upgrades include improved engine power, new torsion bars, fittings for add-on armour, air conditioning, and the VRS respirator system for NBC defence.

==== Sub-variants ====
The Bison's rail mount system allows it to be adapted to a variety of roles without any major modifications. Bisons used by the Canadian Forces have been adapted for use as armoured personnel carriers (original configuration - mostly replaced in this role by the LAV III), 81mm mortar carriers, ambulances (32), Mobile Repair Team (MRT) vehicles (32), Armoured recovery vehicles (32), electronic warfare vehicles (25), and NBC reconnaissance vehicles (4).

=== Coyote Reconnaissance Vehicle ===
The Coyote has been in service from 1996 and was acquired for use in the light reconnaissance (scout) role, although was also initially used as an armoured fighting vehicle in the role of medium tank trainer within armoured squadrons in the same way as the AVGP it replaced. In service since 1996, the Coyote is a later generation of the LAV-25 and is of the same family and similar generation as the Bison APC and the Australian ASLAV.

==== Armament ====
The Coyotes mount a 25×137mm M242 Bushmaster chain gun. The main gun and coax machine gun are 2-axis stabilized. The turret is equipped with a laser rangefinder, but no ballistic computer; elevation and lead corrections are applied manually by the gunner using multi-stadia reticules in the day, thermal, and image intensification sights. The turret is also equipped with grenade dischargers that can be loaded with smoke and fragmentation grenades.

==== Mobility ====
The Coyote is powered by a Detroit Diesel 6V53T engine developing 400 horsepower (300 kW), and can reach speeds of 100 kilometres per hour (62 mph) (on road). The Coyote has a maximum road range of 660 kilometres (410 mi). It uses a larger wheel than initially used on the Bison and AVGP (these vehicles were later retrofitted with this wheel). The Coyote can be transported on a C-130 plane but the turret needs first to be removed.

==== Service history ====
Since the introduction of the Coyote to the Canadian Armed Forces, the vehicle has served national interest domestically and abroad. The Coyote served during the United Nations/ NATO missions in Bosnia and Herzegovina, Macedonia, Kosovo, and in Afghanistan. The Coyote is currently being retired and is being replaced by a mix of TAPV and LAV 6 armoured vehicles.

== LAV III ==
Light Armoured Vehicle III
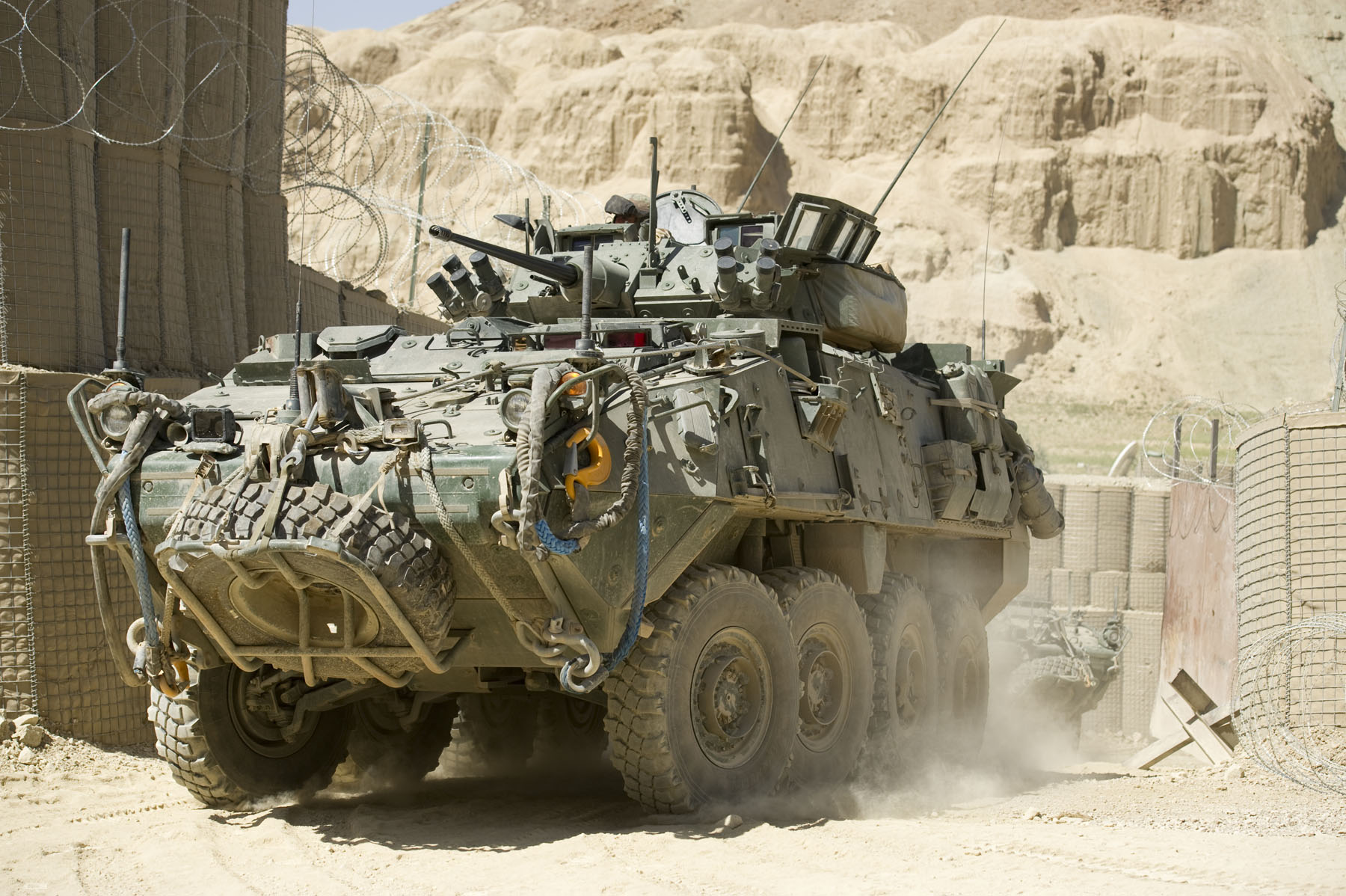
- A New Zealand Army LAV III in Afghanistan

Service history
- In service: 1999–present

Specifications
- Mass: 16.95 t
- Length: 6.98 m (22 ft 11 in)
- Width: 2.7 m (8 ft 10 in)
- Height: 2.8 m (9 ft 2 in)
- Engine: Caterpillar 3126 diesel 260 kW (350 hp)
- Suspension: Hydropneumatic
- Operational range: 450 km (280 mi)
- Maximum speed: 100 km/h (62 mph)

The LAV III, originally designated as the LAV III Kodiak by the Canadian Army, is the third generation LAV and first entered service in 1999. It was developed from the LAV II and manufactured by General Motors Diesel (later GDLS-C) and is the primary mechanized infantry vehicle of the New Zealand Army. It was formerly used by Canadian Army before being replaced by the LAV 6.0. It is the parent vehicle of the Stryker AFV family used by the U.S. Army and other operators.

=== Development ===
By July 1991, the Canadian Armed Forces had identified the need to replace their aging fleet of 1960s and 1970s-era armoured personnel carriers. As a result, Multi-Role Combat Vehicle (MRCV) project was launched by the sitting Conservative government. The mandate of the MRCV project was to provide a series of vehicles based on a common chassis which would replace the M113 armored personnel carrier, Lynx reconnaissance vehicle, Grizzly armoured personnel carrier, and Bison armoured personnel carrier. The project was, however, deemed unaffordable and cancelled by March 1992.

By 1994, after the Liberal Party had returned to government, the Army was still in need of new vehicles. As a result, the Army embarked on the Light Armoured Vehicle Project, which would adapt parts of the MRCV Project, and be implemented incrementally to spread out the costs. Also, the requirement to replace the Bisons was dropped.

In August 1995, General Motors Diesel (later renamed GM Defense, and subsequently purchased by GDLS of London, Ontario) was awarded the contract to produce the LAV III which would replace the Grizzly and a large portion of the M113s. The LAV III would incorporate the turret and weapon system used with the Coyote (which was produced at the same location).

=== Design ===
==== Mobility ====
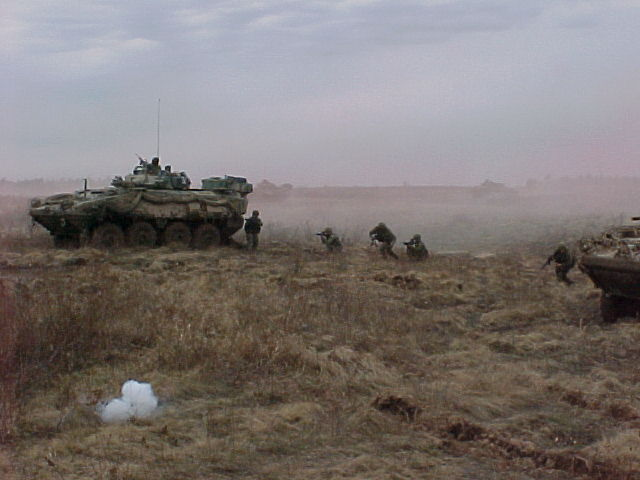
Canadian infantry dismounting from a LAV III at CFB Gagetown

The LAV III is powered by a Caterpillar 3126 diesel engine developing 350 horsepower (260 kW) and can reach speeds above 100 kilometres per hour. The vehicle is fitted with 8x8 drive and also equipped with a central tire inflation system, which allows it to adjust to different terrain, including off-road. The LAV III is fitted with a modern anti-locking brake system (ABS). Unlike earlier versions of the LAV, the LAV III does not have amphibious capabilities.

The LAV III's turret gives the vehicle a higher centre of gravity than the LAV family was initially designed for. This has led to concerns that the vehicle is more likely to roll over on uneven terrain, and there have been several recorded rollovers.

==== Protection ====
The basic armour of the LAV III, covering the Standardization Agreement STANAG 4569 level III, which provides all-round protection against 7.62×51mm NATO small calibre rounds. A ceramic appliqué armour (MEXAS) can be added, which protects against 14.5×114mm heavy calibre rounds from 500 meters. The LAV III can be also fitted with cage armour, which provides protection against shaped charges. The LAV III is fitted with a nuclear, biological, chemical (NBC) filtration system accompanied with a GID-3 chemical detector and AN/VDR-2 radiation detector systems. The LAV III was designed to produce a very low and very compact structure to minimize radar and IR-signatures. The LAV III also uses heat-absorbing filters to provide temporary protection against thermal imaging (TIS), image intensifiers and infrared cameras (IR). General Dynamics is in the process of integrating the LAV III with an active protection system based on the Israeli Trophy system.

The majority of Canadian casualties in Afghanistan have occurred during a patrol aboard a LAV III; the LAV III is the most commonly used Canadian armoured personnel carrier in theatre, and this represents a normal association between use and likelihood to encounter a mine or improvised explosive device. The LAV III offers comparable or better protection than most other infantry carriers used in Afghanistan. In an effort to improve protection as a result of experiences in Afghanistan, future LAV III upgrades will likely include improved mine and IED protection.

==== Armament ====
The LAV III is fitted with a two-man turret, armed with the M242 Bushmaster 25 mm caliber chain gun and a coaxial 7.62-mm machine gun. One more 5.56 mm or 7.62 mm machine guns is positioned on top of the turret. The LAV III also has eight 76-mm grenade launchers in two clusters of four launchers positioned on each side of the turret. The grenade launchers are intended for smoke grenades. In 2009, a number of LAV III's were modified with a Nanuk remotely controlled weapon station (RCWS) to provide better protection and to increase the chances of survival of the crew against improvised explosive devices and anti-tank mine threats on the battlefield.

==== Sights ====
The LAV III is equipped with a daytime optical Thermal Imaging System (TIS) and Generation III Image Intensification (II). The LAV III is equipped with a Tactical Navigation System (TacNav) to assist in navigation and target location tasks. The LAV III is equipped with an LCD monitor directly connected to the vehicle's external cameras, providing real-time images of the battlefield for the passengers.

=== Service history ===
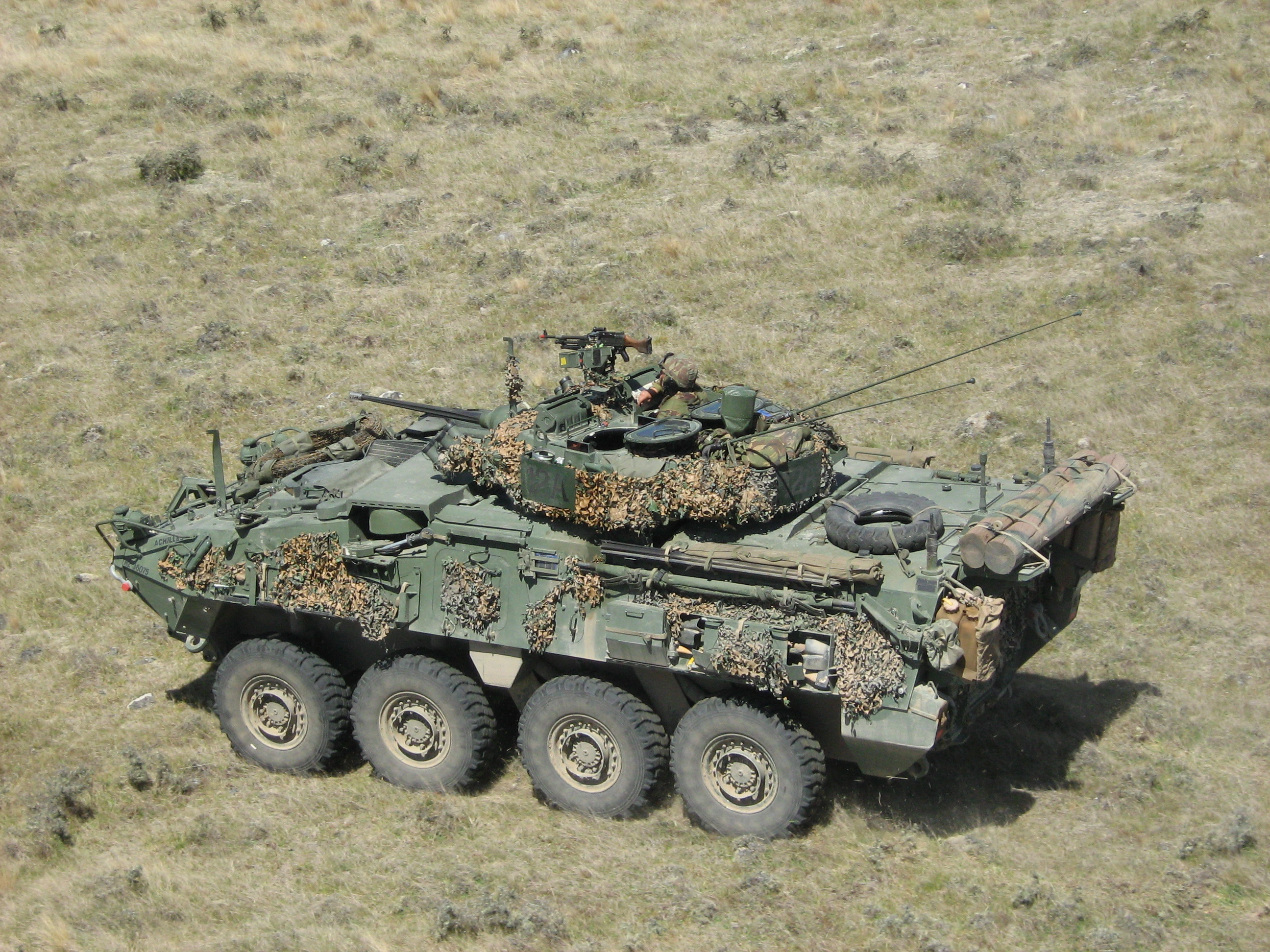
A NZLAV

The LAV III and related versions have been used in the following:

- United Nations Mission in Ethiopia and Eritrea (UNMEE)
- United Nations Mission in Kosovo (UNMIK)
- United Nations Mission in Bosnia and Herzegovina (UNMIBH)
- United Nations Mission in Haiti (UNMIH)
- War in Afghanistan (ISAF)
- Napier shootings
- Operation Lotus
- Response to the 2011 Christchurch earthquake
- Colombian armed conflict

=== New Zealand ===
The New Zealand armed forces purchased 105 NZLAV, of which 102 were standard vehicles and 3 were redesigned for recovery.

In November 2009, it was announced that three NZLAVs would be deployed to assist NZSAS operations in Afghanistan and they were up-armoured. In 2011, these three LAVs were moved to Bamyan to support the provincial reconstruction team there as they were no longer needed in Kabul due to reduced SAS numbers. Five additional LAVs were also flown to Bamyan. One has since been damaged by a roadside bomb.

=== Sub-variants ===
- TOW Under Armour (TUA) – Standard LAV III turret replaced with TOW Under Armour launcher for anti-tank purposes
- Infantry Section Carrier (ISC) – Surplus LAV TUA hulls fitted with a Nanuk Remotely Controlled Weapon Station.
- Observation Post Vehicle (OPV) – Standard LAV III equipped for use by forward observation officer (FOO).
- Command Post Vehicle (CPV) – Standard LAV III equipped for command post duties.
- Engineer LAV (ELAV) – LAV III equipped with a dozer blade and other engineering equipment.
- Infantry Mobility Vehicle (IMV) – Standard NZLAV vehicle used in cavalry, reconnaissance, and forward observer roles.
- Light Obstacle Blade (LOB) – An NZLAV IMV fitted with a small blade for minor earth works and clearing of obstacles.
- Recovery (LAV-R) – NZLAV vehicle fitted with a TR200 winch and earth anchor for recovery operations.
- Multi-Mission Effects Vehicle (MMEV) – The project was canceled in 2005

== LAV 6 ==
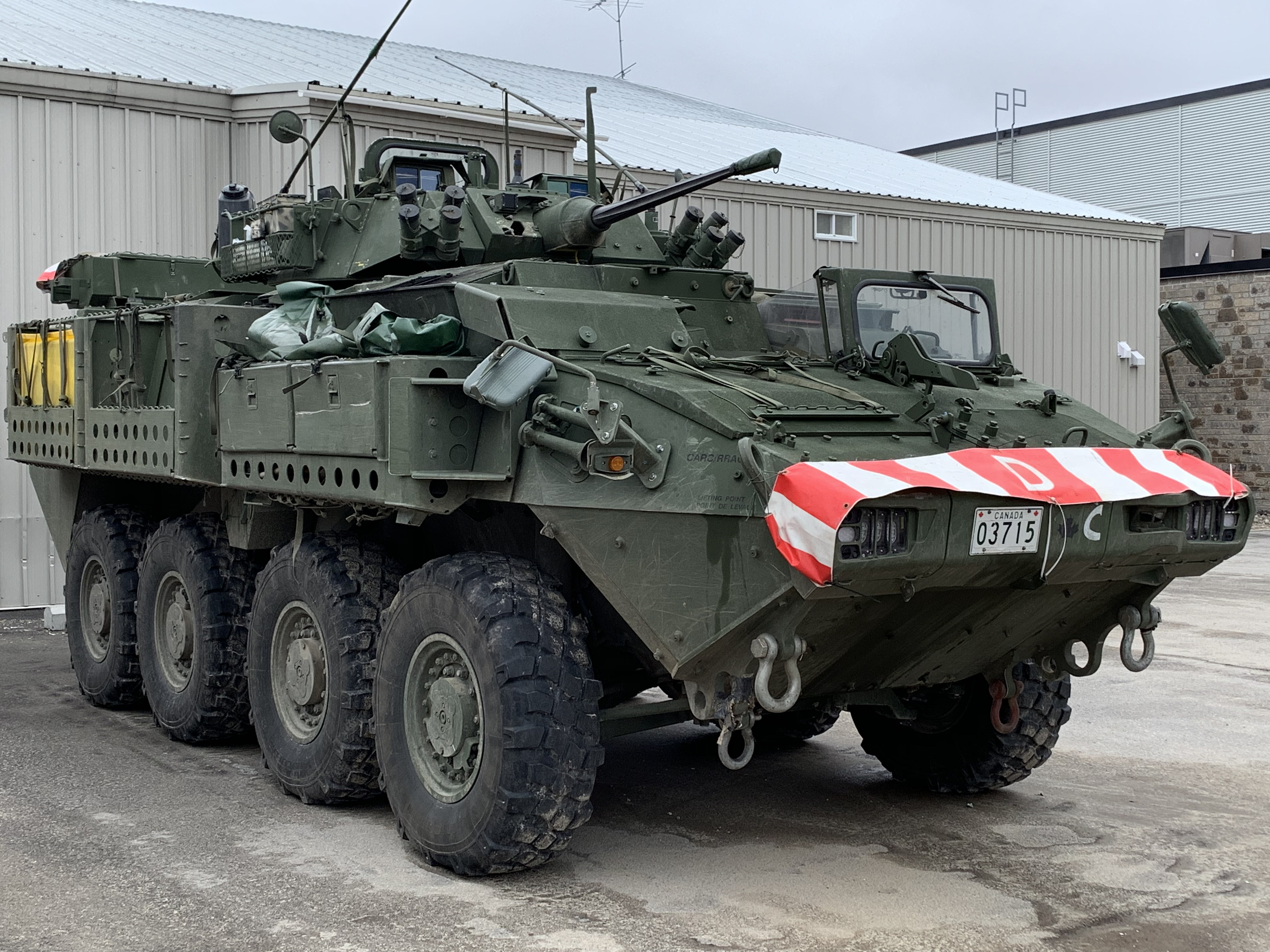
Canadian LAV 6

In October 2011, GDLS-Canada was awarded a contract to upgrade 409 of the service's 651 LAV III APCs to the LAV 6 standard. Four variants were ordered: an infantry section carrier, a command post, an observation post and an engineer vehicle. The upgrade was expected to extend the service life of the vehicle to 2035. In February 2017, the service awarded GDLS-Canada a $404 million contract to upgrade 141 more LAV IIIs. In August 2019, GDLS-Canada received a four-year, $3 billion deal to build 360 armored combat support vehicle variants. The first of these rolled off the assembly line in May 2021.

Saudi Arabia will receive 900 modified LAV 6, for $15 billion.

=== Sub-variants ===
- LAV Reconnaissance Surveillance System (LRSS) – Will replace the Coyote Reconnaissance Vehicle with 66 LAV VI chassis by 2021.
- Armoured Combat Support Vehicle (ACSV) - 360 LAV VI based ACSV will replace the current fleets of LAV II Bison and TLAV (M113). Within this class there are at least 6 variants:
  - Ambulance
  - Electronic Warfare
  - Troop/Cargo
  - Command
  - Maintenance & Recovery
  - Mobile Repair

== See also ==
- BTR, a Soviet and post-Soviet armored fighting vehicle series.
- M113 armored personnel carrier, an American tracked armored vehicle adapted into many variants.
  - Variants of the M113 armored personnel carrier
