= Karl Pettersens Sønner =

Former Norwegian appliance maker in Sarpsborg

KPS – Karl Pettersens Sønner A/S
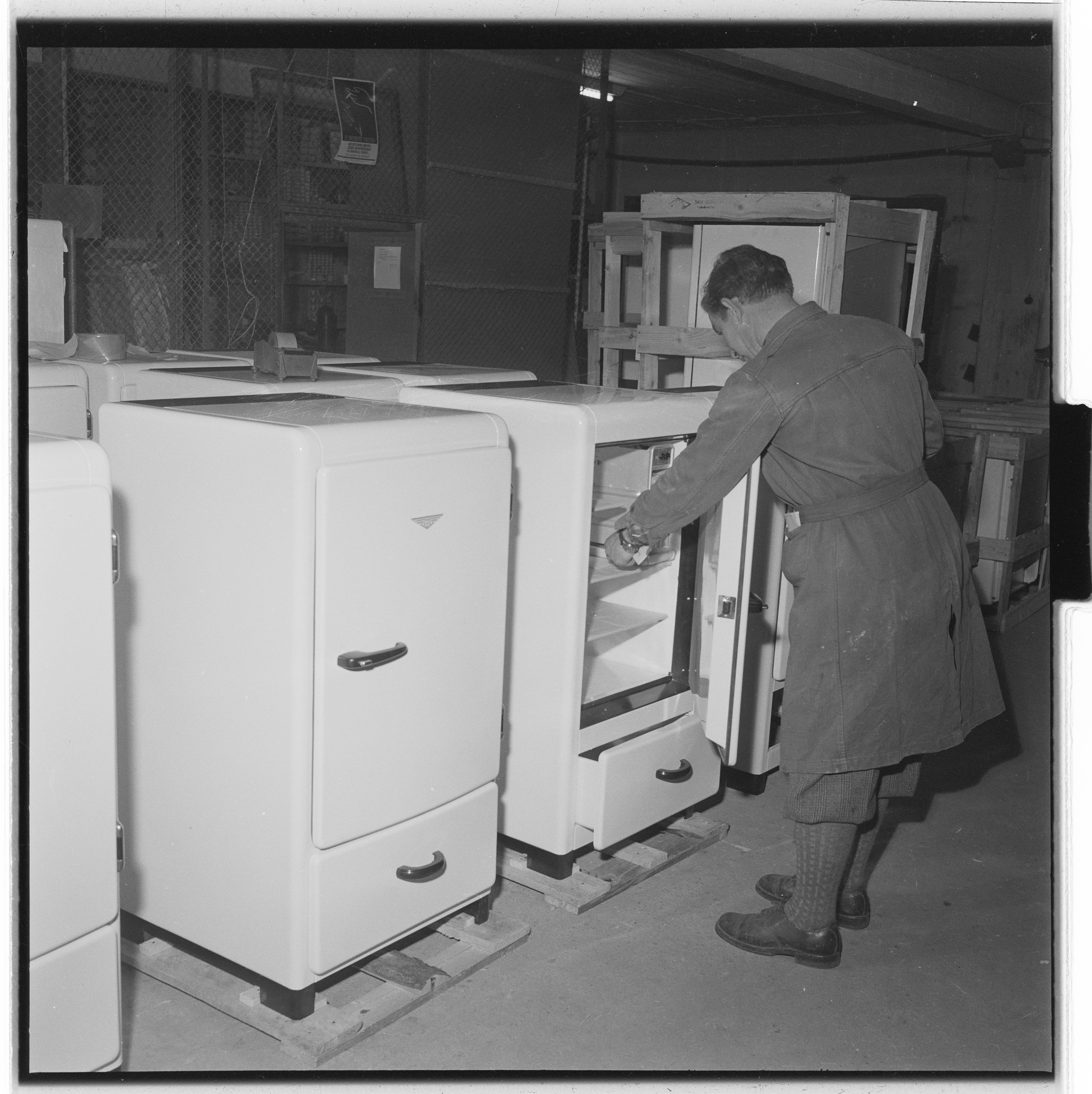
- Formerly: Tunsborg
- Company type: Aksjeselskap
- Industry: Home appliances
- Founded: 1930
- Founder: Oskar and Rolf Pettersen
- Fate: Acquired by Husqvarna (1973–74), then Electrolux (1977)
- Headquarters: Sarpsborg, Norway
- Products: Refrigerators, cookers, dishwashers

Karl Pettersens Sønner (KPS) was a company in Sarpsborg, Norway, founded in 1930, which grew to become Norway's largest producer of white goods in the 1950s and 1960s.

Founded by the brothers Oskar and Rolf Pettersen, it continued a family business whose roots went back to a smithy started by their grandfather Johan Pettersen in 1866. After making stamped goods in its early years, KPS began producing electric cookers in 1939 and household refrigerators soon after; its first refrigerator reached the market in 1950, and by the mid-1950s refrigerators had become its most important product. The main factory by Tunevannet was built in 1956, and the company's heyday came in the 1960s, when refrigerators and cookers, designed largely by Tor Jacobsen, became market winners through heavy advertising and brand-building.

Facing growing competition and liquidity problems, the family firm was taken over by the Swedish Husqvarna in 1973–1974, and the KPS name was phased out in favor of Husqvarna. From 1975 the Sarpsborg factory took responsibility for all of Husqvarna's dishwasher production. When Husqvarna was bought by Electrolux in 1977, the Sarpsborg plant was renamed Tunsborg and integrated into the larger group, with overlapping cooker and refrigerator production discontinued in favor of products from the Husqvarna family such as chainsaws and lawnmower parts.

As late as 2011 all the bars for Husqvarna's chainsaws were made at the former KPS factory, and the building was sold in 2022, marking the end of Husqvarna's operations in the town.
