= AVGP (disambiguation) =

AVGP is a Canadian military armoured vehicle.

AVGP may refer to:

- AvgP (mathematics) in average-case complexity
- AV-GP (contest), the AV Grand Prix, a Japanese adult video contest, which uses the video label prefix "AVGP-"
