= Mowag Piranha =

Swiss armoured fighting vehicle

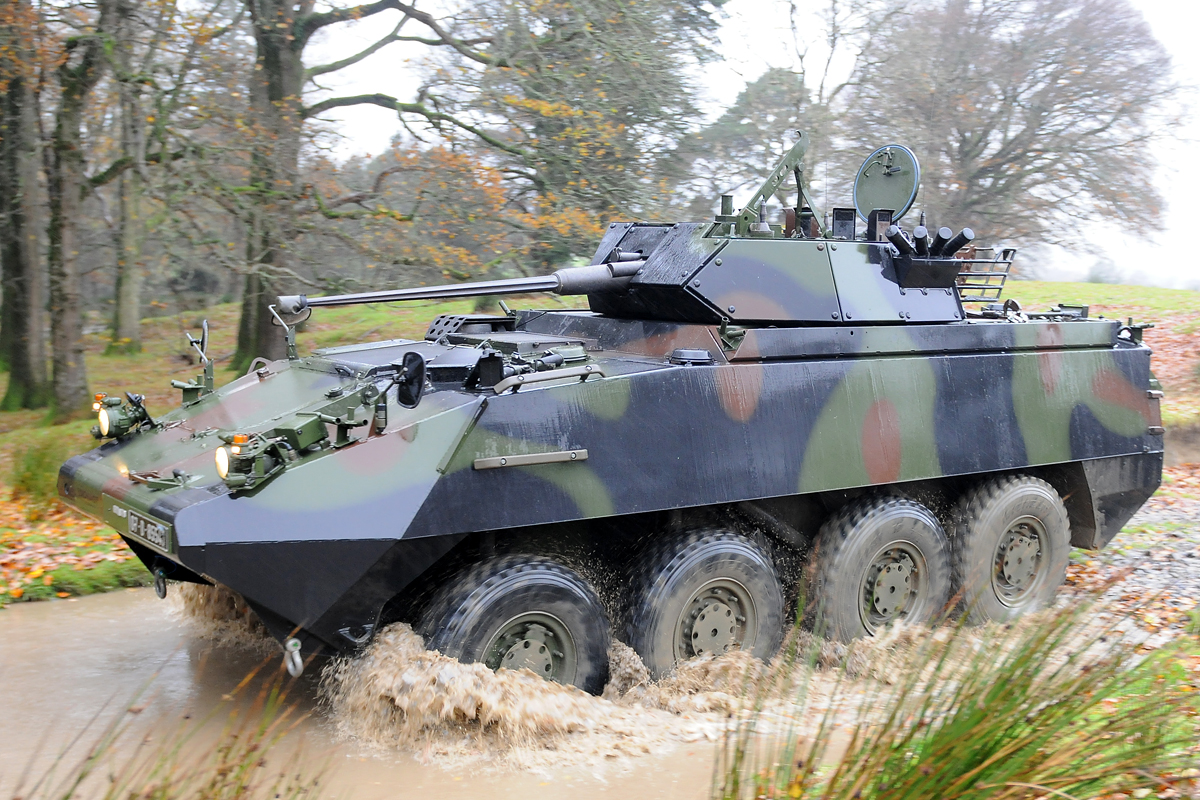
- Irish Army Piranha IIIH MRV armed with a 30 mm autocannon
- Type: Armoured fighting vehicle
- Place of origin: Switzerland

Service history
- Used by: see Operators

Production history
- Designer: MOWAG Motor Car Factory, Kreuzlingen, Switzerland
- Manufacturer: MOWAG
- Produced: 1972–present
- No. built: 12,000+ (incl. LAV and Stryker)
- Variants: Tank destroyer, C3 Command Vehicle, Medevac, APC, police vehicle, pioneer & construction vehicle

Specifications
- Mass: From 9,300 kg (20,500 lb)
- Length: 6.25 to 7.45 m (20 ft 6 in to 24 ft 5 in)
- Width: 2.5 to 2.66 m (8 ft 2 in to 8 ft 9 in)
- Height: 1.8 to 1.98 m (5 ft 11 in to 6 ft 6 in)
- Crew: 3+5; driver, commander, gunner + 5 passengers
- Armor: quick-mount selection, including defense against RPG, IED, NBC
- Main armament: 1 × 12.7 mm MG turret, or MOWAG apex mount, grenade launcher, or TOW anti-tank missile.
- Engine: diesel engine 202 kW 275hp
- Transmission: Allison MT-653 automatic 6-speed planetary gearbox
- Suspension: hydropneumatic 6×6, 8×8, or 10×10 wheeled
- Fuel capacity: 300 L (66 imp gal; 79 US gal)
- Operational range: 780 km (485 mi)
- Maximum speed: 100 km/h (62 mph) road 10 km/h (6 mph) water

The Mowag Piranha is a family of armoured fighting vehicles designed by the Swiss company Mowag (since 2010 General Dynamics European Land Systems – Mowag GmbH).

Five generations of vehicles have been produced, manufactured by Mowag or under licence by other companies such as the LAV, and variants are in service with military forces throughout the world.

== Variants ==
Piranhas are available in 4×4, 6×6, 8×8, and 10×10 wheel versions. There are several variants within these versions, giving different degrees of armour protection and several kinds of turret, for use in a variety of roles. Piranha derivatives have been assigned roles as troop transports, command vehicles, fire support vehicles, tank trainers, and police vehicles.

Piranhas are used by the Swiss Army. Swiss-built Piranha derivatives have been exported to Ireland, Romania, Spain, and Belgium. The Romanian and Belgian armies have selected the Piranha IIIC 8×8. Belgium converted to an all-wheeled force, and replaced all their M113 armoured personnel carriers, AIFVs and Leopard 1 tanks with 268 Piranha IIIC in 7 variants.

Piranha derivatives have been manufactured under license by General Dynamics (Canada), BAE Systems Land Systems (UK), Cardoen and FAMAE (Chile), and in the USA.

A new Piranha V version, weighing between 25 and 30 tons, was announced as the provisional winner of the British Army's Future Rapid Effect System (FRES) program in May 2008, but this selection was reversed seven months later and bidding started again.

General Dynamics European Land Systems launched their new Piranha Class 5 at Eurosatory 2010 on 15 June and it was reported that the British MoD were showing renewed interest, but struggling with budget constraints.

=== Piranha 4×4 IB ===
MOWAG Piranha IB 4×4
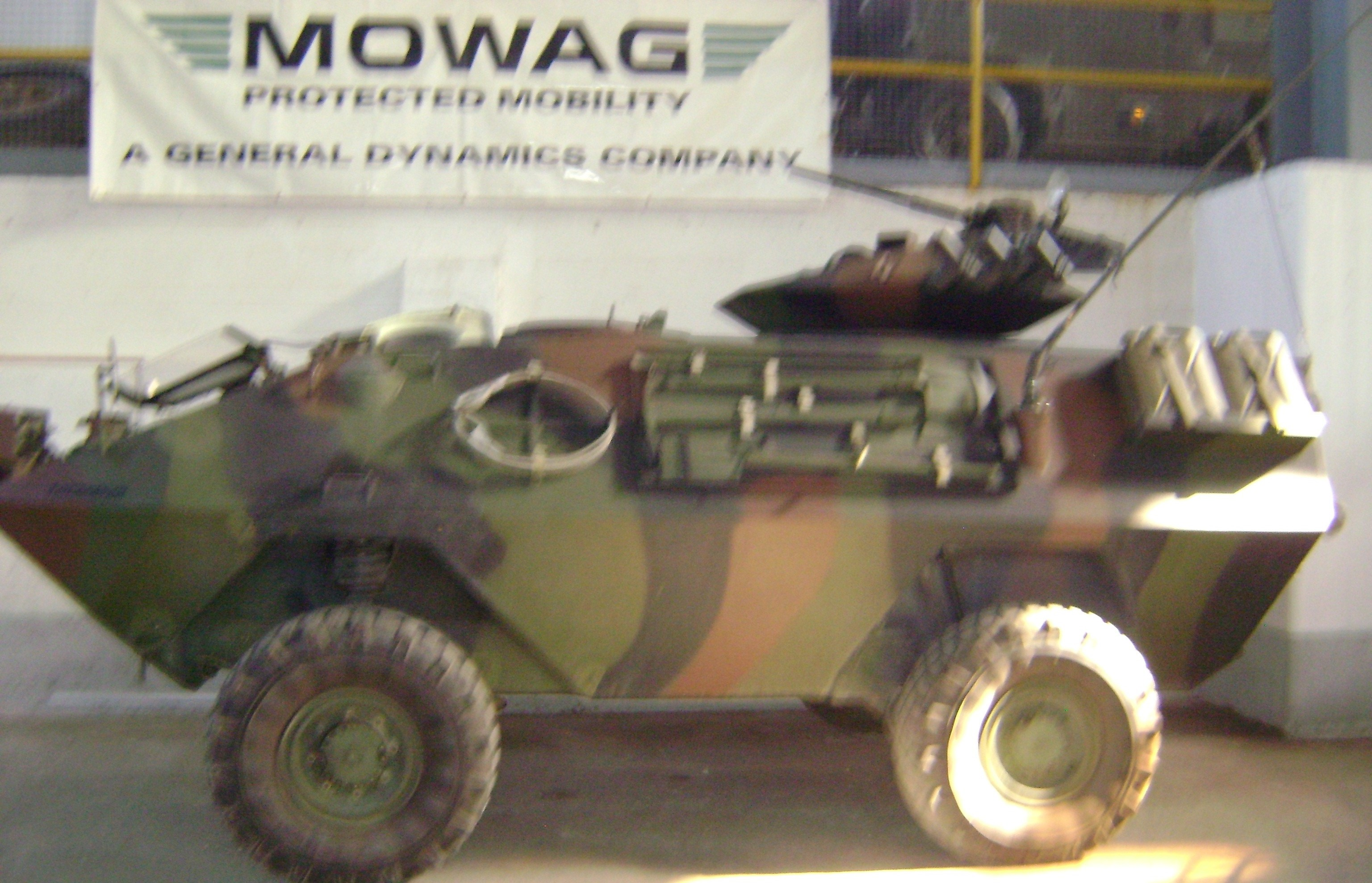
- MOWAG Piranha IB 4×4
- Type: Armoured personnel carrier
- Place of origin: Switzerland

Production history
- Designer: MOWAG Motor Car Factory, Kreuzlingen, Switzerland
- Manufacturer: MOWAG
- Produced: 1974–present
- Variants: Armt, recon

Specifications
- Mass: 6,300 kg (13,900 lb)
- Length: 5.40 m (17 ft 9 in)
- Width: 2.5 m (8 ft 2 in)
- Height: 1.85 m (6 ft 1 in)
- Crew: 7: driver, commander, gunner + 4 more people
- Main armament: 1× 12.7 mm MG in the turret or Wildcat AAA with 2×30mm gun, or TSE 5000 Crotale, or ADATS, or Rheinmetall 105 mm Cannon
- Engine: Chrysler V8 6.78 L gasoline engine 125 kW
- Transmission: NP 540 Chrysler mechanics transmission, 5 forward gears, 1 reverse gear
- Suspension: 4×4 wheeled
- Fuel capacity: 200 l
- Operational range: 700 km (41l/100km)
- Maximum speed: 100 km/h (62 mph) road 10 km/h (6 mph) water

The MOWAG Piranha 4×4 IB was an armored personnel carrier.

To complete the Piranha I Family of 1974, the Piranha 4×4 IB was designed as a light rapid reconnaissance and attack vehicle. It could take part in amphibious operations thanks to twin propellers and could operate in NBC-contaminated areas. The Piranha 4×4 was also designed to meet police needs. The MOWAG Grenadier and Mowag Spy sub-versions were also developed. The prototype of the Piranha 4×4 IB went through numerous tests and received different equipment and different engines. Due to rapid technological development and adjustments to requirements for military vehicles, no Piranha with gasoline engine was sold. The prototype is now in the Schweizerisches Militärmuseum Full.

=== Piranha IB 6×6 ===
MOWAG Piranha IB 6×6
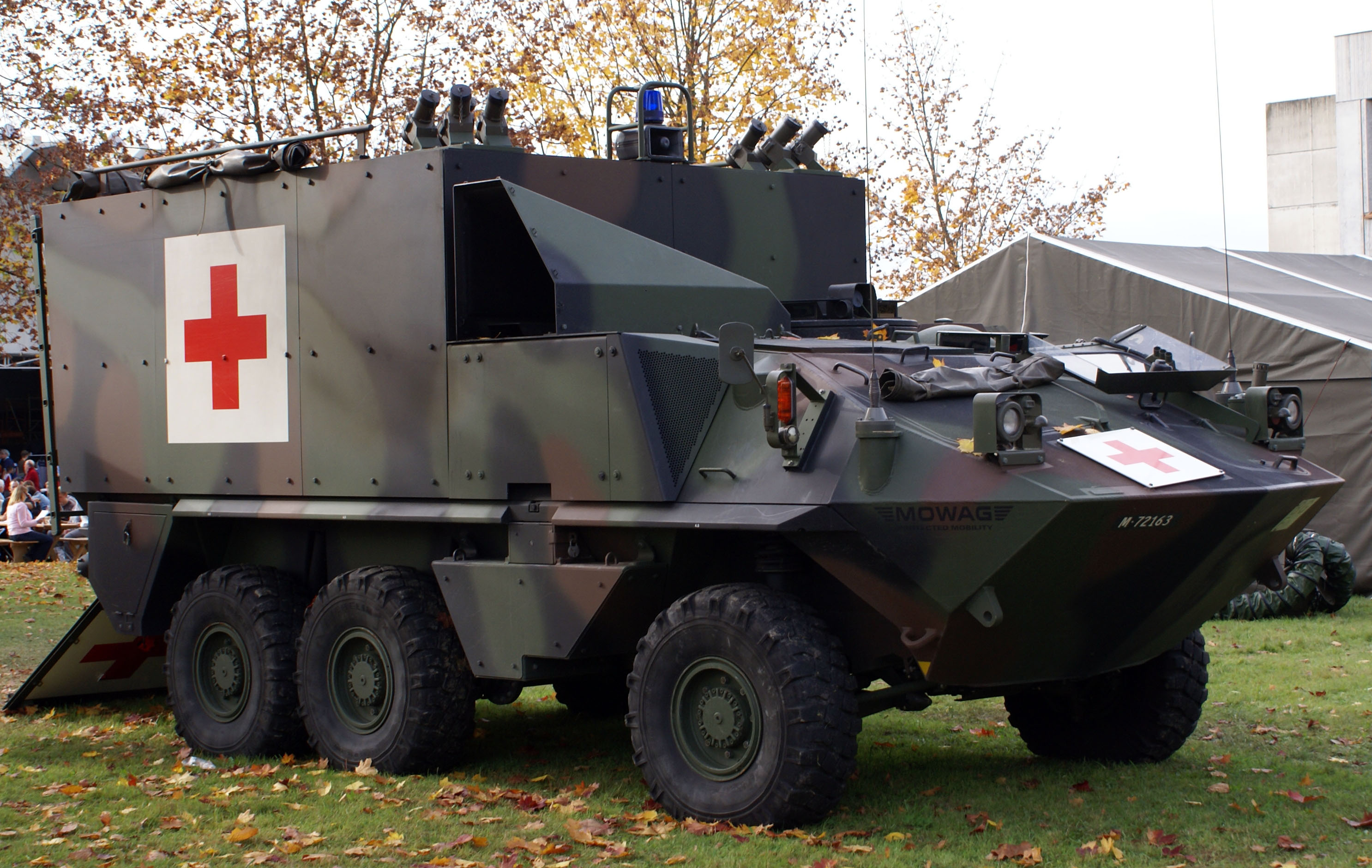
- MOWAG Piranha IB 6×6 Swiss Army
- Type: Armoured fighting vehicle
- Place of origin: Switzerland

Service history
- Used by: Switzerland, Canada, United Nations

Production history
- Designer: MOWAG Motor Car Factory
- Manufacturer: MOWAG
- Produced: 1972–present
- Variants: Tank Destroyer, C3 Command Vehicle Medevac, APC, Police vehicle

Specifications
- Mass: 9,300 kg (20,500 lb)
- Length: 6.25m
- Width: 2.66m
- Height: 1.985m / 2.17m
- Crew: 7: driver, commander, gunner + 4 more people
- Main armament: 1× 12.7 mm MG turret or MOWAG apex mount, or grenade launcher, TOW anti-tank missile, or Mephisto ATM.
- Engine: Chrysler V8 petrol engine HT 413 Displacement 6,780 cm^{3} 147 kW
- Transmission: Allison MT-40 Automatic 6-speed planetary gearbox
- Suspension: 6×6 wheeled
- Fuel capacity: 200 l
- Operational range: 500 km (41l/100km)
- Maximum speed: 100 km/h (62 mph); 10 km/h (6 mph) water

The first Piranha prototype ever built was the 6×6 IB in 1972. It can be seen as a milestone for the Piranha series due to various technical innovation like (at the time) modern designed drive with independent suspension, compact power unit in the right front and (as an amphibian drive) being powered by two propellers. This prototype was demonstrated with different engines and features for potential customers such as the Canadian Army who locally produced them as the AVGP. Switzerland sold a license to manufacture this machine to Chile in 1983. In the Swiss Army, the Piranha 6×6 is used as an ambulance, C3 command vehicle and, together with the BGM-71 TOW anti-tank missile, as a "tank destroyer". The prototype is along with an ambulance Piranha 6×6 on display in the Schweizerisches Militärmuseum Full.

=== MOWAG Piranha IIIC 10×10 ===
Piranha IIIC 10×10
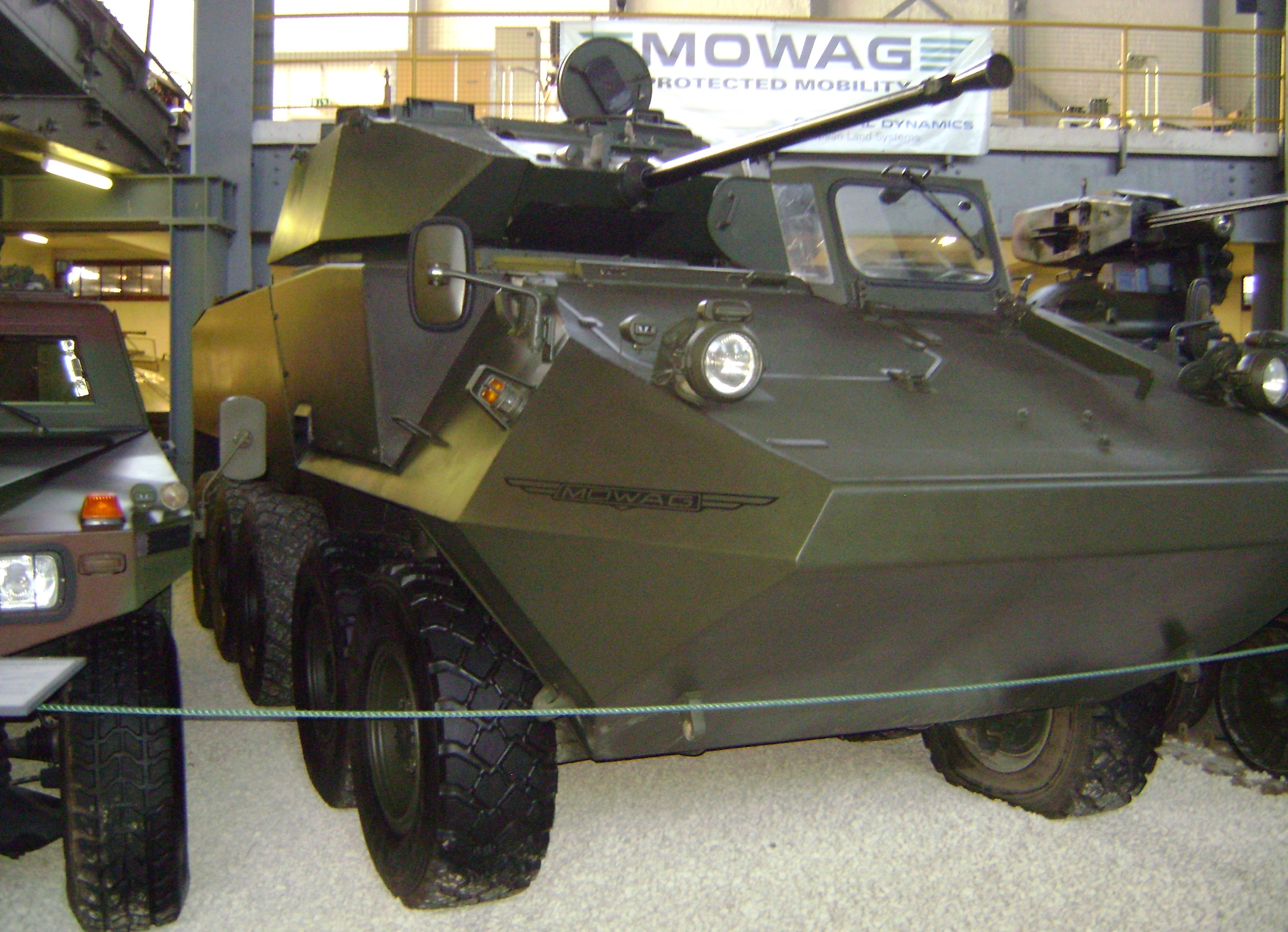
- MOWAG Piranha IIIC 10×10 at Military Museum Full
- Type: Armoured car
- Place of origin: Switzerland

Service history
- Used by: Sweden

Production history
- Designer: MOWAG Motor Car Factory
- Manufacturer: MOWAG
- Produced: 1994
- Variants: Tank, C3 Command Vehicle.

Specifications
- Mass: 18,000 kg (40,000 lb)
- Length: 7.45m
- Width: 2.66m
- Height: 1.98m / 2.17m
- Crew: 3: driver, commander, gunner
- Main armament: turret Oerlikon GDD BOE with 35 mm automatic cannon KDE
- Secondary armament: 7.62 mm coaxial MG FN MAG and 6 × Nebelwurfbecher 76mm
- Engine: Detroit Diesel V6, V6 53TA; 350 hp
- Transmission: Allison MD 3560 P-automatic transmission, 6 forward gears, 1 reverse
- Suspension: 10×10 wheeled
- Maximum speed: 100 km/h (62 mph)

With the continuous evolution of the Piranha family due to increasing demands, and the projected development of the Mowag Shark as a heavy weapons carrier, the Piranha design reached the limit of its payload capacity. The Piranha 10×10 (built in 1994), was an attempt to expand the payload, using a 5th axle of the same type as used in the smaller Piranha models. The Piranha 10×10 was designed as a heavy weapons carrier, but only a small number were built for Sweden as the LIRKA command tank and Kapris radar carrier. The Piranha IIIC 10×10 marked an important development from the Piranha IIIC 8×8. The Piranha IIIC 10×10 prototype was used in various tests, including in Sweden, and now stands in the Schweizerisches Militärmuseum Full.

== Family tree ==
  - Piranha I
    - AVGP – (Canada)
  - Piranha II
    - LAV II – (Canada)
      - LAV-25 – (Canada)
      - Bison and Coyote – (Canada)
      - ASLAV – (Australia)
    - Desert Piranha
  - Piranha III
    - Piranha IIIH
      - LAV III – (Canada)
        - Stryker – (United States, Canada)
        - NZLAV – (Canada)
        - LAV 6 – (Canada)
          - LAV-700
    - Piranha IIIC
  - Piranha IV – (Switzerland)
  - Piranha V – (Switzerland)
    - Dragón

== Operators ==
=== Piranha I ===
(Chile) Chilean army – 225 Piraña I 6×6 and 30 Piraña I 8×8

- including 50 120 mm mortar carriers
- 20 FSV 90 mm version

Ghana Army – 10 Piranha I 4×4, 44 Piranha I 6×6 and 3 Piranha I 8×8

(Nigeria) Nigerian Army – 110 delivered in the 1980s

(Islamic State) Boko Haram - at least two, captured from the Nigerian army

(Switzerland) Swiss Army – 314 Piranha IB 6×6

- 4 driving school "Pzj TOW Fahrschule"
- 310 tank hunter "Pzj TOW", fitted with NM142 turret and a Detroit Diesel 6V-53T (265-300 hp) diesel engine.
  - 40 were transformed into ambulance (Armament Program 2005, delivered in 2006–2007), "San Fz"
  - 160 converted in command vehicle "Kdo Pz" with M153 Protector (Armament Program 2006, delivered in 2008–2010)
  - 110 remained as a tank hunter TOW variant

=== Piranha II ===
Royal Army of Oman – 174 Piranha II in seven versions.

Qatar Armed Forces – 40 Piranha II 8×8 built under licence by former British firm Alvis PLC. (36 CCTS-90 tank hunter with a Belgian Cockerill 90 mm gun and 4 ARVs-recovery). Used during the Saudi Arabian-led intervention in Yemen.

(Saudi Arabia) Saudi Arabian National Guard – 1,117 LAV/Piranha II in 10 versions; another 132 ordered.

- 120 Piranha II

(Sweden) Swedish Army – 54 Piranha II

- 27 10×10 Armoured Sensor Vehicle (protection against 14.5mm)
- 17 10×10 Armoured Command Vehicle (protection against 7.62mm)
- 10 8×8 Armoured Escort Vehicle ordered in 1997

(Switzerland) Swiss Army – 528 Piranha IIC (APC93 8×8):

- 8 military police "Spz Pz 93 Militärpolizei"
- 5 driving school "Spz 93 Fahrschule"
- 515 "Char de grenadiers à roues 93" equipped with turrets KUKA Wehrtechnik Type 606 A1 (which became Rheinmetall), made of the subvariants:
  - 282 Infantry APC variant "Spz 93"
    - tranche 1, 117 ordered in 1993
    - tranche 2, 117 ordered in 1996
    - tranche 3, 48 ordered in 1999
  - 92 command variant "Kdo Pz 93"
    - tranche 1, 28 ordered in 1993
    - tranche 2, 29 ordered in 1996
    - tranche 3, 35 ordered in 1999
  - 141 anti-tank variant "PAL Pz 93", (2 crew + 8 passengers, 8 Dragon anti-tank missiles embarked)
    - tranche 1, 60 ordered in 1993
    - tranche 2, 59 ordered in 1996
    - tranche 3, 22 ordered in 1999

(Switzerland) Geneva Cantonal police – 1 Piranha IIC used by the tactical unit, BI (Brigade d'Intervention)

=== Piranha III ===
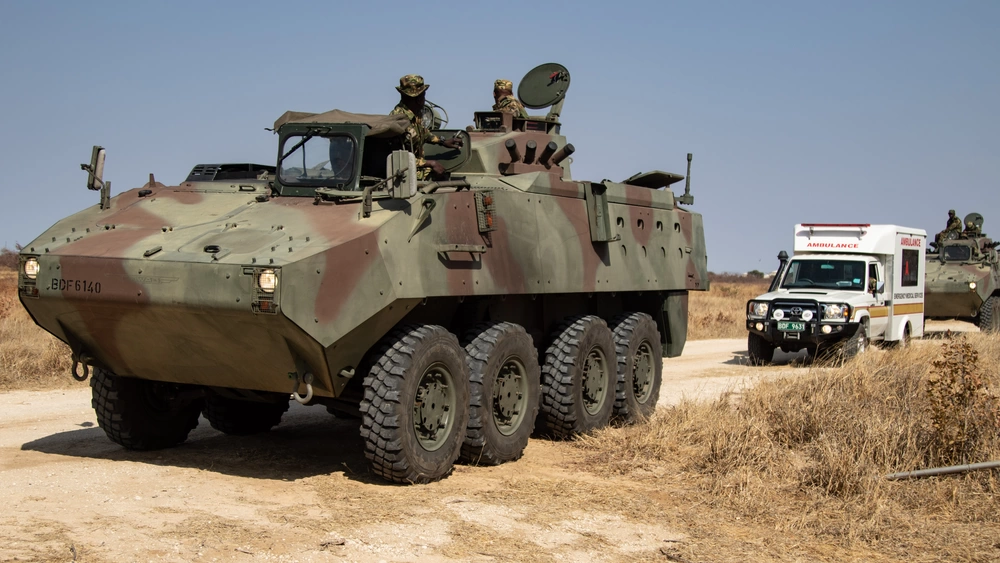
Mowag Piranha IIIC - Botswana (first batch)

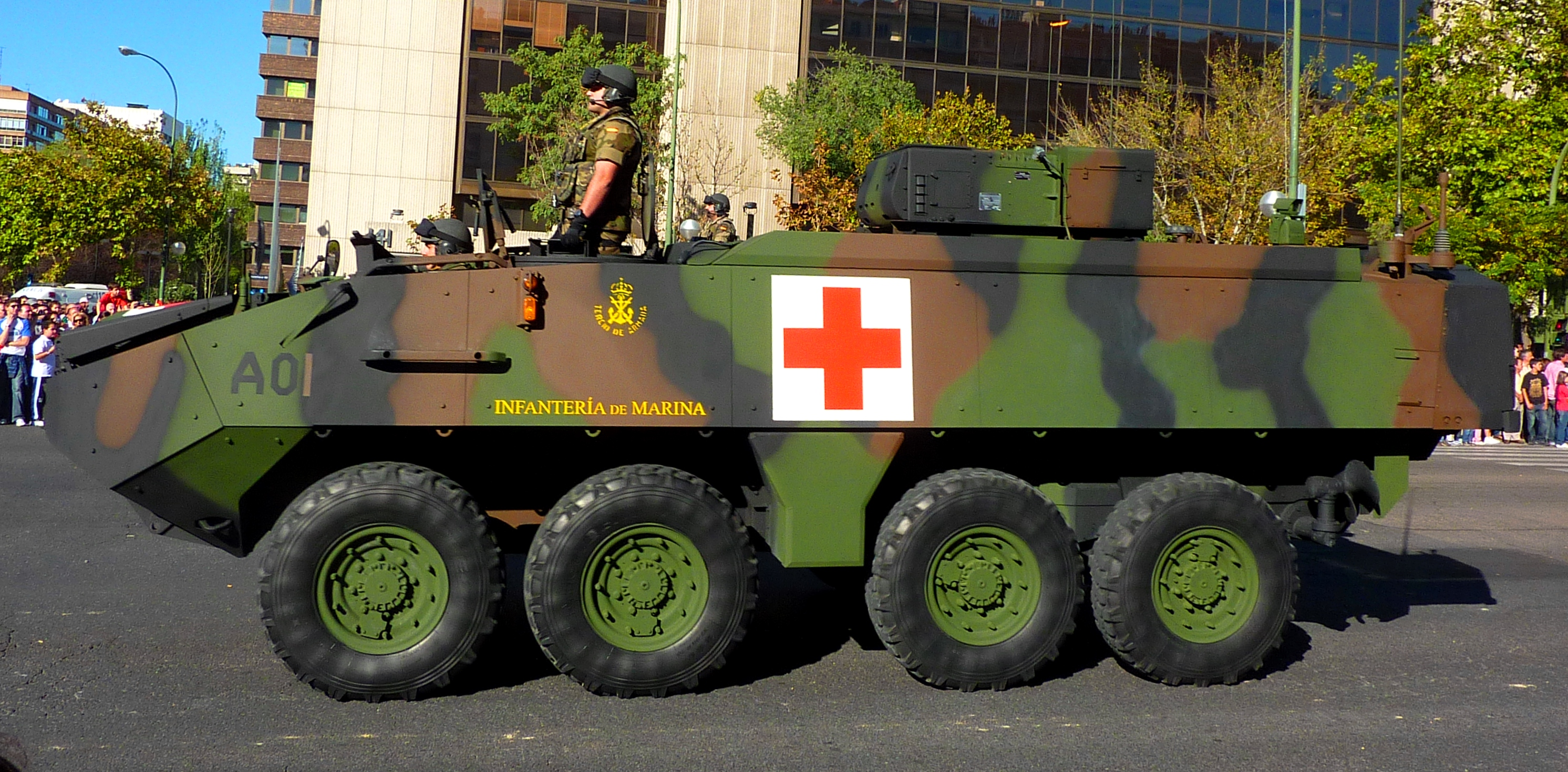
MOWAG Piranha IIIC ambulance of the Spanish Marines

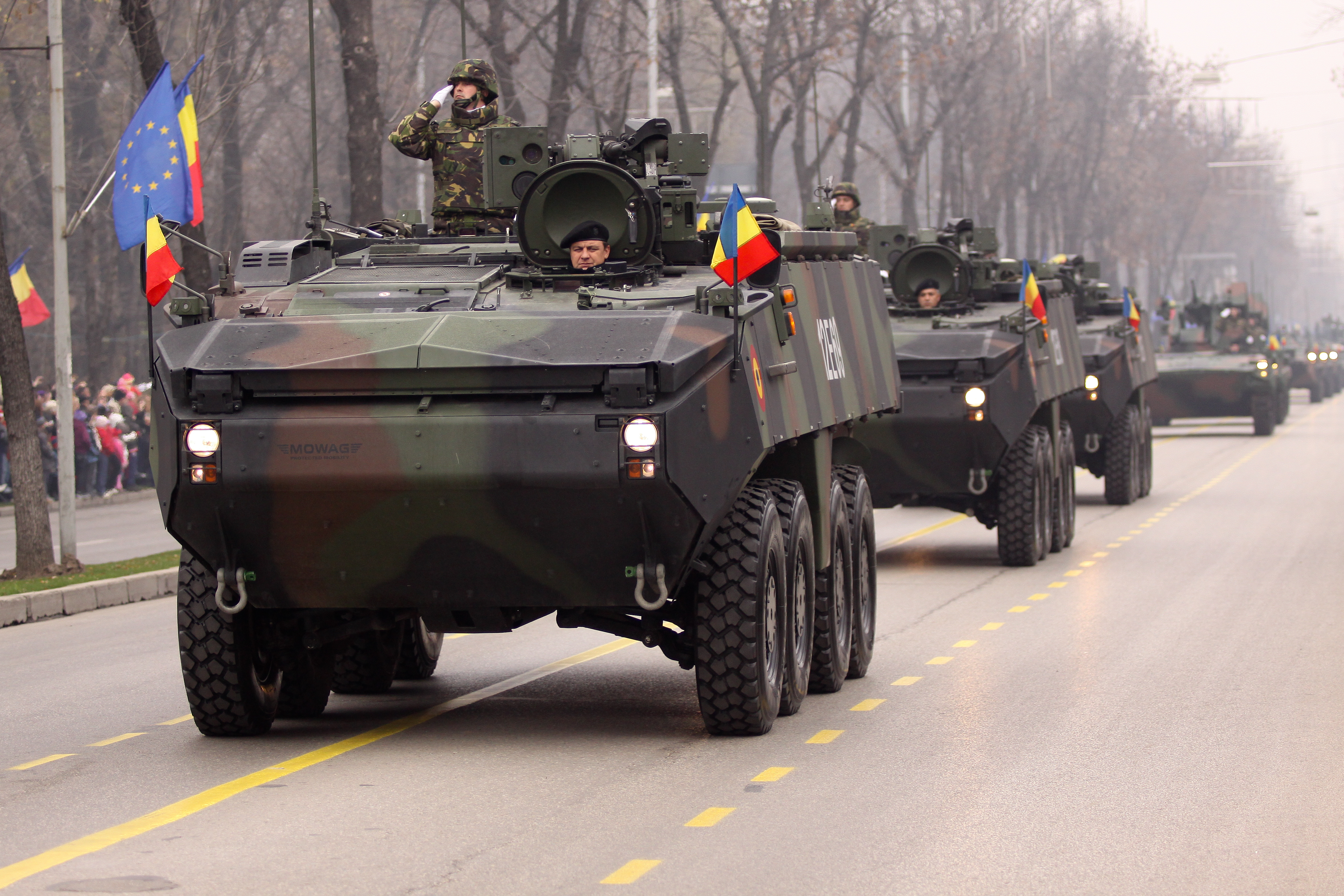
Romanian Piranha IIIC APCs during the Romanian National Day military parade in 2009

(Belgium) Belgian Army – 242 Piranha IIIC 8×8, selected in 2006, ordered in 2 batches, delivery 2008 - 2015. Variants purchased:

- 99 FUSELIER (APC)
- 32 DF30 (30mm Elbit turret)
- 18 DF90
- 24 command vehicle
- 12 Ambulance
- 17 ARV
- 18 Engineering

Botswana Defence Force – 90 Piranha III

- 45 Piranha IIIC ordered in 2002, delivered from 2003 to 2004 (APC and ambulance variants).
- 45 Piranha ordered in 2016, delivered from 2019 to 2022 (IFV variant, equipped with HITFIST turret).

(Brazil) Brazilian Marine Corps – 30 Piranha IIIC

- 25 APC
- 2 ARV
- 2 command post
- 1 ambulance

(Denmark) Danish Army – 113 Piranha III

- 22 Piranha IIIH (MTU 6V183TE22 (400 hp) diesel engine) (delivery 1999–2000, $30million)
  - 18 APC
  - 2 ARV
  - 2 command post
- 91 Piranha IIIC
  - 60 command post, reconnaissance + APC
  - C2 Command and Control variant
  - Tactical Air Control Party TACP
  - Danish Communications and Informations Systems (CIS) Piranha
  - 11 Ambulance

(Moldova) Moldovan Ground Forces – 19 Piranha IIIH, supplied by Germany (Due to Swiss veto Danish request to re-export Piranha 3 armoured vehicles to Ukraine) as overhauled former Danish Army vehicles, first 3 vehicles delivered on 11.01.2023

(Republic of Ireland) Irish Army – 80 Piranha IIIH (40 ordered in 1999, 25 in 2003, 15 ordered in 2005) (in 2019–2020, 62 Protector RWS turret were ordered for all the vehicles not initially equipped with it)

- 45 APC
- 18 Cavalry Reconnaissance Vehicle equipped with Protector RWS (12.7 mm or 40 mm grenade launcher)
- 8 command post
- 6 Medium Reconnaissance Vehicle equipped with HITFIST 30 turrets
- 2 ambulance
- 1 ARV

(Romania) Romanian Land Forces – 43 Piranha IIIC (amphibious).

- 31 APC (12.7mm RWS turret Elbit) ordered in 2006 (€37 million)
- 12 ordered in 2017 ($45 million), specialised variants (command post, ambulance, NBC reconnaissance, ARV, mortar carrier)

(Spain) Spanish Navy Marines – 39 Piranha IIIC (18 ordered in 2001, 21 ordered in 2008)

- 26 Armoured fighting vehicles (12.7 mm KMW RWS or 40 mm grenade launcher with AN/TVS-5 night vision)
- 4 IFV / Reconnaissance vehicles (Lance turret with 30mm Mauser canon)
- 4 sapper / engineering vehicles
- 2 command post
- 1 electronic warfare
- 1 ambulance
- 1 ARV

(Sweden) Swedish Amphibious Corps –13 Piranha IIIC

- 7 "LIRKA" Armoured Command Vehicle (ACV) 10×10
- 6 "KAPRIS" coastal artillery Armoured Sensor Vehicle (ASV) 10×10 with Giraffe radar
- 1 8×8 AEV prototype (armoured escort vehicle) supplied in 2002, 18 were initially planned, later cancelled.
- 1 Piranha III 8×8 Armoured Sensor Vehicle Swedish navy (artillery fire sensor)

(Switzerland) Swiss Army – 88 Piranha IIIC

- 36 Piranha IIIC "Radio Access Point Pz", ordered in 2002, in service since 2005 (12.7mm M2 Browning)
- 6 Piranha IIIC command vehicle "FHR Pz FIS/HE INTAFF", ordered in 2007, in service since 2011 (M2 Browning)
- 6 Piranha IIIC command vehicles "FHR Pz", ordered in 2002, in service since 2005 (12.7mm M2 Browning)
- 8 Piranha IIIC "Mzs Pz SE-630" (IFASS multi-use emitter), ordered in 2007, in service since 2012 (M2 Browning)
- 12 Piranha IIIC electronic warfare "KOMPAK Pz", ordered in 2007, in service since 2014
- 8 Piranha IIIC "KOMM Pz" command vehicles, ordered in 2007, in service since 2010 (M2 Browning)
- 12 Piranha IIIC CBRN "ABC Aufkl FZ" exploration in service since 2015 (Kongsberg Protector with M2 Browning)

=== Piranha IV ===
(Switzerland) Swiss Army – 164 Piranha IV on order

- 84 engineering / sapper vehicles (PI PZ 21 - "Pionier Panzerfahrzeug 21"), to be delivered from 2025
- 48 mortar carriers ("12 cm Mörser 16"), 32 to be delivered between 2024 and 2025, 16 after 2026
- 32 self-propelled howitzers (AGM Artillery Gun Module on Piranha IV 10×10). The first systems are expected to be delivered in 2030.

=== Piranha V ===
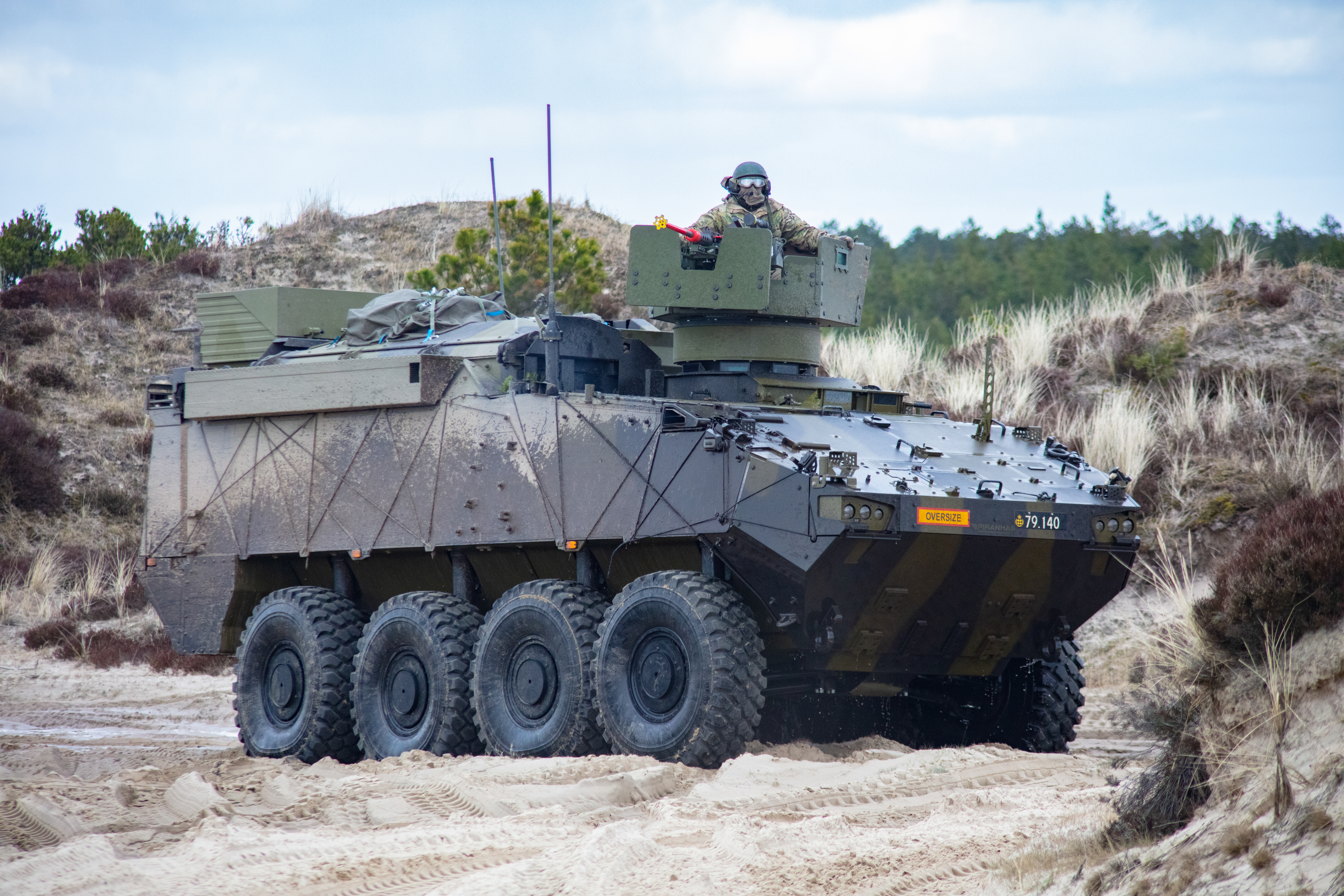
Danish Piranha V during an exercise in Oksbøl in 2023

(Denmark) Danish Army – 309 Piranha V
The first were produced in Switzerland and delivered in May 2017, and all were delivered by end 2023

- APC
- Command
- Ambulance
- Engineer
- Mortar Carriers
- Repair
- Additional order possible for a SHORAD system with the Skyranger 30

(Monaco) Monégasque Carabiniers – 2 Piranha V

- 2 Security vehicles

(Germany) German Army - 58 Piranha V ordered, 256 in total planned

(Romania) Romanian Land Forces – 227 Piranha V in production.

The first batch of 36 vehicles produced in Switzerland, arrived in October 2020. Another 58 vehicles assembled in Romania were received by the end of 2022. All other units will be produced in Romania, at the Bucharest Mechanical Factory. A further 150 Piranhas are to be acquired.

- IFV
- Command
- Ambulance
- CBRN
- Mortar
- Recovery

(Spain) Spanish Army – 348 ordered, total expected 998

- Phase 1, 348, delivery 2023–2027
  - 219 VCR (an IFV variant)
  - 58 VEC (reconnaissance)
  - 14 VCR-PC (company command post)
  - 8 VCOAV" (artillery advanced observant)
  - 39 "VCR-ZAP" (sapper / engineering, delivery started in 2022)
- Phase 2, 365 (2027–2030)
- Phase 3, 285 (2031–2035)
- 348 units on order, to be delivered by 2027. Five units were delivered in 2018 as prototypes for the VBMR program. Another seven vehicles were received in 2022. The Spanish variant is called the Dragón, and is produced by TESS Defence, an association between Santa Bárbara Sistemas, and three other companies.

=== Former operators of the Piranha family ===
Armed Forces of Liberia – 10 Piranha I 4×4. Saw service during the Second Liberian Civil War.

Sierra Leone Army – about 10 Piranha I 6×6 (Non operational)

== Derivatives of the Piranha ==
=== ASLAV (Australian Light Armoured Vehicle) ===
(Australia) Australian Army

The ASLAV is an eight-wheeled amphibious armoured reconnaissance vehicle of the LAV II family used by the Australian Army, built by GDLS Canada and GDLS Australia. Land 112 Phase 1, 15 LAV-25 leased from the USMC; Land 112 Phase 2, 113 ASLAV ordered, delivery from 1995 to 1997; Land 112 Phase 3, 144 ASLAV ordered, all delivered by 2004.

- ASLAV – 257
  - ASLAV Type I, derivative of the USMC LAV-25
    - ASLAV-25
  - ASLAV Type II, derivative of the Canadian Army Bison
    - ASLAV-PC (APC)
    - ASLAV-C (Command Post)
    - ASLAV-S (Surveillance)
    - ASLAV-A (Ambulance)
  - ASLAV Type III
    - 11 ASLAV-F (Fitter, a maintenance support vehicle)
    - 11 ASLAV-R (Recovery, an ARV)

=== LAV (Light Armoured Vehicles, made in Canada) ===
(Canada) Canadian Army

- LAV III, derived from Piranha III – 651
  - 494 Infantry Fighting Vehicle - Standard model with turret and 25 mm gun
  - 71 TOW Under Armour - Anti-tank variant equipped with two TOW missile launchers on a specialized turret
  - 39 armoured engineering vehicles
  - 47 artillery fire control
- Modernisation of 616 LAV III to standard LAV 6.0
  - 278 ISC (Infantry Section Carrier)
  - 181 CPV (Command Post)
  - 47 OPV (Observation Post Vehicle for artillery)
  - 44 ELAV (Engineer)
  - 66 RECCE (long range reconnaissance)
- LAV 6.0 ACSV – 360
  - Type 2 variants (high roof)
    - 41 Troop/Cargo Vehicle (TCV)
    - 49 Ambulance
    - 97 Command Post
    - 18 Electronic Warfare
    - 18 Engineer
  - Type 3 (low roof)
    - 13 Fitter / Cargo Vehicle (FCV)
    - 54 Maintenance and Recovery
    - 70 Mobile Repair Team
  - (note, among the 360, 39 were donated to Ukraine, and compensated by a complementary order)

(Chile) Chilean Navy

Purchased second hand from New Zealand

- LAV III, known as the NZLAV – 22
  - 22 IMV (Infantry Mobility Vehicles)

(Colombia) Colombian Army

- LAV III – 87
  - 24 APC ordered in 2012
  - 8 APC ordered in 2014
  - 55 IFV ordered in 2023 (Samson Dual RWS with a 30mm Orbital ATK Stretch)

New Zealand Army

105 LAV III purchased, with 73 remaining in service. Among the 32 not in service, 22 were sold to the Chilean Navy, 1 lost after damage in Afghanistan, 1 used in Canada as test vehicle, and 8 available for sale.

- LAV III, known as the NZLAV – 105
  - 95 IMV (Infantry Mobility Vehicles)
  - 7 LOB (standard IMV with Light Obstacle Blade)
  - 3 LAV-R (Recovery)

(Saudi Arabia) Saudi Arabian Army

- LAV 700 – 742
  - 385 LAV -700 (APC)
  - 119 LAV-700 AT (Anti Tank Missiles)
  - 119 LAV-700 FSV (Fire Support Vehicle), Cockerill-3105 105mm
  - 119 LAV-700 IFV (Infantry Fighting Vehicles), Cockerill Medium Caliber Turret (CMCT)

(Ukraine) Ukrainian Ground Forces

- LAV 6.0 – 39
  - 39 ACSV donated by the Canadian Army
  - 50 ACSV ordered by Canada, to be delivered to Ukraine, the first batch of 10 to be delivered in summer 2024, after training in Germany.

(Uruguay) Uruguayan Army

- LAV I, also known as Armoured Vehicle General Purpose, derived from Piranha I, purchased second hand – 147
  - 44 Cougar, reconnaissance and fire support vehicle
  - 98 Grizzly, an APC
  - 5 Husky, an ARV

== Retired derivatives of the Piranha family ==
(Canada) Canadian Army

- LAV I, known as the AVGP, derived from Piranha I – 344 retired of 492 acquired, 147 transferred to Uruguay.
  - 195 Cougar acquired, all retired, (reconnaissance and fire support role)
  - 265 Grizzly acquired, all retired, (APC role)
  - 26 Husky retired of 31 acquired, an ARV
  - 44 Cougar, 98 Grizzly, 5 Husky given to Uruguayan Army
- LAV II, derived from Piranha II – 402 retired / soon to be retired (2023)
  - 199 Bison (or MILAV) (18 command posts, 16 mortar carriers, 16 ARV, the rest APC)
  - 203 Coyote reconnaissance vehicles

== See also ==
=== Comparable vehicles ===
- Stryker – (United States, Canada)
- LAV III/LAV AFV/LAV-25/ASLAV – (Australia)
- K808 White Tiger – (South Korea)
- Boxer – (Germany, Netherlands)
- Freccia IFV – (Italy)
- BTR-90 – (Russia)
- CM-32 armoured vehicle – (Taiwan)
- Type 96 armored personnel carrier – (Japan)
- Type 16 maneuver combat vehicle – (Japan)
- Patria AMV – (Finland)
- BTR-4 – (Ukraine)
- Saur 1 – (Romania)
- VBCI – (France)
- KTO Rosomak – (Poland)
- FNSS Pars – (Turkey)

== Notes ==
1. Chilean built 4×4, 6×6 and 8×8 in different configurations for the Chilean Army.

== Bibliography ==
- Foss, Christopher F. Jane's Armour and Artillery 1987–88. London: Jane's Yearbooks, 1987. ISBN 0-7106-0849-7.
- Marcus Bauer, Nutzfahrzeuge der MOWAG Motorwagenfabrik AG, Fachpresse Goldach, Hudson & Company, 1996 ISBN 9783857380563
- Military Museum Full
- Ruedi Baumann: "Alles" was MOWAG schon bewegt hat – Auf Umwegen zum Welterfolg. SwissMoto. Bildpress Zuerich BPZ
