= British Para Ice Hockey Association =

The British Para Ice Hockey Association (BPIHA), formerly the British Sledge Hockey Association (BSHA), is the governing body for Para ice hockey in Great Britain. Formed in 1995, its main objectives are to expand the number of teams active in the UK (and by association the number or participants) and to develop the national team.

As of the 2015–16 season, there are five teams that compete in the BSHA League: Cardiff Huskies, Kingston Kestrels, Manchester Phoenix, Sheffield Steelkings and Peterborough Phantoms. A new team, the Endeavour Eagles is joining the league for the 2017 season, based out of Basingstoke. This new team will consist primarily of military personnel, most of whom were injured or disabled in the line of duty.

The updated league lineup as of the 2024-25 season includes the Cardiff Huskies, Manchester Mayhem, Peterborough Phantoms, Sheffield Steelkings, and Sheffield Steelstings

== Great Britain National Team ==
The BSHA oversees the GB National Sledge Hockey Team. The team currently competes in the International Paralympic Committee (IPC) Ice Sledge Hockey World Championships B Pool and hopes to qualify to attend the 2018 Winter Paralympics in South Korea.

The team roster as of 15 April 2019 was:

Netminders

- Bryan Hackworth – Sheffield Steelkings

Forwards/Defence

- Bryan Hackworth – Sheffield Steelkings
- Dean Lahan – Manchester Mayhem
- Jonathan LeGalloudec – Cardiff Huskies
- Jamie Hutchcraft – Peterborough Phantoms
- Mark Colquitt – Sheffield Steelkings
- Matt Woollias – Sheffield Steelkings
- Karl Nicholson – Manchester Mayhem
- Tyler Christopher – Cardiff Huskies
- Ashley Greening – Peterborough Phantoms
- Scotty Trigg-Turner – Peterborough Phantoms
- Marty Quinn – Peterborough Phantoms

Team Manager: Shirley Packwood

Head Coach: Ian Offers
