= Cardiff Huskies =

Wales-based ice hockey team

- City: Cardiff, Wales
- League: British Para Ice Hockey League (BPIHL)
- Founded: 1996
- Home arena: Vindico Arena (capacity: 3,088)
- Colours: Red, Yellow, Black
- Head coach: Andy Brown
- Captain: Shannon Couch
- Website: https://cardiffhuskies.com/

The Cardiff Huskies are a sledge hockey team based in Cardiff, Wales. The team was founded by Andy McNulty and David "Jamo" James in 1996. The team is believed to be the oldest sledge hockey team in the UK. The Cardiff Huskies is the only sledge hockey team in Wales. The team is part of the BSHA (British Sledge Hockey Association).

Cardiff Huskies is an inclusive mixed gender team, accepting both children & adults members. They accept people with a range of abilities, and are inclusive to those without disabilities. The Huskies is one of the main teams that help raise awareness of sledge hockey in the British Isles, as a way of getting more players and more teams created. Peterborough Phantoms is another team that advertises sledge hockey in the British Isles.

The Cardiff Huskies used to train in the Wales National Ice Rink. Demolished in 2006 to build the St. David's 2 shopping centre, and specifically the John Lewis department store, they now play and train at Ice Arena Wales, Cardiff Bay, which is also home to the Cardiff Devils.

In 2018 they won the British Para Ice Hockey League. They have also achieved league titles in the 2022, 2023 and 2024 seasons.
