= Nanuk Remotely Controlled Weapon Station =

Type of remote weapon system

Overhead Weapons Station (OWS)
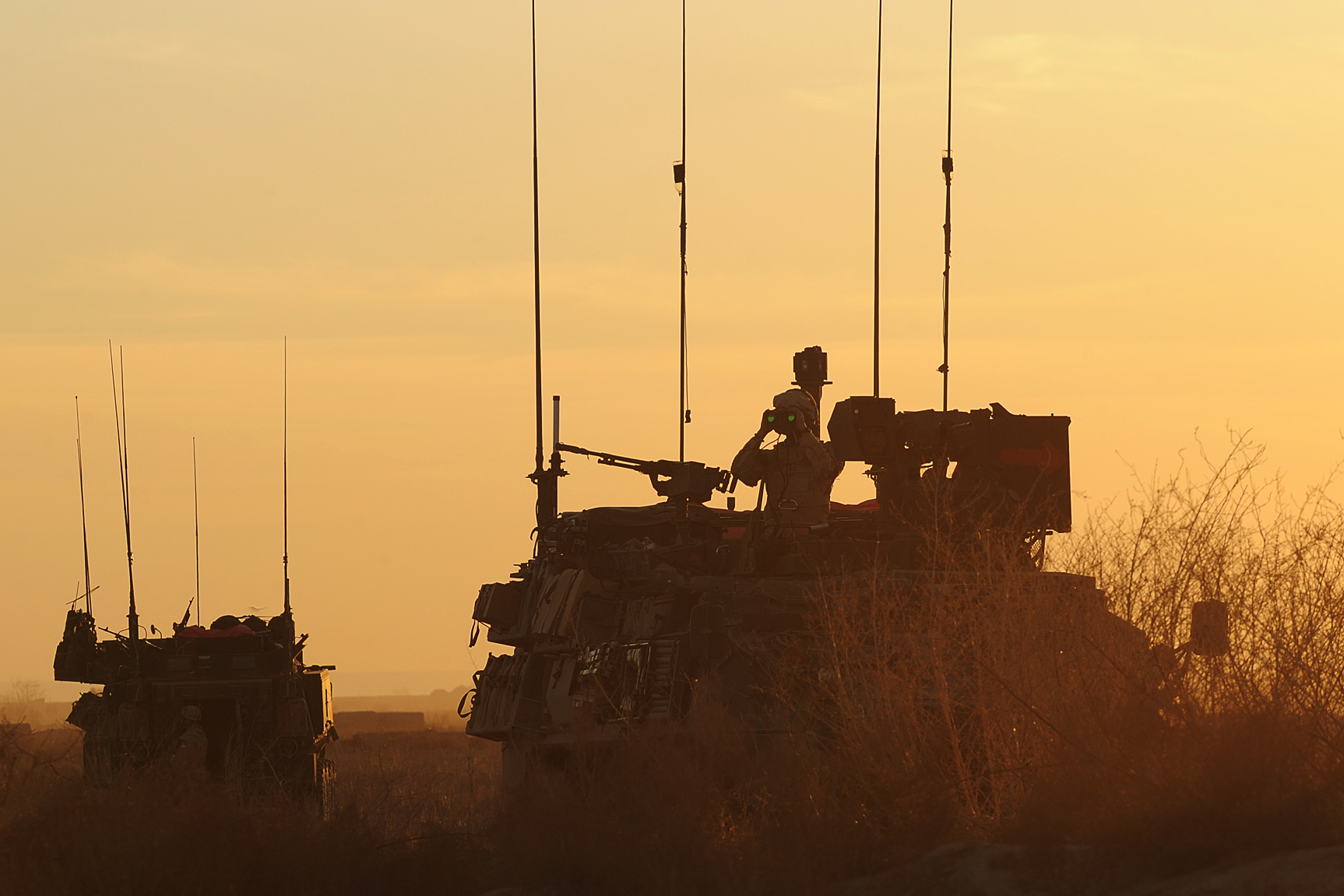
- Nanuk RCWS on top LAVs.
- Type: Remote weapon system
- Place of origin: Canada

Service history
- Used by: Canadian Forces

Production history
- Designer: Rheinmetall Defence Canada
- Manufacturer: Rheinmetall Defence Canada

Specifications
- Caliber: 5.56mm, 7.62mm, 12.7mm, 25mm, 40mm
- Elevation: -
- Traverse: 360

The Nanuk is a remote weapon station (RWS) used for light and medium calibre weapons which can be installed on any type of armoured vehicles or brown water patrol vessel. It is designed by Rheinmetall Canada, in Quebec, Canada. The word Nanuk (ᓇᓄᖅ) means "polar bear" in Inuktitut.

It is considered to be a third-generation weapon station.

== Design ==
The Nanuk is a remotely-controlled weapon station that can be integrated on various armoured vehicle platforms and used for different mission profiles. The Nanuk weapon station combines full stabilisation, long range day/night all-weather sights and a universal weapon cradle that integrates 5.56 mm, 7.62 mm and 12.7 mm weapons, and 40 mm automatic grenade launchers.

Several weapons can be mounted to the platform, such as:

- M2 12.7 mm heavy machine gun
- M240/MAG-58 7.62 mm machine gun
- M249 (Minimi) 5.56 mm machine gun
- MG 3 7.62 mm machine gun
- MG4 5.56 mm machine gun
- MK19 40 mm grenade launcher
- Heckler & Koch GMG 40 mm grenade launcher
- CRV7 70 mm folding-fin ground attack rocket
- FGM-148 Javelin anti-tank guided missile
- AGM-114 Hellfire anti-tank guided missile
