= Cadillac-Gage 1 metre turret =

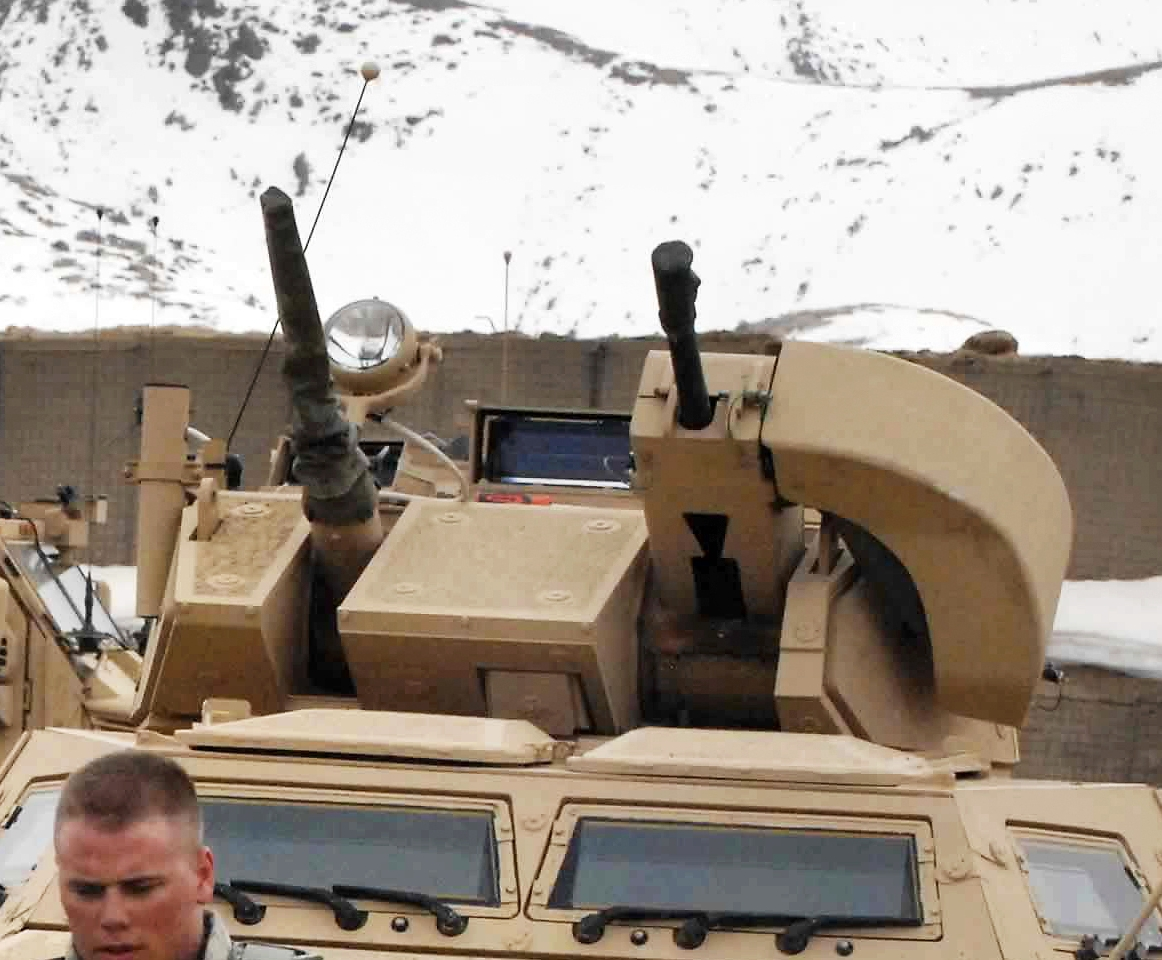
Cadillac-Gage 1 metre turret, mounting a machine gun paired with an automatic grenade launcher.

Cadillac-Gage manufactures a Cadillac-Gage 1 metre turret for armored vehicles. The turret mounts on a 1-meter turret ring. They were originally armed with a 7.62 mm machine gun, and a 12.7 mm machine gun. By 1984 a version of the turret was introduced where one of the machine guns was replaced by a Mark 19 automatic grenade launcher. The gunner is surrounded by 8 large vision blocks, and has a periscope with a telescopic sight.

One variant of the Canadian AVGP mounts this turret. When Canada made these older vehicle available to African Union peacekeeping forces in Sudan they had to seek permission from the United States Government in order to ship them with their turrets.

vehicles that have been equipped with the turret include:
| image | vehicle | notes |
|---|---|---|
| | Cadillac Gage Commando | |
| | AVGP | |
| | AAV7A1 | |
