= Huskey =

Huskey is a surname. Notable people with the surname include:

- Brian Huskey (born 1968), American actor and comedian
- Butch Huskey (born 1971), American baseball player
- Harry Huskey (1916–2017), American computer designer
- Jalen Huskey (born 2003), American football player
- Kristine A. Huskey, American lawyer
- Michael Huskey (1841–1864), Union Navy sailor and Medal of Honor recipient
- Roy Huskey, Jr. (1956–1997), American musician
- Velma Huskey (1917–1991), American computing pioneer
