= AVGP =

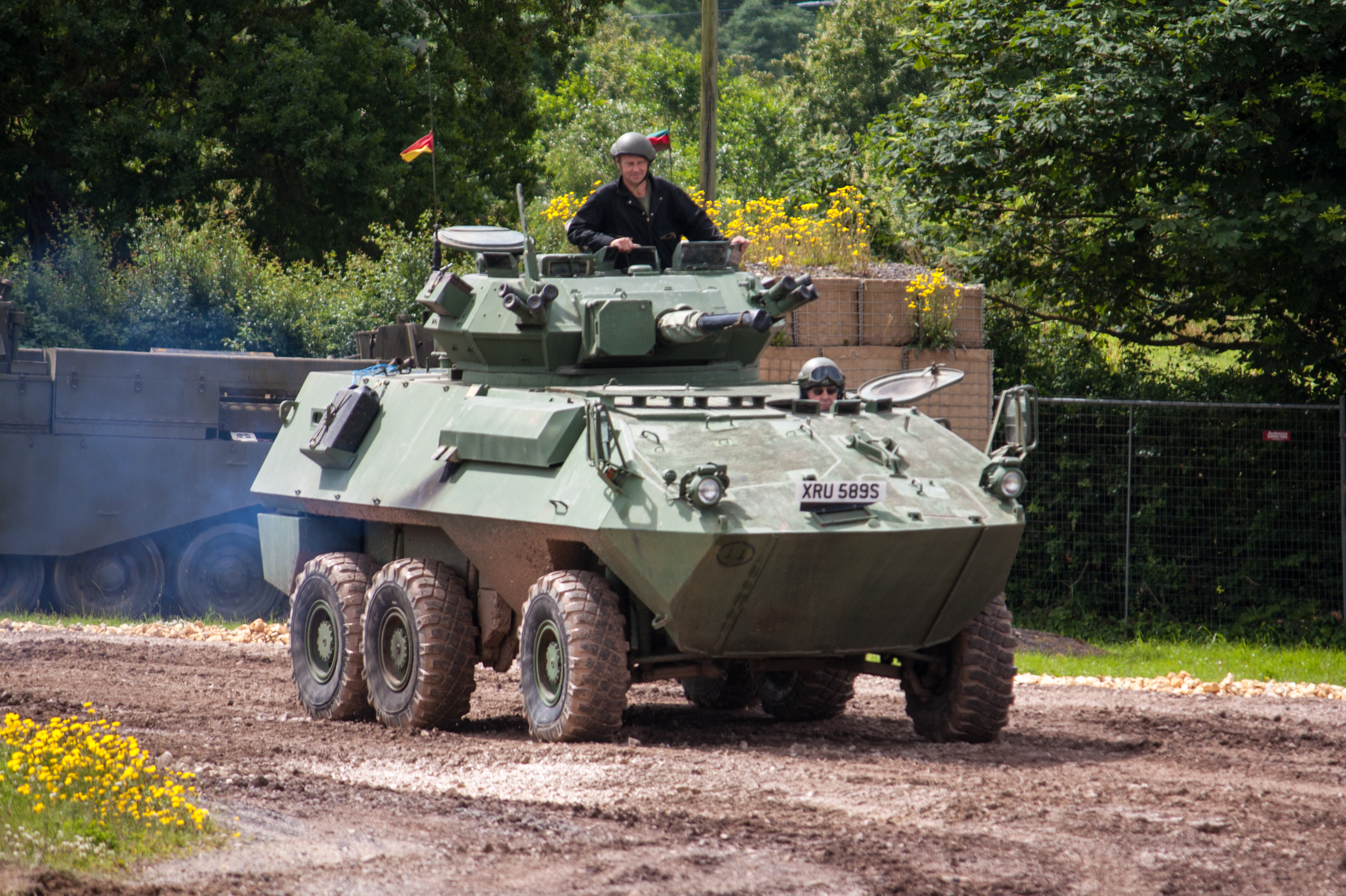
- A surplus Cougar seen in a militaria event in the UK.
- Type: Armoured fighting vehicle
- Place of origin: Canada

Service history
- In service: 1976–present
- Used by: See Operators
- Wars: Bosnian War; War in Darfur; United Nations Organization Stabilization Mission in the Democratic Republic of the Congo

Production history
- Developed from: Mowag Piranha I
- No. built: Cougar – 195; Grizzly – 274; Husky – 27
- Variants: See Variants

Specifications
- Mass: 10.7 t
- Length: 5.97 m
- Width: 2.50 m
- Crew: Cougar: 3 (Commander, gunner and driver, 2 soldiers in rear of vehicle); Husky: 2 (Driver and technician); Grizzly: Commander, gunner and driver, 6 soldiers in rear
- Main armament: Cougar: 76 mm L23A1 gun (fires HE, HESH, Smoke BE (base ejected), and Canister rounds); Grizzly: 12.7mm heavy machine gun and a 7.62 mm machine-gun (C6) and 66 mm smoke grenade launchers (2 clusters of 4 launchers); Husky: 7.62 mm machine gun (C6) and 66 mm smoke grenade launchers (2 clusters of 4 launchers)
- Secondary armament: Cougar: 7.62 mm machine gun (C5A1) and 66 mm smoke grenade launchers No 12 (2 clusters of 4 launchers)
- Engine: 275 hp Detroit Diesel 6V53T two-cycle turbo-charged diesel
- Suspension: 6×6
- Maximum speed: 100 km/h

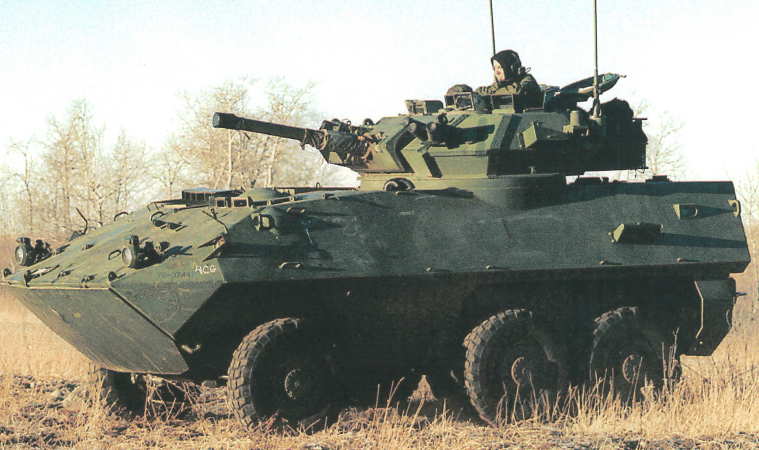
SALH Cougar at CFB Wainwright

The AVGP (Armoured Vehicle General Purpose), later known as the LAV I, is a series of three amphibious armoured fighting vehicles ordered by the Canadian military in the 1970s. The vehicles, named Grizzly, Cougar and Husky respectively, were based on the six-wheeled version of the Swiss Mowag Piranha I, and became the first generation Light Armoured Vehicle produced by General Motors Diesel (later General Dynamics Land Systems – Canada).

The AVGP program led to the development of the 8×8 LAV II, variants of which were adopted as direct replacements for the AVGP. These were the Bison and Coyote Reconnaissance Vehicle, which replaced the Grizzly and Cougar respectively.

The Canadian Army retired all AVGP variants beginning in 2005; however, a number of the retired vehicles were transferred to other militaries and police forces, where they continue in use.

== History ==
=== Canada ===
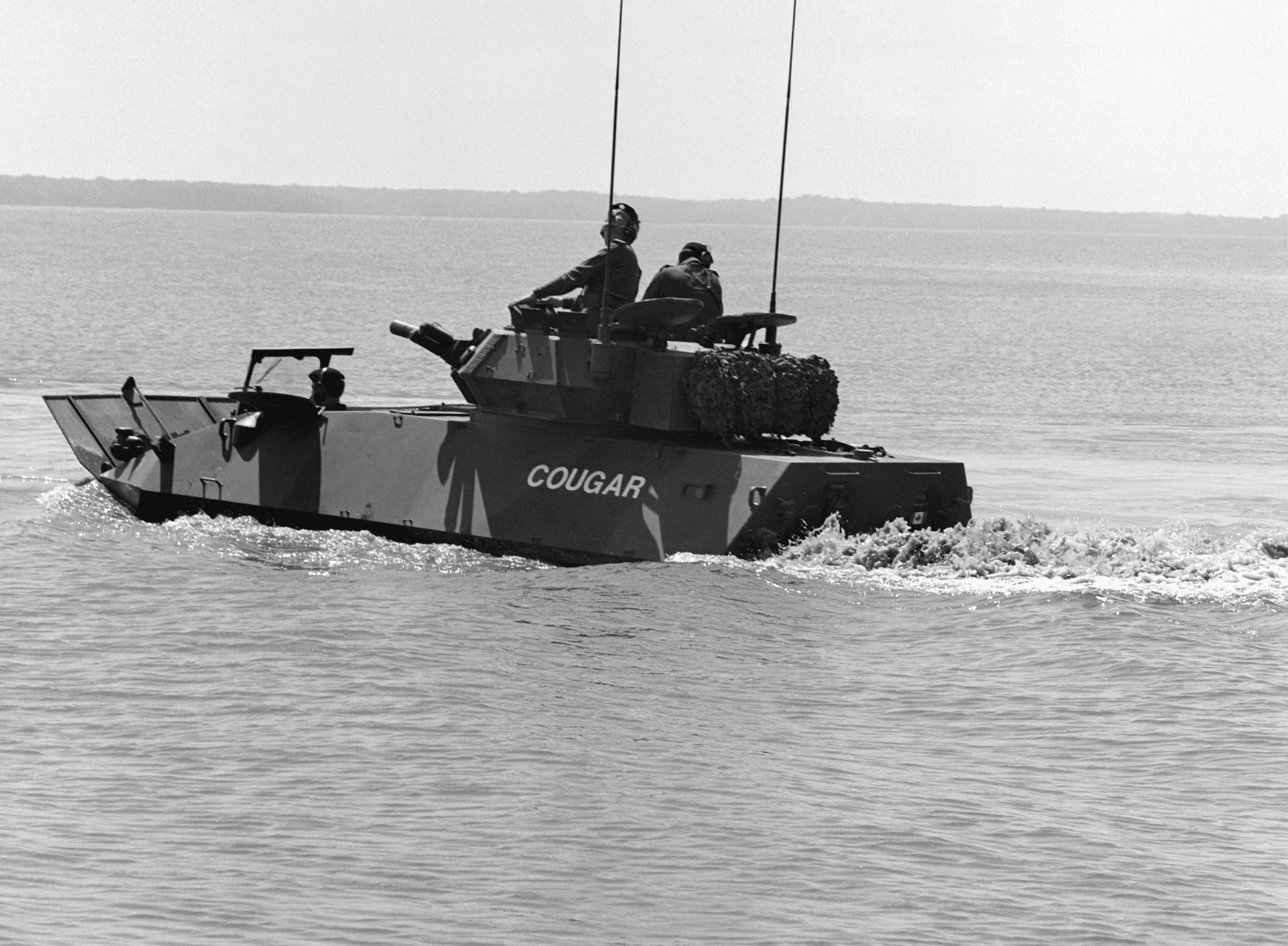
Cougar swimming

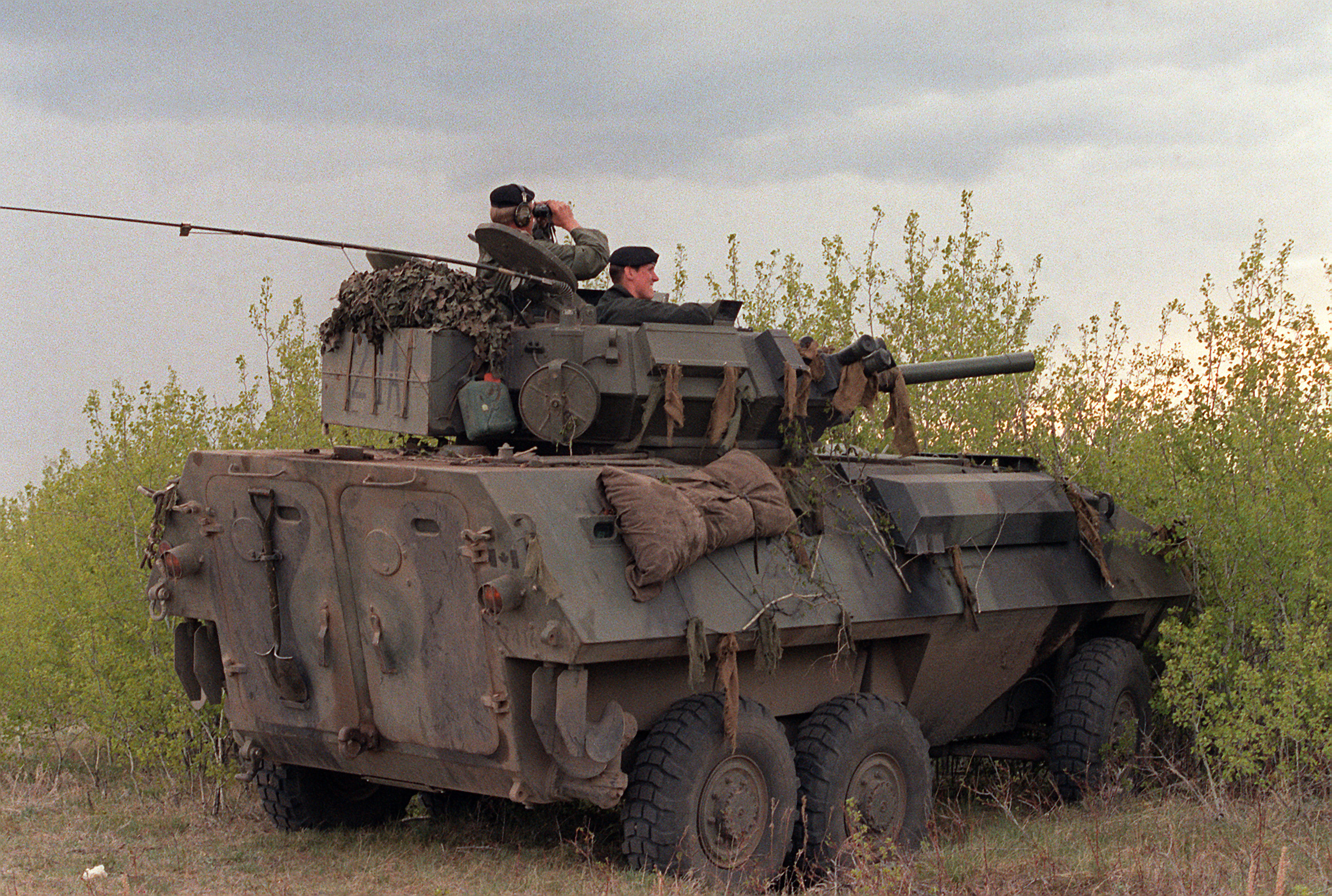
Cougar

In 1974 the Canadian military launched an acquisition program to procure a light vehicle for the Army reserve. The Army desired a flexible vehicle that could be adapted to serve in many different styles of conflict. The military drafted requirements for four different variants. Cadillac-Gage seemed primed to win this contract. The Swiss firm Mowag pitched its Piranha. Mowag partnered with General Motors Diesel to manufacture the AVGP at GM's plant in London, Ontario. In March 1976, the Piranha was selected.

The AVGP variants were introduced into Canadian service in the late 1970s.

The AVGP had propellers and trim vanes for amphibious use, like the eight-wheeled Bison, which was the vehicle family's immediate successor.

The Cougar was used for training in Canada as a reconnaissance vehicle. During the 1980s and 1990s, it was used by armoured units as a fire support vehicle, for those units not equipped with the Leopard tank.

The Grizzly was used as an armoured personnel carrier in regular force infantry battalions not equipped with the M113 APC, and also by Army reserve units. The majority of vehicles had their marine propulsion systems removed. Under the Wheeled LAV Life Extension project, the Army planned to convert Grizzly and Husky vehicles to support variants, such as Command Post and Mobile Repair Team Vehicle. However, the project was cancelled in 2005, and the vehicles retired.

The AVGP was passed on to several United Nations missions, including UNPROFOR and the mission to Somalia. One Grizzly was captured by Serb forces in the late 1990s, where it was present on a peace keeping mission.

In May 2007, the Edmonton Police Service accepted the donation of a disarmed Grizzly from the Canadian Army. In 2020 it was retired and replaced with the Quebec-made Camblie BlackWolf based on the Ford F-550.

In March 2010, the Canadian Army donated two disarmed Cougar AVGPs to the Royal Canadian Mounted Police in British Columbia for use by the Emergency Response Team. They were retrofitted to transport ERT assault teams into hazardous areas where transport in unarmoured vehicles would not be safe.

In April 2013, the Department of National Defence donated a Cougar AVGP to the Windsor Police Service in Windsor, Ontario and another to the New Glasgow Regional Police in Nova Scotia. The New Glasgow Regional Police ended use of the AVGP in 2017 with plans to donate it to another Police Service, citing difficulty in driving and lack of regular use. In 2020 the Windsor Police Service replaced their AVGP with the Ontario built Terradyne Armored Vehicles Gurkha based on the Ford F-550.

=== Use in Africa ===
In June 2005, the Canadian government announced plans to loan 105 AVGPs (100 Grizzlys and 5 Huskys) to African peacekeepers in the Darfur region of Sudan. The AVGP was considered sufficiently modern to be useful in this low-intensity conflict. Canada planned to arrange for civilian contractors to maintain these vehicles. As the vehicles contained some U.S.-manufactured or licensed parts, U.S. permission would be required to loan the vehicles. Initially, the vehicles were to be shipped without their Cadillac-Gage turrets. The vehicles arrived in Senegal in the late summer of 2005.

The Sudanese government required various kinds of assurances before they would allow peacekeepers to use the vehicles in Sudan. On November 18, 2005, the vehicles started arriving in Sudan, in white livery, with their turrets. The loan of vehicles for peace-keeping service in Sudan was originally for one year.

However, the loan was extended, and transferred from the African Union to the United Nations. According to Amnesty International, the soldiers who used the loaned vehicles served in Sudan for too short a term to be properly trained and become experienced. One of the vehicles was destroyed by a rocket-propelled grenade. A second vehicle was damaged when it rammed a more heavily armed, but unarmoured Technical vehicle.

=== Uruguay ===
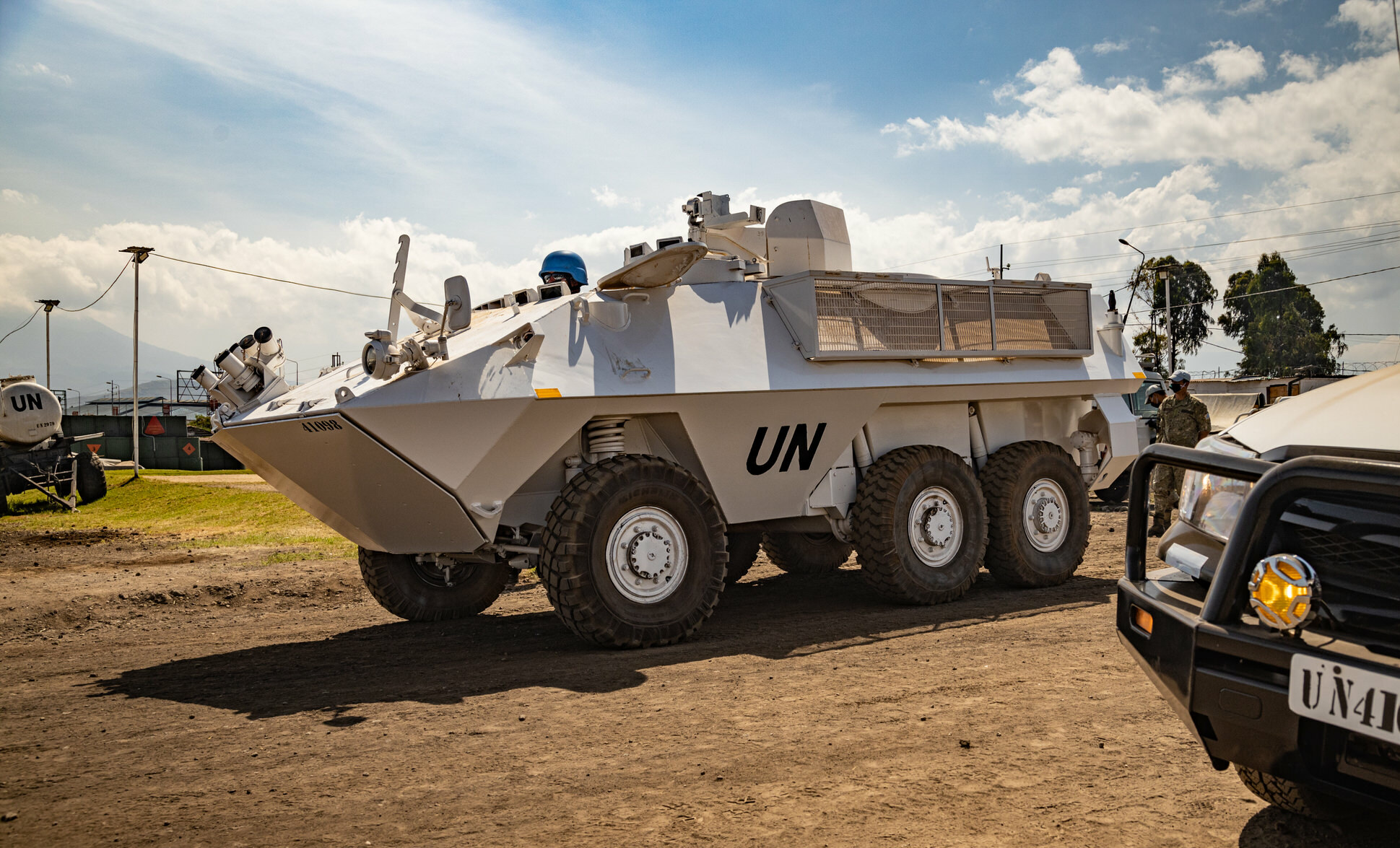
Turretless Cougar serving with the Uruguayan contingent of MONUSCO in Goma, June 2020

In 2008, the Uruguayan Army bought 44 surplus Cougars from the Canadian Army. They were rebuilt without the turret by the Chilean MOWAG-Piranha builder FAMAE, as they will act as armoured personnel carriers for the UN deployment in the Republic of Congo (MONUC), and domestically.

In 2009, Uruguay bought 98 Grizzlys and 5 Huskys that were on loan with the AMIS/UNAMID mission in Darfur. It was reported that FAMAE was contracted in 2011 to modernize the vehicles by installing new engines and gearboxes, as well as performing preventive maintenance.

== Variants ==
Variants of the 491 AVGP manufactured are:

=== Cougar (195) ===
- Used as a tank trainer, reconnaissance and fire support vehicle
- Three-man crew
- Turret of a British FV101 Scorpion reconnaissance vehicle (76mm main gun)

=== Grizzly (274) ===
- Armoured personnel carrier (APC)
- Three-man crew
- Designed to carry a section of infantry
- Mounting a Cadillac-Gage 1 metre turret, armed with a .50 BMG and a 7.62 mm machine gun

=== Husky (31) ===
- Armoured recovery vehicle (ARV)
- Two-man crew
- Designed to provide mechanical support for the other two vehicles

== Operators ==
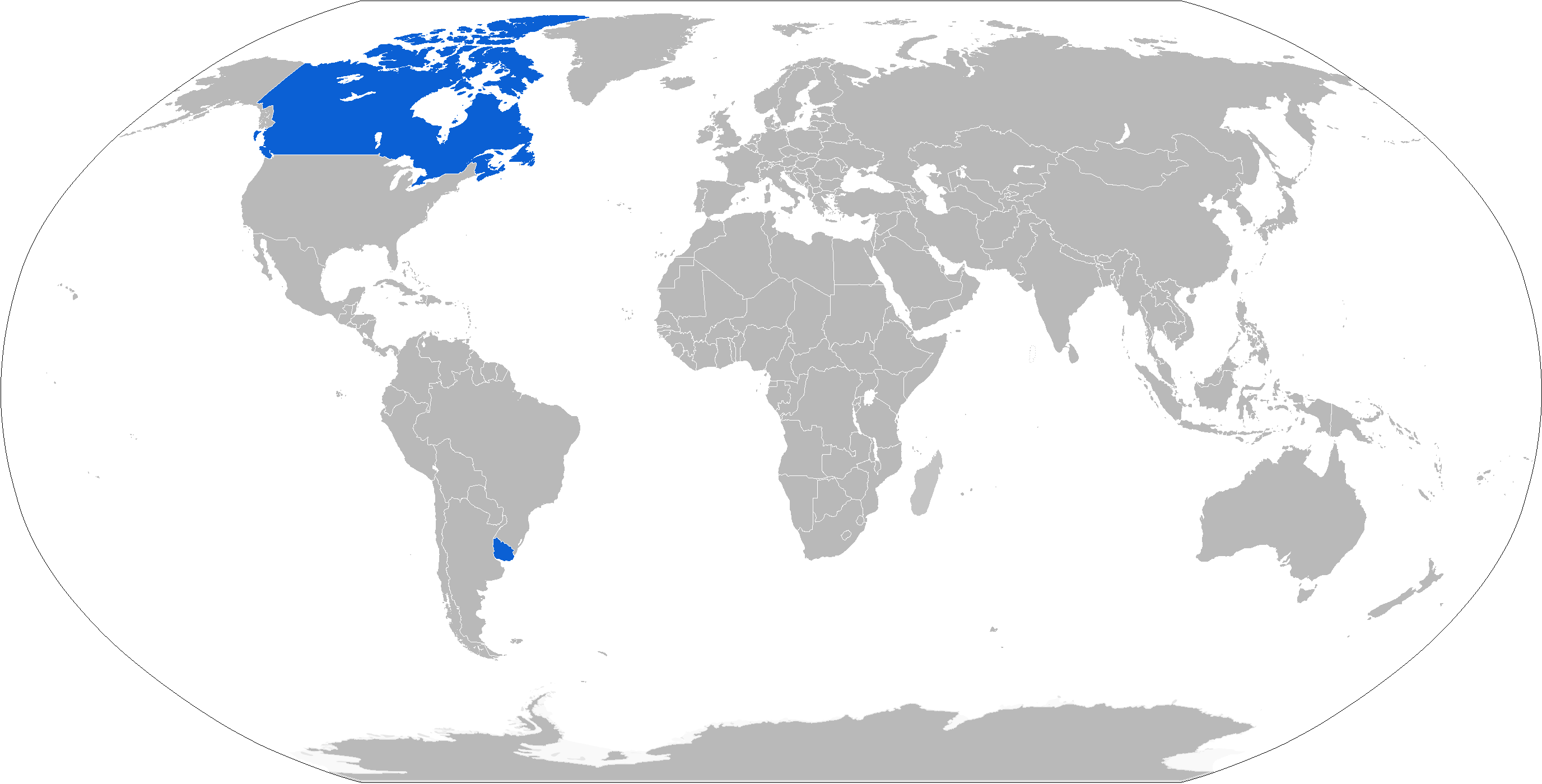
Map of AVGP operators in blue

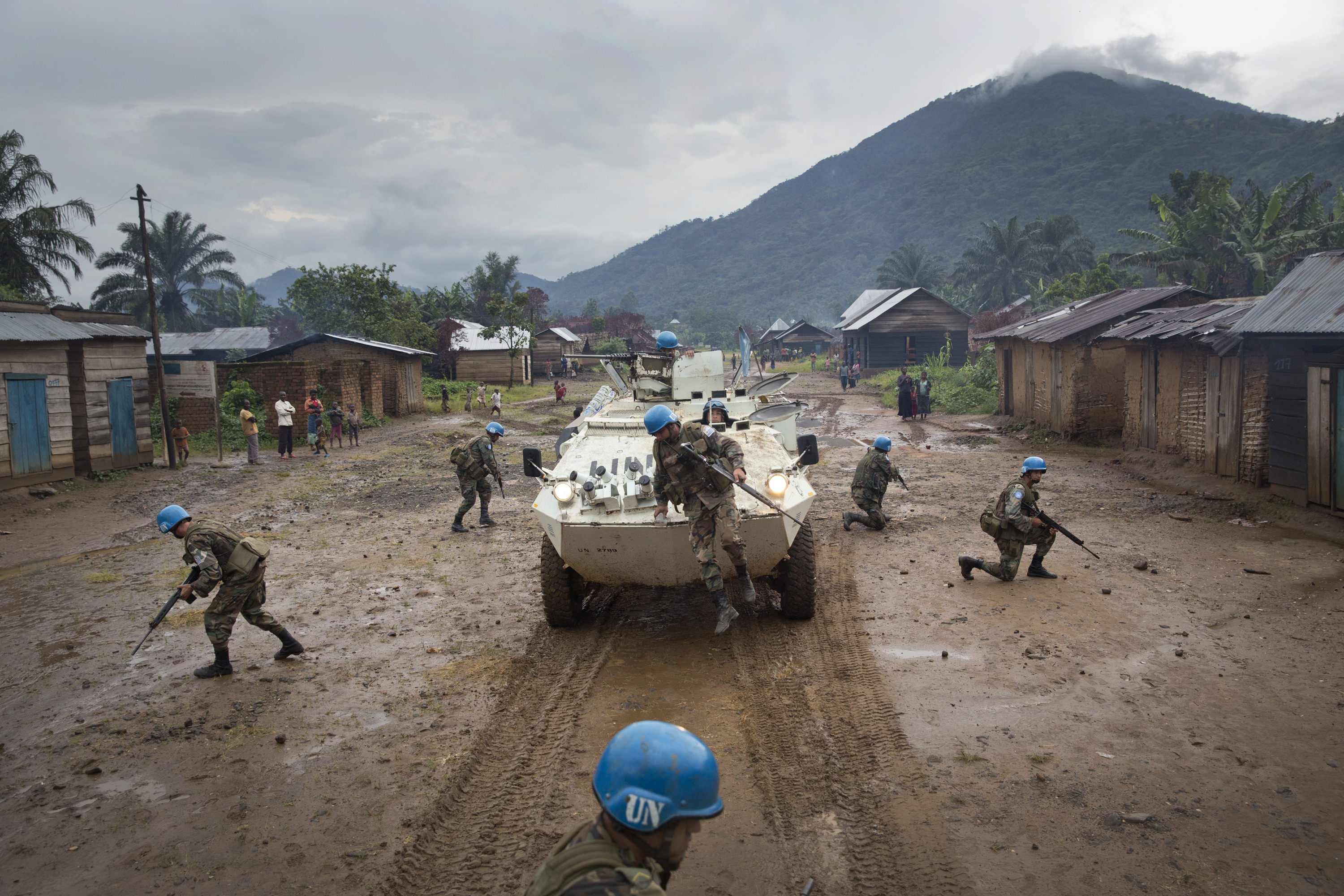
Turretless Cougar serving with the Uruguayan contingent of MONUSCO, in Nord-Kivu, December 2013.

=== Historical operators ===
- Canada (Canadian Army) – AVGPs were used by Regular and Reserve units, the Cougar in armoured regiments and the Grizzly in mechanized infantry battalions.
  - The Edmonton Police Service received one disarmed Grizzly in 2007. They replaced it in 2020 with a Cambli BlackWolf Armored Vehicle.
  - The New Glasgow Regional Police received one disarmed Grizzly in 2013, but ended use around 2017 with plans to donate it to another Police Service.
  - The Windsor Police Service received one disarmed Cougar in 2013 and replaced it in 2020 with a Terradyne Armored Vehicles Gurkha.
- Serbia – at least one Canadian Grizzly serving in the former Yugoslavia was captured by Serbian forces and had been photographed in the service of Jedinica za Specijalne Operacije (JSO, Unit for Special Operations) or Crvene Beretke (Red Berets), a unit of the Serbian police.

=== Current operators ===
- Canada – (Royal Canadian Mounted Police) – as the Tav 2 variant (Cougars modified for ERT tasks), these were given for free by the Canadian Army to the RCMP in British Columbia in March 2010.
- Uruguay – 44 refurbished Cougars with turrets removed. 98 Grizzlys and 5 Huskys given directly from the AMIS/UNAMID mission in Sudan.

=== Others ===
- African Union (AMIS mission) – 100 (−1 lost in combat) Grizzlys, 5 Huskys

== On Display ==
- Canadian Tank Museum - Oshawa, Ontario

== See also ==
- MOWAG Piranha – (Switzerland)
- Pindad Panser – (Indonesia)
