= Husqvarna =

Husqvarna (pronounced [ˈhʉ̂ːsˌkvɑːɳa]) may refer to:

== Companies ==
- Husqvarna Vapenfabrik, a now-defunct Swedish firearms manufacturing company founded in 1689
- Husqvarna Group, a manufacturer of outdoor power products
- Husqvarna Motorcycles, a motocross, enduro and supermoto motorcycle manufacturer
- Husqvarna Sewing Machines, now VSM Group
- Husqvarna, the brand name for home appliances manufactured by Electrolux

== Sports ==
- Husqvarna IF, a Swedish sports club
- Husqvarna FF, a football club sponsored by the Husqvarna Group

== See also ==
- Huskvarna, a Swedish city, the original location of the company
