= LAV 6 =

Canadian Infantry Fighting Vehicle

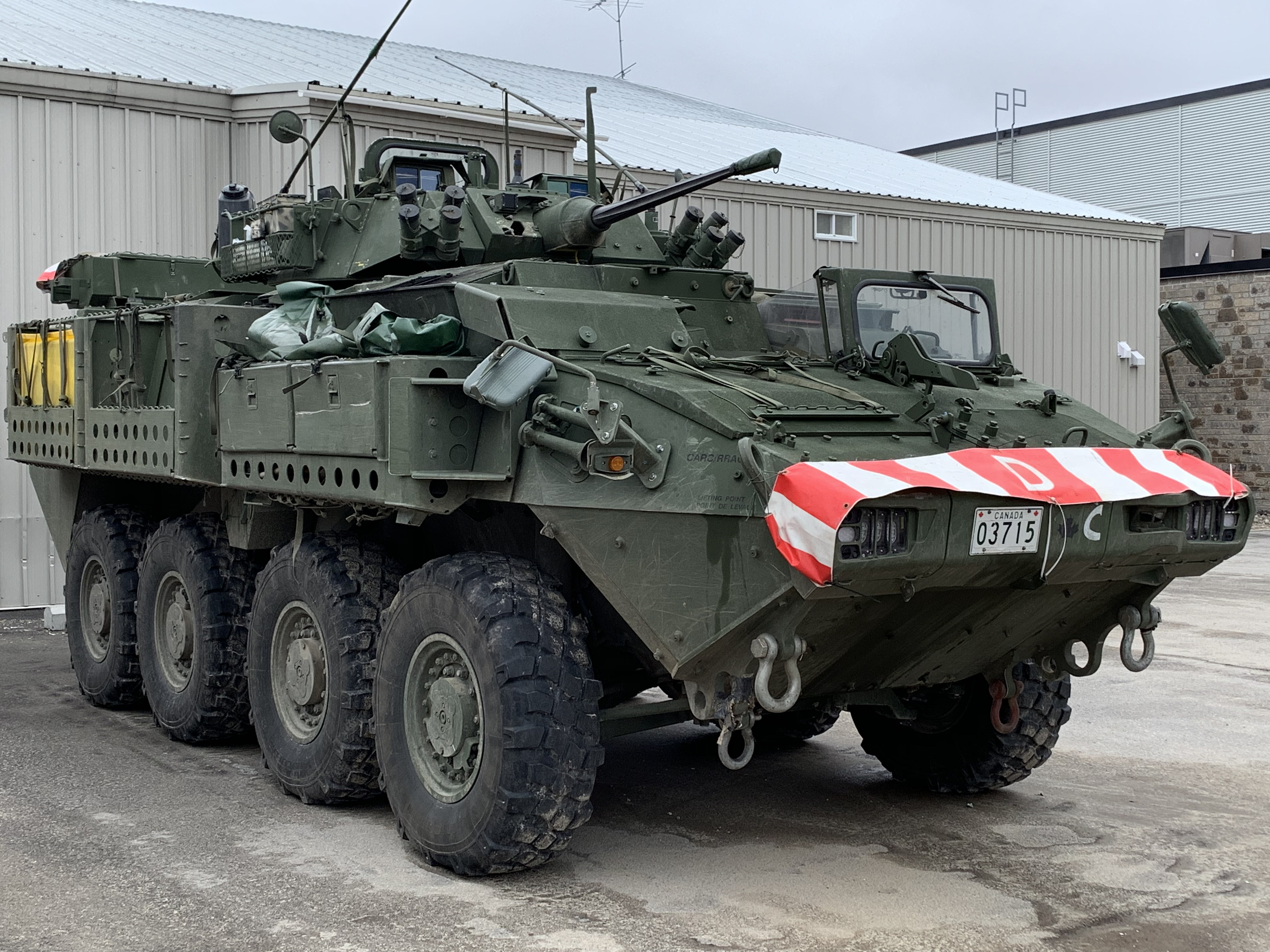
- Canadian LAV 6 at Saint-André-Avelin, April 2019.
- Type: Infantry Fighting Vehicle
- Place of origin: Canada

Service history
- In service: 2016–present
- Used by: See Operators

Production history
- Designer: General Dynamics Land Systems - Canada
- Designed: 2009–2011
- Manufacturer: General Dynamics Land Systems - Canada, General Dynamics Mission Systems - Canada
- Developed from: LAV III
- Developed into: LAV 700 Desert Viper
- Produced: 2012–2019 (LAV 6), 2020–present (ACSV)
- Variants: See Variants

Specifications
- Mass: Basic: 20,638 kilograms (20.638 tonnes), Add-on Armour: 28,576 kilograms (28.576 tonnes)
- Length: 7.827 metres (25 ft 8.1 in)
- Width: 3.250 metres (10 ft 8.0 in)
- Height: 3.266 metres (10 ft 8.6 in)
- Crew: 3
- Passengers: 8
- Main armament: 1 x M242 Bushmaster 25 mm chain gun (210rnds) or 1 x RWS C6 GPMG 7.62 mm machine gun (2,200rnds)
- Secondary armament: C6 GPMG
- Engine: Caterpillar C9 Turbo-charged six-cylinder Diesel; 450 hp
- Power/weight: 15.7 hp/t
- Suspension: Independent Hydropneumatic
- Fuel capacity: 414 litres (91 imperial gallons; 109 US gallons)
- Operational range: Road: 600 km (370 mi); Cross country: 450 km (280 mi)
- Maximum speed: 100 km/h (62 mph), Offroad: 40 km/h (25 mph)

The LAV 6, sometimes written as LAV 6.0 or LAV VI, is the fourth generation of the Light Armoured Vehicle (LAV) family of armored personnel carriers, and is based on the LAV III. The first LAV 6s were delivered in 2013 and entered service in 2016 following a period of testing. The Canadian Army plans to replace its entire LAV fleet of various LAV II and LAV III variants with the LAV 6. The vehicle is being acquired in two main variants: a fighting vehicle equipped with the 25mm cannon seen on the LAV II and LAV III, and a support variant labelled the Armoured Combat Support Vehicle (ACSV).

== History ==
In July 2009, the Canadian Department of National Defence announced that $5 billion would be spent to enhance, replace and repair the Canadian Army's armoured vehicles. Part of the spending would be used to replace and repair damaged LAV III's due to wear and tear from operations in Afghanistan. As many as one third of the Army's light armoured vehicles were out of service. The LAV III's would be upgraded with improved protection and automotive components.

The Canadian Army lost over 34 vehicles and 359 were damaged during the mission in Afghanistan. The Canadian Army lost 13 LAVs and more than 159 were damaged by roadside bombs or enemy fire. Of the $5 billion announced, approximately 20% of it was intended to be used to upgrade LAV III models. The upgrade extended the LAV III life span to 2035. The remaining $4 billion was to be spent on a "new family of land combat vehicles".

The Department of National Defence considered the purchase of a Close Combat Vehicle, meant to accompany the Leopard 2 and to support the LAV III in combat. The CV90, the Puma (IFV) and the Véhicule blindé de combat d'infanterie were the most likely candidates for the role. A contract of 108 with an option for up to 30 more was considered. The success of the upgrade program and budget pressures led to the cancellation of the Close Combat Vehicle replacement program.

In October 2011, the Canadian government announced a $1.1 billion contract to General Dynamics Land Systems to upgrade 550 LAV III combat vehicles. The government said the upgrade was needed to improve protection against mines and improvised explosive devices (IEDs), which have been the cause of a number of Canadian deaths in Afghanistan. The improvements will also extend the service of the vehicles up to 2035 and will boost troop mobility.

The upgrades include a new and more powerful engine, increased armour protection, and improved steering and brake systems. The turret hatches on the LAV III would be made larger and fire control, thermal, day and low-light sights, and data displays would be improved. The weight of the vehicle would increase from 38,000 pounds (17,000 kg) to 55,000 pounds (25,000 kg).

In September 2012, the original contract valued at $1.064 billion to upgrade the 550 LAV III variants (infantry section carrier, command post, observation post and engineer vehicle) to the LAV 6 configuration was modified. The modification added $151 million to upgrade an additional 66 LAV III's to the LAV 6 with a LAV Reconnaissance and Surveillance System (LRSS) fitted.

In February 2017, GDLS – Canada was awarded a $404 million order to work on 141 LAV Operational Requirement Integration Task (LORIT) vehicles. This contract will upgrade the remaining LAV III fleet in the Canadian Army to the LAV 6 configuration. This brings the Canadian Army's LAV III Upgrade (LAVUP) program to a total cost of $1.8 billion.

Final completion and delivery of the Canadian Army's LAV III Upgrade (LAVUP) to upgrade the LAV III to the LAV 6 was expected to be completed by December 2019.

=== Exports ===
In early 2014 the Conservative government under Stephen Harper prepared the sale of several hundred LAV 6 vehicles to Saudi Arabia for an estimated CAD $10 billion. This was one of the largest manufacturing export deals in modern Canadian history, though it was heavily criticized due to Saudi Arabia's record on human rights abuses and involving in the Yemeni Civil War. The deal, which grew to CAD $15 billion and included 928 LAV 6 vehicles, was ultimately signed in late 2014. The Liberal government under Justin Trudeau finally approved the export license for the vehicles after coming to power in 2015, despite widespread calls from the NDP and human rights groups to cancel the deal. Even after footage appearing online of Canadian LAV vehicles being deployed against the Shiite population in Qatif, the House of Commons committee report found "no conclusive evidence that Canadian-made vehicles were used in human rights violations" according to Finance Minister Chrystia Freeland. The government also cited costly penalties for breaking the contract as a reason to honor the export commitments. In 2018, Saudi Arabia threatened to reduce its order for LAV 6 vehicles from 928 to only 742 vehicles, after a diplomatic row with the Trudeau government following criticism of the former's human rights abuses, although some analysts believed this threat had more to do with the kingdom's economic difficulties.

Following the 2022 Russian invasion of Ukraine, the Canadian Government announced that it would be diverting 39 LAV 6 ACSVs to the Ukrainian Armed Forces as military aid from the order of 360 vehicles it had previously made for the Canadian Army. Canadian officials stated that the vehicles along with spare parts would be delivered during the summer of 2022 and that the Army would still receive a total order of 360 vehicles in addition to the 39 vehicles given to Ukraine.

In July 2026, the Government of Canada announced the acquisition of a further 190 ACSVs from GDLS-Canada, which would bring the Canadian Army's total ACSV fleet to 550 vehicles.

=== Active combat ===
In early January 2023 the first ACSVs were spotted near the frontlines in Ukraine, after having begun to arrive since early October 2022, with the vehicles previously having been in rear-area units for training on the vehicles. Ukrainian Media reporting on the vehicles also dubbed the vehicles with a new nickname, the “Super Bison” due to the lineage the ACSV series shares with the older LAV 2 Bison series which filled an almost identical role. As of June 2025, two Super Bisons been confirmed by open source intelligence as destroyed in combat.

== Variants ==
=== LAV 6 series ===
- LAV III UP (Upgraded) - The original prototype(s) that took the LAV III and modified it heavily under the Light armoured vehicle III upgrade (LAVUP) program into what eventually became the LAV 6 ISC.
- LAV 6 ISC (Infantry Section Carrier) - The basic IFV variant fitted with a turret and armed with a M242 Bushmaster, a coaxial C6 GPMG, and a roof mount for another C6 GPMG or C9A2.
- LAV 6 CP (Command Post) - The mobile tactical command variant which lacks a turret and instead has a raised roofline on the rear half of the hull. Armed with a C6 GPMG on a RWS (Remote Weapon Station).
- LAV 6 CE (Combat Engineering) - The engineering variant fitted with a hydraulic reel at the rear of the vehicle and a dozer blade at the front of the vehicle. It also lacks the turret of the ISC variant and is instead fitted occasionally with the RWS (Remote Weapon Station) armed with a C6 GPMG.
- LAV 6 Recce (Reconnaissance Vehicle) - A reconnaissance variant meant to partially replace the Coyote in the recce role. Unlike the OPV variant the vehicle is almost identical to the ISC variant, just with the addition of equipment for the recce role.
- LAV 6 OPV (Observation Post Vehicle) - A forward observer/reconnaissance variant meant to partially replace the Coyote in the recce role. The vehicle is similar to the Recce variant but has a surveillance suite mounted on a retractable mast that can extend up to 5 m when moving and 10 m when stationary.
- LAV 6 SHORAD (Short-Range Air Defence) - A concept vehicle designed to meet the Canadian Army's air defense requirement, first displayed at CANSEC defence exhibition in 2018. The vehicle is armed with a roof mounted SAM launcher with 3 tubes fitted to the left side of the vehicle, overtop of the troop compartment. The vehicle lacked any form of RWS (Remote Weapon Station) for protection.
- LAV 6 CRV (Combat Reconnaissance Vehicle) - A prototype vehicle designed for the Australian Army's Land 400 requirement for a wheeled combat reconnaissance vehicle. The vehicle is fitted with an unmanned MCT-30 turret and a CROWS. The vehicle was unsuccessful in the competition with the Boxer CRV being chosen instead.

=== LAV 6 ACSV (Armoured Combat Support Vehicle) ===
This series was initially known as the LAV 6 CSV, and include the following variants:

- ACSV TCV (Troop/Cargo Vehicle) - A basic APC variant that replaces the Bison as a general purpose armoured personnel carrier which can also double as a logistics carrier depending on operational requirements. The vehicle is fitted with a Protector RWS (Remote Weapon Station) armed with C6 GPMG; although it can also potentially mount a C16 CASW or a M2HB QCB.
- ACSV AA (Armoured Ambulance) - A field ambulance variant meant for transporting wounded personnel, replacing the older MTVA and M113A3 Ambulance along with the Bison Ambulance.
- ACSV CP (Command Post) - A command variant that replaces the older Bison CP and M577A3 CP vehicles.
- ACSV MRT (Mobile Repair Team) - Replacing the older M113A3 MRT, the vehicle is fitted with both a winch and a crane, which are used for repairing and assisting with the recovery of LAVs in the field.
- ACSV FCV (Fitter/Cargo Vehicle) - Replacing the older MTVF, the vehicle is fitted with a crane to repair vehicles in the field.
- ACSV EV (Engineering Vehicle) - An engineer variant that is fitted with a hydraulic dozer blade. This variant also replaces the older MTVE.
- ACSV EW (Electronic Warfare) - This variant is similar to the TCV variant but has an electronic warfare suite fitted in the rear of the vehicle. This vehicle replaces the Bisons that had been converted for electronic warfare.
- ACSV MRV (Maintenance and Recovery Vehicle) - The recovery vehicle variant is fitted with a hydraulic dozer blade, a crane, two stabilizing support legs, and a Protector RWS (Remote Weapon Station) armed with C6 GPMG; although it can also potentially mount a C16 CASW or a M2HB QCB. This variant replaces the older MTVR.

=== LAV 6.0 Mk2 ===
The vehicle was presented in May 2025 during CANSEC 2025, a defence exhibition in Ottawa. It has a new turret equipped with a 30mm Mk44 Bushmaster II, loitering munitions and two TOW ATGM launchers mounted on either side.

== Design ==
In August 2019, the Government of Canada announced its intention to purchase up to 360 Armoured Combat Support Vehicles (ACSVs), and that negotiations with GDLS - Canada had entered the final stages. Based heavily on the LAV 6 platform, the ACSVs will replace the Bison LAV and the M113 armoured personnel carrier (M113A3 & MTVL) fleets of the Canadian Armed Forces.

In September 2019, Public Services and Procurement Canada on behalf of the Department of National Defence awarded GDLS - Canada a CAD$2 billion contract for 360 ACSVs, initial spare parts, manuals, training, and various vehicle add-on kits. The various add-on kits incorporated in the procurement include: add-on armour, mine blast and enhanced crew protection, laser warning systems, side protection and remote weapons station kits. The Department of National Defence stated that by procuring similar combat support vehicles in the CAF fleet offers the advantages of reduced training and sustainment costs, in addition to the availability of standard spare parts to fix vehicles quickly during critical operations.

The vehicles are expected to support a wide range of operations, including domestic disaster relief and overseas peacekeeping missions. The ACSV will be available in eight variants to provide services such as: ambulances, vehicle recovery, engineering, mobile repair, electronic warfare, troop-carrying, and mobile command posts. Delivery of the first set of vehicles is expected in late 2020, with the last vehicles being delivered in 2025.

In May 2020, Kongsberg Defence & Aerospace announced that they had signed a contract worth NOK500 Million (CAD$73.6 Million) with GDLS - Canada for delivery of the newest generation of Protector Remote Weapons Stations (or RWS) to the Canadian Army. The Protector RWS is to be equipped on Canada's fleet of ACSVs. It was subsequently announced on June 1, 2020, that delivery of the first ACSVs was still on schedule for late 2020 and would not be delayed in spite of the COVID-19 pandemic.

== Operators ==
=== Current operators ===
Canada (Canadian Army) – 1,166
Variants purchased by the Canadian Army.
- Batch 1: 616 LAV 6.0 IFV (Upgraded LAV III)
  - 278 ISC (Infantry Section Carrier)
  - 181 CPV (Command Post Vehicle)
  - 47 OPV (Observation Post Vehicle)
  - 44 CEV (Combat Engineer Vehicle)
  - 66 RECCE (Reconnaissance)
- Batch 2: 360 LAV 6.0 ACSV – (deliveries ongoing)
  - Type 2 (High Roof)
    - 41 TCV (Troop/Cargo Vehicle)
    - 49 AAV (Armoured Ambulance Vehicle)
    - 97 CPV (Command Post Vehicle)
    - 18 EWV (Electronic Warfare Vehicle)
    - 18 EV (Engineer Vehicle)
  - Type 3 (Low Roof)
    - 13 FCV (Fitter/Cargo Vehicle)
    - 54 MRV (Maintenance and Recovery Vehicle)
    - 70 MRT (Mobile Repair Team)
- Batch 3: 190 LAV 6.0 ACSV – (ordered the 16 July 2026).
  - More information to follow
Saudi Arabia (Saudi Arabian National Guard) - 928
Vehicles in service with the SANG:
- LAV 6.0 Heavy Assault Variant - 119 (armed autoloading 105mm anti-tank gun, known as the Cockerill CT-CV 105HP Weapon System.)
- LAV 6.0 Anti-Tank Variant - 119 (armed with Falarick 105 anti-tank missile with a range of 5 km and can perforate up to 550mm of armour)
- LAV 6.0 IFV (Direct Fire Support) Variant - 119 (armed with two-man turret and 20mm or 30mm chain guns)
- LAV 6.0 ACSV - 354 (armored troop transport)
- LAV 6.0 Other Variants - 217 (includes Armored Ambulances, Mobile Command Vehicles, VIP Transports, and Armored Recovery Vehicles)
Ukraine (Armed Forces of Ukraine) – 39 + 151 on order/pledged for a total of 190
Vehicles donated by Canada
- LAV 6.0 ACSV – 39 (Nicknamed “Super Bison”), 50 more ordered by Canada, to be delivered to Ukraine, the first batch of 10 to be delivered in summer 2024, after training in Germany.Plus 35 more ordered in July 2026, alongside a Canadian order for 190.
- LAV 6.0 Armoured Personnel Carrier (believed to be the ISC version) - 66

=== Potential clients ===
(Qatar) Qatari Army
Competitors (as of 2024)
- BMC ALTUG
- Boxer – (Germany, Netherlands)
- Iveco SUPERAV Land – (Italy)
- LAV-700 "Desert Viper"
- VBCI-2 – (France)

=== Failed bids ===
Australia (211 vehicles)
The LAV 6.0 participated to the project LAND 400 Phase 2 for the production of the successor of the ASLAV named "CRV". In July 2016, the Boxer and the Patria AMV-35 were pre-selected for a final competition. Among the other competitors were the VBCI and the Sentinel II (based on the Terrex 2). The German-Dutch BOXER IFV was announced as the winner in March 2018.
Brazil (98 vehicles + option for 123)
The Brazilian land forces were looking for an assault gun. General Dynamics Canada offered the LAV-700 Assault Gun equipped with a John Cockerill 3105 turret. The Centauro 2 won the competition in November 2022.
Japan (Approximately 810 vehicles)
The LAV 6.0 participated to the project Next Wheeled Armored Vehicle under the Japanese Ministry of Defense aiming at replacing the Type 96 APC. It was in competition against the Patria AMV^{XP} and a new 8×8 designed by Mitsubishi Heavy Industries. In December 2022, the Japanese Ministry of Defense awarded a contract for the AMV through Patria Japan.
