= LAV III =

Canadian wheeled armored personnel carrier

Light Armoured Vehicle III
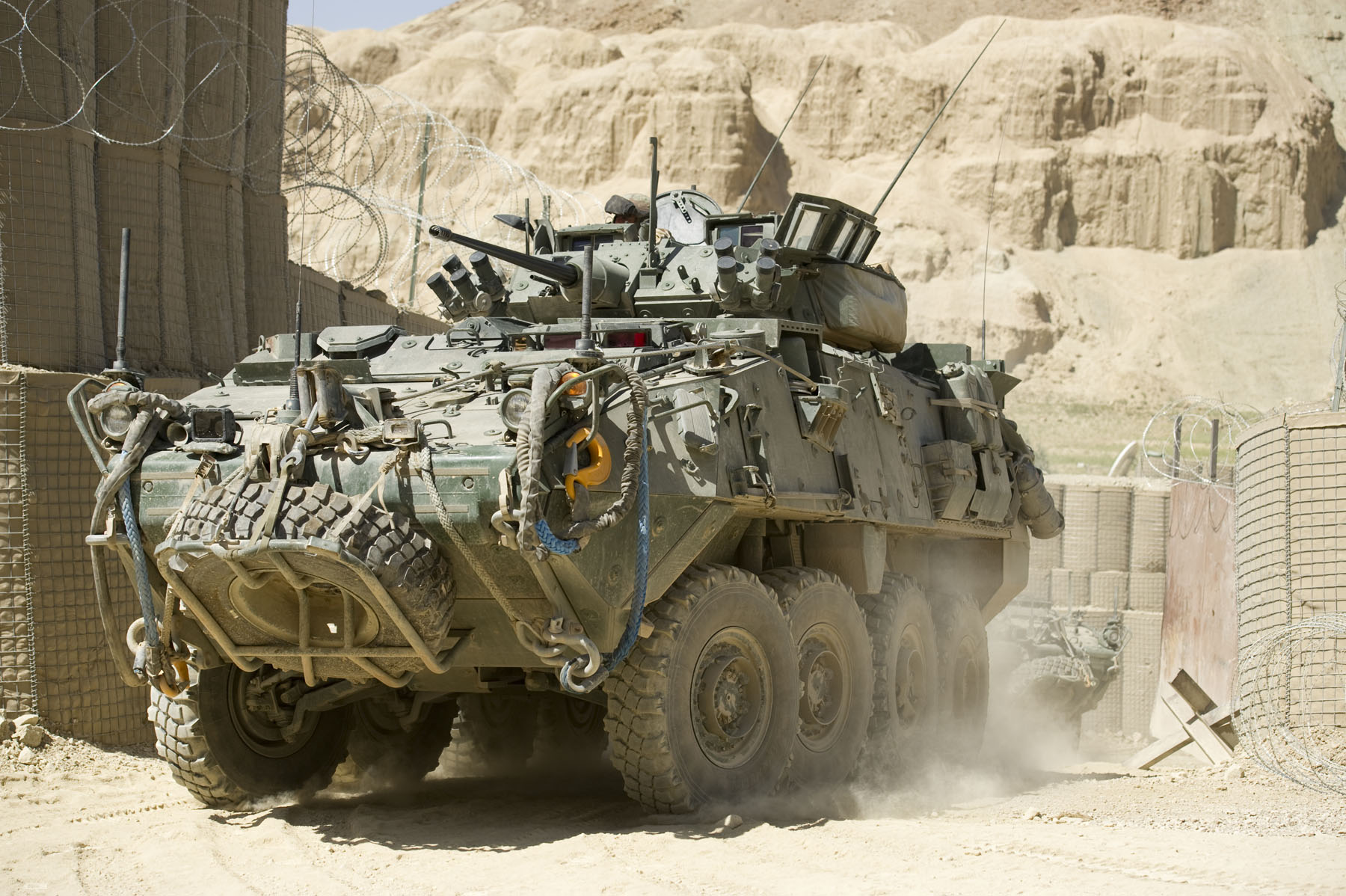
- A New Zealand Army LAV III in Afghanistan
- Type: Infantry fighting vehicle
- Place of origin: Canada

Service history
- Used by: See Operators
- Wars: See Service history

Production history
- Developed from: LAV II
- Developed into: Stryker; NZLAV; LAV 6.0; LAV 700 Desert Viper

Specifications
- Mass: 19-21 metric tons (gross)
- Length: 6.98 m (22 ft 11 in)
- Width: 2.7 m (8 ft 10 in)
- Height: 2.8 m (9 ft 2 in)
- Crew: 3 (Driver, Commander, Gunner, + 6 passengers)
- Main armament: 1 × M242 25 mm chain gun with TIS
- Secondary armament: 2 × C6 7.62 mm machine gun (coaxial, and roof mounted)
- Engine: Caterpillar 3126 diesel 260 kW (350 hp)
- Suspension: Hydropneumatic
- Operational range: 450 km (280 mi)
- Maximum speed: 109 km/h (68 mph)

The LAV III is the third generation of the Light Armoured Vehicle (LAV) family of armoured personnel carriers built by General Dynamics Land Systems – Canada (GDLS-C), a London, Ontario-based subsidiary of General Dynamics. It first entered service in 1999, succeeding the LAV II. It is the primary mechanized infantry vehicle of both the Canadian Army and the New Zealand Army. It also forms the basis of the Stryker vehicle used by the U.S. Army and other operators. The Canadian Army is upgrading its LAV IIIs to the LAV 6 standard. Early in its development history, it was referred to as the 'Kodiak', but the name was never officially adopted.

== Development ==
By July 1991, the Canadian Armed Forces had identified the need to replace their aging fleet of 1960s and 1970s era armoured personnel carriers. As a result, $2.8 billion was earmarked for the Multi-Role Combat Vehicle (MRCV) project by the sitting Conservative government. The mandate of the MRCV project was to provide a series of vehicles based on a common chassis which would replace the M113 armored personnel carrier, Lynx reconnaissance vehicle, Grizzly armoured personnel carrier, and Bison armoured personnel carrier. The project was, however, deemed unaffordable and cancelled by March 1992.

By 1994, after the Liberal Party won the 1993 Canadian federal election, the army was still in need of new vehicles. As a result, the army embarked on the Light Armoured Vehicle Project, which would adapt parts of the MRCV Project and be implemented incrementally to spread out the costs. Also, the requirement to replace the Bisons was dropped. The first phase of the project saw the selection of the LAV II Coyote Reconnaissance Vehicle to replace the Lynx.

General Motors Diesel proposed an upgraded variant of their 8×8 platform incorporating the turret and weapon system of the Coyote. In August 1995, it was announced that GM Diesel (later renamed GM Defense, and subsequently purchased by General Dynamics Land Systems of London, Ontario) had been awarded the contract to produce the LAV III which would replace the Grizzly and a large portion of the M113 armoured personnel carriers.

The LAV III design point was the Mowag Piranha 3H platform, and brought the required modifications to the platform to fit the Canadian needs. The vehicle is fitted with 8×8 driveline and the suspension system of the Piranha 3.

== Design ==
=== Armament ===
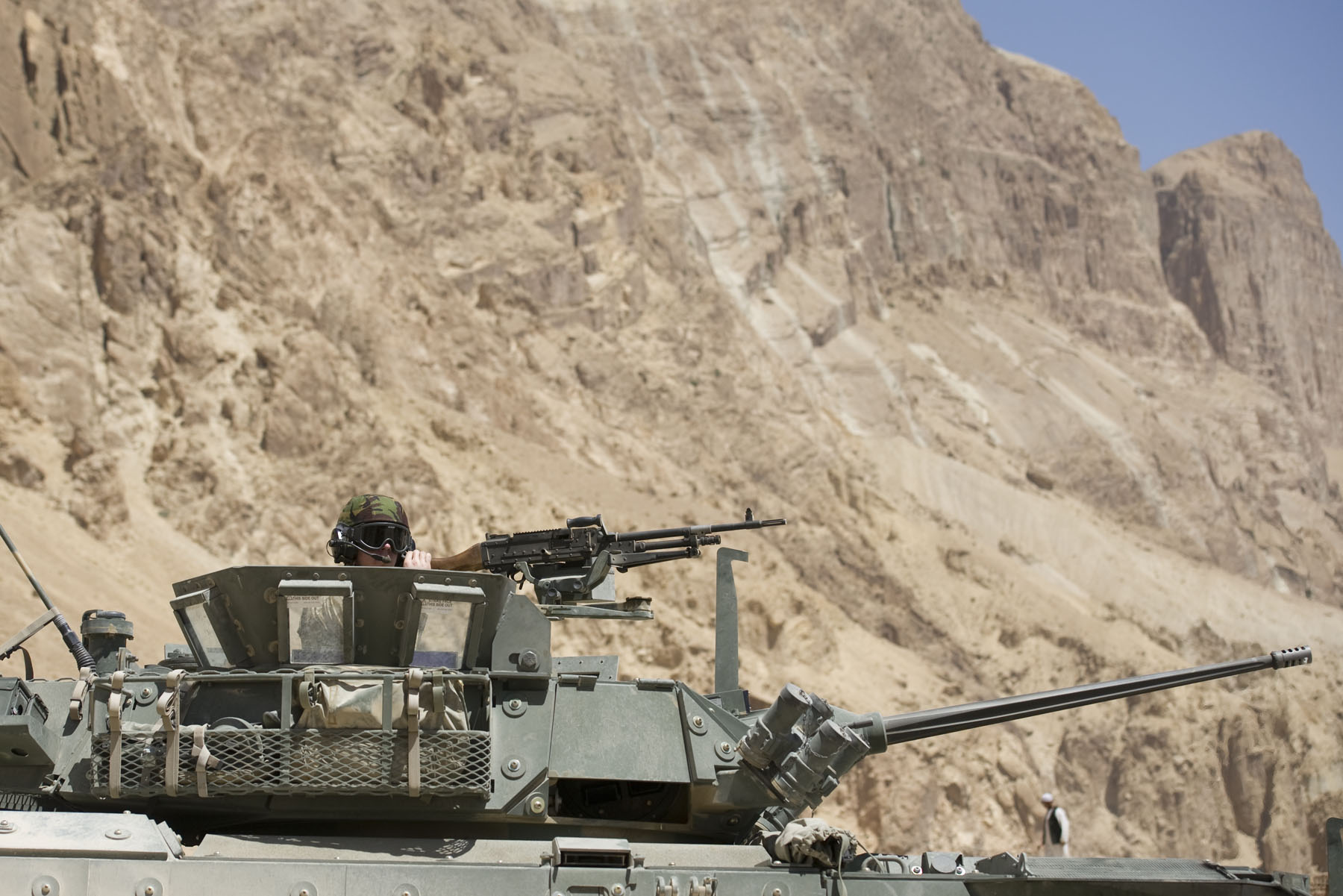
A M242 Bushmaster chain gun is fitted on a LAV III's gun turret, with a machine gun placed atop the turret.

The LAV III is fitted with a two-man turret, armed with the M242 Bushmaster 25 mm caliber chain gun and two FN MAG 7.62 mm machine guns one coaxial and one roof-mounted. The LAV III also has eight 76-mm grenade launchers in two clusters of four launchers positioned on each side of the turret. The grenade launchers are intended for smoke grenades. In 2009, a number of LAV III's were modified with a Nanuk remotely controlled weapon station (RCWS) to provide better protection and to increase the chances of survival of the crew against improvised explosive devices and anti-tank mine threats on the battlefield.

=== Mobility ===
The LAV III is powered by a Caterpillar 3126 diesel engine developing 350 horsepower (260 kW) and can reach speeds above 100 kilometres per hour. The vehicle is fitted with 8×8 drive and also equipped with a central tire inflation system, which allows it to adjust to different terrain, including off-road. The LAV III is fitted with a modern anti-locking brake system (ABS). Unlike earlier versions of the LAV, the LAV III does not have amphibious capabilities.

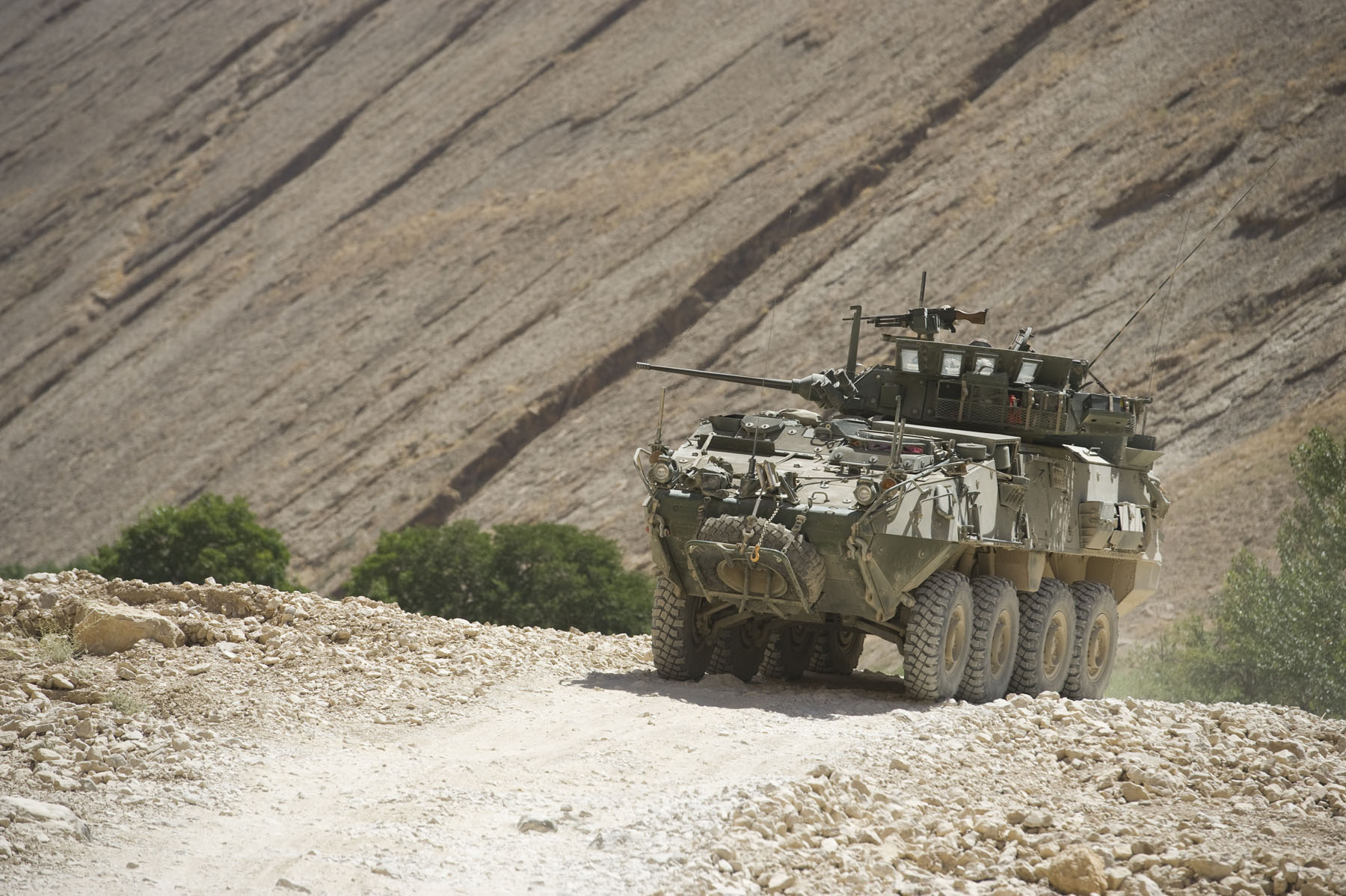
A LAV III performing mounted patrols makes its way through an unpaved road in Bamyan Province.

The LAV III faces the same concerns that most other wheeled military vehicles face. Like all wheeled armoured vehicles, the LAV III's ground pressure is inherently higher than a tracked vehicle with a comparable weight. This is because tires will have less surface area in contact with the ground when compared to a tracked vehicle. Higher ground pressure results in an increased likelihood of sinking into soft terrain such as mud, snow and sand, leading to the vehicle becoming stuck. The lower ground pressure and improved traction offered by tracked vehicles also gives them an advantage over vehicles like the LAV III when it comes to managing slopes, trenches, and other obstacles.

The LAV III can somewhat compensate for these effects by deflating its tires slightly, meaning that the surface area in contact with the ground increases, and the ground pressure is slightly lowered.

However, wheels offer several advantages over tracked vehicles, including lower maintenance for both the vehicle and road infrastructure, quieter movement for improved stealth, greater speed over good terrain, and higher ground clearance. Wheeled vehicle crews are also more likely to survive mine or IED attacks than the crew of a similarly armoured tracked vehicle.

The LAV III's turret gives the vehicle a higher centre of gravity than the vehicle was initially designed for. This has led to concerns that the vehicle is more likely to roll over on uneven terrain.

While there have been several recorded rollovers (about 16), the most common cause was found to be unstable terrain, specifically road shoulders unexpectedly giving away beneath the vehicle. The weight balance of the LAV III is taken into consideration during driver training, largely mitigating the chances of a rollover.

=== Protection ===
The basic armour of the LAV III, covering the Standardization Agreement STANAG 4569 level III, which provides all-round protection against 7.62×51mm NATO small calibre rounds. A ceramic appliqué armour (MEXAS) can be added, which protects against 14.5×114mm heavy calibre rounds from 500 meters. In December 2008 the Government of Canada awarded EODC Engineering, Developing and Licensing Inc. C$81.5 million worth of contracts to provide for add-on-armour kits, modules and spares for its LAV III wheeled armoured personnel carriers. This armour kit is intended to provide increased protection against improvised explosive devices (IED), explosively formed penetrators and 30 mm caliber armour piercing rounds. The LAV III can be also fitted with cage armour, which provides protection against shaped charges. The LAV III is fitted with a nuclear, biological, chemical (NBC) filtration system accompanied with a GID-3 chemical detector and AN/VDR-2 radiation detector systems. The LAV III was designed to produce a very low and very compact structure to minimize radar and IR-signatures. The LAV III also uses heat-absorbing filters to provide temporary protection against thermal imaging (TIS), image intensifiers and infrared cameras (IR). General Dynamics is in the process of integrating the LAV III with an active protection system based on the Israeli Trophy system.

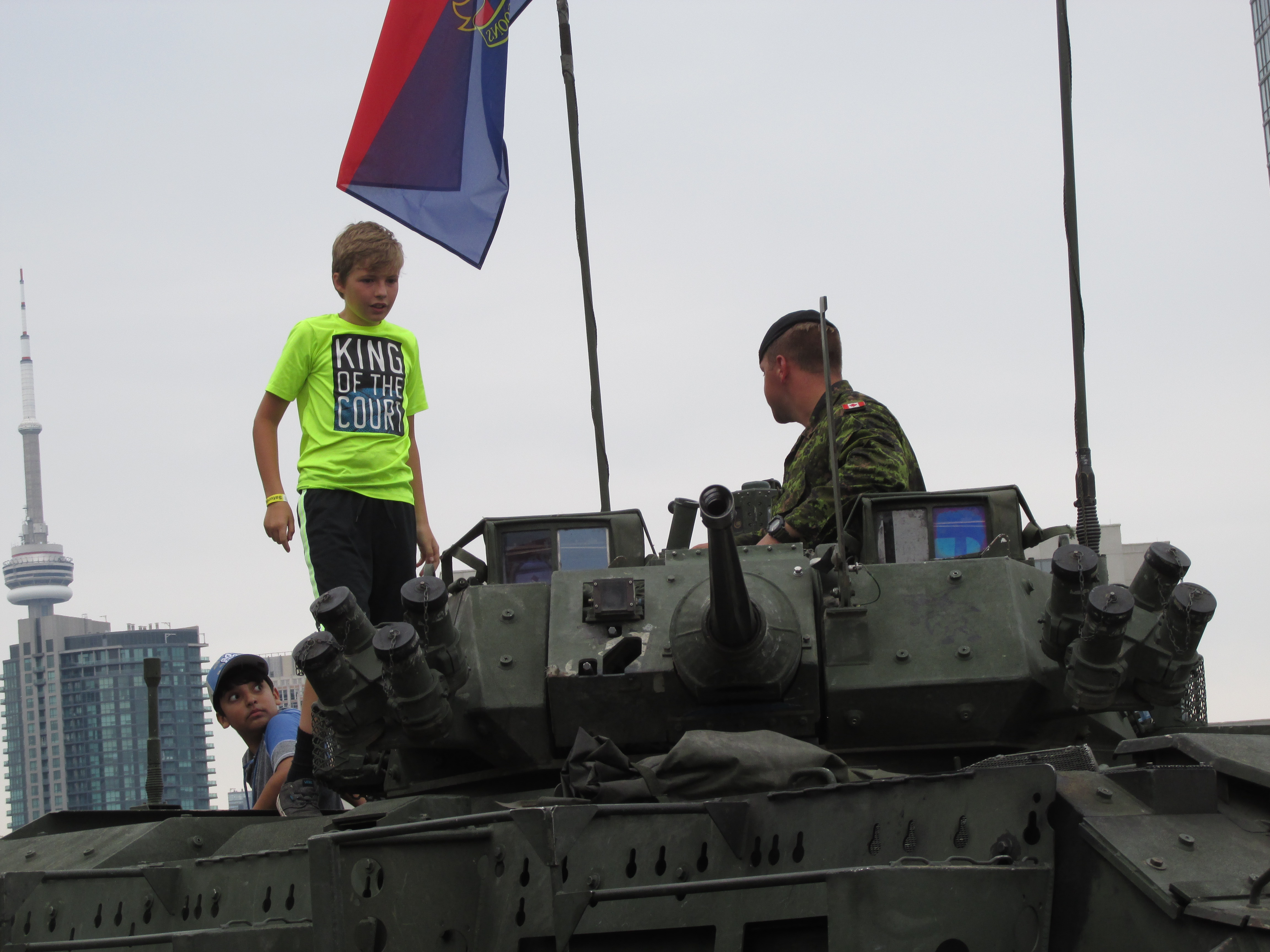
LAV III sights and sensors atop its turret.

The majority of Canadian casualties in Afghanistan have occurred during a patrol aboard a LAV III. This can be explained by the fact that the LAV III is the most commonly used Canadian armoured personnel carrier in theatre, and simply represents a normal association between use and likelihood to encounter a mine or improvised explosive device. The LAV III offers comparable or better protection than most other infantry carriers used in Afghanistan. In an effort to improve protection as a result of experiences in Afghanistan, future LAV III upgrades will likely include improved mine and IED protection.

=== Sights ===
The LAV III is equipped with a daytime optical Thermal Imaging System (TIS) and Generation III Image Intensification (II). The LAV III is equipped with a Tactical Navigation System (TacNav) to assist in navigation and target location tasks. The LAV III is equipped with an LCD monitor directly connected to the vehicle's external cameras, providing real-time images of the battlefield for the passengers.

== Service history ==
The LAV III and related versions have been used in the following:

- United Nations Mission in Ethiopia and Eritrea (UNMEE)
- United Nations Mission in Kosovo (UNMIK)
- United Nations Mission in Bosnia and Herzegovina (UNMIBH)
- United Nations Mission in Haiti (UNMIH)
- War in Afghanistan (ISAF)
- Napier shootings, New Zealand
- Operation Lotus, Canada
- Response to the 2011 Christchurch earthquake, New Zealand
- Colombian armed conflict

=== New Zealand ===
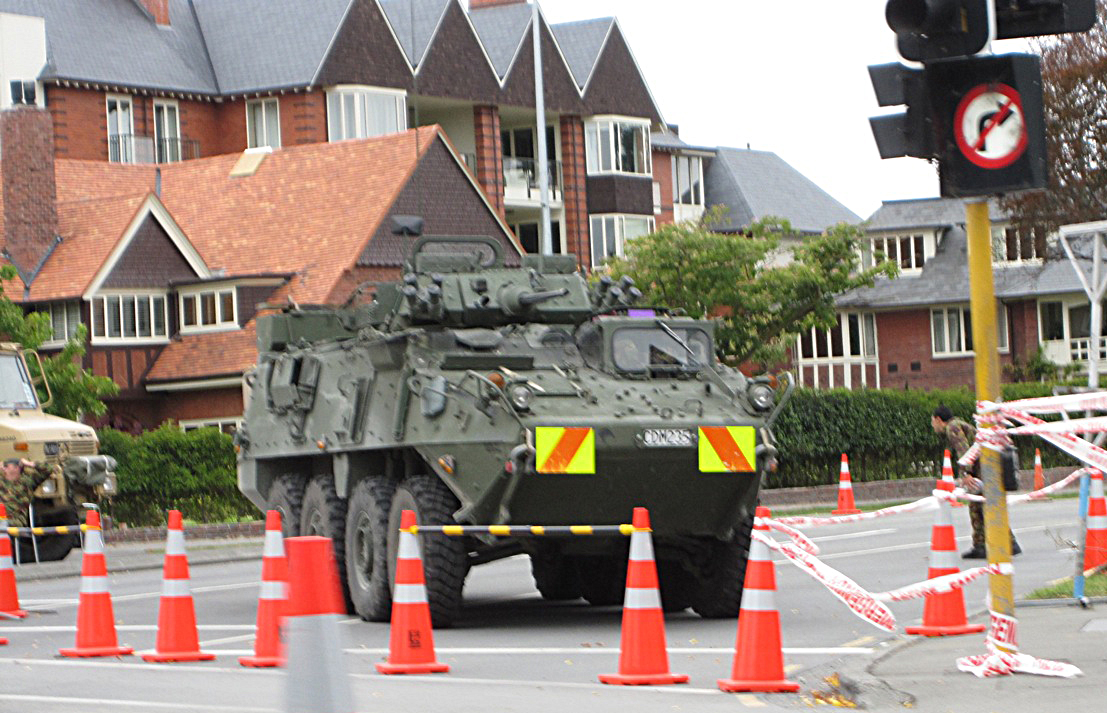
A New Zealand LAV III deployed after the 2011 Christchurch earthquake

In May 2009, two NZLAVs were deployed to support police during the Napier shootings. They protected specialist police while retrieving the body of a deceased police officer from outside the offender's residence. In November 2009, it was announced that three NZLAVs would be deployed to assist NZSAS operations in Afghanistan, and they were up-armoured to resist IED attacks. In 2011, these three LAVs were moved to Bamyan to support the provincial reconstruction team there as they were no longer needed in Kabul due to reduced SAS numbers. Five additional LAVs were also flown to Bamyan. One was later damaged by a roadside bomb. All these LAVs were returned to New Zealand by November 2013.

In 2011, after the Christchurch earthquake, LAVs from Burnham Camp were deployed to assist police with securing the inner city at night.

In March 2016, two LAVs were deployed to assist with lifting a siege near Kawerau in the Bay of Plenty after four policemen were shot at and severely injured.

Originally, 105 NZLAVs were ordered, including 95 Infantry Mobility Vehicles (IMV), 7 Light Obstacle Blade Vehicles (LOB) and 3 Recovery Vehicles (LAV-R).

In 2003, the New Zealand armed forces purchased 105 LAV (Light Armored Vehicle) from Canada, of which 102 were standard vehicles (LOB is a standard NZLAV with a bulldozer blade attached), and 3 were redesigned for recovery.

In 2010, the government said it would look at the possibility of selling 35 LAVs, around a third of the fleet, as being surplus to requirements. In 2012, 20 NZLAVs were made available to be sold, and in 2019 this amount was raised to 30.

On 20 April 2022, the New Zealand Defence Force (NZDF) announced that they had sold 22 NZLAVs to the Chilean Navy. After the sale to Chile, NZDF still had 8 NZLAVs in their inventory for sale. One NZLAV has been written off after being damaged in Afghanistan, and one NZLAV is being used in Canada (the source country for NZLAV) as a test vehicle. 73 NZLAVs remain in service with the NZDF as of April 2022.

== Variants ==
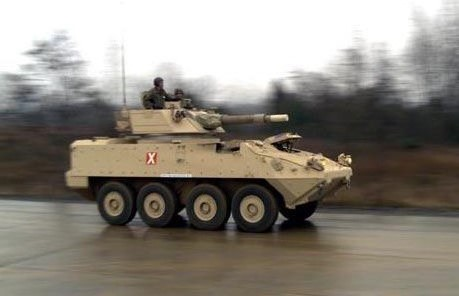
A LAV III variant with a 120mm mortar turret during a demonstration for the U.S. Army's Interim Armored Vehicle program.

- TOW Under Armour (TUA) – Standard LAV III turret replaced with TOW Under Armour launcher for anti-tank purposes
- Infantry Section Carrier (ISC) – Surplus LAV TUA hulls fitted with a Nanuk Remotely Controlled Weapon Station.
- Observation Post Vehicle (OPV) – Standard LAV III equipped for use by forward observation officer (FOO).
- Command Post Vehicle (CPV) – Standard LAV III equipped for command post duties.
- Engineer LAV (ELAV) – LAV III equipped with a dozer blade and other engineering equipment.
- Infantry Mobility Vehicle (IMV) – Standard NZLAV vehicle used in cavalry, reconnaissance, and forward observer roles.
- Light Obstacle Blade (LOB) – An NZLAV IMV fitted with a small blade for minor earth works and clearing of obstacles.
- Recovery (LAV-R) – NZLAV vehicle fitted with a TR200 winch and earth anchor for recovery operations.
- Multi-Mission Effects Vehicle (MMEV) – The project was canceled in 2005

=== LAV 6 ===
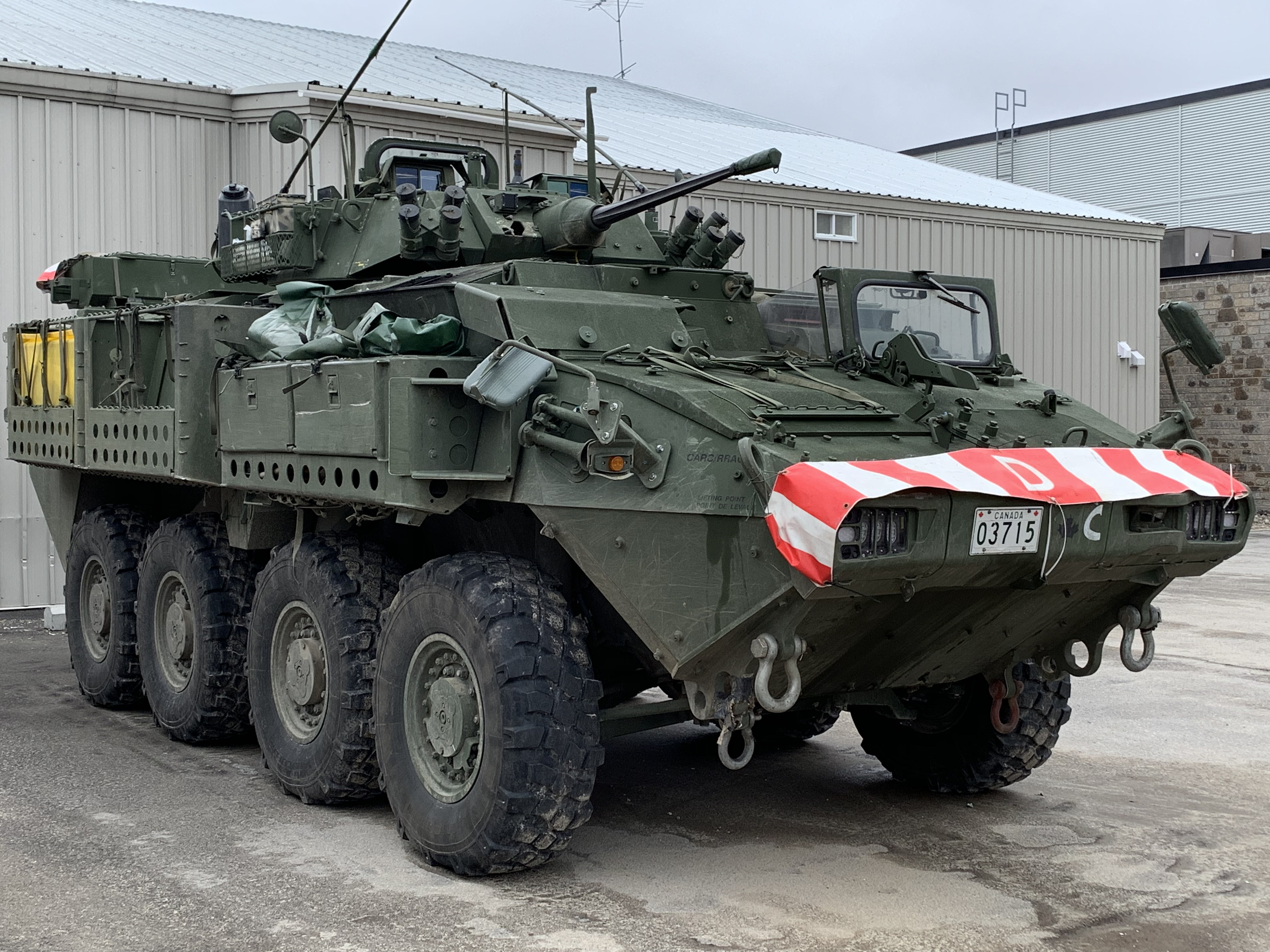
A Canadian Army LAV 6

In October 2011, GDLS-Canada was awarded a contract to upgrade 409 of the Canadian Army's 651 LAV III APCs to the LAV 6 standard. Four variants were ordered: an infantry section carrier, a command post, an observation post and an engineer vehicle. The upgrade was expected to extend the service life of the vehicle to 2035. In February 2017, GDLS-Canada was awarded a $404 million contract to upgrade 141 more LAV IIIs. In August 2019, GDLS-Canada signed a four-year, $3 billion contract to build 360 armoured combat support vehicle variants. The first of these rolled off the assembly line in May 2021.

== Operators ==
A map with LAV III operators marked in blue.

- Canada

- Canadian Army – 651
  - LAV III – 651
    - 494 Infantry Fighting Vehicle - Standard model with turret and 25mm gun
    - 71 TOW Under Armour - Anti-tank variant equipped with two TOW missile launchers on a specialized turret
    - 39 armoured engineering vehicles
    - 47 artillery fire control
  - Modernisation of 616 LAV III to standard LAV 6.0
    - 278 ISC (Infantry Section Carrier)
    - 181 CPV (Command Post)
    - 47 OPV (Observation Post Vehicle for artillery)
    - 44 ELAV (Engineer)
    - 66 RECCE (long range reconnaissance)

- Chile

- Chilean Marine Corps – 22 NZLAVs. Deliveries completed by July 2023 under contract by the Canadian Commercial Corporation (CCC), variant purchased IMV (Infantry Mobility Vehicles).

- Colombia

- Colombian Army – 32 (+ 55 on order)
  - 24 APC ordered in 2012 On December 27, 2012, the Colombian Army selected the LAV III to equip its mechanized infantry units. The vehicles are on order from General Dynamics Land Systems to partially replace their M113s and gradually replace the EE-11 Urutu. They will be armed with the Samson RWS with M2 Browning machine guns or 25 or 30 mm cannons. The contract was officially signed on January 10, 2013 for the order of 24 vehicles worth $65.3 million. They will have the double v-hull design and add-on armor to provide protection against mine blasts, IEDs, and other threats. Deliveries are to be completed by May 2014. Colombia was considering ordering 9–12 more vehicles.
  - 8 APC ordered in 2014
  - In 2023, 55 IFV were ordered by Colombia, equipped with a Samson Dual RWS with a 30mm Orbital ATK Stretch.

- New Zealand
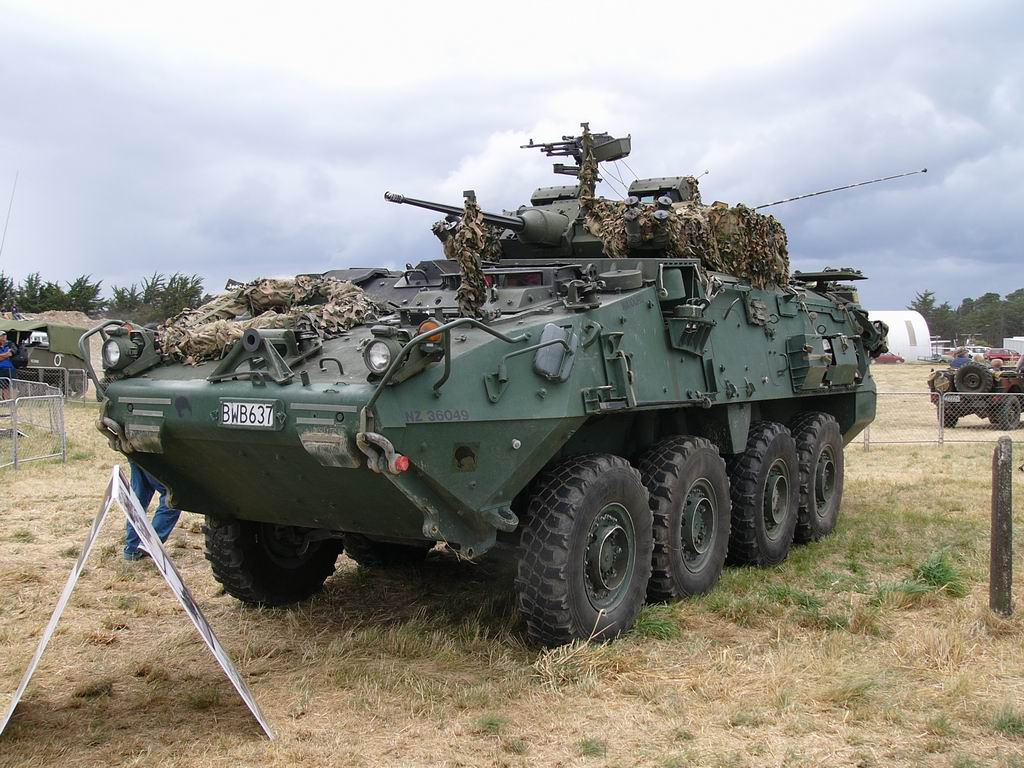
  A New Zealand Army LAV III on display.

- New Zealand Army – 73 NZLAVs operational. 105 LAV III purchased (95 Infantry Mobility Vehicles, 7 LOB standard IMV with Light Obstacle Blade, 3 Recovery LAV-R). Among the 32 not in service, 22 were sold to the Chilean Navy, 1 lost after damage in Afghanistan, 1 used in Canada as test vehicle, and 8 available for sale.

- Saudi Arabia

- Saudi Arabian National Guard – 19 (as well as 928 upgraded LAV 6 vehicles on order)

- United States

- U.S. Army – The US army operates LAV III derived Stryker, ordered from General Dynamics Land Systems Canada in 2000, with delivery of 4,466 completing in 2014.

=== Future operators ===
- Ukrainian Ground Forces - 25

== Preserved examples ==
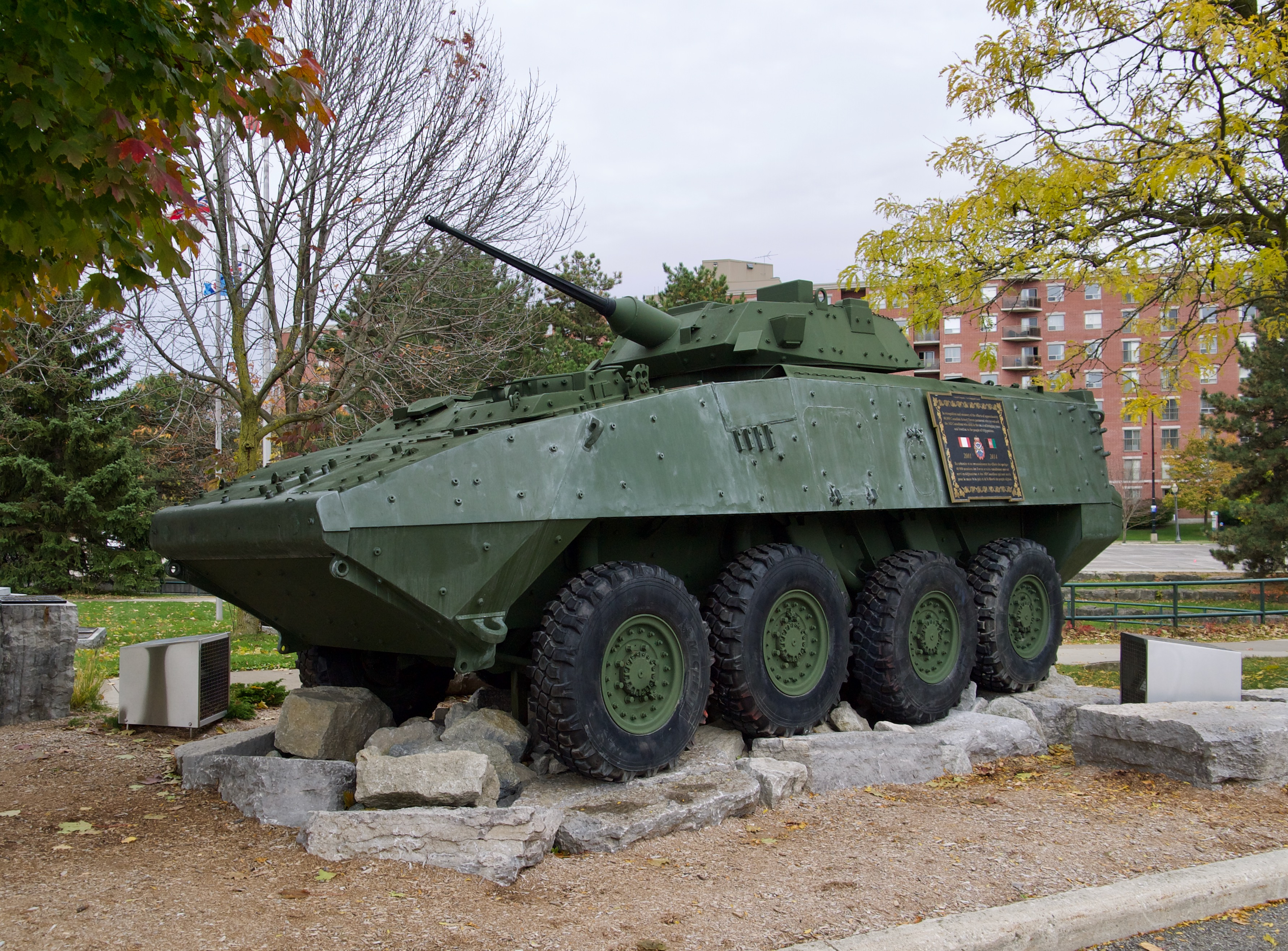
A retired LAV III at a Canadian war memorial in Waterloo, Ontario.

The Canadian Armed Forces launched the LAV III monument program on November 5, 2014. A total of 33 communities across Canada were awarded a decommissioned and demilitarized LAV III. The monuments are in recognition to the Canadian mission in Afghanistan and also serve as a memorial to the 162 Canadians who lost their lives.

- Nose Creek Valley Museum, Airdrie, Alberta. This LAV was unveiled on November 6, 2016.
- Peacekeepers Park, Angus, Ontario. Unveiled August 9, 2017.
- Aurora War Memorial Peace Park, Aurora, Ontario. Dedicated on November 11, 2017.
- Clarington Fields, Bowmanville, Ontario. Unveiled on August 19, 2017.
- The Military Museums, Calgary, Alberta. Dedicated on September 10, 2018.
- McIntosh Armoury, Cambridge, Ontario. Opened for display on September 18, 2016.
- Bain Park, City of Quinte West, Ontario. Unveiled on September 24, 2016.
- Coburg, Ontario. Dedicated on November 8, 2019.
- Town Hall, Conception Bay South, Newfoundland. Dedicated on September 10, 2021.
- Royal Canadian Legion Branch 165, Fort McMurray, Alberta. Displayed on October 28, 2017.
- Royal Canadian Legion Branch 109, Goderich, Ontario. Unveiled on October 1, 2016.
- Canadian Warplane Heritage Museum, Hamilton, Ontario. Dedicated on June 3, 2017.
- Royal Military College of Canada, Kingston, Ontario. Opened on November 11, 2019.
- Kitchener Armoury, Kitchener, Ontario. Unveiled on November 11, 2017.
- Fairview Cemetery, Lacombe, Alberta. Dedicated on July 29, 2017.
- Royal Canadian Legion Branch 544, Lancaster, Ontario. Unveiled to the public on September 16, 2018.
- Royal Canadian Regiment Museum, London, Ontario. Dedicated on November 9, 2018.
- Veterans Square, Marathon, Ontario. Opened on November 11, 2017.
- Shiloh Hill, Mission, British Columbia. Unveiled to the public on July 12, 2019.
- Regional Recreation Centre, outside of Morinville, Alberta. Dedicated on October 2, 2022.
- Oromocto Cenotaph, Oromocto, New Brunswick. Opened on June 22, 2016. This was the first LAV of the program to be unveiled.
- Regina Armoury, Regina, Saskatchewan. Opened on June 6, 2021.
- Parc de la Paix (Peace Park) in Rivière-à-Claude, Gaspésie, Québec. Unveiled on August 17, 2019.
- Veterans Park, Sarnia, Ontario. Dedicated on October 30, 2016.
- Seaforth Armoury, Vancouver, British Columbia. Opened on May 6, 2017.
- CFB Shilo, Manitoba. Unveiled on June 26, 2018.
- Veterans Memorial Park, Sioux Narrows-Nestor Falls, Ontario. Opened on June 29, 2019.
- Royal Canadian Legion Branch 95, Smiths Falls, Ontario. Dedicated on September 16, 2018.
- Fort York Armoury, Toronto, Ontario. Opened on June 10, 2018.
- J.K. Irving Centre, Grand-Bouctouche, New Brunswick. Unveiled on November 11, 2016.
- Waterloo Cenotaph, Waterloo, Ontario. Opened on November 11, 2016.
- Royal Canadian Legion Branch 17, Wellington, Prince Edward Island. Dedicated on December 2, 2016.
- Lt. Col. Harcus Strachen Armoury, Winnipeg, Manitoba. Dedicated on October 27, 2024. This was the final monument of the program.

== Related vehicles ==
- General Motors LAV – (Canada)
- AVGP – (Canada)
- LAV II – (Canada)
  - ASLAV – (Australia)
  - LAV-25 – (Canada)
- VRDE Light Armoured Vehicle (LAWV) – (India)
