= Multi-Mission Effects Vehicle =

- Type: self-propelled anti-aircraft weapon
- Place of origin: Canada

Service history
- In service: Project canceled

Production history
- Designed: 2005

Specifications
- Mass: 16.95 t
- Length: 6.98 m
- Width: 2.7 m
- Height: 2.8 m
- Crew: 4
- Main armament: Air Defense Anti-Tank System; CRV7; IRIS-T
- Secondary armament: Protector (RWS) 7.62 mm machine gun
- Engine: diesel
- Suspension: Hydropneumatic
- Operational range: 450 km (280 mi)
- Maximum speed: 100 km/h (62 mph)

The Multi-Mission Effects Vehicle (MMEV) was a dual-purpose short range surface-to-air and anti-tank platform intended for use by the Canadian Forces. It was based on Air Defense Anti-Tank System (ADATS) technology, and integrated onto an 8×8 wheeled LAV III. The MMEV project was canceled in November 2006.

== Development ==
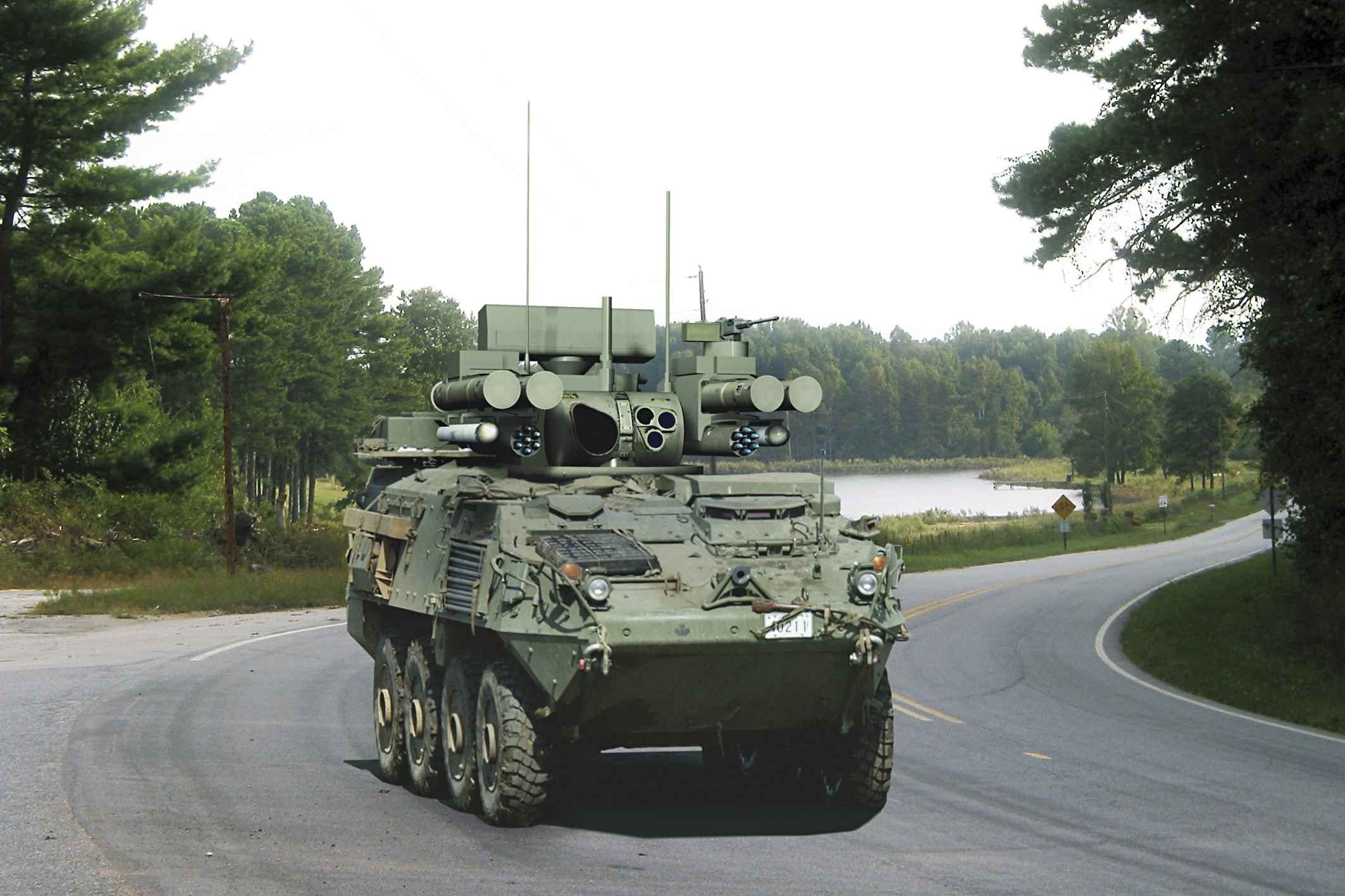
Digital image of the project in 2006.

In late September 2005, the DND announced a $750M project for 30 MMEVs. Prime contractor for the first, $100M phase of the project was to be Oerlikon Contraves Canada. The Canadian Forces worked with Defence Research and Development Canada and Canadian industry through the Technology Demonstration Program to develop fire control systems and ergonomics that would directly contribute to the development of the MMEV. Oerlikon Contraves Canada was selected for the MMEV project since it owns the intellectual property rights to the ADATS technology, the cornerstone of the new MMEV system.

The MMEV was designed to engage fixed wing aircraft and helicopters at low to medium altitudes (20+ km), and land-based targets at up to 8 km. The MMEV was designed with a full ISTAR platform, enabling it to communicate with NATO and Tri-Services of the Canadian Forces.

== Equipment ==
The MMEV was to integrate the latest technology, such the Oerlikon Contraves search-and-acquisition X-Tar 3D radar providing a very high detection probability, covering a range of 25 kilometres. A resistance to electronic and electro-optical systems built by Oerlikon / Rheinmetall.
