= LAV II =

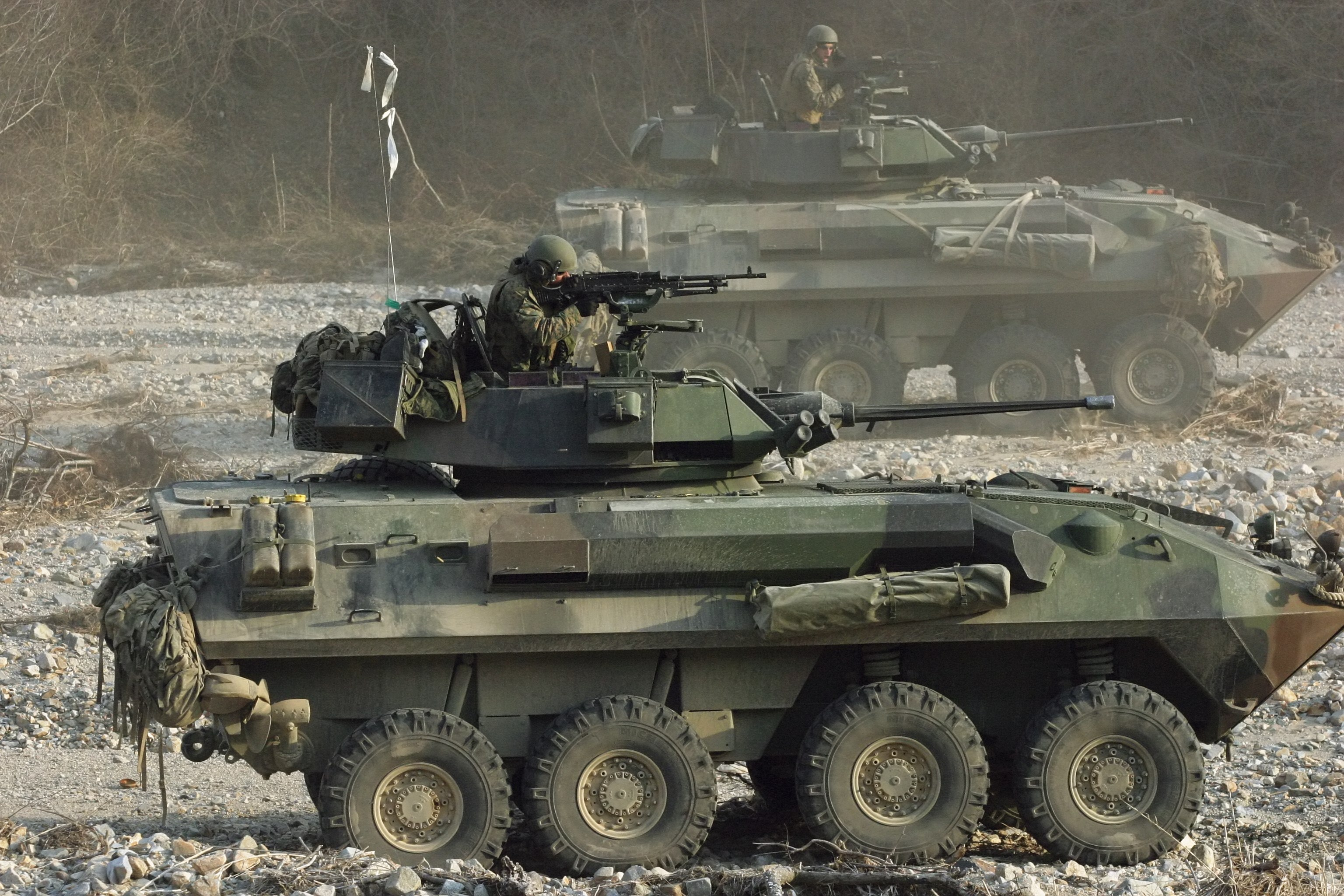
- American LAV-25s in 2006
- Type: Armoured car
- Place of origin: Canada

Service history
- In service: 1980s–present

Production history
- Designer: General Motors Diesel
- Developed from: AVGP
- Developed into: LAV-25; Bison and Coyote armoured vehicles; ASLAV

Specifications
- Mass: 14.4 t (15.9 short tons)
- Length: 6.39 m (21.0 ft)
- Width: 2.50 m (8.2 ft)
- Height: 2.69 m (8.8 ft)
- Crew: 2–4 (depending on variant)
- Main armament: 1 × M242 25mm chain gun with 1 × C6 7.62mm machine gun (coaxial)(Coyote variant only)
- Secondary armament: 1 × C6 7.62mm machine gun (pintle); 8 × grenade launchers (2 × cluster of 4) (all variants)
- Engine: Detroit Diesel 6V53T; 275hp
- Suspension: 8×8 wheeled, 4× drive
- Operational range: 650 km (400 mi)
- Maximum speed: 100 km/h (62 mph) (land); 10 km/h (5.4 kn) (water)

The LAV II is the second generation of the Light Armoured Vehicle (LAV) family. The LAV II is an 8×8 vehicle unlike the 6×6 Armoured Vehicle General Purpose, which is a LAV based on the Piranha I. The United States Marine Corps was the first user of the LAV II, which it calls the LAV-25. Canada procured two main variants: the Coyote Reconnaissance Vehicle and the Bison armoured utility vehicle. LAV IIs in Australia are known as the ASLAV.

== LAV-25 ==
During the 1980s, the U.S. Marine Corps began looking for a light armored vehicle to give their divisions greater mobility. They chose the Light Armored Vehicle design from General Motors Diesel. The LAV-25 was partially based on the 6x6 Armoured Vehicle General Purpose (LAV I) of the Canadian Army that was also produced by General Motors Diesel. It entered service with the Marines in 1983. The U.S. Army was interested in these vehicles at the time but did not order any (however they did later adopt similar vehicles with the introduction of the Stryker family). The Army did, however, borrow at least a dozen LAV-25s for use by the 82nd Airborne Division, 3-73rd Armor for a scout platoon during the Gulf War. These LAV-25s were returned to the Marine Corps after the conflict. The USMC ordered 758 vehicles of all variants. LAVs first saw combat during the Invasion of Panama in 1989 and continued service in the Gulf War, Iraq War, and the War in Afghanistan.

A USMC light-armored reconnaissance battalion includes 56 LAV-25s, 16 LAV-ATs, 12 LAV-Ls, 8 LAV-Ms, 4 LAV-Rs, 4 LAV-C2s, and an unknown number of LAV-MEWSS vehicles.

== Bison ==
The Bison is an armoured vehicle based on the 8x8 LAV-25 platform and was originally designed as an armoured personnel carrier. Entering service in 1990, it was used mainly as an armoured utility vehicle having a number of different sub-variants throughout its years of service.

=== Design ===
By starting with a basic LAV-25, the Bison design process took only seven days. The Bison differs from the baseline LAV-25 by raising the height of the roof, removing the turret ring, placing a commander's cupola behind the driver, and incorporating a rail mount system in the cargo/passenger compartment to quickly change mission specific equipment. The driver is seated in the front-left of the crew compartment. The commander has a slightly raised position directly behind the driver with access to his own hatch and mounted machine gun. The engine is to the right of the crew compartment.

The Canadian Forces began upgrading the Bison between 2002 and 2008. The upgrades include improved engine power, new torsion bars, fittings for add-on armour, air conditioning, and the VRS respirator system for NBC defence.

=== Sub-variants ===
The Bison's rail mount system allows it to be adapted to a variety of roles without any major modifications. Bisons used by the Canadian Forces have been adapted for use as armoured personnel carriers (original configuration, mostly replaced in this role by the LAV III), 81mm mortar carriers, ambulances (32), Mobile Repair Team (MRT) vehicles (32), Armoured recovery vehicles (32), electronic warfare vehicles (25), and NBC reconnaissance vehicles (4).

=== Current operators ===
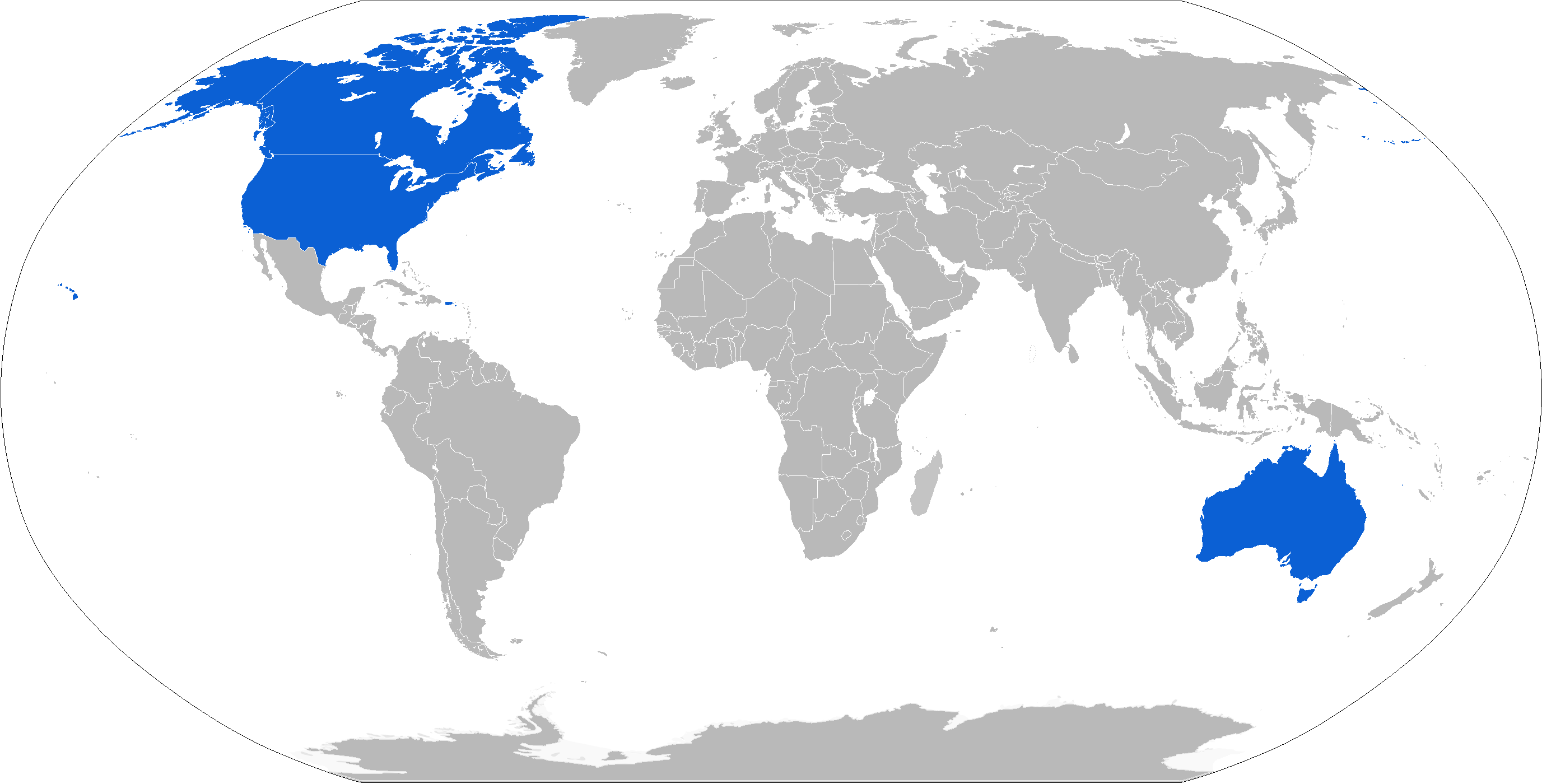
Map of Bison operators in blue

- Australian Army – 97 (See ASLAV Type II)
- Canadian Army – 199 (being phased out and replaced by LAV VI)
- US National Guard – 12

== Coyote Reconnaissance Vehicle ==
The Coyote has been in Canadian service from 1996 and was acquired for use in the light reconnaissance (scout) role, although was also initially used as an armoured fighting vehicle in the role of medium tank trainer within armoured squadrons in the same way as the Armoured Vehicle General Purpose (AVGP) it replaced. In service since 1996, the Coyote is a later generation of the LAV-25 and is of the same family and similar generation as the Bison APC and the Australian ASLAV.

=== Armament ===
The Coyote mounts a 25×137mm M242 Bushmaster chain gun and two 7.62×51mm NATO C6 general purpose machine guns. One of the machine guns is mounted coaxial to the main gun while the other is pintle-mounted in front of the crew commander's hatch. The main gun is equipped with dual ammunition feeds that allow for separate weapons effects, selectable by the gunner/crew commander; the standard load is a belt of armour-piercing sabot rounds and a belt of HE-T explosive/fragmentation rounds. The main gun and coax machine gun are 2-axis stabilized. The turret is equipped with a laser rangefinder, but no ballistic computer; elevation and lead corrections are applied manually by the gunner using multi-stadia reticules in the day, thermal, and image intensification sights. The turret is also equipped with grenade dischargers that can be loaded with smoke and fragmentation grenades.

=== Mobility ===
The Coyote is powered by a Detroit Diesel 6V53T engine developing 400 horsepower (300 kW), and can reach speeds of 100 kilometres per hour (62 mph) (on road). The Coyote has a maximum road range of 660 kilometres (410 mi). It uses a larger wheel than initially used on the Bison and AVGP (these vehicles were later retrofitted with this wheel). Compared to the later LAV-III family of vehicles, the Coyote is smaller, uses smaller wheels and tires, has a "sharp" rather than "rounded" nose profile, and has a smaller, oval driver's hatch. Like the LAV-III, the Coyote can be fitted with additional ceramic bolt-on armour panels for increased protection. The Coyote can be transported on a Hercules C-130 plane but the turret needs first to be removed.

=== Sub-variants ===
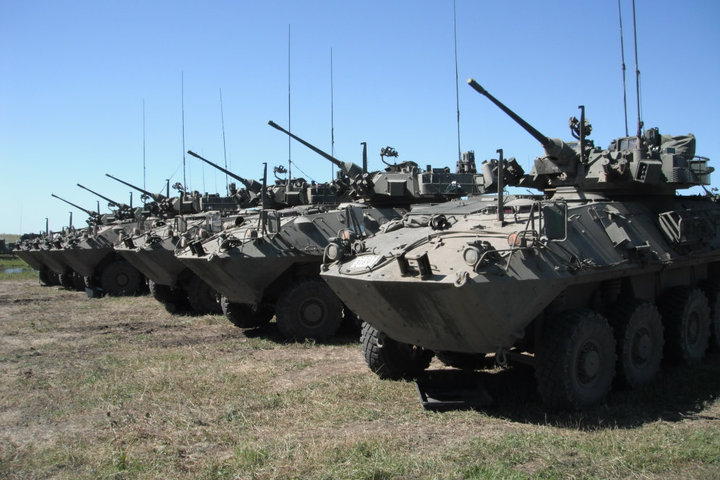
Coyotes of the 12^{e} Régiment blindé du Canada

Coyotes come in three variants: Command, Mast, and Remote. The Mast and Remote variants have a sophisticated suite of electronic surveillance equipment including radar, video, and infrared surveillance night vision devices. The mast variant has this equipment mounted on a 10-metre telescoping mast that can be extended to raise the surveillance suite out from behind cover. The remote variant of the Coyote has its surveillance suite mounted on two short tripods, which crew can deploy remotely using a 200-metre spool of cable.

When first purchased, the Coyote was designated for service with both the Regular Force and Reserve Force, with the Mast variants earmarked for the Regular units and the Remotes designated for the Reserves. Shortly after taking delivery of the vehicles, but before they were assigned to the Reserve units, all Coyotes were reassigned to the Regular Force.

=== Service history ===
Since the introduction of the Coyote to the Canadian Armed Forces, the vehicle has served national interest domestically and abroad. The Coyote served during the United Nations/ NATO missions in Bosnia and Herzegovina, Macedonia, Kosovo, and in Afghanistan. Domestically, it has been deployed during "Operation Grizzly" to Kananaskis to secure the 28th G8 summit, the 36th G8 summit, and the 2010 G-20 Toronto summit, in addition to a number of domestic emergency response incidents. The Coyote is currently being retired and is being replaced by a mix of Tactical Armoured Patrol Vehicles and LAV 6 armoured vehicles.
