= ASLAV =

Australian/Canadian reconnaissance vehicle

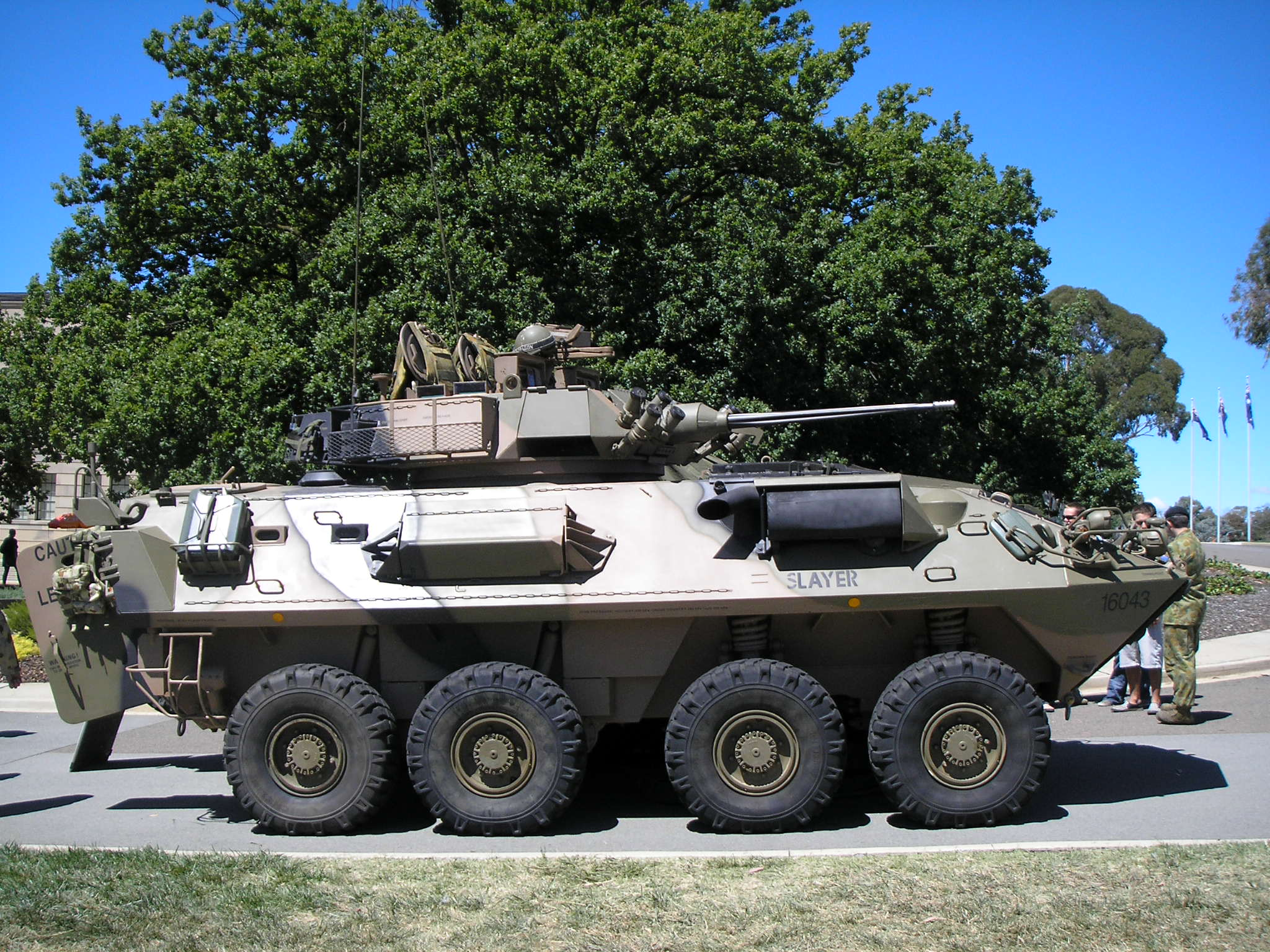
- ASLAV-25
- Type: Reconnaissance vehicle
- Place of origin: Australia/Canada

Service history
- In service: 1995–present
- Used by: Australian Army
- Wars: Iraq War, Afghanistan, East Timor

Production history
- Designer: General Dynamics Land Systems
- Designed: 1992–1994
- Manufacturer: General Motors Diesel & General Dynamics Land Systems–Australia
- Unit cost: A$2.2M
- Produced: 1995–2007
- No. built: 257
- Variants: See variants

Specifications
- Mass: 13.2 t (13.0 long tons)
- Length: 6.53 m (21.4 ft)
- Width: 2.62 m (8.6 ft)
- Height: 2.69 m (8.8 ft)
- Crew: 3
- Passengers: 6
- Main armament: M242 25mm Bushmaster Chain Gun; 210 rounds
- Secondary armament: FN MAG 58 7.62 mm machine gun 1000 rounds
- Engine: Detroit Diesel 6V-53T; 205 kW (275 hp)
- Power/weight: 15.53 kW/tonne
- Drive: Wheeled 8x8
- Transmission: Allison MT653
- Operational range: 660 km (410 mi)
- Maximum speed: 100 km/h (62 mph)
- References: Australian Army & Jane's

The Australian Light Armoured Vehicle (ASLAV) is an eight-wheeled armoured reconnaissance vehicle of the LAV II family used by the Australian Army. It was built by General Dynamics Land Systems Canada, and developed from the U.S. Marine Corps' LAV-25 and Canadian Army's Bison armoured fighting vehicles.

== Description ==
The ASLAV is a highly mobile, eight-wheel drive armoured fighting vehicle that can be deployed by land, sea or air, in Royal Australian Air Force C-130s or C-17s. It is fitted with GPS, an intra-vehicular navigation system and a radio harness capable of supporting HF, VHF, UHF and digital radios.

The ASLAV is capable of speeds of 100 km/h (62 mph) and has a maximum range in excess of 660 km (410 mi). The eight-wheel drive provides excellent cross-country mobility and redundancy. The vehicle is capable of operation with only four working wheels, and can continue to operate with eight punctured tyres through the use of solid-core run-flat tyres. It is no longer a fully amphibious vehicle.

=== Variants ===
The ASLAV fleet comprises a number of specialist purpose-designed variants built in three distinct hull configurations.

==== ASLAV Type I ====
The ASLAV Type I is the most numerous type. It is a turreted vehicle derived from the LAV-25 and comes in only one variant.

- ASLAV-25 (Reconnaissance) – is an Armoured Car with a crew of three (commander, gunner & driver). The two-man turret has day, thermal and infrared imaging weapon systems, a stabilised M242 25 mm dual-feed chain gun and two FN MAG 58 7.62 mm machine guns. The ASLAV-25 conducts troop-level tactical reconnaissance and can carry up to six dismounts in the rear.

==== ASLAV Type II ====
The ASLAV Type II has no turret and greater internal capacity and is derived from the Canadian Bison Armoured Personnel Carrier. The ASLAV Type II has a crew of two (commander and driver) and is armed with a pintle-mounted M2 12.7 mm machine gun. In a number of vehicles, the standard machine gun pintle mount is replaced by a Kongsberg Protector remote weapon station (RWS), which can accommodate either a 12.7 mm machine gun or a Mk 19 40 mm automatic grenade launcher. Using a common hull design installed with interchangeable Mission Role Installation Kits (MRIKs), it can be converted into any one of four variants.

- ASLAV-PC (Personnel Carrier) – is an Armoured Personnel Carrier capable of carrying seven fully-equipped troops in support of troop-level tactical reconnaissance.
- ASLAV-C (Command) – is an Armoured Command Vehicle equipped with an enhanced radio installation and radio masts, map boards, stowage compartments, specialised seating and a stowable annex. In addition to the crew, the ASLAV-C can accommodate three staff officers and provides command and control at the Squadron and Regimental Headquarter level.
- ASLAV-S (Surveillance) – is a specialised surveillance vehicle equipped with a hydraulically raised mast-mounted thermal imager, laser range finder, day television camera and battlefield surveillance radar AMSTAR. The ASLAV-S supports tactical reconnaissance with ground surveillance and observation and can carry four crew and two occasional troops.
- ASLAV-A (Ambulance) – is an Armoured Ambulance and is fitted with specialist medical equipment. In addition to the crew, it can accommodate a medic and three lying patients or six sitting patients.

==== ASLAV Type III ====
The ASLAV Type III has no turret and is used by members of the Royal Australian Electrical and Mechanical Engineers for repair and recovery. The ASLAV Type III has a crew of two (commander and driver) and usually carries a third mechanic. It is armed with a pintle-mounted FN MAG 58 7.62 mm machine gun, although some were temporarily fitted with the Kongsberg Protector RWS for service in the Middle East Area of Operations. The ASLAV Type III comes in two variants utilising two specialist MRIKs.

- ASLAV-F (Fitter) – is a maintenance support vehicle that provides a protected mobile workshop for field repair personnel, including vehicle parts and tools, and is fitted with a HIAB 650 crane.
- ASLAV-R (Recovery) – is an Armoured Recovery Vehicle equipped with a heavy winch to recover disabled vehicles to a more accessible location or tow them to a repair facility.

== History ==
The acquisition of the ASLAV family of vehicles for the Australian Army was managed by Defence Materiel Organisation under the multi-phased LAND 112 project. The vehicles were similar to those considered by the Australian Army to replace its M113 armoured personnel carriers in the early 1980s under Project Waler.

In April 1989, the Australian Army purchased 15 ex-United States Marine Corps LAV-25 vehicles at a cost of A$28.4 million under LAND 112 Phase 1. These vehicles were purchased to trial the Wheeled Armoured Fighting Vehicle (WAFV) concept in northern Australia. The trials were conducted by the 2nd Cavalry Regiment in 1990–1991. The subsequent report endorsed the WAFV concept, and the Army determined that the LAV was the best vehicle to fulfil the intended role of armoured reconnaissance and surveillance.

In December 1992, Defence contracted the Canadian Commercial Corporation to supply 97 improved ASLAV Phase 2 vehicles under LAND 112 Phase 2, at a cost of A$123.84 million. These 97 vehicles were built in Canada by the Diesel Division of General Motors of Canada, with final fitting performed in Australia by Tenix Defence. The first vehicles were completed in 1994. In June 1995, the scope was broadened to include replacements for the Phase 1 vehicles. In total 113 vehicles were purchased under Phase 2, with all vehicles being delivered to the 2nd Cavalry Regiment in Darwin and the School of Armour at Puckapunyal over the period 1995–1997.

In December 1997, the Australian government approved the acquisition of an additional 150 vehicles, later amended to 144. Under LAND 112 Phase 3, the initial contract with the Canadian Commercial Corporation was amended at a cost of A$286.37 million for an additional 144 newly built, improved Phase 3 ASLAVs, an upgrade of the Phase 2 fleet to Phase 3 standard and the provision of supporting ancillary equipment. The Phase 3 vehicles had enhanced offensive capabilities and crew protection, including new electric turret drives, improved thermal sights, integrated laser range finder, a second generation drive line and new suspension components.

In the preparations for deployment to Iraq in 2003, 10 ASLAV Type IIs and Type IIIs were fitted with the Kongsberg Protector RWS. In total 59 systems were acquired from Kongsberg for A$17.9 million and fitted to vehicles operating in Iraq and Afghanistan. Further upgrades to crew protection for vehicles deployed to Iraq occurred with the fitting of bar armour and internal spall liners to better withstand blasts, small-arms hits and fragmentation.

=== Replacement ===
The ASLAV is to be replaced in Australian Army service by the Boxer Combat Reconnaissance Vehicle, under LAND 400 Phase 2, with deliveries expected from 2020.

== Service ==
In the Australian Army, the ASLAV equips the Cavalry Squadrons of the Royal Australian Armoured Corps. A Cavalry Squadron comprises a headquarters element, an echelon and three sabre troops of four ASLAVs each. Each troop is further broken down into two patrols, each comprising two ASLAV-25s.

The ASLAV equips two squadrons from each of the Australian Army's Armoured Cavalry Regiments, the 1st Armoured Regiment in Adelaide, the 2nd Cavalry Regiment in Townsville, and the 2nd/14th Light Horse Regiment (Queensland Mounted Infantry) in Brisbane, as well as the School of Armour at Puckapunyal.

=== Operational service ===
The Australian Army's ASLAV fleet saw continual operational service from 1999 to 2013.

==== East Timor ====
On 21 September 1999, C Squadron, 2nd Cavalry Regiment deployed 22 ASLAVs into Dili aboard HMAS Tobruk as a part of International Force East Timor, a further seven ASLAVs being deployed later to East Timor as a part of the commitment. The vehicles were used for a variety of tasks, including convoy escort, surveillance, reconnaissance, communications, search, vehicle check points and force presence.

==== Iraq ====
From 2003 to 2009, the Australian Army deployed ASLAVs to Iraq with its commitment to the Iraq War. The vehicles were used as a part of the SECDET rotations in Baghdad, as well as AMTG and the subsequent OBG(W) rotations in Dhi Qar Governorate. In 13 April 2004, the first Australian engagement of the ASLAV's 25 mm main armament against enemy elements occurred when an ASLAV from SECDET engaged an enemy mortar base plate that was in the process of firing mortars into the Baghdad Green Zone.

==== Afghanistan ====
From 2006 to 2013, the Australian Army deployed ASLAVs to Afghanistan with its commitment to the War in Afghanistan. Predominantly deployed to Urozgan Province, the vehicles were used as part of the Reconstruction Task Force (RTF), Mentoring and Reconstruction Task Force (MRTF) and Mentoring Task Force (MTF) rotations, as well as supporting Special Forces Task Group (SFTG) rotations.

== Gallery ==
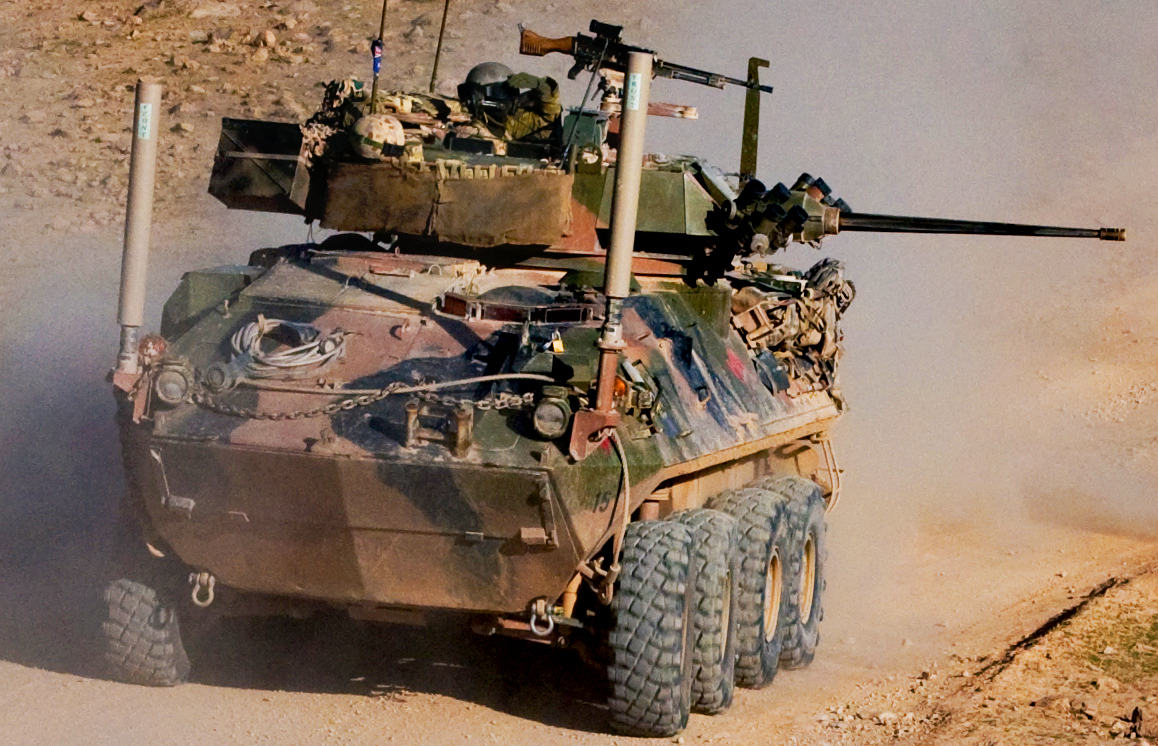
ASLAV-25 in Afghanistan

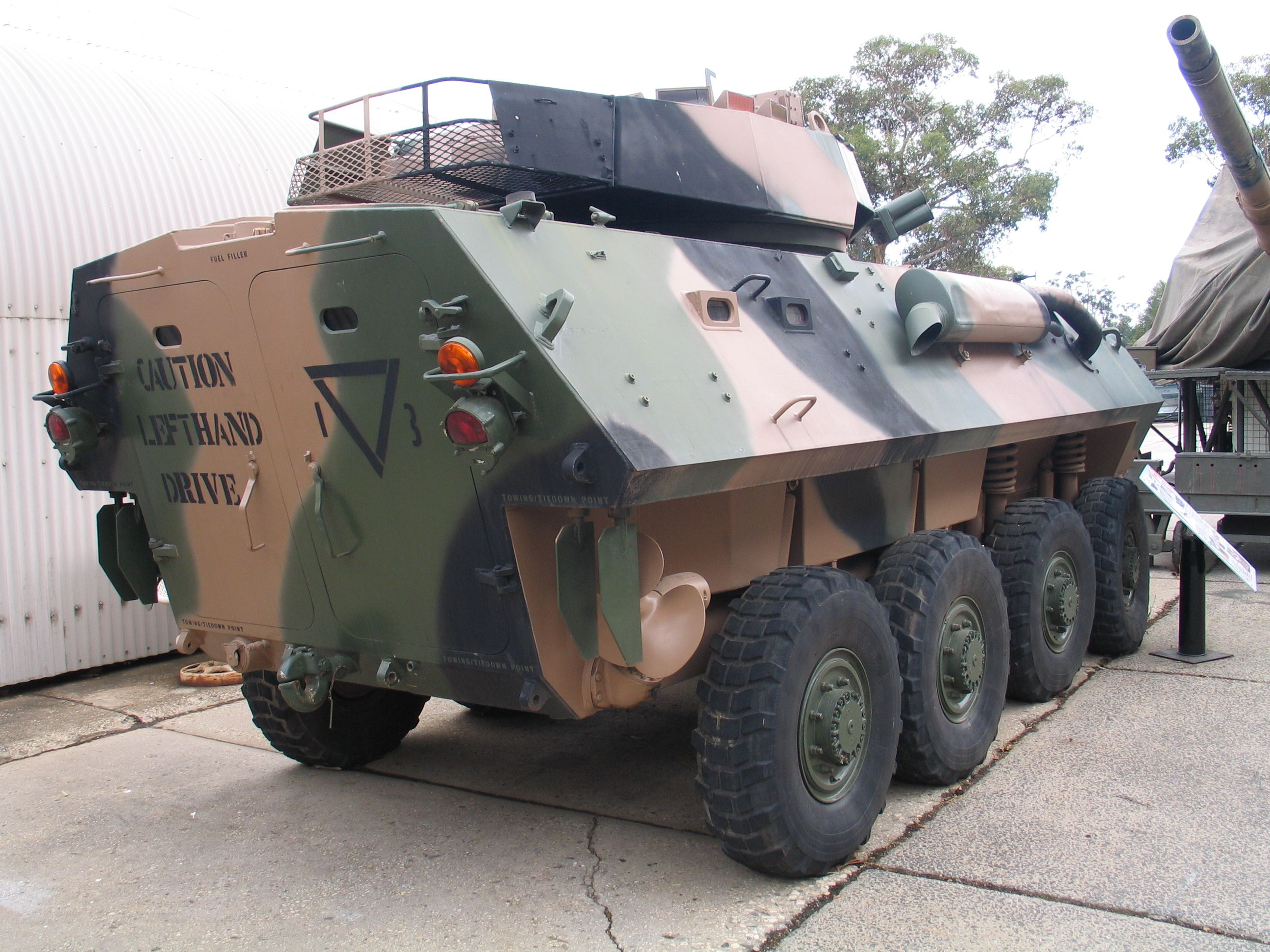
Trial LAV-25 at Puckapunyal

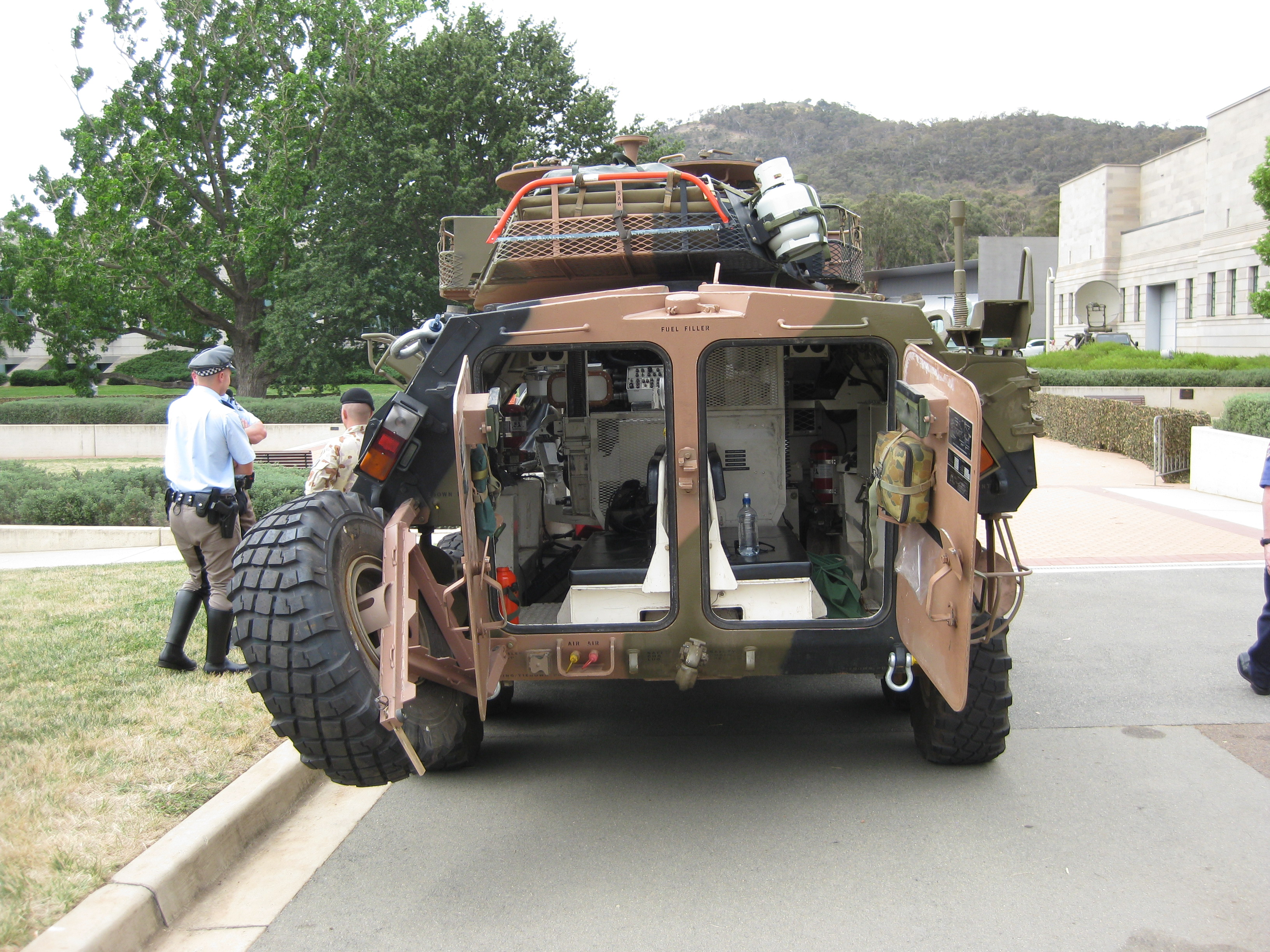
ASLAV-25 rear view

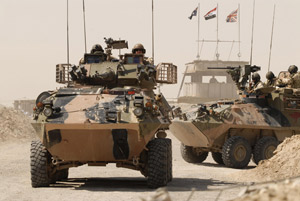
ASLAVs in Iraq

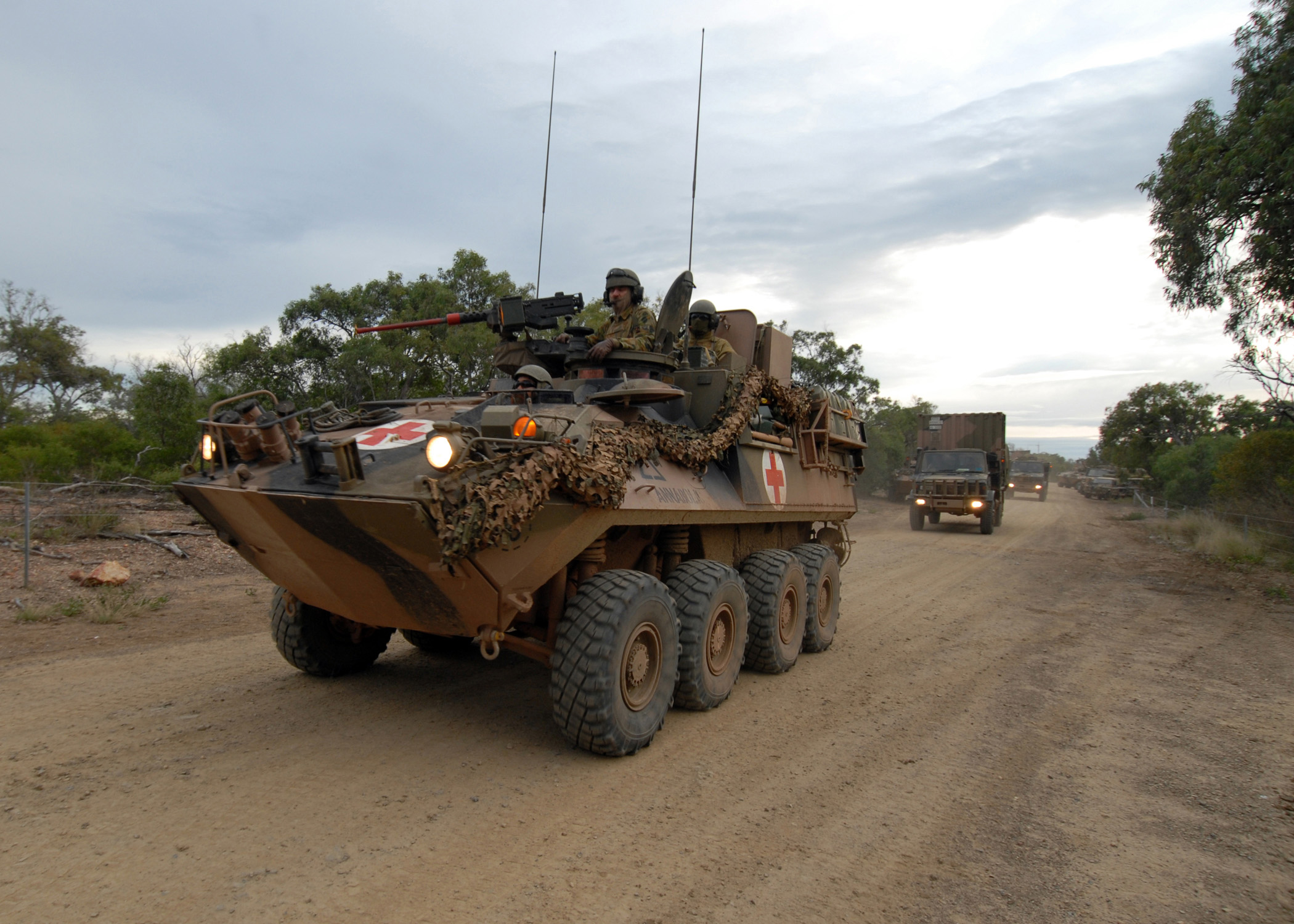
ASLAV-A on exercise

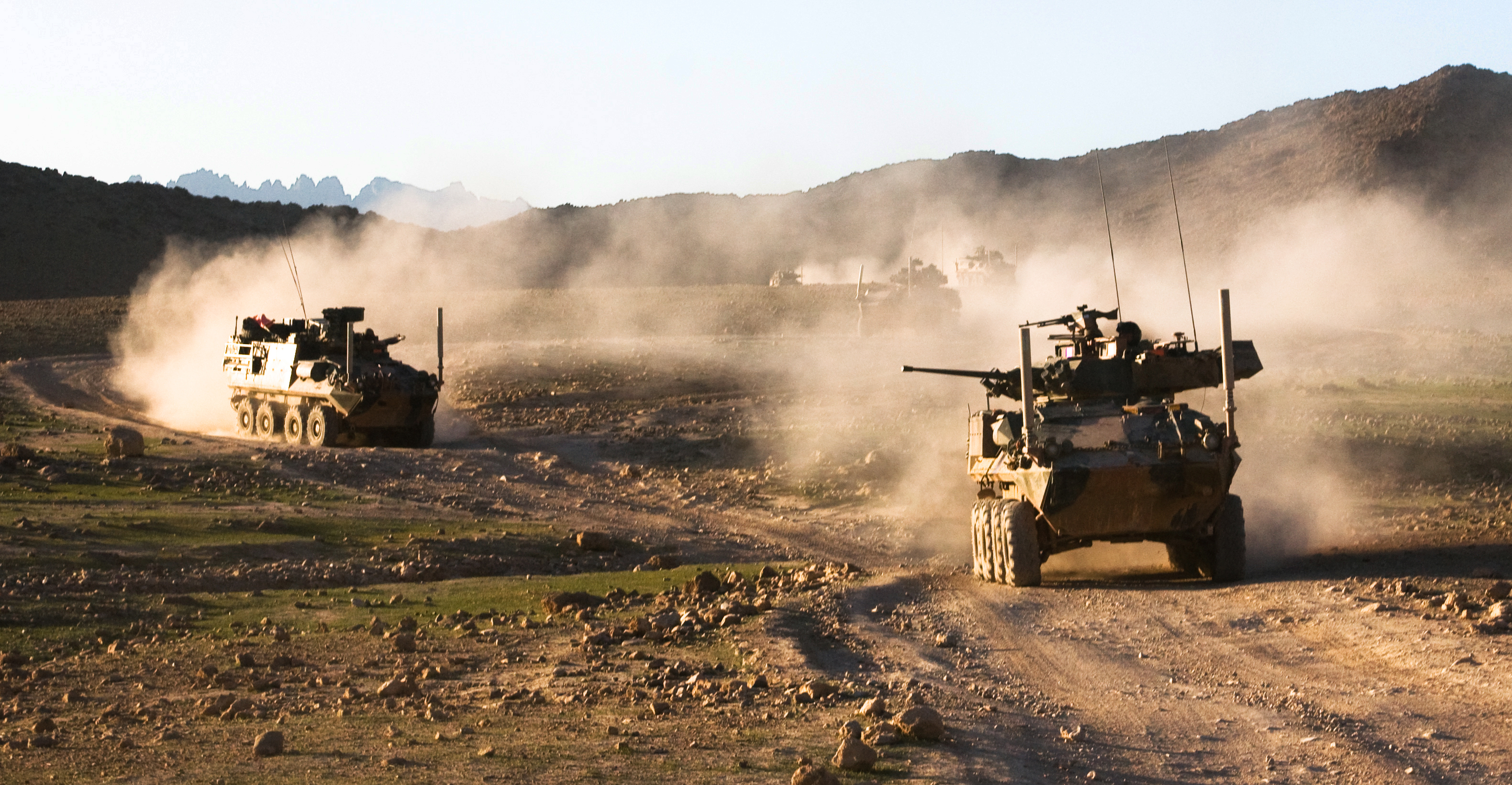
ASLAV-25 & ASLAV-PC
