= Bison and Coyote armoured vehicles =

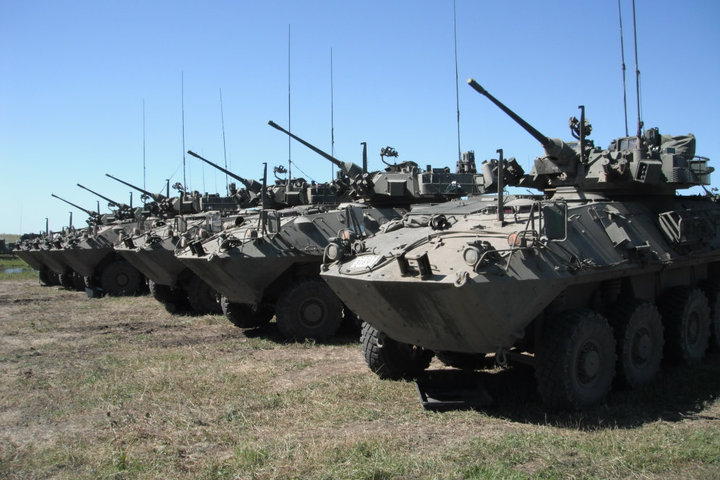
Coyotes from the 12^{e} Régiment blindé du Canada

The LAV II Bison and Coyote are armoured cars, or armoured personnel carriers built by General Dynamics Land Systems Canada for the Canadian Armed Forces. Bison vehicles have been used to a lesser extent by the Australian Army and the US National Guard.

== Bison ==
Bison
- Type: Armoured personnel carrier
- Place of origin: Canada

Service history
- In service: 1990–present
- Used by: See: 'Operators'
- Wars: War on terror War in Afghanistan (2001–2021) Yugoslav Wars (1991-2001) United Nations Operation in Somalia II (1993-1995) Gulf War (1990-1991) Oka Crisis (1990)

Production history
- Designer: General Motors Diesel
- Designed: 1988
- Manufacturer: Diesel Division General Motors Canada
- Produced: 1988 (prototype); 1989 (regular production)
- No. built: 199
- Variants: Personnel Carrier, Field Ambulance, 81mm Mortar Carrier, Command Post, Maintenance and Recovery Vehicle, Electronic Warfare Vehicle, Mobile Repair Team Vehicle, Air Space Coordination Centre Vehicle, Reconnaissance Vehicle

Specifications
- Mass: 13 t (14 short tons)
- Length: 6.5 m (21 ft)
- Width: 2.6 m (8.5 ft)
- Height: 2.6 m (8.5 ft)
- Crew: 2 (driver & commander) + 8 passengers
- Main armament: 1 × C6 7.62mm machine gun (pintle)
- Engine: Detroit Diesel 6V53T two-cycle turbo-charged diesel 275 hp
- Transmission: Allison 5-speed MT653
- Suspension: 8x8
- Operational range: 650 km (400 mi)
- Maximum speed: 100 km/h (62 mph) (land); 10 km/h (5.4 kn) (water)

The Bison is an armoured personnel carrier that has been in active service since 1990, built by Diesel Division General Motors Canada.

They were purchased and intended for operation by the Canadian Forces Primary Reserve, but were rapidly appropriated by the Regular Force of Land Force Command, leaving the armoured Reserve units with unarmed Iltis jeeps.

=== Origins ===
Land Force Command began looking for a new armoured personnel carrier to equip the Canadian Forces Reserves, after the release of the 1987 Defence White Paper by the then recently appointed Minister of National Defence (Canada) Perrin Beatty, which announced major spending increases to support the Canadian Forces Reserves. Leading this project was Colonel Roméo Dallaire, the Head of the Army's Armoured Vehicle Assessment and Procurement at the time, who was intent on purchasing 200 M113A3, the most recently upgraded variant of the M113 series, which the Canadian Forces were already using in the form of M113A1s and M113A2s.

The original plan for these 200 M113A3s was to have the vehicles manufactured in the United States with some parts produced locally in Canada to fulfil Canadian content requirements for Canadian Forces procurement. At the same time, Diesel Division General Motors Canada (DDGM) was nearing completion of LAV-25 production for the United States Marine Corps and was facing the potential of having empty production lines for a year at the Ontario Plant, as they had no additional contracts until 1990 and considered shutting down the plant during that time.

During this time a small team of salesmen and engineers heard about the army program and thought they had a chance to scoop up the contract and supply a vehicle based on the LAV II chassis with the idea that the vehicle would be better suited to the intended reservist role over the M113A3 due to being wheeled compared to the tracked M113 APC, as the vehicles would likely do a large amount of their movement by road within Canada as well as the cheaper operation costs of using a wheeled vehicle for the Reserves.

=== Design, prototype and procurement ===
To convince Land Force Command to purchase the vehicle, two engineers from DDGM began to design the vehicle by working on a small scale model of the LAV II chassis. They cut off the troop compartment and added a large box on the rear half of the vehicle, which increased internal capacity. They replaced the two doors previously used for the troop compartment with a ramp similar to the style found on the M113. This small scale model was then shown to Dallaire, who was not interested in the proposal and continued to support the M113A3 acquisition.

At this point DDGM decided to begin flexing lobbying muscles in 1988 to get the Canadian government to consider the vehicle more seriously. DDGM secured the support of Michael Wilson, the Minister of Finance, as well as members of Mobile Forces Command Headquarters in Saint-Hubert, Quebec. Engineers and executives of DDGM realized they would likely need the support of Dallaire to obtain the contract and decided that the way to win him over would be to build a full-scale prototype vehicle and present it to him. DDGM saw an opportunity to do this at Canadian Forces Base Borden for Armed Forces Day on June 5, 1988, as both Dallaire and Beatty would be attending the event.

The engineers had little time to spare to produce a prototype of the vehicle, and began by starting with a LAV-25 that had been used in tests to judge if the LAV-25 could be airdropped from transport aircraft. Similar to the small scale model, they began by cutting off the troop compartment while keeping the suspension, drive-train, and front half of the vehicle intact. The cut-off area was cut piece by piece and then welded together to create a box on the rear half of the vehicle and was then fitted with a ramp. The turret ring was then replaced with a large folding roof hatch. A raised commander cupola was added on the front left of the vehicle behind the driver.

The entire process to produce the prototype took eight days, after which the "Bison", as named by DDGM, was assembled, painted and ready to be shown. It was driven up to CFB Borden and was presented during the parade on Armed Forces Day. It was considered to be a success, with Beatty coming on board with the idea, but stating that he would not force the army's hand to purchase the Bison over the M113A3.

While the prototype had seemingly won over Beatty, Colonel Dallaire was not convinced and continued to support the M113A3 acquisition, which caused DDGM to send a lobbyist to Ottawa to work on him, making largely the same arguments as DDGM had before, that the Bison would be more cost efficient for operation by the reservists over the tracked M113A3, that the Bison did not face the same restriction for use on roads as the tracked M113, and that the Regular Force would simply reacquisition new M113s, possibly implying that DDGM likely knew that the Regular Force would appropriate the new vehicles for their own use, as they later did with the Bison. Although Colonel Dallaire did not budge, the army sidestepped him and decided to purchase the Bison in July 1989 in the form of 149 "Bison" armoured personnel carriers, 18 "Bison CP" command posts, 16 "Wolf" 81 mm mortar carriers and 16 "MRV Bison" maintenance and recovery vehicles.

The Bison production version differs from the baseline LAV-25 by raising the height of the roof, removing the turret ring, placing a commander's cupola behind the driver, and incorporating a rail mount system in the cargo/passenger compartment to quickly change mission specific equipment. The driver is seated in the front-left of the crew compartment. The commander has a slightly raised position directly behind the driver with access to his own hatch and mounted machine gun. The engine is to the right of the crew compartment.

The Canadian Forces began upgrading the Bison between 2002 and 2008. The upgrades include improved engine power, new torsion bars, fittings for add-on armour, air conditioning, and the VRS respirator system for nuclear, biological and chemical (NBC) defence.

=== Variants ===
The Bison's rail-mount system allows it to be adapted to a variety of roles without any major modifications. Bisons used by the Canadian Forces have been adapted for use as armoured personnel carriers (original configuration – mostly replaced in this role by the LAV III), 81 mm mortar carriers, command post vehicles, field ambulances (32), mobile repair team (MRT) vehicles (32), armoured recovery vehicles (32), airspace coordination centre vehicle, electronic warfare vehicles (25), engineer vehicles equipped with hydraulic tools and NBC reconnaissance vehicles (4).

=== Legacy and operational history ===
The Bison is described by Peter Kasurak as being the first step on the road to the transformation of the Canadian Forces, moving away from primarily tracked armoured vehicles towards wheeled armoured vehicles, setting a trend that is still prevalent. The Bison was seen during various high-profile events during the 1990s and 2000s and is often associated with those periods and conflicts.

It was seen by the public and used by Canadian Forces during the Oka Crisis, the Gulf War as part of the ground security force defending Coalition aircraft, the UN and later NATO missions during the Yugoslav Wars in the form of UNPROFOR, IFOR, SFOR and KFOR, in the United Nations Operation in Somalia II with it being mentioned in the Somalia Affair, and the War in Afghanistan (2001–2021) as part of the ISAF contingent as part of the war on terror.

== Coyote ==
Coyote reconnaissance vehicle
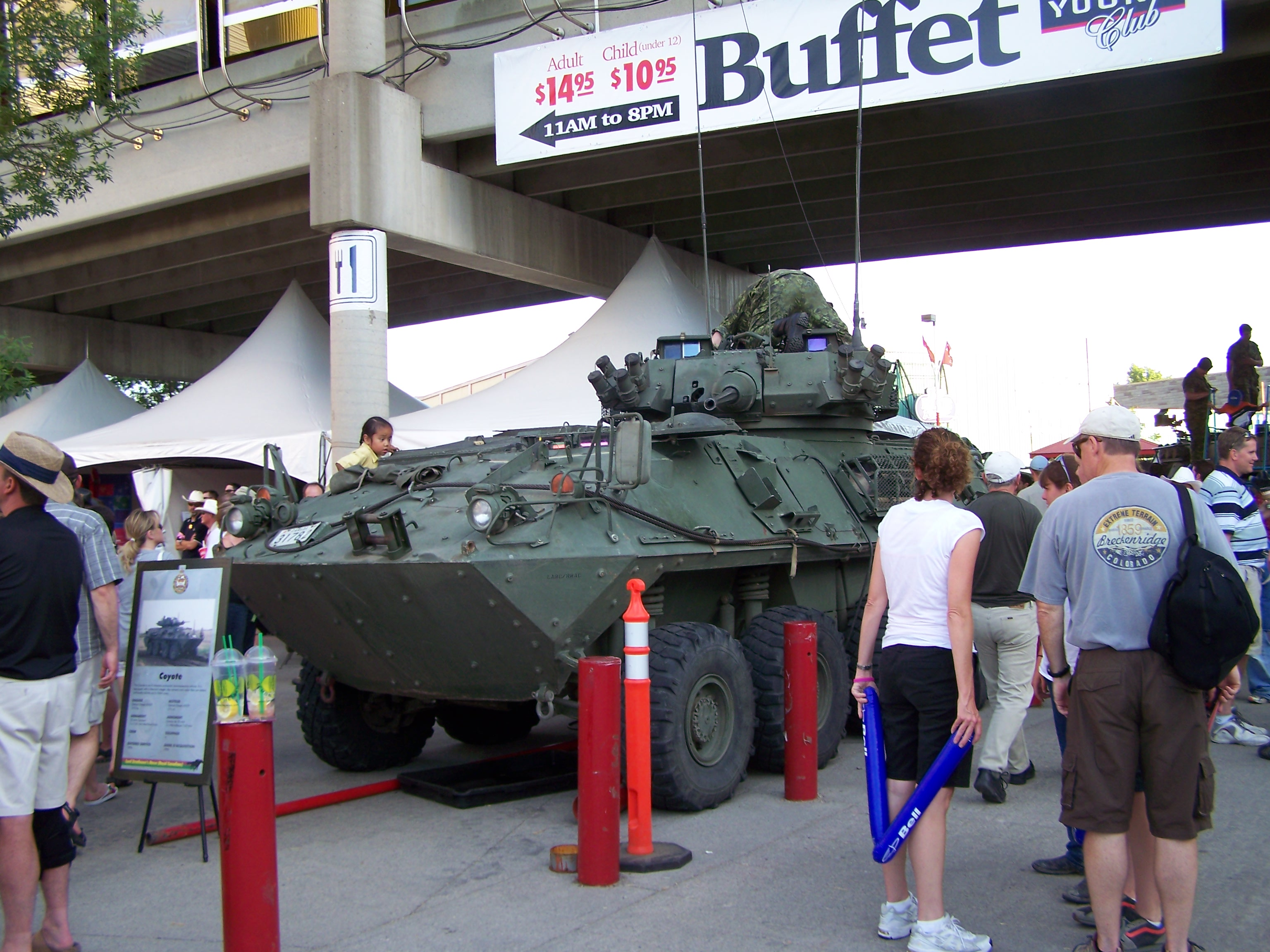
- Canadian light armoured vehicle at the Calgary Stampede
- Type: Armoured car
- Place of origin: Canada

Service history
- In service: 1996–present
- Used by: Canadian Army
- Wars: War in Afghanistan (2001–2021) Yugoslav Wars

Production history
- Designer: General Motors Diesel Division

Specifications
- Mass: 14.4 t (15.9 short tons)
- Length: 6.39 m (21.0 ft)
- Width: 2.50 m (8.2 ft)
- Height: 2.69 m (8.8 ft)
- Crew: 4 (driver, commander, gunner, surveillance suite operator)
- Main armament: 1 × M242 25mm chain gun
- Secondary armament: 1 × C6 7.62mm machine gun (coaxial); 1 × C6 7.62mm machine gun (pintle); 8 × grenade launchers (2 × cluster of 4)
- Engine: Detroit Diesel 6V53T; 275 hp (205 kW)
- Suspension: 8×8 wheeled, 4× drive
- Operational range: 660 km
- Maximum speed: 100 km/h

The Coyote has been in service since 1996 for use in the light reconnaissance scout role. It was initially used in the role of medium tank trainer within armoured cavalry squadrons in the same way as the AVGP Cougar it replaced.

=== Origins ===
The Coyote reconnaissance vehicle is a non-amphibious armoured reconnaissance vehicle based on the design of the LAV-25. The Canadian Forces ordered 203 of the vehicles in 1993 to replace the Lynx reconnaissance vehicle. All were delivered and entered service by 1996. The Coyote originally came in three variants: the "mast" variant with a mast-mounted surveillance system, a variant with a remote surveillance suite, and a basic reconnaissance/command post variant.

=== Armament ===
The Coyote mounts a 25×137mm M242 Bushmaster chain gun and two 7.62×51mm NATO C6 general purpose machine guns in an electrically driven turret. The turret features a laser-warning receiver, and mounts a total of eight grenade launchers in two clusters capable of firing smoke and fragmentation grenades. One of the machine guns is mounted coaxial to the main gun while the other is pintle-mounted in front of the crew commander's hatch.

The main gun is equipped with dual ammunition feeds that allow for separate weapons effects, selectable by the gunner/crew commander. The standard load is a belt of armour-piercing sabot rounds and a belt of HE-T explosive/fragmentation rounds. The main gun and coax machine gun are two-axis stabilized. The turret is equipped with a laser rangefinder, but no ballistic computer. Elevation and lead corrections are applied manually by the gunner using multi-stadia reticules in the day, thermal, and image intensification sights.

=== Protection ===
The standard armour of the Coyote protects against small arms fire, anti-personnel mines, and shrapnel, with add-on armour kits able to protect against larger projectiles. The Coyote is equipped with a suite of devices for detection nuclear, biological, and chemical (NBC) weapons, consisting of a GID-3 chemical detector and an AN/VDR-2 radiation monitor. Each vehicle is equipped with an NBC ventilated respirator system.

=== Sensors ===
The mast-mounted surveillance variants are equipped with a mast-mounted surveillance system that can be raised to 10 meters above the ground. This system includes the AN/PPS-5C MSTAR Version 3 surface surveillance radar and an electro-optical/infrared surveillance system with a long-range video camera and laser rangefinder. The remote surveillance variant consists of two tripod-mounted systems capable of being deployed up to 200 meters away from the vehicle. The surveillance systems can detect tank-sized targets at up to 12 kilometres away, and large truck-sized targets at up to 24 kilometres. In good conditions the visual surveillance system can detect personnel up to 20 kilometres away.

=== Mobility ===
The Coyote is powered by a Detroit Diesel 6V53T engine developing 275 horsepower (205 kW), and can reach speeds of 100 kilometres per hour (62 mph) on road. The Coyote has a maximum road range of 660 kilometres (410 mi). Each vehicle is equipped with a tactical navigation system that includes a GPS receiver, a digital compass system, and a backup dead-reckoning system.

A 15-tonne capacity hydraulic winch is fitted to every vehicle to aid in self-recovery. Unlike the LAV-25, the Coyote is equipped with extra fuel tanks in place of amphibious equipment. The Coyote is air-transportable on Hercules C-130 aircraft when the turret is removed.

=== Variants ===
Coyotes come in three variants: Command, Mast, and Remote. The Mast and Remote variants have a sophisticated suite of electronic surveillance equipment including radar, video, and infrared surveillance night vision devices. The mast variant has this equipment mounted on a 10-metre telescoping mast that can be extended to raise the surveillance suite out from behind cover. The remote variant of the Coyote has its surveillance suite mounted on two short tripods, which crew can deploy remotely using a 200-metre spool of cable.

When first purchased, the Coyote was designated for service with both the Regular Force and Reserve Force, with the Mast variants earmarked for the Regular units and the Remotes designated for the Reserves. Shortly after taking delivery of the vehicles, but before they were assigned to the Reserve units, all Coyotes were reassigned to the Regular Force.

=== Service history ===
Since the introduction of the Coyote to the Canadian Armed Forces, the vehicle has been used domestically and abroad. The Coyote was deployed during the United Nations / NATO missions in Bosnia and Herzegovina, Macedonia, Kosovo, and in Afghanistan. Domestically, it was deployed during Operation Grizzly to Kananaskis to secure the 28th G8 summit, the 36th G8 summit, and the G-20 Toronto summit, in addition to a number of domestic emergencies. As of 2015–2022, the Coyote was in the midst of a planned retirement and being replaced by a mix of TAPV and LAV VI armoured vehicles. The Armed Forces of Ukraine received 64 Coyotes in December 2024 from Canada.

== Operators ==
As of January 2025, the number of Bison vehicles in use were

- Australia | Australian Army – 97 (See ASLAV Type II)
- Canada | Canadian Army – 56 LAV-25 Coyote and 155 LAV Bison (including EW, ambulance, repair & recovery variants)
- Ukraine | Ukrainian Ground Forces – During the 28th meeting of the Ukraine Defense Contact Group, Canadian Minister of National Defence David J. McGuinty announced that Ukraine will receive the Coyote and Bison platforms.
- United States | US National Guard – 12 (for use against the illegal drug trade)

== See also ==
- LAV III – Canadian infantry fighting vehicle. Replaced the Bison in many roles.
