= VS-HCT mine =

The VS-HCT series of mines are Italian plastic cased anti-tank mines that use Misznay Schardin effect warheads and have a dual seismic and magnetic fuze. The mines are no longer produced and differ in size and shape.

== VS-HCT ==
The VS-HCT has a circular case with vertical ribbing. The mine can be either mechanically laid or laid by hand and incorporates both electronic and mechanical arming delays. The mine's fuze has a battery-powered seismic sensor which is used to detect approaching targets, plus a magnetic sensor which triggers the mine at the optimum point. Once triggered the mine fires a clearing charge, which clears up to 100 millimeters of earth that may have been laid on top of the mine. Once the clearing charge has been fired, the main charge is triggered. The main charge throws a heavy metal slug upwards, which is capable of penetrating up to 175 millimeters of armour.

A self neutralizing period of between 1 and 128 days can be selected. The mine's status can also be checked remotely. It has provision for the fitting of an anti-handling device.

The mine entered series production by the Italian company, Valsella, in 1978 and was in service with the Italian army. The mine is no longer produced, but has been reported in Iraq.

== VS-HCT2 ==
The VS-HCT2 was developed to meet NATO and FINABEL requirements for anti-tank mines. The mine has a square plastic case with a chunky carrying handle set into one corner, with a large raised circular section in the centre of the mine. The electronic fuze is more sophisticated than the VS-HCT, able to discriminate between types of targets, and can vehicle count to strike a particular vehicle. In testing the mine's warhead penetrated 50 millimeters of armour half a meter above the mine, followed by five 25 millimeter witness plates. The mine can self-neutralize after a pre-set period and incorporates an anti-handling device.

The mine is no longer in production.

== VS-HCT4 ==
The VS-HCT4 was a development of the VS-HCT2 with a case designed to aid mechanical mine laying. The mine's plastic case is rectangular with rounded ends. The mine's warhead and fuze are similar to the type used in the VS-HCT2, with similar performance characteristics. Physically the mine is somewhat similar to the French ADWAT and MI AC PR series of mines.

== Specifications ==
| Model | VS-HCT | VS-HCT-2 | VS-HCT-4 |
|---|---|---|---|
| Length / diameter | 222 mm | 260 mm | 280 mm |
| Height | 110 mm | 128 mm | 104 mm |
| Width | - | 260 mm | 188 mm |
| Weight | 4 kg | 6.8 kg | 5.5 kg |
| Explosive content | 2.05 kg of Composition B | 2.3 kg of Composition B | 2.3 kg of Composition B |
