= MOWAG Roland =

Swiss armored personnel carrier

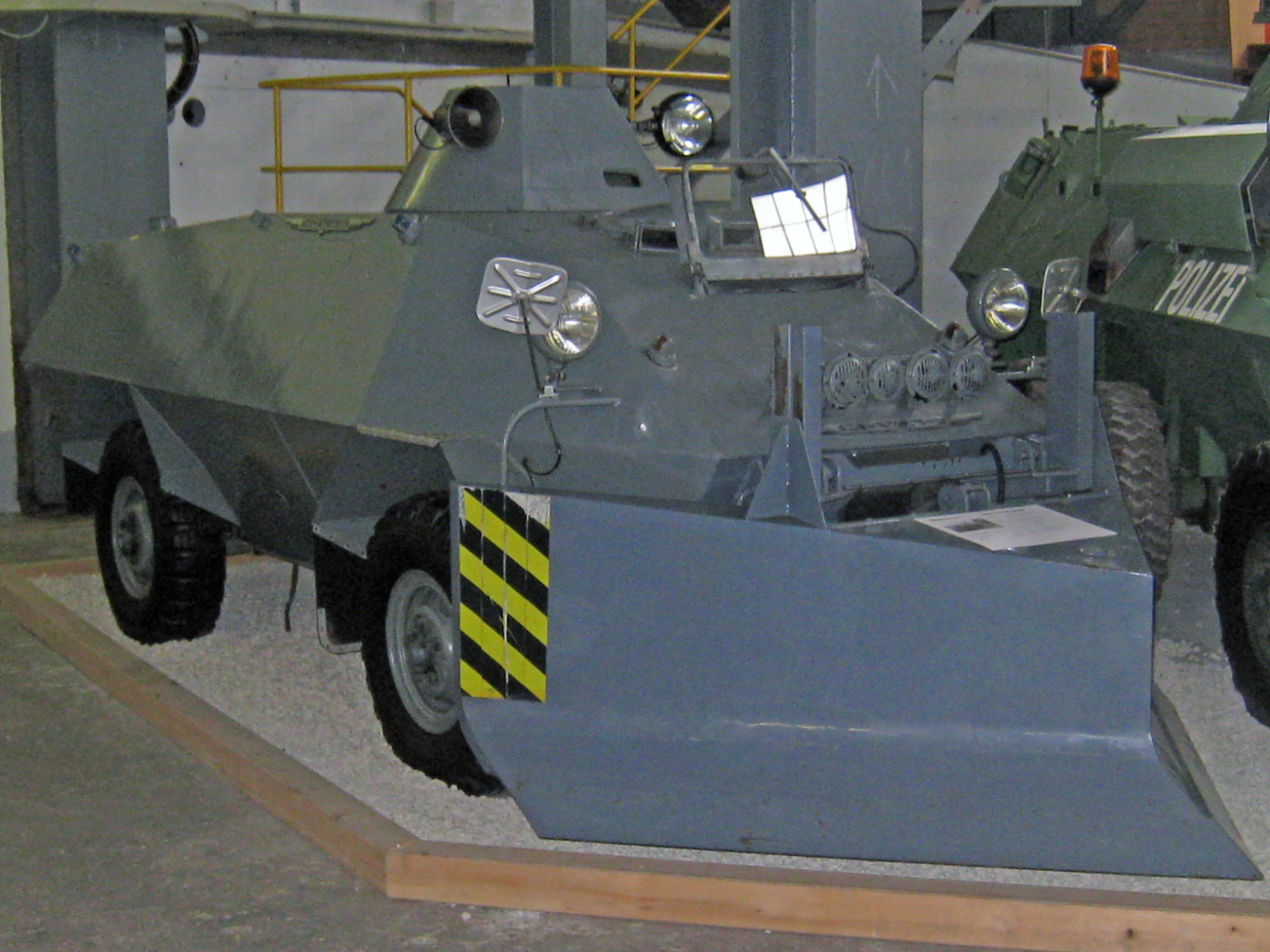
- MOWAG Roland Kantonspolizei Bern
- Place of origin: Switzerland

Service history
- Used by: Switzerland, Germany, Mexico, Peru, Argentina, Bolivia, Chile, Greece, Iraq

Production history
- Manufacturer: MOWAG
- Produced: 1964–1980
- No. built: > 500
- Variants: Military version, Police Version

Specifications
- Mass: 4,400 kg (9,700 lb)
- Length: 4.73 m (186 in)
- Width: 2.05 m (81 in)
- Height: 2.1 m (83 in)
- Crew: 1 driver + 1 commander + 4 passengers
- Main armament: Customer Specific machine guns
- Secondary armament: modification with unguided rockets
- Engine: V 8 Chrysler LA 318-3; 160 hp
- Transmission: NP 435 mechanical gears 4 forward gears 1 reverse
- Suspension: 4x4 wheeled
- Maximum speed: 100 km/h (62 mph)

The MOWAG Roland is an armoured personnel carrier of Swiss origin. The vehicle was developed in 1960 and the prototype was tested in 1963. The Roland production was from 1964 to 1980.

== Design ==
The Roland was designed for a variety of tasks: ambulance, reconnaissance, armoured troop carriers, riot /protests control and as rocket launcher.

There is a searchlight mounted on the front, directly behind it is a rotary roof section for a machine gun (MG) or a tower for a heavy machine gun MG, which is operated by the commander. The engine is in the rear, on the left side of the vehicle. On the right side, in the rear and on the left side of the vehicle are doors fitted for the vehicle occupants to enter or exit.

Some African operators have their MOWAG Roland equipped with multiple rocket launchers for 5 unguided rockets. MOWAG Roland vehicles for police units typically do not have a gun, but are equipped with a siren, blue light, searchlight, loud speakers and a V-shaped dozer blade.

=== Variants ===
- Versions: armoured ambulance, standard Army APC, riot and crowd control vehicle, SANDF variant with rockets
- Armament: Customer Specific assault rifle or machine gun like cal.50 HMG or a cal.30 Browning, or M60, GMPG light machine guns

== Operators ==
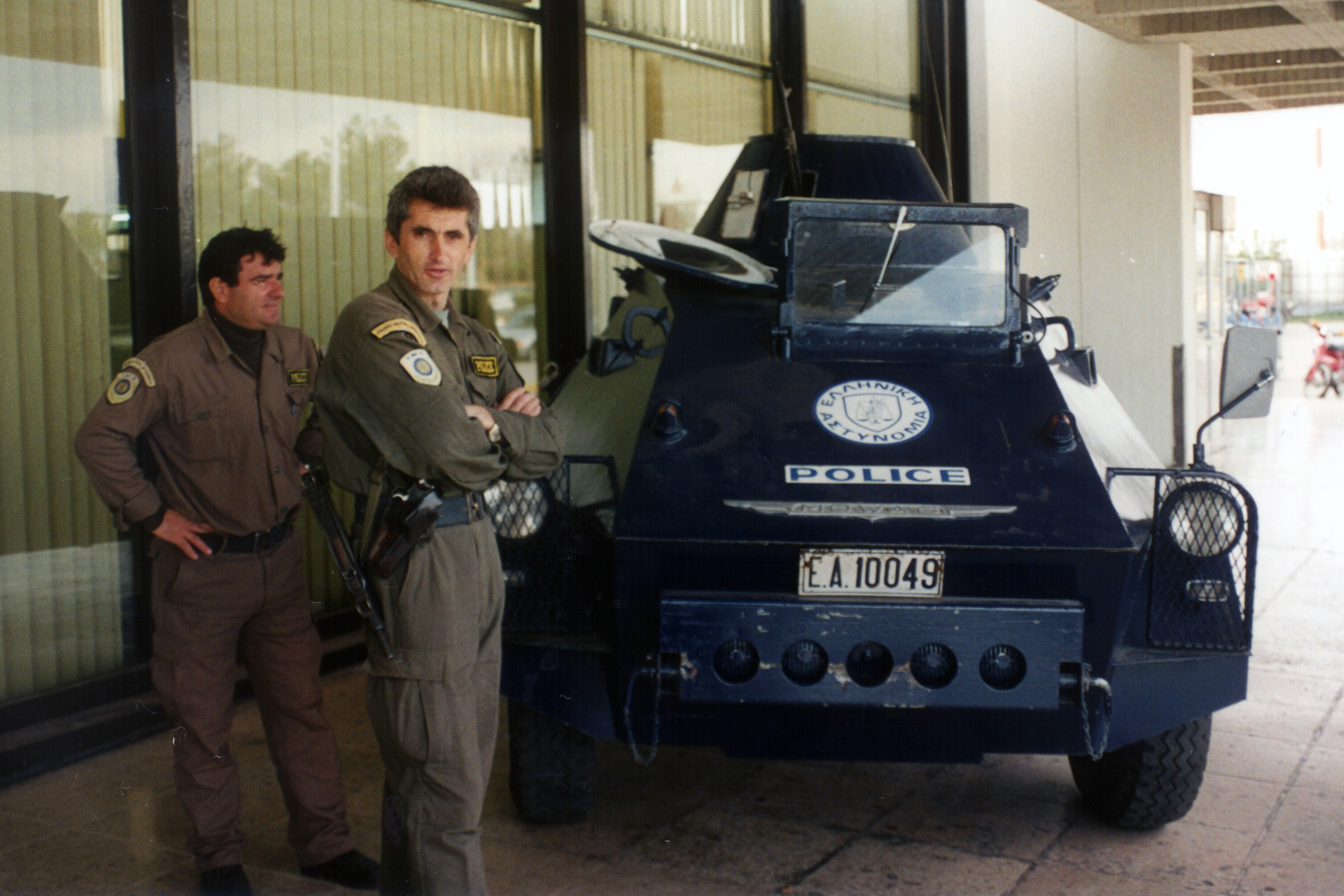
Greek police with a MOWAG Roland in 1995

Over 500 Mowag Rolands were produced and shipped to countries like Argentina, Bolivia, Chile, Greece (army and police), Mexico, Peru and in various Police Departments in Switzerland.

=== Operators list ===
Mexican Army (30)

- 25 APC
  Ordered in 1976, with a turret equipped with a FN MAG 7.62×51mm NATO
- 5 MLRS ATATL
  Order in 1976

== On display ==
The Schweizerisches Militärmuseum Full has a display of a Roland MOWAG from the Bern Cantonal Police. This model is exhibited with a plow attached and was in use until 1997.

== See also ==
=== Comparable vehicles ===
- Berliet VXB-170 – (France)
- BRDM-1 – (Soviet Union)
- BRDM-2 – (Soviet Union)
- Cadillac Gage Commando – (United States)
- Condor (APC) – (West Germany)
- Fiat 6614 – (Italy)
- FUG / OT-65 – (Hungarian People's Republic)
- Mowag MR 8 – (Switzerland)
- MOWAG Piranha 4x4 IB – (Switzerland)
- Mowag Spy – (Switzerland)
- Panhard M3 – (France)
