= VS-N fuzed mines =

Italian blast mine

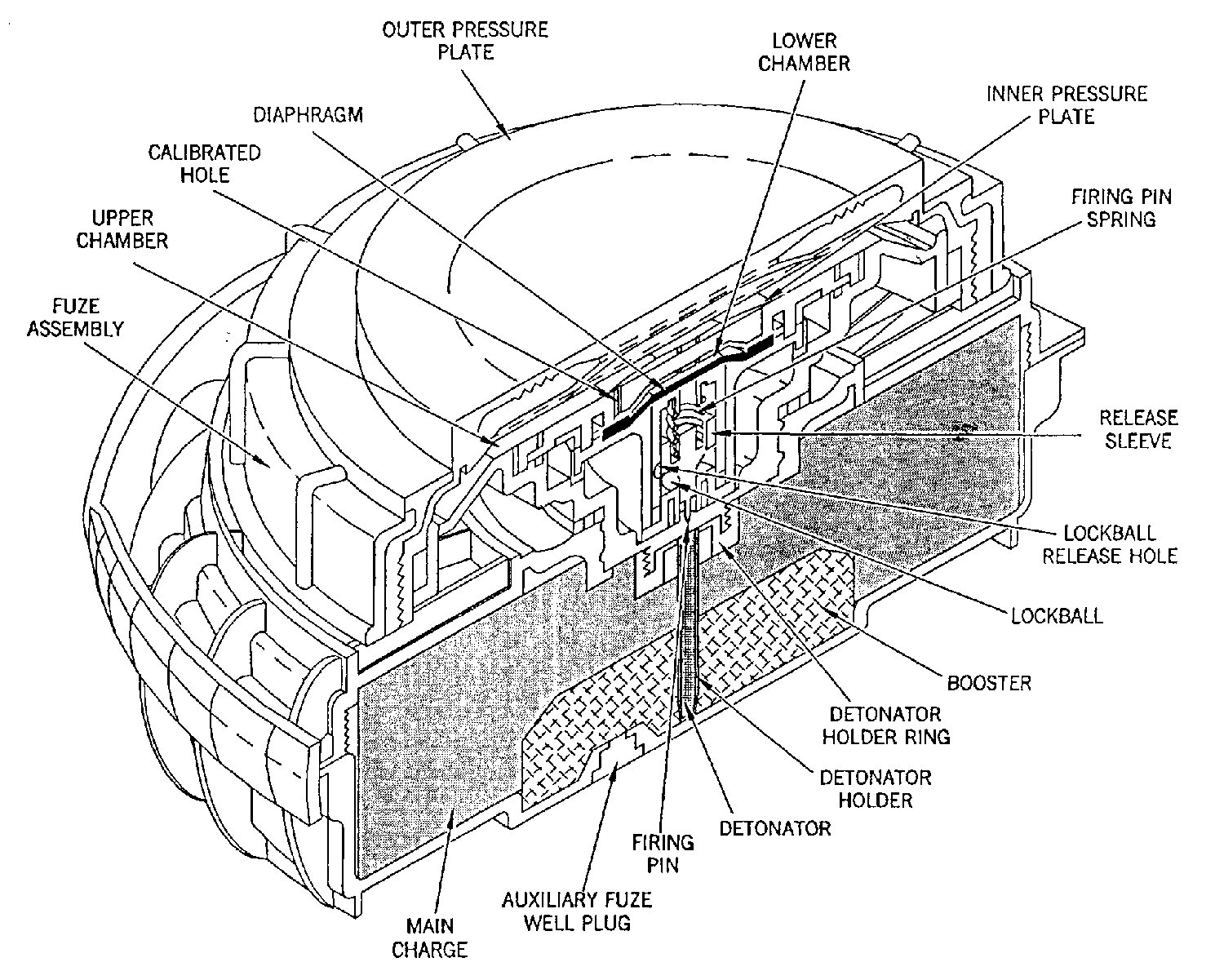
A cutaway of a VS-2.2 landmine.

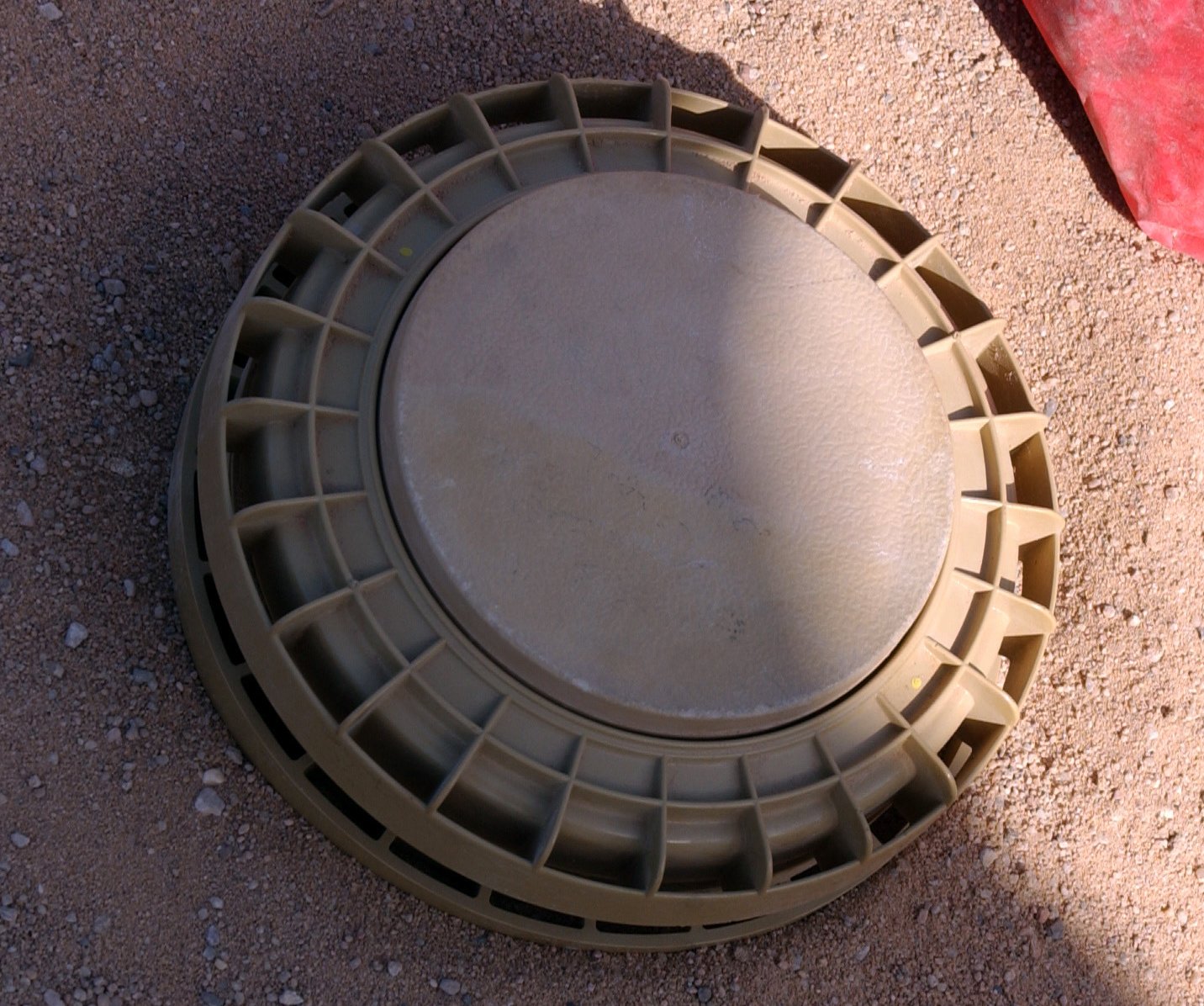
A VS-2.2 landmine found in Iraq in 2004.

The VS-2.2, VS-3.6 and SH-55 are Italian circular plastic cased anti-tank blast mines that use the VS-N series fuze. They have very few metal components and are resistant to overpressure and shock. The VS-2.2 and VS-3.6 can also be deployed from helicopters. It was produced by Valsella Meccanotecnica and Singapore, but production has ceased. The VS-2.2 and VS-3.6 are essentially the same, the VS-3.6 being slightly larger, the SH-55 is larger still and has a more rounded appearance. A smaller mine, the VS-1.6 also uses the same fuze.

== Description ==
The mines are normally olive green or sand coloured and are circular. The VS-2.2 and VS-3.6 consist of a ribbed main body containing the main charge and a large circular VS-N fuze which sits on top. The SH-55 is larger, and the circular main body is not as ribbed, it uses the same VS-N fuze as the other mines.

The VS-N fuze is air pressure driven with pressure on the top plate of the mine forcing air into a diaphragm which exerts pressure on the striker until a retaining ball is forced into a recess. Shocks from overpressure are too short to inflate the diaphragm, this requires gradual pressure giving even greater resistance to shock.

This mine has a secondary fuze well on the bottom (where it cannot be seen) which is slightly off-set from the centre of the mine. This secondary fuze well can easily be fitted with pull-fuze which functions as an anti-handling device.

The main charge of the VS-2.2 is relatively small for an anti-tank mine, so it would tend to disable rather than destroy vehicles, however the VS-3.6 and SH-55 may penetrate the hull of armoured vehicles.

The VS-2.2 mine is found in Iraq and Kuwait, the SH-55 is found in Afghanistan.

== Specifications ==
Mine	VS-2.2	VS-3.6	SH-55
Weight	3.5 kg	5 kg	7.3 kg
Explosive content	2.2 kg of Composition B	4 kg of Composition B	5.5 kg of Composition B
Diameter	230 mm	248 mm	280 mm
Height	115 mm		122 mm
Operating pressure	180 to 220 kg		
