= Colleferro =

Colleferro Comune di Colleferro
- Comune
- Comune of Colleferro
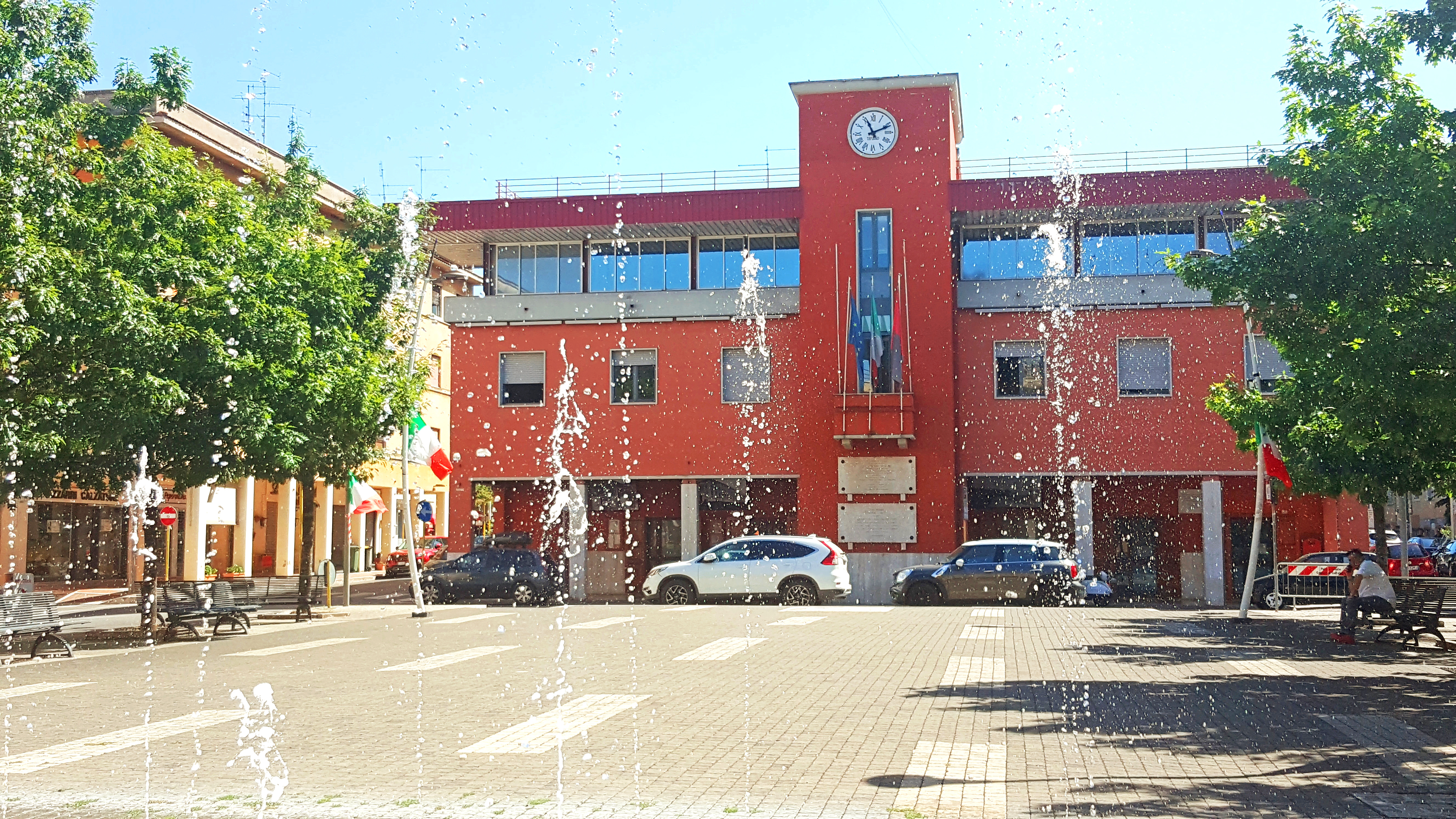
- The Town Hall.

- Coat of arms

- Shows the location of the Comune di Colleferro in the Province of Rome.

- Location within Italy Location within Lazio
- Coordinates: 41°44′N 13°01′E
- Country: Italy
- Region: Lazio
- Metropolitan city: Rome (RM)

Government
  - Mayor: Pierluigi Sanna (RiparTIAMO Colleferro)

Area
  - Total: 27 km^{2} (10 sq mi)
- Elevation: 218 m (715 ft)

Population (31 December 2020)
  - Total: 20,698
  - Density: 770/km^{2} (2,000/sq mi)
- Demonym: Colleferrini
- Time zone: UTC+1 (CET)
  - Summer (DST): UTC+2 (CEST)
- Postal code: 00034
- Dialing code: 06
- ISTAT code: 058034
- Patron saint: St. Barbara
- Saint day: 4 December
- Website: Official website

Colleferro (Italian pronunciation: [kɔlleˈfɛrro]) is a small town with 20,698 inhabitants of the Metropolitan City of Rome in the Lazio region of central Italy. It is a residential zone with many different industries and sports structures. It borders the province of Frosinone.

== Geography ==
Colleferro is located near the Sacco River in the Sacco Valley.

== History ==
Appian and Plutarch describe a decisive battle in the Civil War against Gaius Marius the Younger, which took place in 82 BC at Colleferro, concluded in favor of Sulla. At the end of the siege, Marius committed suicide.

At Colleferro, Italian patriot Enrico Toti, on 27 March 1908, had his left leg crushed. The train was stopped at the station to be joined by the Colleferro train. Toti was lubricating the engine of the locomotive and, when the locomotive moved, he slipped causing his left leg to be trapped and crushed by the gears.

The development of the town began as early as 1912 with the conversion of a long-disused sugar factory (the Valsacco factory) to a gunpowder and explosive factory. Initially, the town developed away from where the center is today; the first few buildings (including the Church of St. Joachim) were built within the territory of the nearby town of Valmontone, near the train station that was then called "Segni-Paliano", and was renamed "Colleferro-Segni-Paliano Station" after the birth of the town.

The engineer Leopoldo Parodi Delfino (former senator and son of the founder of the National Bank, then Bank of Italy) and Senator Giovanni Bombrini founded the Bombrini Parodi Delfino (BPD) gunpowder and explosives factory. Nearby, a new "BPD Village" was created, and factory workers and their families from throughout Italy moved into them. Later, a cement factory opened (the "Lime & Cement Segni", subsequently acquired by Italcementi), using materials quarried from the nearby town of Segni.

Colleferro continued growing throughout the 1920s and 1930s with still within the municipality of Valmontone. In 1935 Colleferro was incorporated as a new city. Later, Colleferro incorporated portions of the neighboring municipalities of Segni and Paliano.

On 29 January 1938, there was a massive explosion at the Bombrini Parodi Delfino (BPD). 59 people were killed. The damage was so severe that the news was reported even in the British Times. Within about three hours with of the explosion, the king, Victor Emmanuel III, Benito Mussolini, along with government and military officials, were in Colleferro to see what happened, visiting the wounded, and planning what to do for the wounded and the town.

During World War II, the Allies repeatedly bombarded Colleferro to destroy the explosives factory. During the attacks, citizens found shelter in a series of caves and tunnels built under the "BPD Village". The air-raid shelters, residues of World War II, where some 1,500 civilians found shelter during the bombing, most of the "refuge" is still open on the feast of St. Barbara (4 December), patron of the town.

In the early 1950s, BPD manufactured Lauryl, the first soap powder in Italy.

On 9 October 2007 one person was killed and eight were injured in an explosion at a weapons factory belonging to Italian company Simmel Difesa.

== Twinning ==
Colleferro is twinned with:

- Colmenar Viejo, Spain

== Main sights ==
Colleferro is home to the following churches:

- Church of Santa Barbara, designed by engineer Riccardo Morandi, located in the city center
- Church of the Immaculate
- Church of San Bruno
- Church of St. Joachim, the oldest church, located in Colleferro Scalo
- Temple of Santa Barbara
- Church of St. Benedict
- Temple of Saint Anne

== Economy ==
=== Agriculture ===
The territory has always been an agricultural vocation. From 2006 is in the "Rural and agro-energy District of the Valley of the Latins".

As part of the redevelopment of the Valle del Sacco was initiated an experiment in "non-food crops" (crops not for food). The crops will be sunflower for the biodiesel and poplars to power boilers biomass.

As for the livestock, the environmental crisis had forced the slaughter of livestock and destruction of health protection for milk in all farms in the area. The farm has since rebounded with numerous protections for consumers.

=== Industry ===
The development of Colleferro is linked from the beginning to its industrial vocation, with the opening of explosives factory Bombrini Parodi Delfino (BDP), to which were added numerous chemical and textile plants. The industrial area of Colleferro spreads over 1000 hectares of land, mostly owned by Se.co.svim.

Some of the companies in the territory are or have been: SNIA S.p.A.; Italcementi for the production of pozzolan and building materials; Caffaro Ketones, Caffaro Benzoin, and Se.co.svim in the chemical sector; Alstom and RFI for the construction and repair of railway cars. Among the companies working with advanced technology, Avio operates in the aerospace sector. Simmel Difesa, now KNDS France, is in the defense industry.

== Sport ==
Colleferro includes the following sport venues:

- Municipal Stadium Maurizio Natali: About 2000 seats, covered. Hosts Colleferro Rugby and athletics. Grass pitch.
- Municipal Stadium Andrea Caslini. 960 seats, covered. Hosts SS Colleferro calcio, town main football club. AstroTurf.
- Campo Di Giulio Bruno. Football. 500 Seats uncovered. Astroturf
- Indoor arena Alfredo Romboli. 5 a side football, basketball and volleyball. Holds about 2000 seats.
- Municipal Swimming Pool.
- Field Archery
- Bowls Hall
