= SNORA and SURA-D rockets =

SNORA
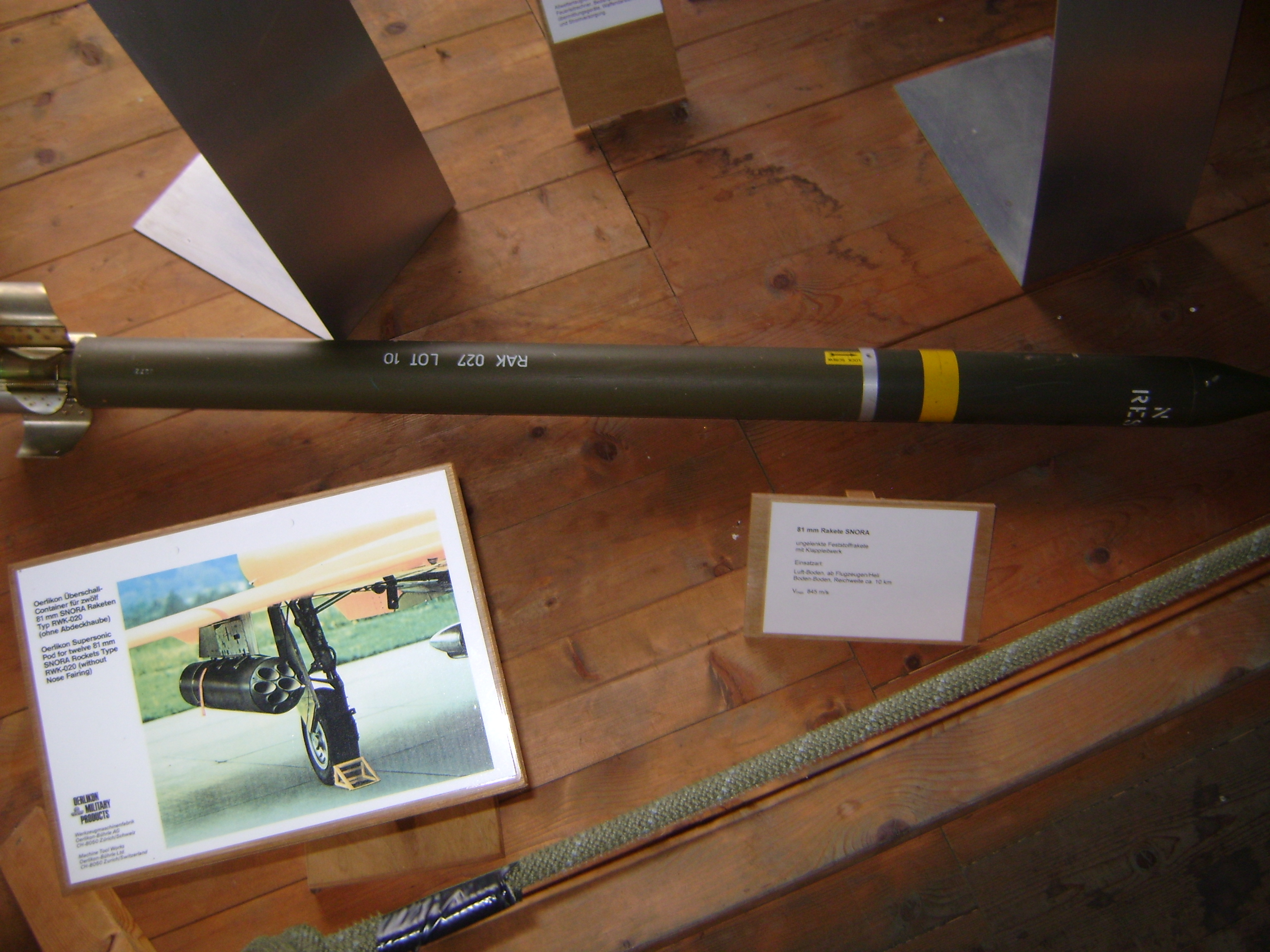
- SNORA at Museum Full
- Type: Unguided air-to-surface and surface-to-surface rocket
- Place of origin: Switzerland

Service history
- In service: 1980s
- Used by: Swiss Air Force

Production history
- Manufacturer: Oerlikon-Bührle
- Variants: High-explosive fragmentation and hollow-charge

Specifications
- Mass: See table
- Length: Varies by model
- Caliber: 81-mm warhead
- Muzzle velocity: See table
- Maximum firing range: 10 kilometers

SURA-D
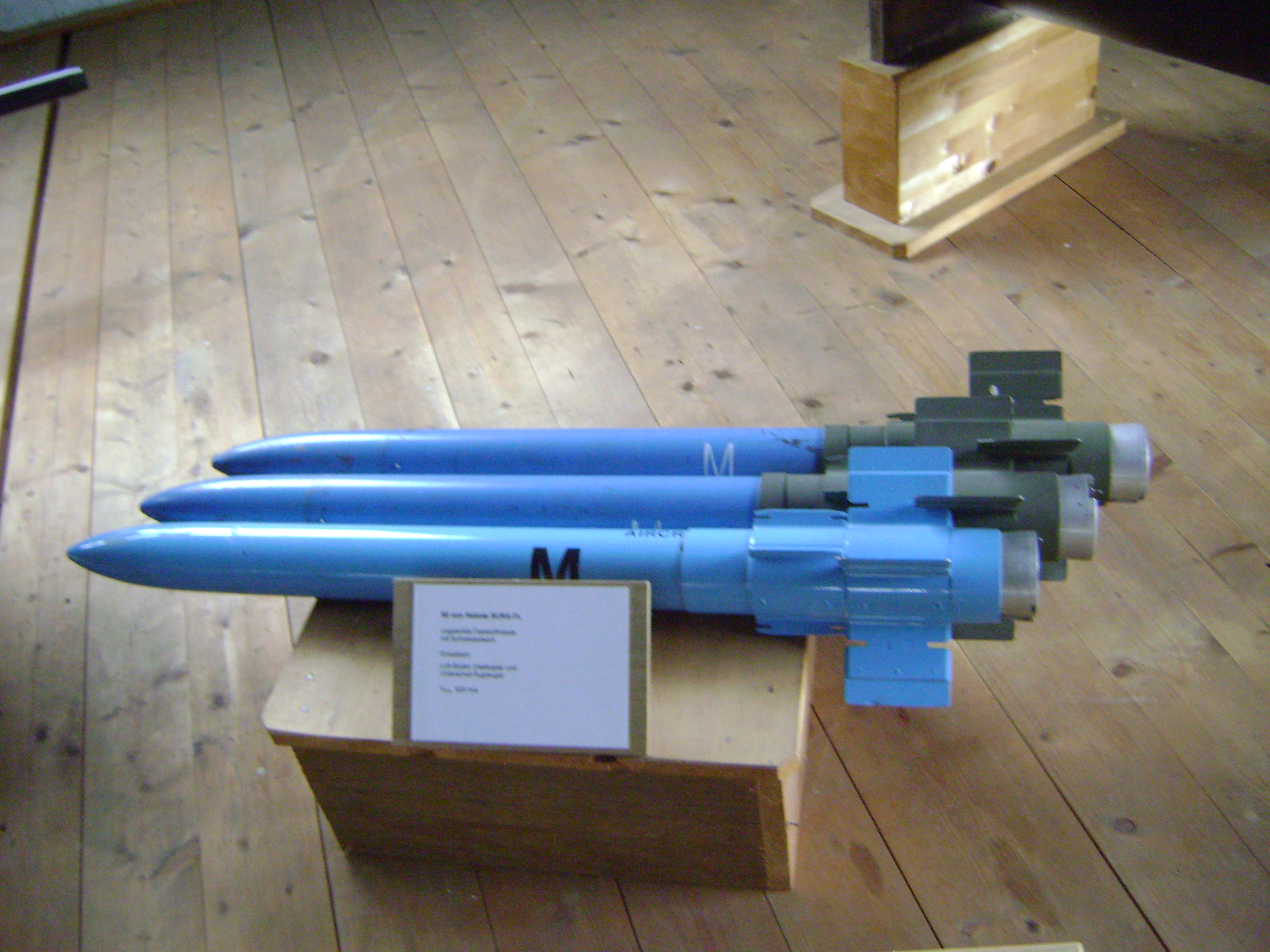
- SURA at Museum Full
- Type: Unguided air-to-surface rocket
- Place of origin: Switzerland

Service history
- In service: 1970s - present
- Used by: Swiss Air Force; Chilean Air Force

Production history
- Designer: SNIA/Oerlikon-Buhrle
- Manufacturer: Oerlikon-Bührle
- Variants: High-explosive fragmentation, hollow-charge, incendiary, marker, and training

Specifications
- Mass: See table
- Length: Varies by model
- Caliber: 80-mm warhead
- Muzzle velocity: See table
- Maximum firing range: 2.5 kilometers

The Oerlikon-Bührle SNORA and SURA-D are 81-mm and 80-mm rockets developed in Switzerland in the late 1970s and fielded in the 1980s. The SNORA could be used in both air-to-surface and surface-to-surface rocket artillery roles, while the SURA-D is an air-to-surface rocket. The SNORA was developed as a cooperative endeavor with the Italian firm SNIA-Viscosa (later SNIA-BPD).

== History ==
The original version of the SURA rocket, the SURA 80R, was developed by Hispano-Suiza in the 1960s. In 1971 Oerlikon-Buhrle took over the military division of Hispano-Suiza and redesignated the SURA 80R, the SURA-FL, and further developed the SURA-FL which is the current SURA-D. (Note: "SURA" refers to the method of hanging the rockets in a vertical array on an aircraft.) The SNORA rockets can be fired from either a supersonic or subsonic aircraft. The SURA-D though, is limited to subsonic aircraft.

Oerlikon also developed the RWK 014, a surface-to-surface launcher for the type SNORA rockets. The RWK 014 has dual launchers of 15 tubes each and has been mounted on the MOWAG Tornado APC as well as the M113 armored personnel carrier. The RWK 014 can fire 10 rounds per second and has a reload time of six minutes.

The SNORA rocket was still in service as late as 1998 and the SURA-D is still in operational use. SNORA rockets are launched from a variety of pods housing from either six or twelve rockets, while SURA-D rockets are mounted as a vertical array with only the top-most rocket attached to an aircraft hardpoint. In this system, rockets are fired individually from the bottom of the tier to the top. The unique sliding fixed fin arrangement of the SURA-D acts as the forward hanger for the rocket below it. As the rocket is fired, the four fixed fins mounted on a ring slide down the body till they are stopped at the expansion area of the rocket motor nozzle and are locked in place. The SURA-D increased its accuracy by the addition of flutes inside the nozzle rear to give a low rotation rate in addition to the stabilization effected by four fixed fins which take effect shortly after launch.

== Overview ==
The 80-mm hollow-charge warhead on the SURA-D has been demonstrated by Oerlikon to penetrate 33 cm (13 in) of armor. The SNORA rocket can mount one of two hollow-charge warheads, either the RAK 026 which can penetrate 35 cm (14 in) of armor, or the RAK 054, capable of penetrating 45 cm (18 in) of armor.

Both rockets were exported by Switzerland and adopted by other nations, among them Spain, Qatar, Philippines and Botswana. Italy later used the motor of the SNORA rocket as the basis for the development of the 81-mm Medusa rocket.

== Variants ==
External images
- SNORA and SURA-D rockets
- SNORA pod Swiss AF MIRAGE IIIS
- SURA-D rockets Swiss AF Hunter
- SURA-D rocket showing launch example of fins used for mounting
- RWK 014 installed on M113 APC

SNORA rockets
	RAK 023 HE FRAG	RAK 024 HE FRAG	RAK 025 HE FRAG	RAK 026/054 HC	RAK 022 TNG
Warhead weight	4.5 kg (9.9 lb)	7 kg (15 lb)	11 kg (24 lb)	4.5 kg (9.9 lb)	7 kg (15 lb)
Explosive	1 kg (2.2 lb)	1.7 kg (3.7 lb)	2.8 kg (6.2 lb)	1 kg (2.2 lb)	none
Weight of propulsion unit	8.7 kg (19 lb)				
Complete rocket	13.2 kg (29 lb)	15.7 kg (35 lb)	19.7 kg (43 lb)	13.2 kg (29 lb)	15.7 kg (35 lb)
Velocity, m/s	820	670	520	820 / 920	670

SURA-D rockets
	RAK 053 HE FRAG	RAK 050 HE FRAG	RAK 052 HE-I	RAK 047 HC	RAK 049 MKR	RAK 051 TNG	RAK 048 TNG
Warhead weight	3 kg (6.6 lb)	4.5 kg (9.9 lb)	3 kg (6.6 lb)	3 kg (6.6 lb)	4.5 kg (9.9 lb)	3 kg (6.6 lb)	4.5 kg (9.9 lb)
Explosive	0.87 kg (1.9 lb)	1.0 kg (2.2 lb)	1.5 kg (3.3 lb)	0.7 kg (1.5 lb)	n/a	none	none
Weight of propulsion unit	8.4 kg (19 lb)						
Complete rocket	11.4 kg (25 lb)	12.9 kg (28 lb)	11.4 kg (25 lb)	11.4 kg (25 lb)	12.9 kg (28 lb)	11.4 kg (25 lb)	12.9 kg (28 lb)
Velocity	530–595 m/s (1,740–1,950 ft/s)						

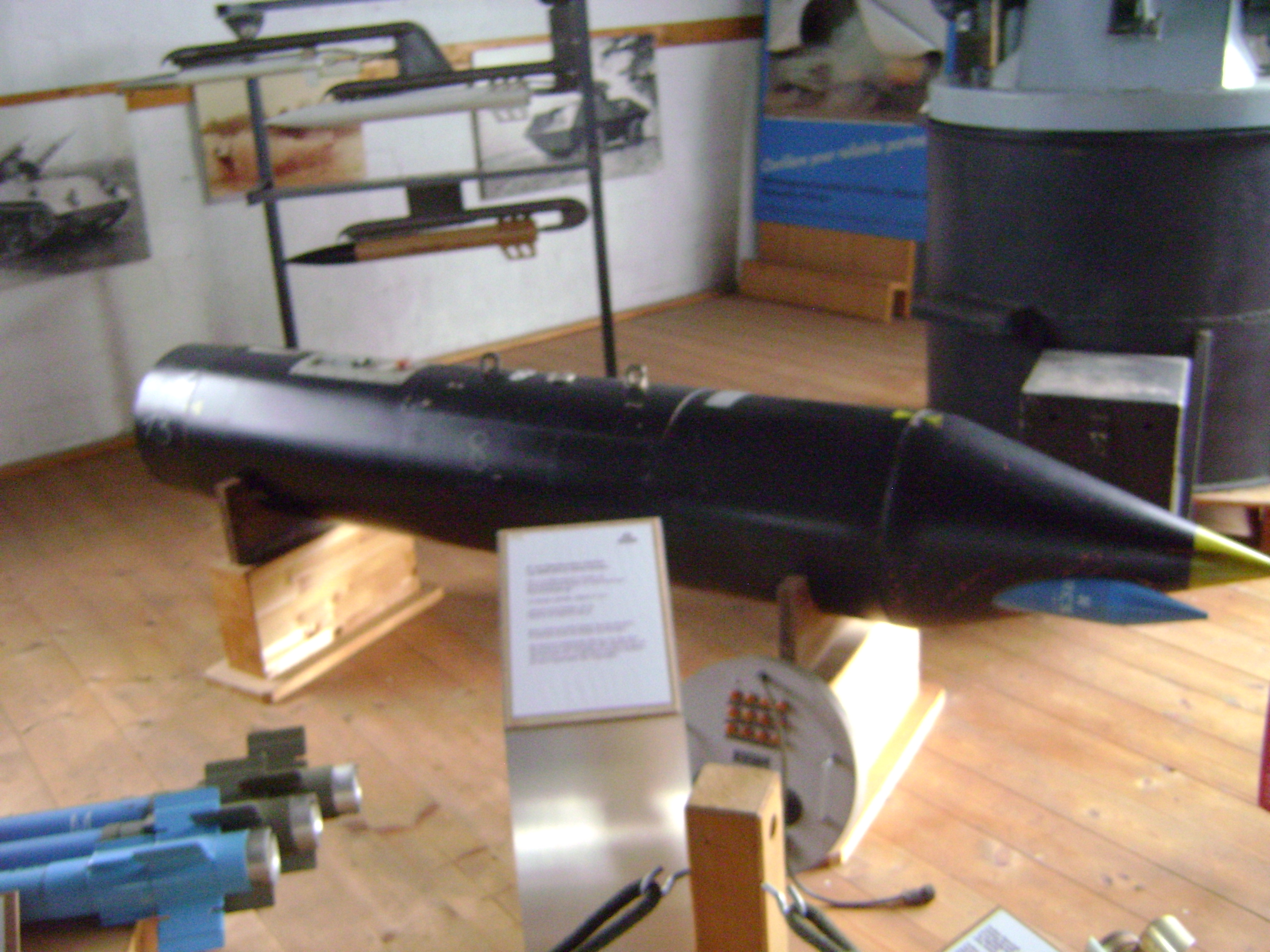
Oerlikon Supersonic Pod for 12 81mm SNORA Rockets Type RWK-020

Designation

- HE FRAG: High Explosive Fragmentation
- HE-I: High Explosive - Incendiary
- HC: Hollow Charge (HEAT)
- MKR: Marker
- TNG: Practice

== See also ==
- Swiss Military Museum
