= Swiss Military Museum =

Museum in Full-Reuenthal (Switzerland)

Coordinates: 47.6086°N 8.1919°E

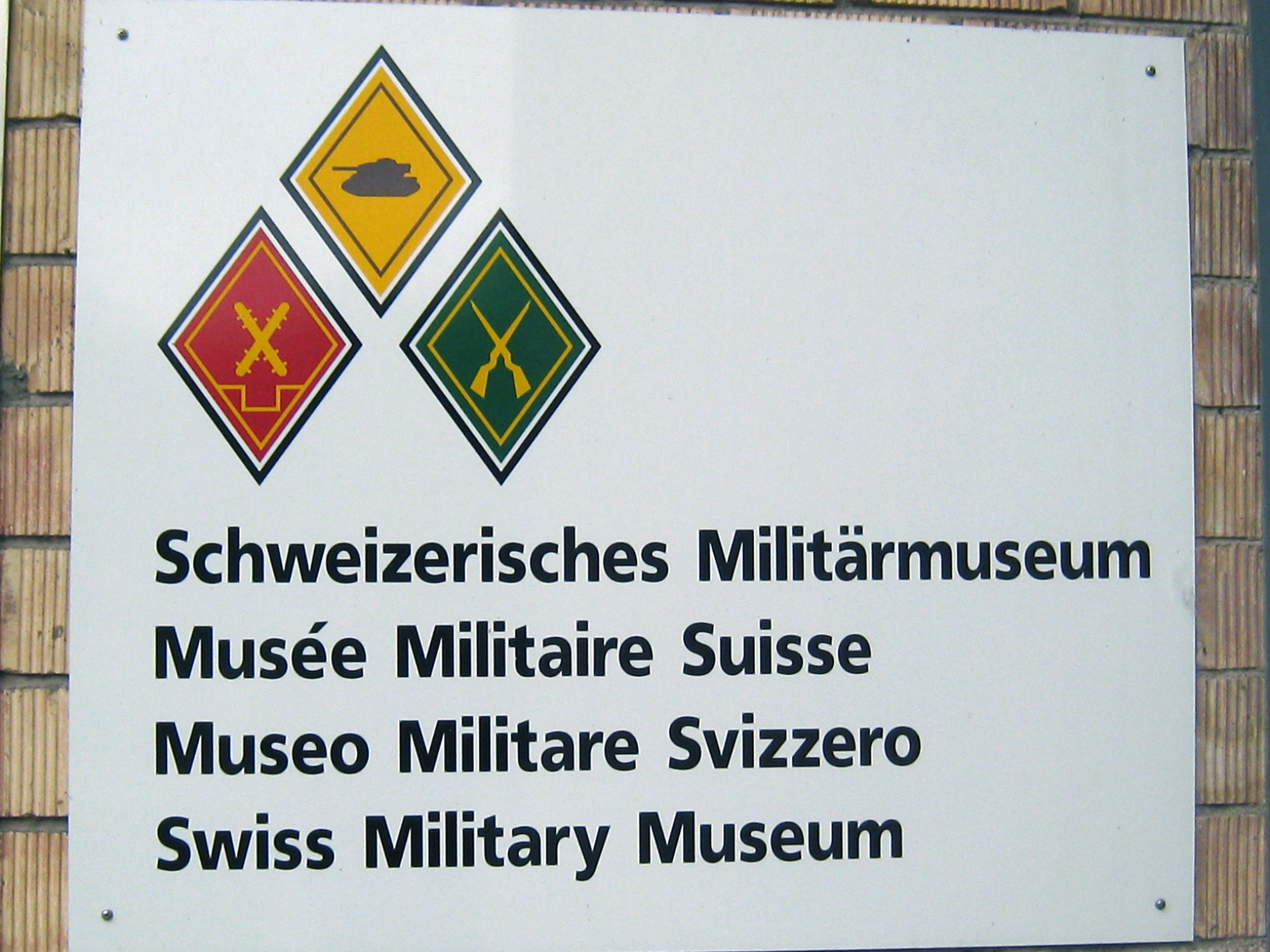

The Swiss Military Museum (German: Schweizerisches Militärmuseum Full) is located at Full-Reuenthal in the Canton of Aargau.

== History of the museum ==
The origins of the museum go back to the Verein zur Förderung eines wehrtechnischen Museums ("Association for the Promotion of a Military Museum"), which was founded by Thomas Hug and friends. In 1989, the Festungsmuseum Reuenthal ("Reuenthal Fortress Museum") was opened. The construction of the military museum in Full on a former industrial site began in 1998. The sponsor of the Swiss Military Museum in Full is the Verein Militär- und Festungsmuseum Full-Reuenthal ("Full-Reuenthal Military and Fortress Museum") or VMFM. Until 2011 the association offices were located in the old Reuenthal Fortress, which it has also operated as a museum since 1989. A new museum hall was opened in April 2010.

== Collection ==
The museum displays military hardware and uniforms of Swiss and foreign armed forces, mainly from World War II and the Cold War. The museum displays mainly tanks, artillery, anti-aircraft and anti-tank guns of the Swiss Army and other armies from the 20th century in several former factory halls.

A special feature is the complete factory collection of the former arms manufacturer Oerlikon-Bührle on the upper floor of the museum. This mainly comprises anti-aircraft and aircraft weapons. The museum also owns a German V1 flying bomb, a Reichenberg device, and engines and defence stands from British and American bombers that crashed or made emergency landings in Switzerland.

== List with some of the exhibits ==
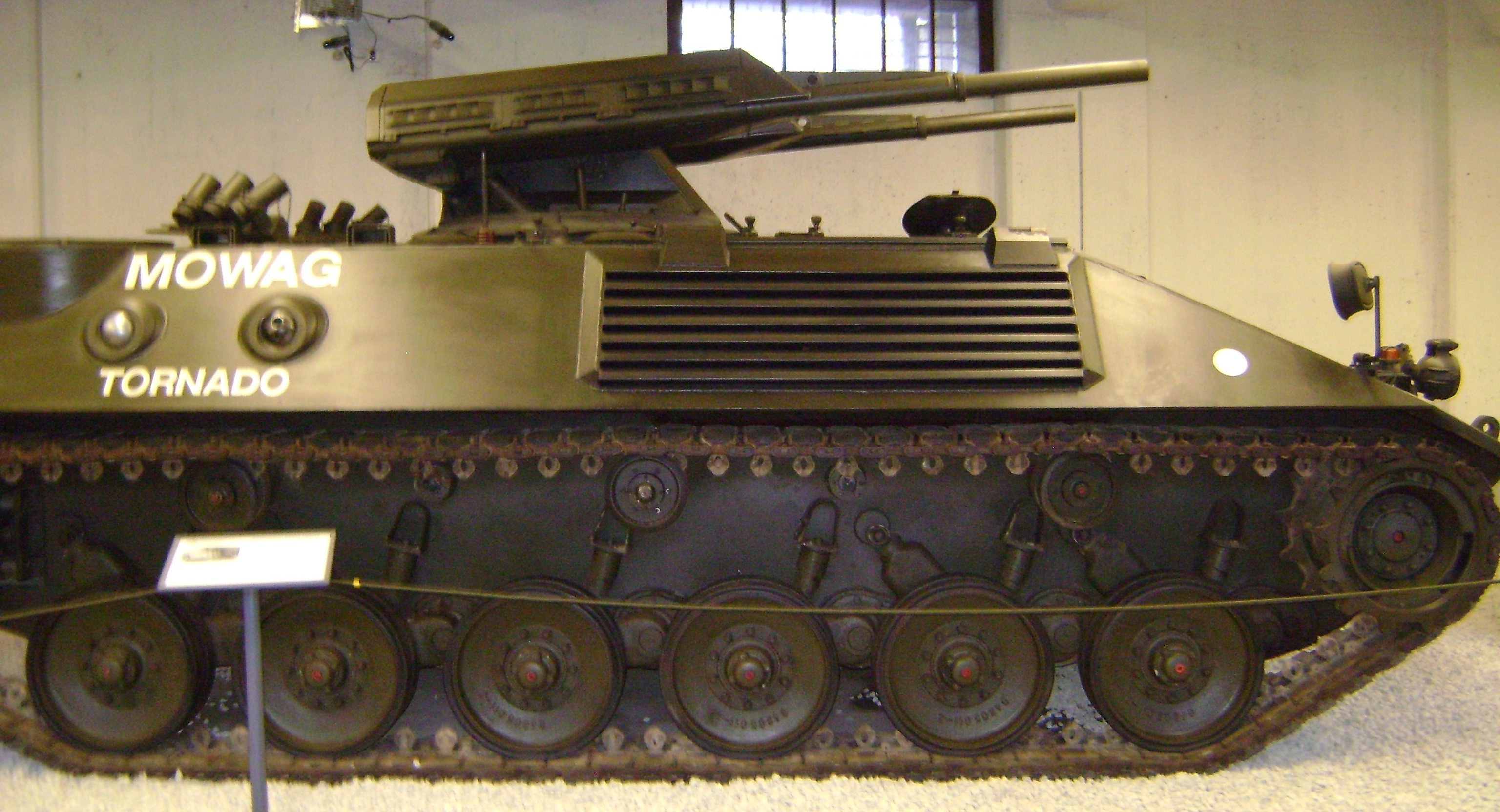
MOWAG Tornado 2

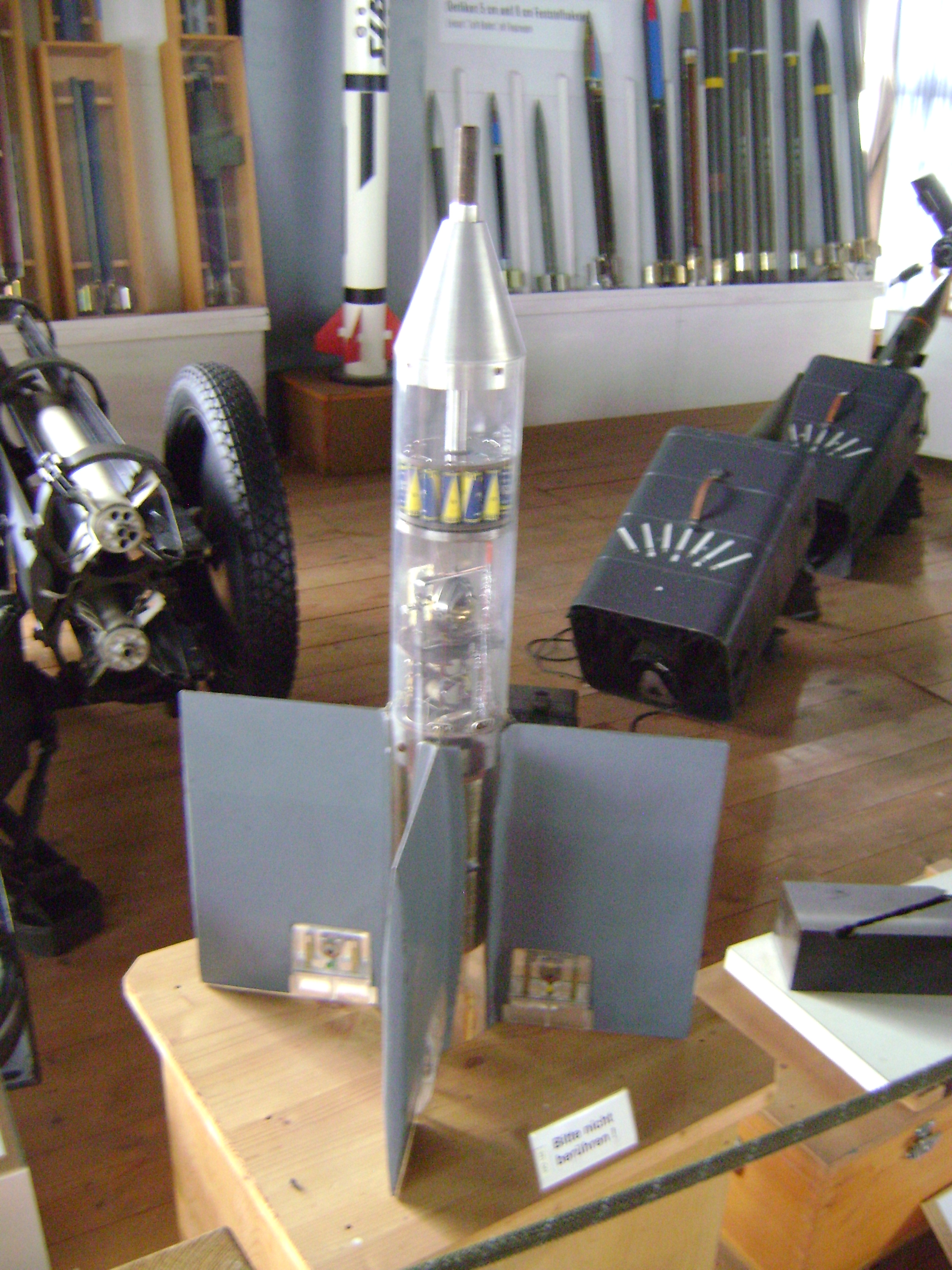
Oerlikon Mosquito ATM

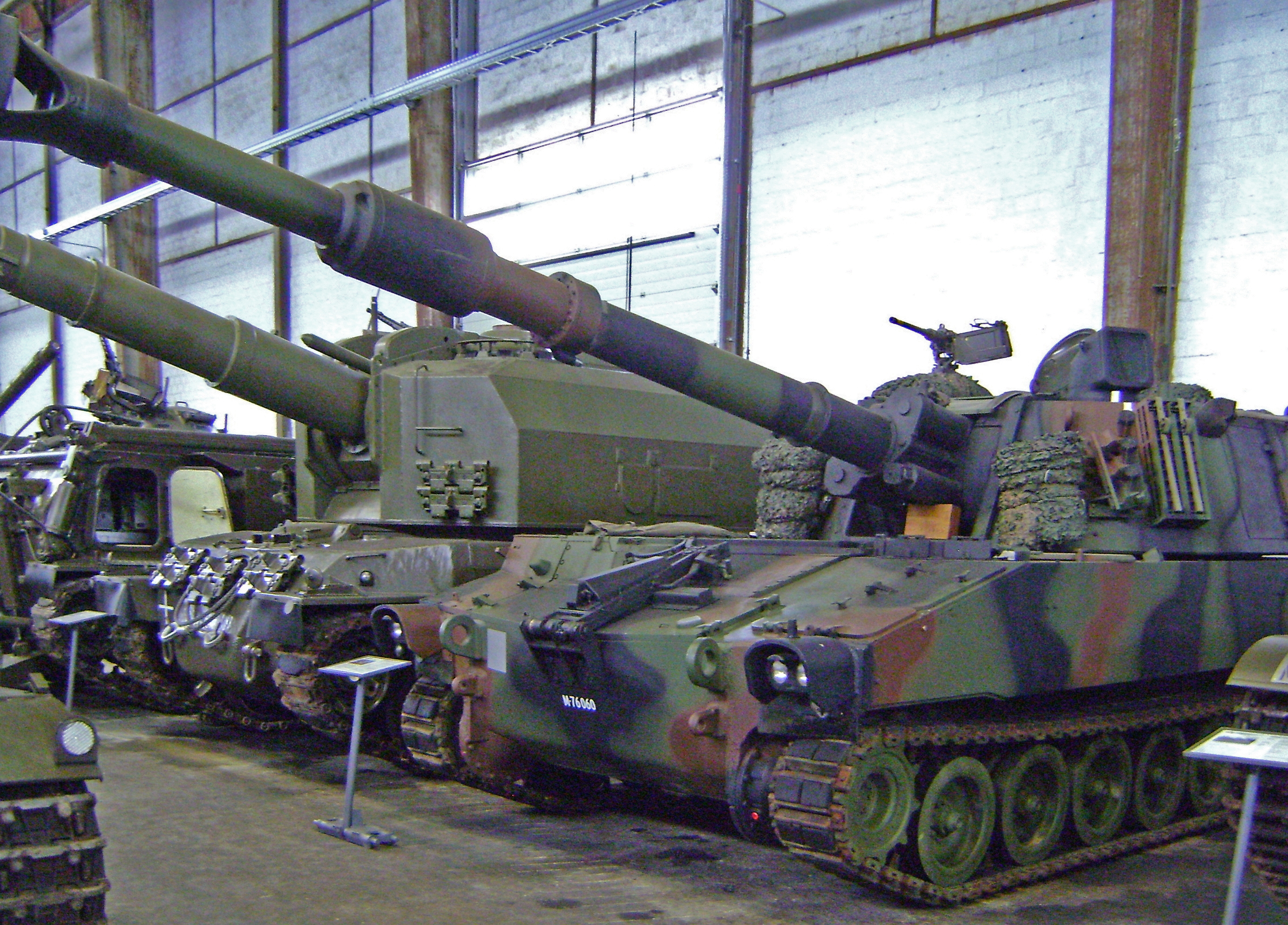
Panzerkanone 68, M109

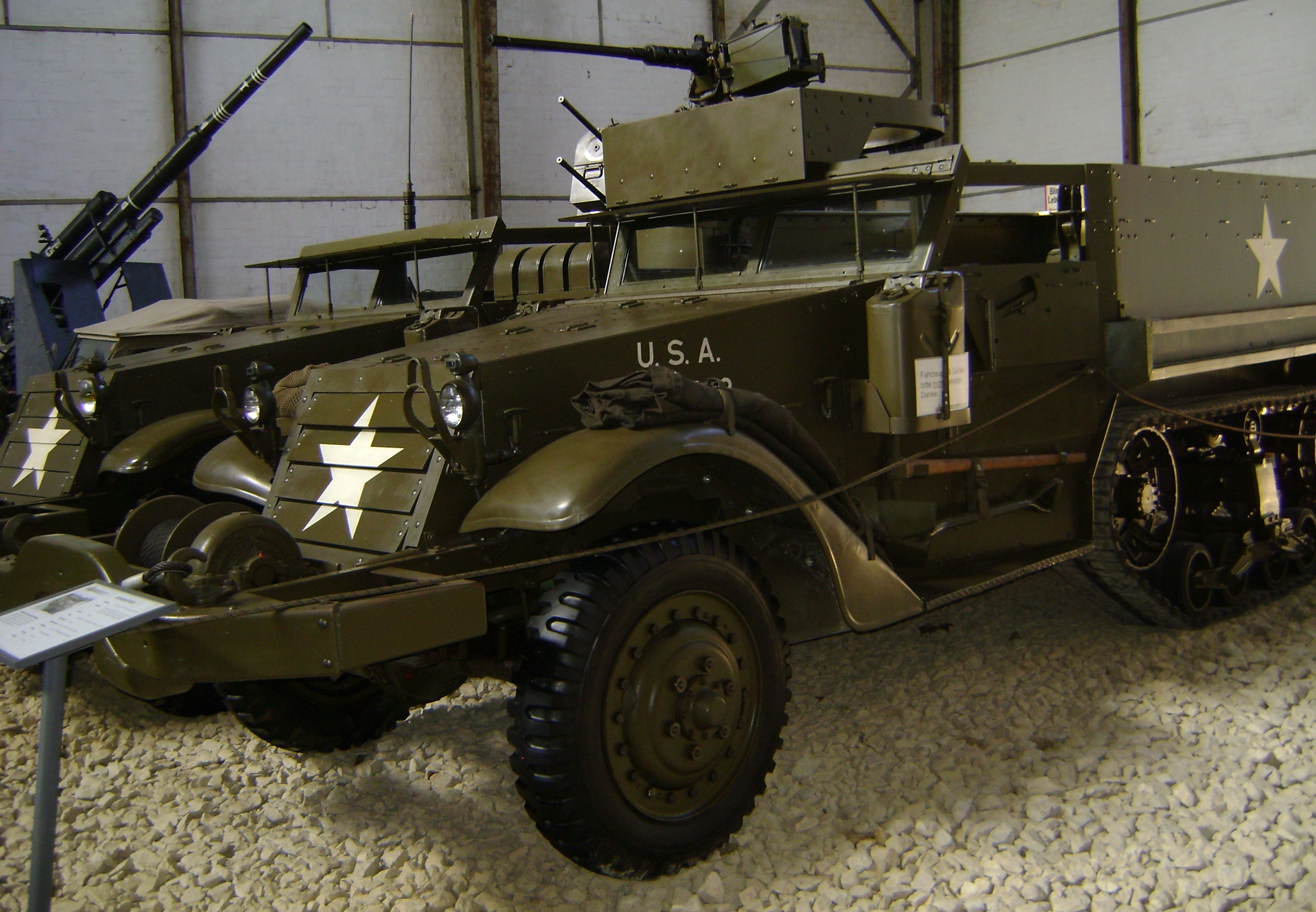
US Army Halftrack

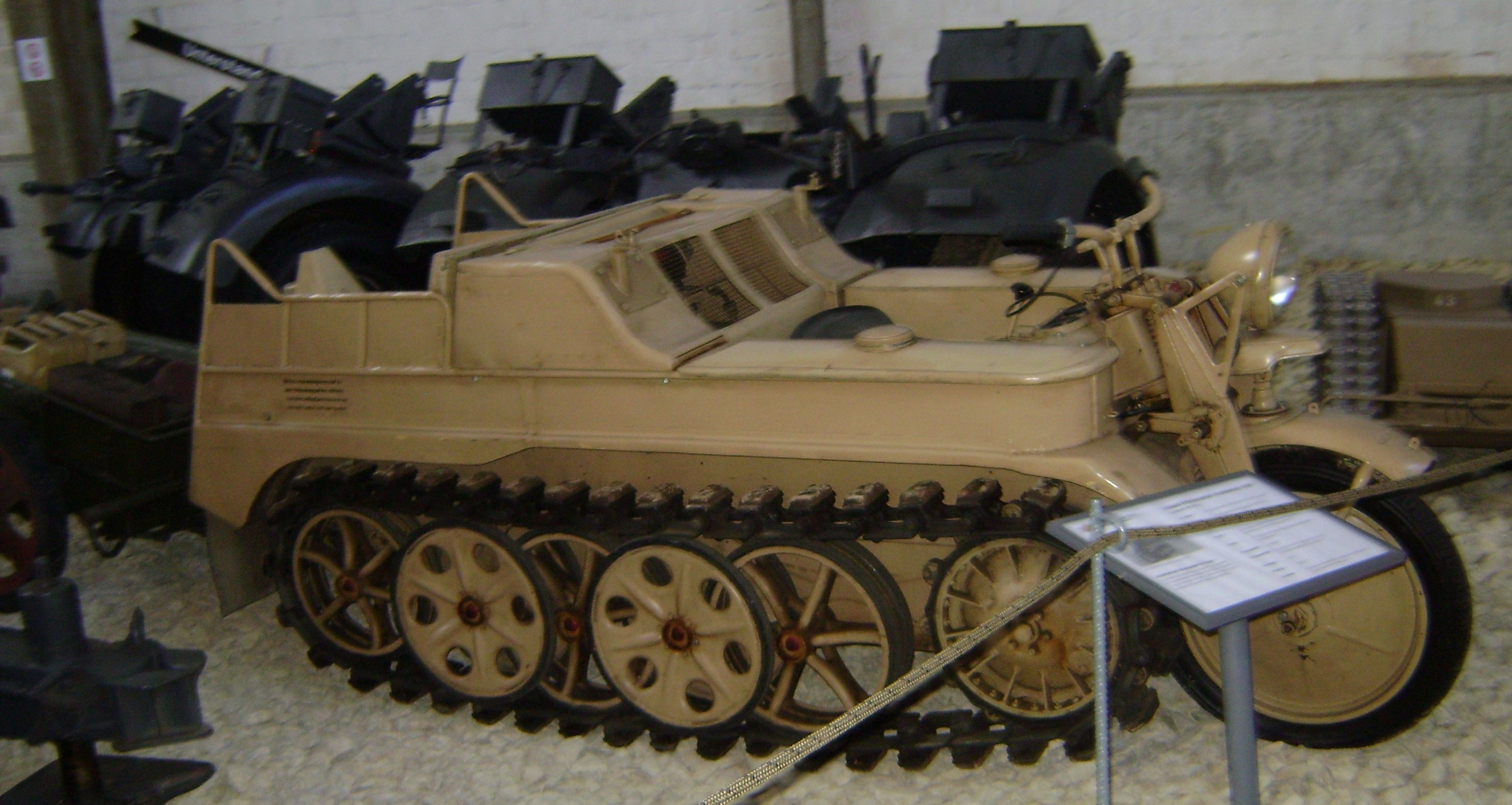
Kettenkrad

=== Swiss Army ===
- Alouette III
- De Havilland Vampire DH.100
- AMX-13
- Panzer 61
- Panzer 68
- Zielfahrzeug 68
- Entpannungspanzer 65
- Brückenpanzer 68
- Tank gun 68
- Saurer D 330 N
- Saurer 2DM
- Saurer 2 CM
- Saurer M6
- Saurer MH4
- Berna 2VM
- M548
- M113
- M109 howitzer
- ČKD-Praga LT-H / Panzerwagen 39
- Centurion tank
- Rotinoff Super Atlantic
- Bucher FS 10 Flugzeugschlepper 78

=== Non Swiss Army Vehicles ===
- FBW 80-N
- Trabant
- Goliath tracked mine
- T-34
- T-55
- T-72
- V-1 flying bomb
- Fieseler Fi 103R Reichenberg
- Tiger II (under reconstruction)
- Panhard EBR
- P-18 radar
- Ural-4320
- 2S1 Gvozdika
- Schützenpanzer Lang HS.30
- MDK-2M
- GAZ-69
- Leopard 1
- PSzH
- Sturmgeschütz III

=== Air Defense ===
- SNORA and SURA-D rockets
- Bristol Bloodhound
- Super Fledermaus
- Oerlikon 35 mm twin cannon
- Oerlikon 20 mm cannon
- Mosquito (missile)
- RSD 58

=== Former Mowag Factory Museum ===
- Mowag 4x4 armored reconnaissance vehicle (armored dummy)
- Mowag MR 8
- Mowag Roland
- Mowag Puma
- Mowag Shark
- Mowag Spy
- Mowag Tornado infantry fighting vehicle
- Mowag Trojan infantry fighting vehicle
- Mowag Pirat
- Mowag 3M1 Pirat
- Jagdpanzer MOWAG Cheetah
- Mowag Piranha
- Mowag Eagle
- MOWAG-AEG
- Mowag T1 4x4

== See also ==
- List of museums in Switzerland
