= FBW 80-N =

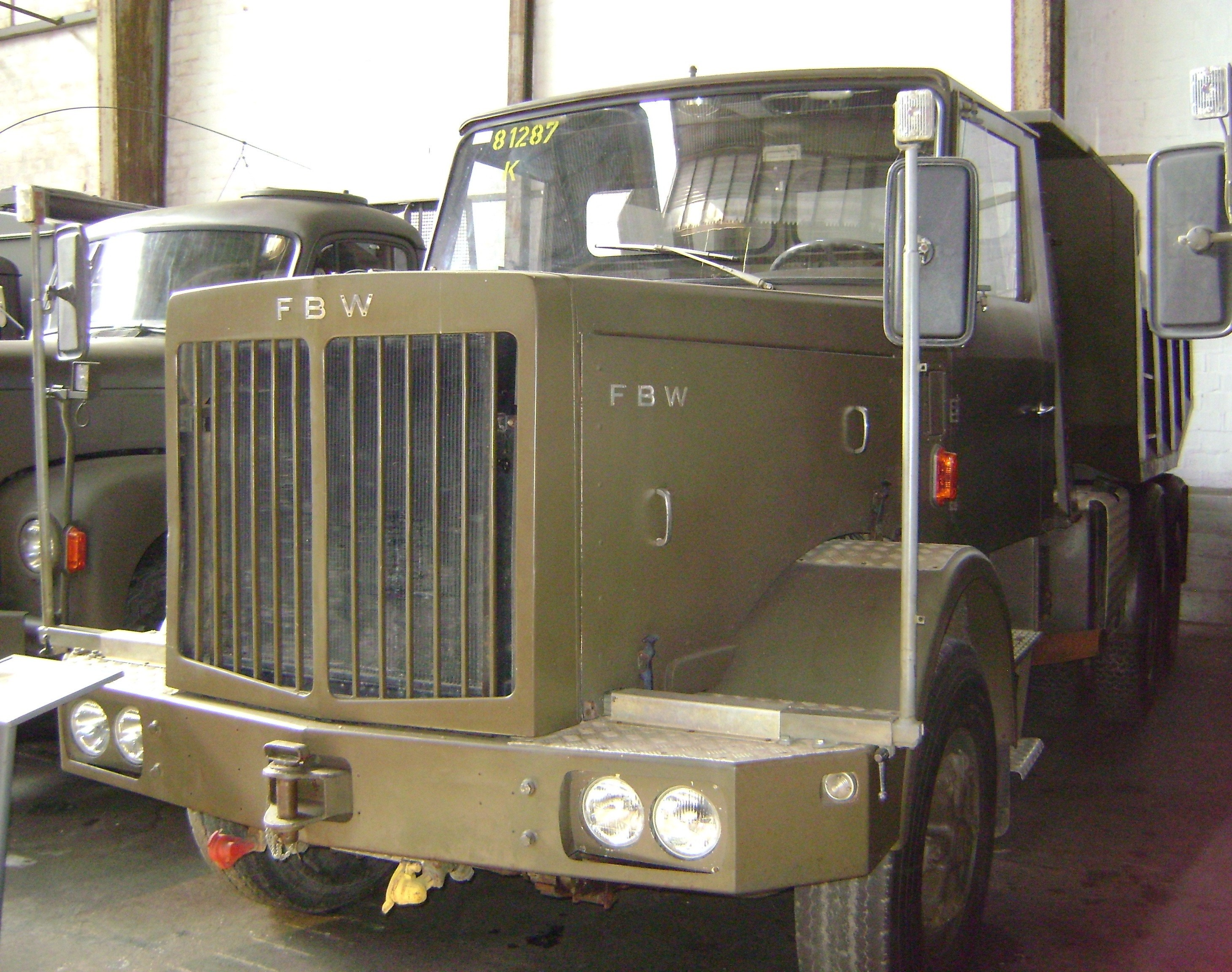
- 80-N at Military Museum Full
- Type: Military dump truck
- Place of origin: Switzerland

Service history
- In service: 1976 - 1990
- Used by: Switzerland

Production history
- Manufacturer: Franz Brozincevic Wetzikon
- Produced: 1976
- No. built: 2
- Variants: dumptruck

Specifications
- Mass: Empty: 13,700 kg (30,200 lb); Max: 25,000 kg (55,000 lb)
- Crew: 1 driver + 2 passengers
- Engine: FBW E6A 6 cylinder series, diesel Displacement 11,946 cc 235 kW
- Suspension: 4x6
- Maximum speed: 81 km/h (50 mph)

The FBW 80-N is a vehicle of the Swiss vehicle manufacturer Franz Brozincevic & Cie. It was one of the last trucks built by Franz Brozincevic Wetzikon.

In 1976, the truck was made and from 1976 to 1990 the Swiss Army used it with the M number M+81287. Another one was used until the year 2000 by the civilian Nüssli AG. It never entered mass production, because the Army bought 72 of the dump trucks Saurer D 330 N. The only vehicle is today in the Military Museum Full. The FBW Type 80 was one of the last designed trucks from FBW.
