= ADWAT mine =

Anti-tank mine

ADWAT is a French anti-tank blast mine used with the Matenin mine laying system. The mine has the same casing as the MI AC PR series of mines. The mine has a mechanical and electronic fuze. The mine incorporates a 30-minute arming delay, after which either the electronic or mechanical fuze can trigger the mine. The electronic fuze can be programmed using an external programmer with a three-pin connection to self-neutralize, self-destruct and act as an anti-handling device, with an active period of between one and 365 days.

The mine is reported to be resistant to blast and mine countermeasures.

== Specifications ==
- Length: 282 mm
- Width: 188 mm
- Height: 104 mm
- Weight: 5.7 kg
- Explosive content: 3.9 kg of TNT
