= Mosquito (missile) =

Swiss–Italian anti-tank missile

Oerlikon-Contraves Mosquito
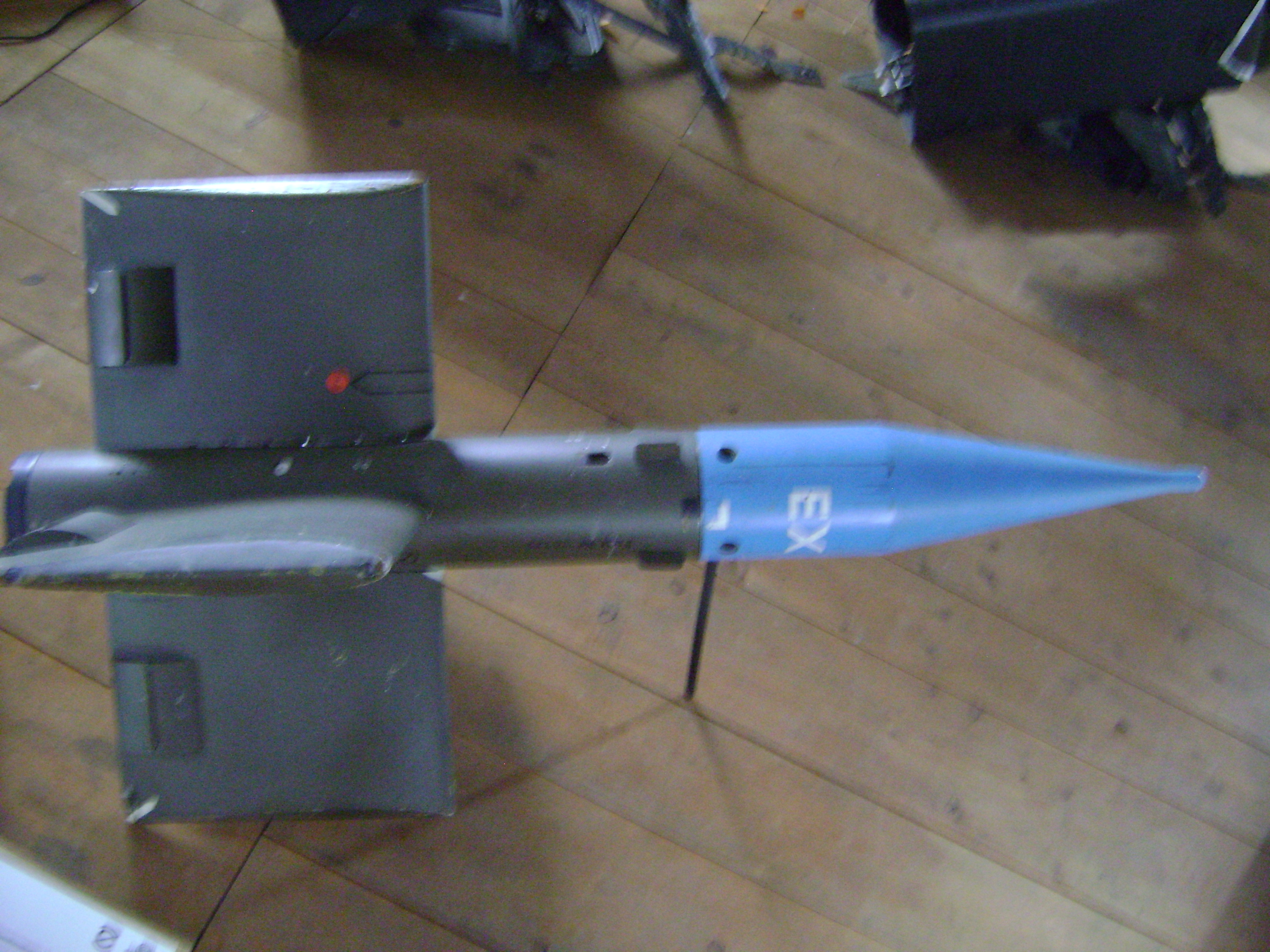
- Mosquito at Armee Museum Full
- Type: Anti-tank missile
- Place of origin: Switzerland; West Germany

Service history
- In service: 1964 – ?
- Used by: Italy

Production history
- Designer: Oerlikon-Contraves
- Designed: 1959-1964
- Unit cost: $900 (flyaway unit in both its training and tactical versions, as of June 1959)
- Produced: 1964

Specifications
- Mass: 14.1 kg
- Length: 1110 mm
- Width: 600 mm (wingspan)
- Effective firing range: 1500–1800 m
- Warhead weight: 4 kg
- Maximum speed: 90 m/s (320 km/h)
- Guidance system: MCLOS

The Mosquito was an Italian wire-guided anti-tank missile developed by the Swiss firm Contraves AG in close cooperation with the German firm of Bölkow, and produced by its Italian subsidiary Contraves Italiana SpA. It entered service with the Italian Army in 1961 and Indonesian armed forces. It was broadly similar to anti-tank missiles of the era, having a fibreglass body with four large wings, cruciform in cross-section and a relatively short body.

The missile is transported in a cuboid container that also acts as a launcher. The launcher is attached to a control box that is equipped with a binocular sight and control joystick. When the missile is launched the operator steers the missile using the joystick. He first "gathers" the missile to his line of sight to the target.

It is steered in flight by vibrating spoilers in the wings, and spins for additional stabilization, with a pyrotechnically spun gyroscope providing stabilization. Some Mosquito missiles are on display at the Schweizerisches Militärmuseum Full.

== Operators ==
Italy
Indonesia
Malaysia

== Specifications ==
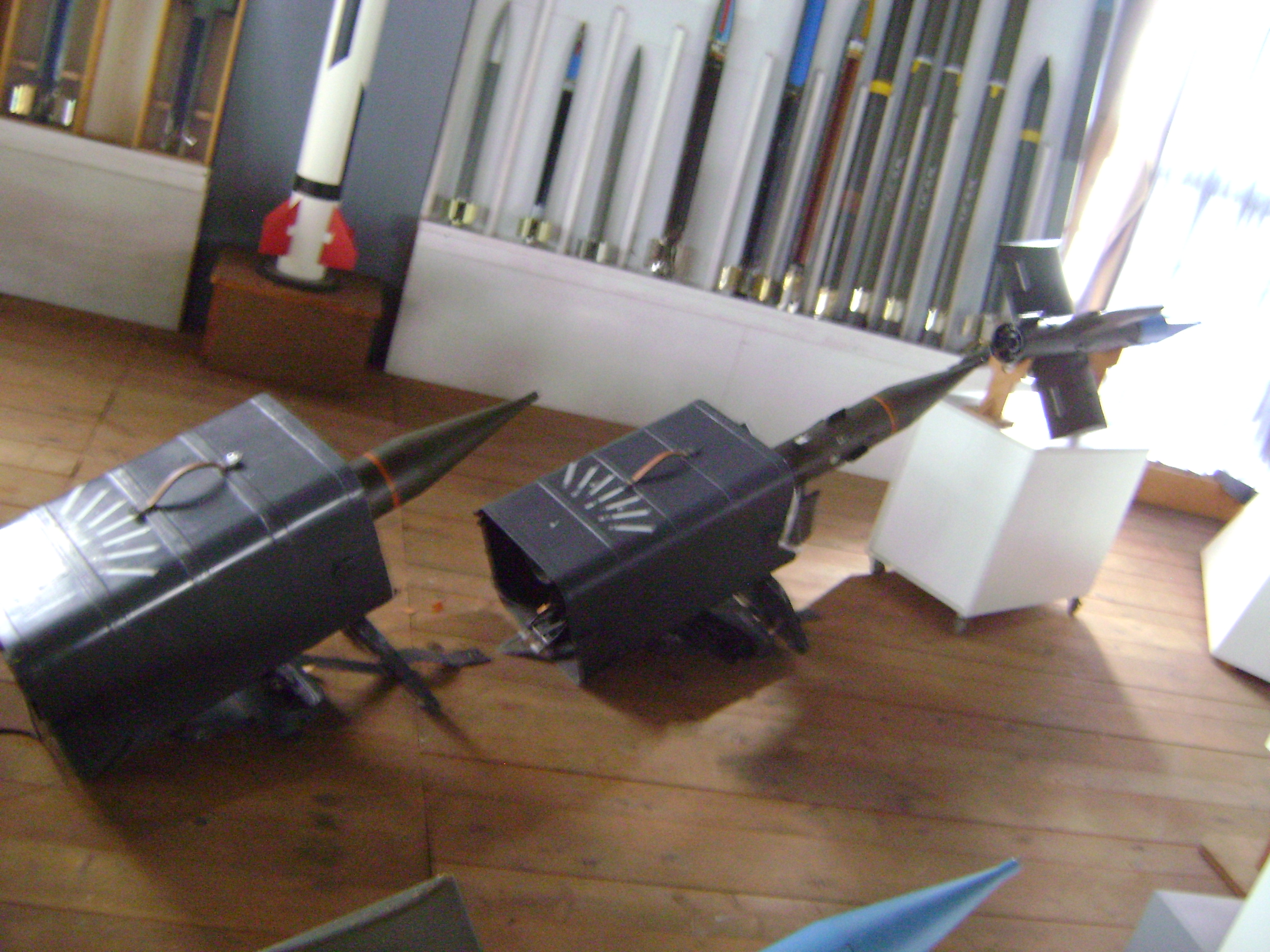
Mosquito with startunit

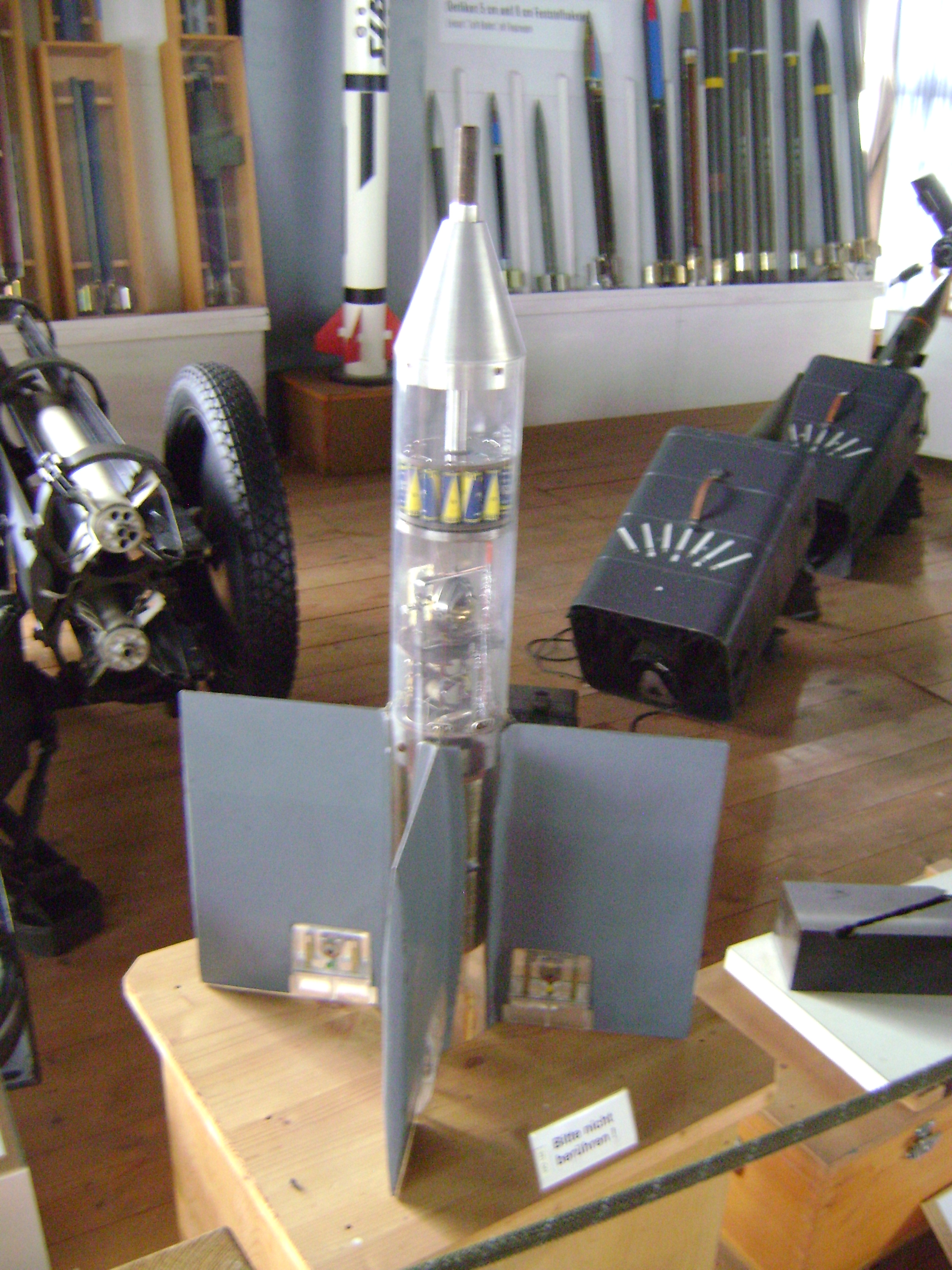
- Length: 1.11 m
- Diameter: 0.12 m
- Wingspan: 0.6 m
- Weight: 14.1 kg
- Range 350 m to 2400 m
- Peak speed: 90 m/s
- Warhead: Either 4 kg hollow charge (660 mm versus RHA) or fragmentation
- Propulsion: Two-stage solid rocket motor.
