= VS-SATM1 mine =

The VS-SATM1 is an Italian scatterable anti-tank landmine that was produced by Valsella Meccanotecnica SpA. The mine can be scattered by a GRILLO-128 man-portable single-tube launcher system or a VS-MDH helicopter based system. The mine has six pop-out fins which slow its descent and improve the dispersion characteristics.

The mine uses an electronic fuze with a ten-minute arming delay and a programmable life of between one hour and one year, which is set in one-hour increments. After the programmable life expires, the mine either self-destructs or self-neutralizes. The fuze is an electronic full-width device that probably uses magnetic and seismic sensors. The mine can also function underwater. The fuze contains an integral anti-handling device to hinder deminers.

The mine's warhead is a shaped charge, optimized to produce maximum spalling behind armour — it can blast a 45-millimeter-diameter hole through a 100-millimeter-thick armour plate.

== Specifications ==
- Diameter: 128 mm
- Height: 105 mm
- Weight: 2.5 kg
- Explosive content: 0.8 kg
