= Mowag Tornado infantry fighting vehicle =

MOWAG IFV Tornado
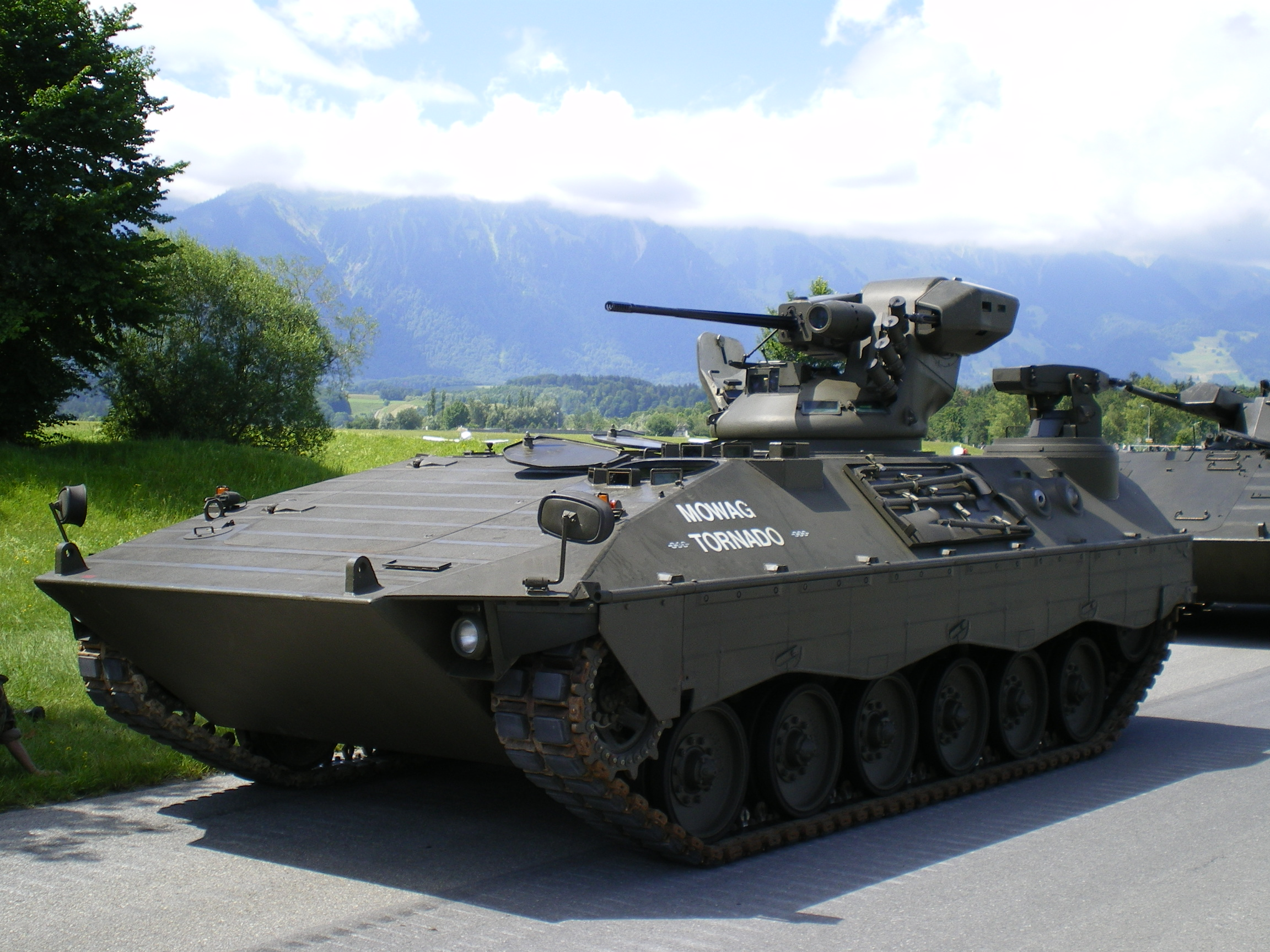
- MOWAG Tornado at the Schweizerisches Militärmuseum Full
- Type: IFV APC
- Place of origin: Switzerland

Service history
- Used by: no one

Production history
- Manufacturer: MOWAG motor car factory Kreuzlingen
- Produced: 1980
- No. built: >1

Specifications
- Crew: 11: driver, commander, gunner + 8 Panzergrenadiere
- Main armament: turret OERLIKON GBD COA with 1x25mm KBA B02 and 1x coaxial 7.62 mm MG3
- Secondary armament: 4x 76mm rocket launcher and 9mm submachine guns in MOWAG ball screens, optional 2 movable machine guns in MOWAG apex guns.
- Engine: V8 Detroit Diesel V8-71A-TLK Displacement 9300 cm ³ 423 kW
- Transmission: Transmission converter, switching, automatic gearbox with four forward gears, 4 reverse
- Maximum speed: 70 km/h (43 mph)

The MOWAG Tornado is an armoured Infantry fighting vehicle of the company Mowag from Switzerland.

The engine is located in the bow, the driver is on the right side and directly behind him the commander, the armored infantry troops leave the vehicle through a rear door, there is a certain resemblance to the Soviet BMP-1. Different versions of the Tornado with various weapons were tested. The last version was built in 1980. There was never a serial production. The Tornado has an AC air safety system fitted and an automatic fire detection and extinguishing system fitted in the engine compartment. Also the use of SNORA and SURA-D rockets as main weapons was possible. A MOWAG Tornado is part of the Schweizerisches Militärmuseum Full.
