= Simmel Difesa =

Italian munitions company

Simmel Difesa logo

Simmel Difesa is an Italian firm located in Colleferro that manufacturers land and naval munitions. Founded in 1948, Simmel specialized in the production of large-caliber munitions.In 1988, Simmel was acquired by the Fiat Group.

During this period, Simmel itself acquired the assets of Bombrini-Parodi-Delfino, a longtime manufacturer of gunpowder and munitions in Italy. Simmel was acquired by and became an operating company of the Chemring Group in 2007, which purchased Simmel at the cost of $102.5 million. In 2014, Chemring Group sold Simmel Difesa to Nexter Systems.

In October 2007, an explosion in the Colleferro munitions works killed one worker and wounded 13.

Today, Simmel has over 200 employees and an annual turnover of over 80 million Euros. Simmel claims it is capable of manufacturing 300,000 rounds of ammunition annually. Current products include munitions ranging in caliber from 20-mm to 203-mm. Simmel's business is mostly oriented towards export with only 30% of its annual turnover resulting from business in Italy.

Simmel's production of cluster munitions has made the company a protest object of peace activists. Simmel claims it no longer manufactures cluster munitions.
