= VS-1.6 mine =

Italian anti-tank mine

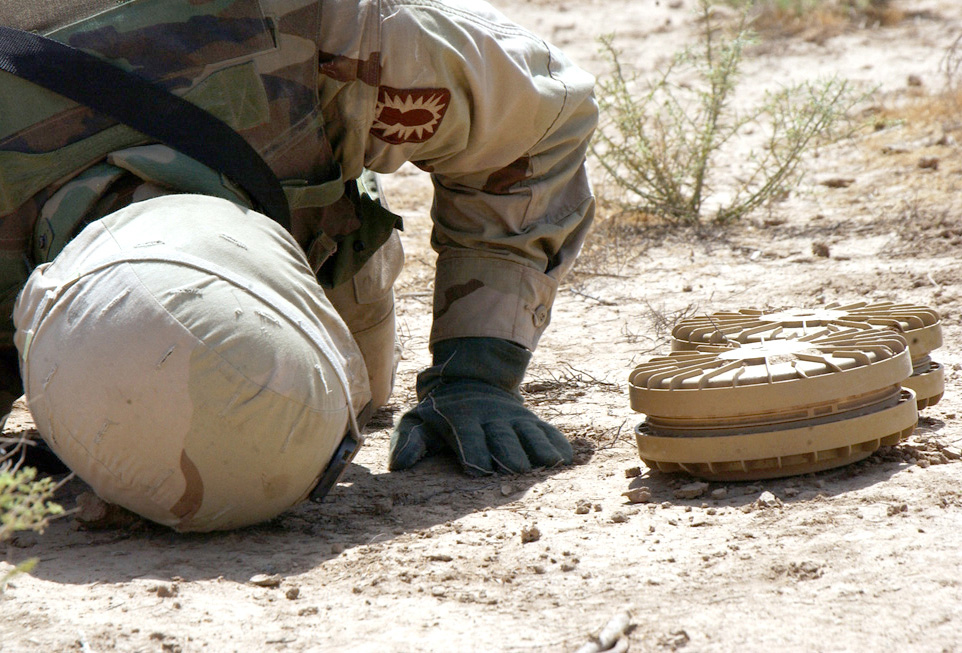
A soldier examines two upside-down VS-1.6 mines in Iraq.

The VS-1.6 is an Italian circular plastic-cased scatterable anti-tank blast mine. It has very few metal components and is resistant to overpressure and shock. The mine can also be deployed conventionally and from helicopters. It was produced by Valsella Meccanotecnica, but production has ceased.

== Description ==
The mine is normally olive green or sand-coloured and is circular with two circular bands around the circumference, which act to cushion shock when the mine is deployed from the air. The fuze is air pressure driven with pressure on the top plate of the mine forcing air into a diaphragm which exerts pressure on the striker. Shocks from overpressure are too short to inflate the diaphragm; additionally the striker must first rotate a locking collar before it can activate the mine, this requires gradual pressure giving even greater resistance to shock. The sealed nature of the mine means that it can be deployed in up to 1 meter of water.

The main charge of the mine is relatively small for an anti-tank mine, so it would tend to disable rather than destroy vehicles. An electronically fuzed version of the mine, the VS-1.6EL with an integral electronic anti-handling device and programmable self-destruct fuze was also produced.

The mine is found in Iraq, Kuwait, Lebanon, Burma and the Western Sahara.

== Specifications ==
- Weight: 3 kg
- Explosive content: 1.85 kg of Composition B
- Diameter: 222 mm
- Height: 92 mm
- Operating pressure: 180 to 220 kg

== See also ==
- Anti-tank mine
