= Snia (company) =

SNIA S.p.A.
- Industry: Chemicals and defense products
- Founded: 1917
- Founder: Richard Gualino
- Defunct: 2010
- Fate: Bankrupt
- Headquarters: Milan, Italy

Snia, stylized as SNIA, (later SNIA Viscosa and finally SNIA BDG Srl) was an Italian firm located in Milan that manufactured defence products, textiles, chemicals, perfumes, and corrugated paper among other products.

== History ==
The Società di Navigazione Italo-Americana (SNIA) was founded as a shipping company in 1917 in Turin by the financier Riccardo Gualino of Turin. Giovanni Agnelli of Fiat was vice-president of SNIA from 1917 to 1926. Gualino and Agnelli became involved in the profitable transport of US aid to Europe in 1917. In the early 1920s SNIA began to manufacture artificial textile fibers. Artificial cellulose fibers had been produced before the war, but SNIA was the first to mass-produce rayon. The company was given the new name of SNIA Viscosa (Società nazionale industria e applicazioni viscosa, National Rayon Manufacturing and Application Company).

Gualino made huge investments in SNIA Viscosa. By the mid-1920s SNIA Viscosa was the largest company in Italy in terms of capital. By 1926 SNIA Viscosa had become the second-largest rayon producer in the world. The United States produced more rayon in total, but Italy was the world's largest rayon exporter. In 1927–28 Courtaulds and Vereinigte Glanzstoff-Fabriken (VGF) gained control of SNIA Viscosa. A German director of VGF, Karl Scherer, replaced Gualino as head of the firm and cut output drastically. The foreign intervention was seen as humiliating by the fascists. In 1930 Gualino was forced to sell his share in SNIA Viscosa and many other investments to try to reduce his debt. By this time the company had lost its leadership position, but in 1931 it was the first to manufacture a short-fiber flock, and the first to produce cellulose from reeds to eliminate dependence on imported materials.

Only barely surviving the crash of 1929, SNIA recovered under the leadership of Franco Marinotti and enjoyed prosperity until World War II, when the manufacturing plants were heavily bombed by the Allies. Post-1945, Marinotti again restored the firm to being a profitable enterprise. After acquiring Bombrini-Parodi-Delfino in 1968, SNIA also produced weapons systems such as the SNORA and SURA-D rockets and Medusa rocket system. SNIA later also manufactured medical products following its merger with Sorin Group in the 1980s.

In November 2009, SNIA's debt reached almost 25 million euros. As of December 2009, SNIA was to present its debt-restructuring plan to the Milan court system for approval. The attempt to save the firm failed in April 2010 and the firm was declared insolvent by the Court of Milan. In December 2010, the Italian Stock Exchange ordered the withdrawal of SNIA ordinary shares and bonds from the market.

== See also ==
- Snia Milano

== Sources ==
- Chiapparino, Francesco (2003). "GUALINO, Riccardo". Dizionario Biografico degli Italiani (in Italian). Vol. 60. Trecanni.
- Donzé, Pierre-Yves; Nishimura, Shigehiro (2013-11-12). Organizing Global Technology Flows: Institutions, Actors, and Processes. Routledge. ISBN 978-1-135-01357-8.
- Eichengreen, Barry (2014-12-20). Hall of Mirrors: The Great Depression, the Great Recession, and the Uses-and Misuses-of History. Oxford University Press. ISBN 978-0-19-939200-1.
- "Riccardo Gualino". Storia e Cultura dell'Industria. Archived from the original on 2021-07-31.
- Zamagni, Vera (1993-10-28). The Economic History of Italy 1860-1990. Clarendon Press. ISBN 978-0-19-159022-1.
