= Saurer D 330 N =

Saurer D 330 N, 4x6
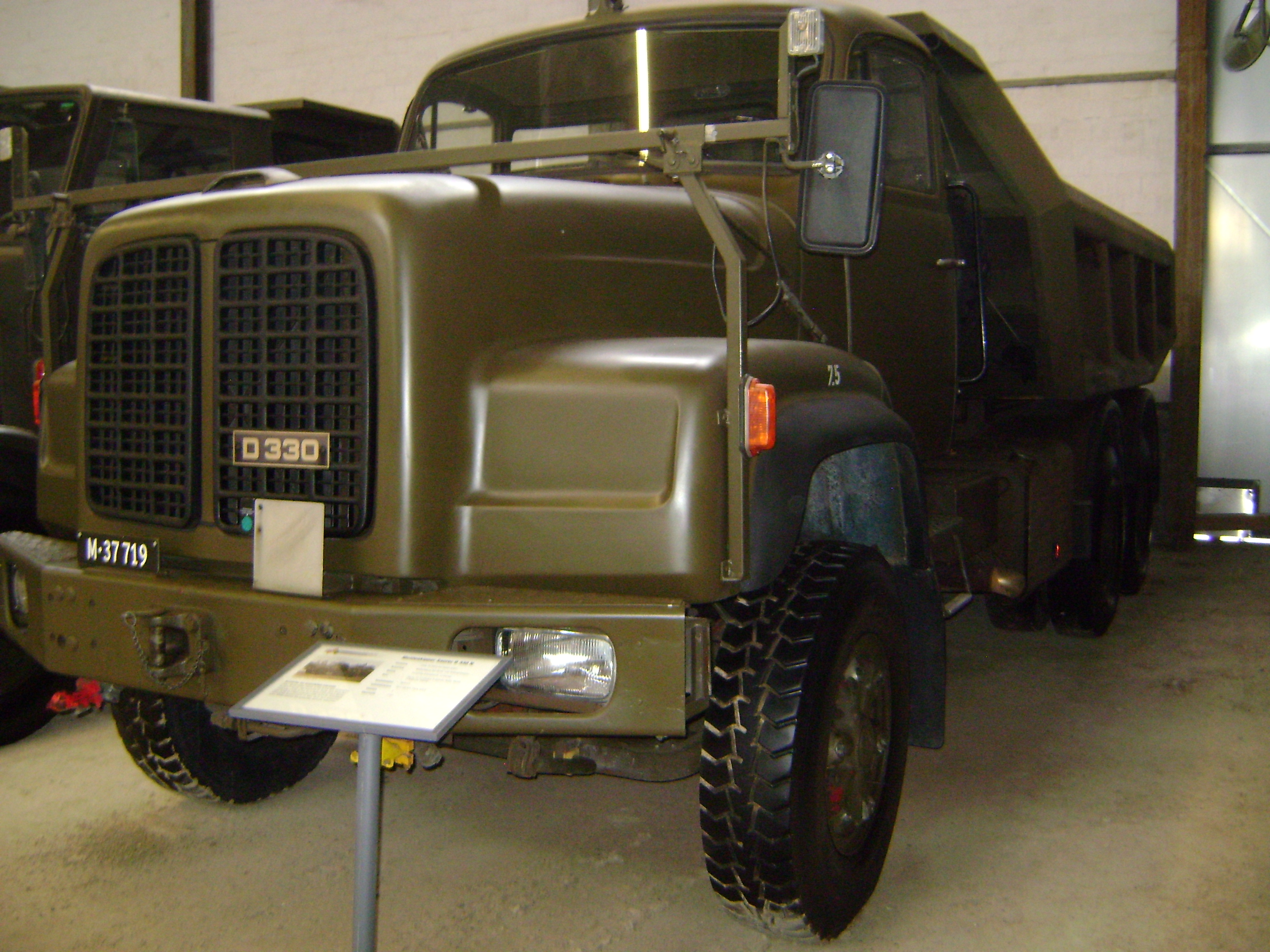
- Swiss Army Saurer D 330 N
- Place of origin: Switzerland

Service history
- In service: 1979 - today
- Used by: Switzerland

Production history
- Designer: Adolph Saurer AG
- Designed: 1979
- Manufacturer: Saurer
- Produced: 1979 -?
- No. built: 72
- Variants: Dumptruck

Specifications
- Mass: 25000Kg (Empty 13500 kg)
- Length: 8,3m
- Width: 2,45m
- Height: 2,9m
- Crew: 1+ 2Pax in cabin
- Engine: Saurer D2 KT (Turbo) 6 cylinder in line Diesel 11946ccm 330hp
- Payload capacity: 7 cubic M
- Suspension: 4x6 wheeled
- Fuel capacity: 300 l
- Operational range: 875km
- Maximum speed: 80 km/h

The Saurer D 330 N is a truck model, which established by the Adolph Saurer AG at Arbon in 1979. The Saurer D330N prevailed over the FBW 80N in the evaluation. The Swiss Army used these trucks in engineer/sapper and rescue units. One is on display at the Schweizerisches Militärmuseum Full, and another one at the Zuger Depot Technikgeschichte.
