= Mowag MR 8 =

German border forces and police armored personnel carrier

MOWAG MR 8-01 WOTAN
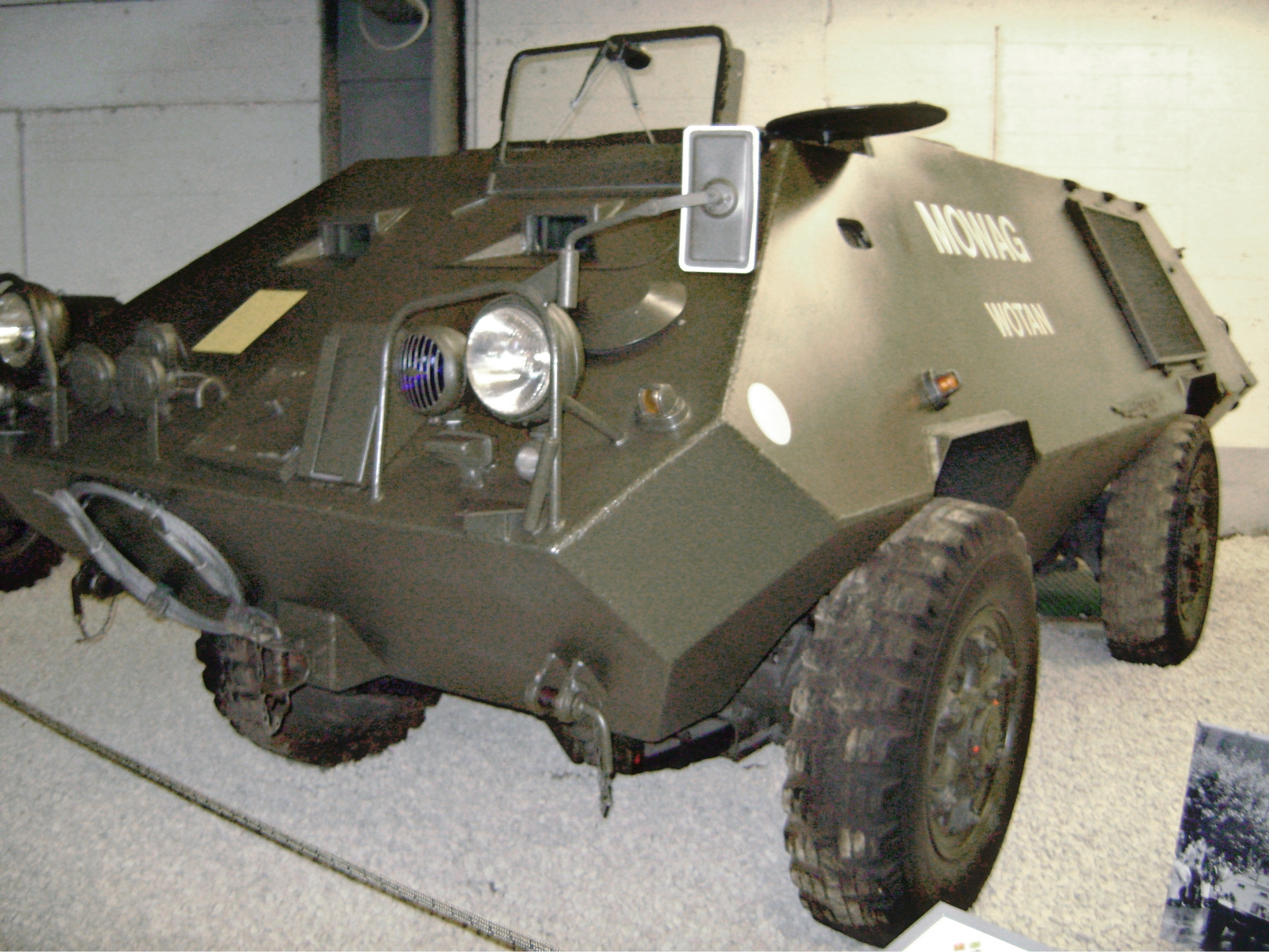
- MOWAG WOTAN prototype at the Swiss Military Museum
- Place of origin: Switzerland

Service history
- Used by: Germany

Production history
- Designer: MOWAG Motorwagenfabrik AG Kreuzlingen
- Manufacturer: Büssing (Germany); Henschel (Germany)
- Produced: 1963
- No. built: 600–700
- Variants: SW1, SW2

Specifications
- Mass: 8,200 kg (18,100 lb)
- Crew: SW1: 7 (driver, commander, and five passengers in the rear); SW2: 4 (driver, commander, and two passengers in the rear)
- Main armament: SW2a 20mm autocannon SW2b MG 3 machine gun
- Engine: 6-cylinder diesel engine Büssing / Henschel / Daimler Benz; 118 kW / 161 PS
- Transmission: ZF transmission, 5 forward gears, 1 reverse
- Suspension: 4x4 wheeled
- Operational range: 300 km (190 mi)
- Maximum speed: 85 km/h (53 mph) on road 42 km/h (26 mph) off-road 12 km/h (7 mph) through water

The MOWAG MR 8 (WOTAN) is a border force and police armoured personnel carrier. It was developed by Mowag in Switzerland and built under licence in West Germany.

== History ==
The WOTAN was introduced in 1963 in West Germany (Federal Republic of Germany) as a Special Vehicle (Sonderwagen) in versions SW1 and SW2 for the Federal Border Guard (Bundesgrenzschutz) and the Readiness (Riot) Police (Bereitschaftspolizei) of the German states.

The special vehicle SW1 had no armament of its own and featured an unusual split-open observation turret-hatch (cupola), whereas the special vehicle SW2 came in two versions featuring a one-man 360° rotating turret: SW2a with a Hispano-Suiza HS.820 autocannon, later upgraded to a Rheinmetall Mk 20 Rh-202 300-round autocannon (carrying 200 HE and 100 AP rounds), and SW2b with a 500-round dismountable MG 3 machine gun. Additionally, the SW2 had three smoke grenade launchers on each side of the turret. Both the SW1 and SW2 versions featured roof-mounted Bosch RKLE 90 or Hella KLJ 60 blue police light beacons.

The Federal Border Guard referred to the SW1 and SW2, also as Kfz 91 and Kfz 92, respectively Kfz stands for Kraftfahrzeug, meaning motor vehicle. MOWAG delivered the first 20 special vehicles, and around 600–700 were built under license by Büssing and Henschel in West Germany, with the armoured chassis supplied by Blohm+Voss.

Other variants were built, such as a mortar launching vehicle, but these found no buyers. A WOTAN prototype, which was tested by the Federal Border Guard, is now in the Swiss Military Museum. An amphibious version was marketed as the Mowag Grenadier.

The MOWAG MR 8 was replaced from 1983 by the Thyssen-Henschel TM-170 armoured personnel carrier.

== Design ==
The four-wheel drive (4×4) vehicle had a small turning radius and was equipped with 2-axle steering. The arrangement of the engine installed in the rear left allowed the crew to park the vehicle and exit from the side and rear.

== Variants ==
- MR 8 "SW1": also known as Kfz91. Armoured personnel carrier with a small observation turret-hatch (cupola) and no integral weapon. The turret hatch is split down the centre, allowing it to open vertically, in each half there are three vision blocks. Crew: 7; commander (right-hand side), driver (left-hand side), and five equipped infantry personnel in the rear compartment.
- MR 8 "SW2a": also known as Kfz92. Armoured personnel carrier with a one-man 360° rotating turret, initially equipped with a Hispano-Suiza HS.820 autocannon, later upgraded to a Rheinmetall Mk 20 Rh-202 300-round autocannon, and three smoke grenade launchers on each side of the turret. Crew: 4; commander (right-hand side), driver (left-hand side), and two equipped infantry personnel in the rear compartment.
- MR 8 "SW2b": also known as Kfz92. Armoured personnel carrier equipped with a 500-round dismountable MG 3 machine gun and three smoke grenade launchers on each side of the turret. Crew: 4; commander (right-hand side), driver (left-hand side), and two equipped infantry personnel in the rear compartment.
  - MR 8-09: 20 mm Rheinmetall Mk 20 Rh-202 autocannon upgrade.
  - MR 8-20: unguided rocket and ATGM variant, with provision for twin 8 cm unguided missile launchers.
  - MR 8-23: heavy fire support and tank hunter vehicle with 90 mm medium-pressure gun and 7.62 mm coaxial machine gun and two-man turret.
  - MR 9-32: 120 mm mortar carrier.

== Gallery ==
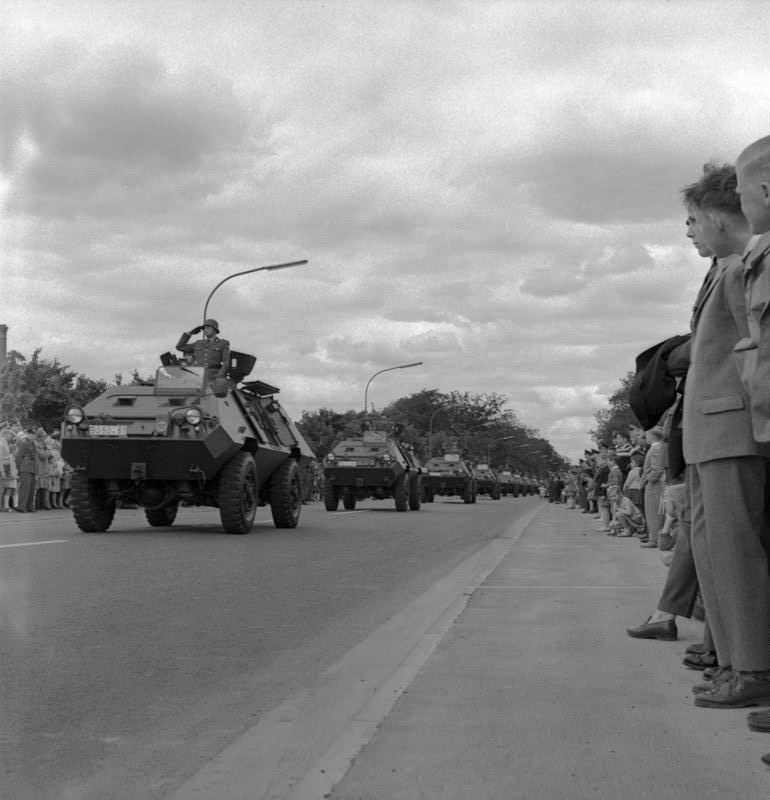
10th anniversary of the Federal Border Guard (BGS, Bundesgrenzschutz) in SW1 armoured personnel carries; parade in the presence of Federal Minister of the Interior Gerhard Schröder and BGS Brigadier General Alfred Samlowski, Lübeck, May 1961.

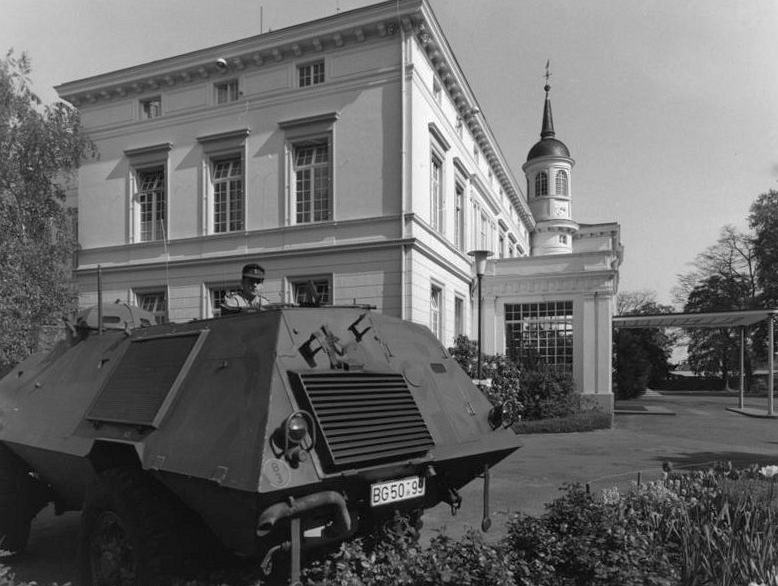
SW1 armoured personnel carrier of the Federal Border Guard (BGS, Bundesgrenzschutz) guarding the Federal Chancellery ("Palais Schaumburg"), Bonn, May 1975.

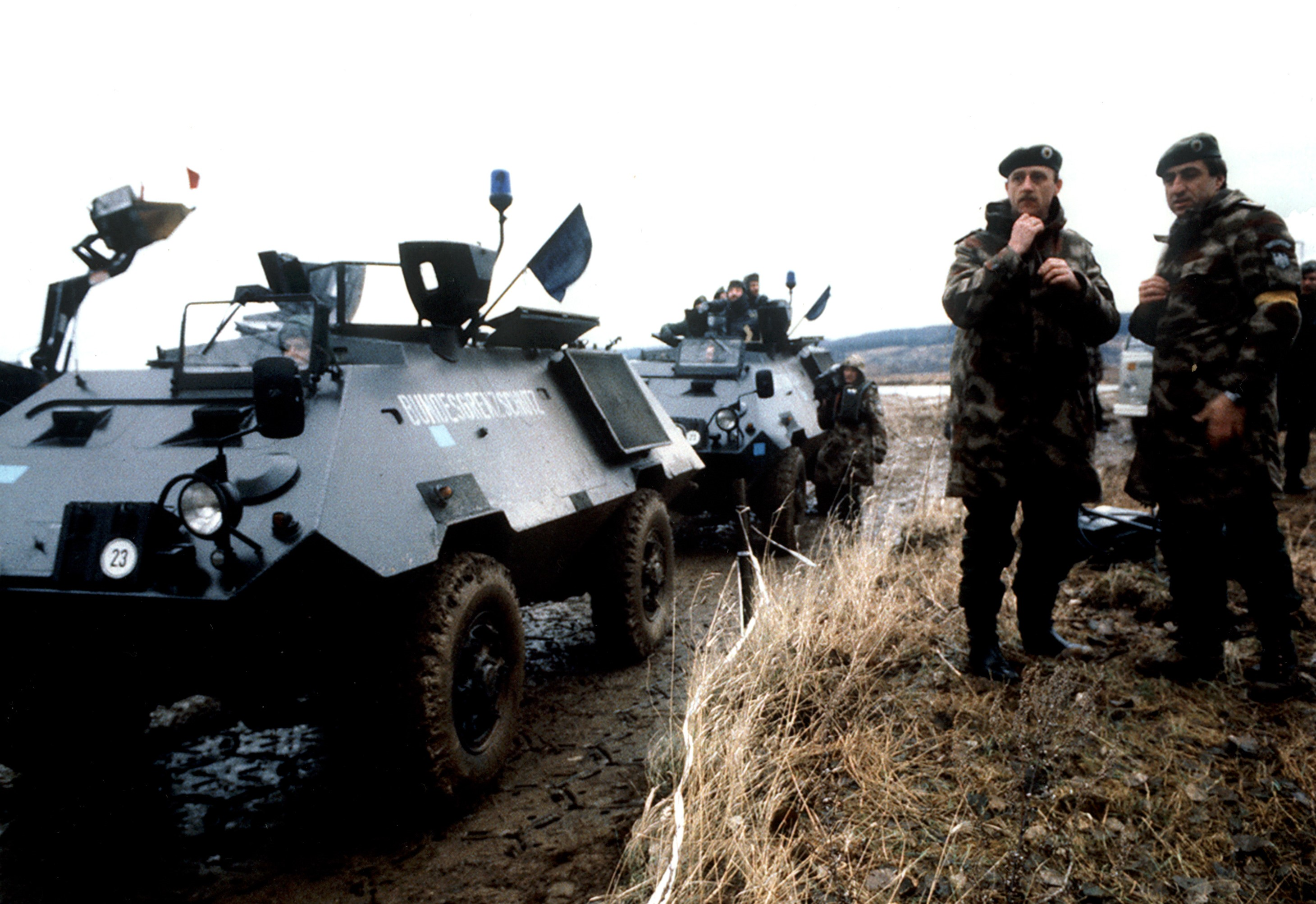
SW1 armoured personnel carriers of the Federal Border Guard (BGS, Bundesgrenzschutz) taking part in Exercise Reforger, West Germany, 1986.
