= MI AC PR mine =

Series of anti-tank mines

The MI AC PR are a series of French minimum metal blast resistant mine anti-tank blast mines. The mines can be laid by hand or automatically from the Matenin mine laying system at a rate of 500 per hour. The mines use a clockwork arming delay, which can also self neutralize the mine after a set period. They have a secondary fuze well in the base that allows anti-handling devices to be fitted.

The mine is still in production and is in service with the French army, as well as a number of others.

== Specifications ==
- Length: 282 mm
- Width 188 mm
- Height: 104 mm
- Weight: 5.67 kg
- Explosive content: 3.94 kg of TNT

== Variants ==
- MI AC PR F1
- MI AC PR F2
- MI AC PR H - fitted with a carrying handle.
