= Mowag Spy =

MOWAG SPY 4x4
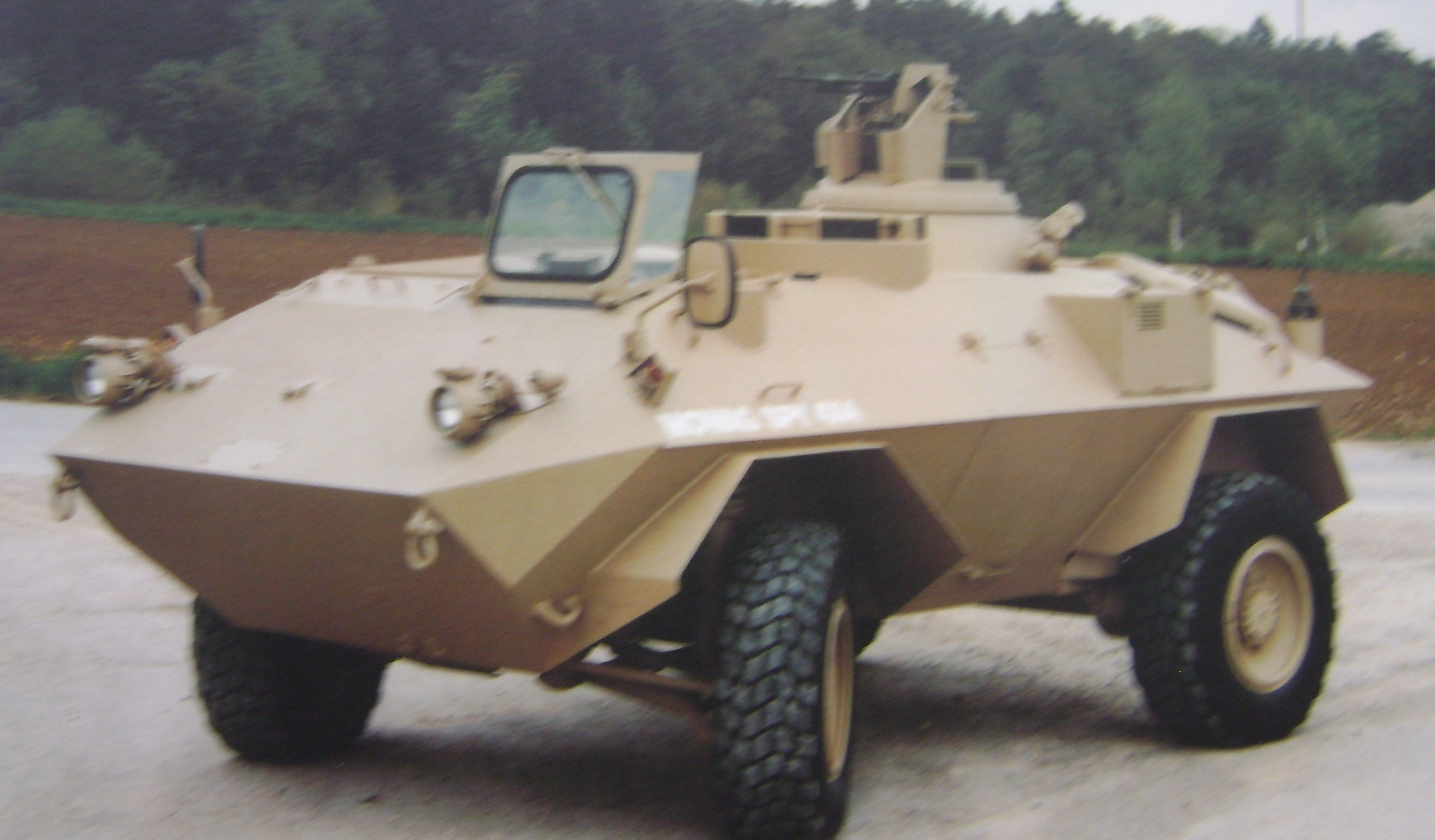
- MOWAG SPY 4x4
- Type: Scout car
- Place of origin: Switzerland

Production history
- Designer: MOWAG Motor Car Factory, Kreuzlingen, Switzerland
- Manufacturer: MOWAG
- Produced: since 1980
- Variants: Armt, recon

Specifications
- Mass: 5,700 kg (12,600 lb)
- Length: 4.55m
- Width: 2.5m
- Height: 1.66m
- Crew: 3
- Main armament: 1x 12.7mm MG and 1x 7.62mm MG
- Engine: Detroit V8 diesel 143 kW / 295hp
- Transmission: Alison AT-545 automatic, 4 forward gears, 1 reverse gear
- Suspension: 4x4 wheeled, TYRES 13.00 x 20 run-flat (insert)
- Fuel capacity: 200 l
- Operational range: 700 km (41l/100km)
- Maximum speed: 110 km/h (68 mph),
- Steering system: 1 axel

The Mowag Spy is a derivative of the Mowag Piranha 4x4, it is smaller and more lightly armored. Designed as recon vehicle it succeeded as a security vehicle in places like airports.

It was designed to be operated by a crew of three and could be fitted with various weapon configurations. These configurations being a one man non-powered turret with a 12.7mm machine gun and a 7.62mm machine gun, or a remotely controlled turret with either a 7.62mm machine gun, or a 20mm autocannon. It could also be fitted with a variety or radar installations. It didn't enter serial production and was never used operationally.
