= Bombrini-Parodi-Delfino =

- Industry: Gunpowder and munitions
- Founded: 1912
- Defunct: 1968
- Fate: Acquired by SNIA S.p.A.
- Successor: SNIA-BPD
- Headquarters: Colleferro, Italy

Bombrini-Parodi-Delfino (better known as BPD), was a chemical company founded in 1912 by Giovanni Bombrini and Leopoldo Parodi-Delfino to produce gunpowder and explosives. Around its location in Colleferro (south of Rome) soon grew a small town attracting manpower from the nearby farms. After World War I, BPD expanded its activities on fertilizers and cement at nearby Segni (Società Calce e Cementi). In 1938 an explosion in the gunpowder plant killed 60 people. After World War II, BPD diversified into metalworking, textiles and chemistry. The last remaining owner, the Parodi-Delfino family, entered a joint venture with SNIA-Viscosa in 1968. SNIA's chemical division was thereafter named SNIA BPD until BPD was sold to Simmel Difesa, when it was renamed SNIA SpA.

== BPD contribution to missile research ==
BPD played an important role in developing missile solid fuels. In 1952, on behalf of the Aeronautica Militare, BPD patented a solid fuel based on nitro-glycerine and cellulose nitrate, the first step in developing experimental missiles on an industrial scale. The Aeronautica_Militare also contracted BPD to develop a meteorological missile, called the 160-70, employing two propulsion systems. The 160-70 was successfully employed in many launches between 1961 and 1963. In 1961, state and private companies merged; publicly owned Finmeccanica and the private firms BPD and FIAT were incorporated into the Società Generale Missilistica Italiana.

SNIA-BPD also developed a series of air-to-surface rockets in the 1980s, as part of the Medusa rocket system. The rockets were of 51-mm, 81-mm, and 122-mm caliber.

== Bibliography ==
- AA.VV:, Le attività spaziali italiane dal dopoguerra all’istituzione dell’Agenzia Spaziale Italiana, Agenzia Spaziale Europea
