= Pirat =

Pirat may refer to:

- Mowag 3M1 Pirat
- Mowag Pirat
