= Mowag 4x4 armored reconnaissance vehicle (armored dummy) =

MOWAG armored reconnaissance vehicle
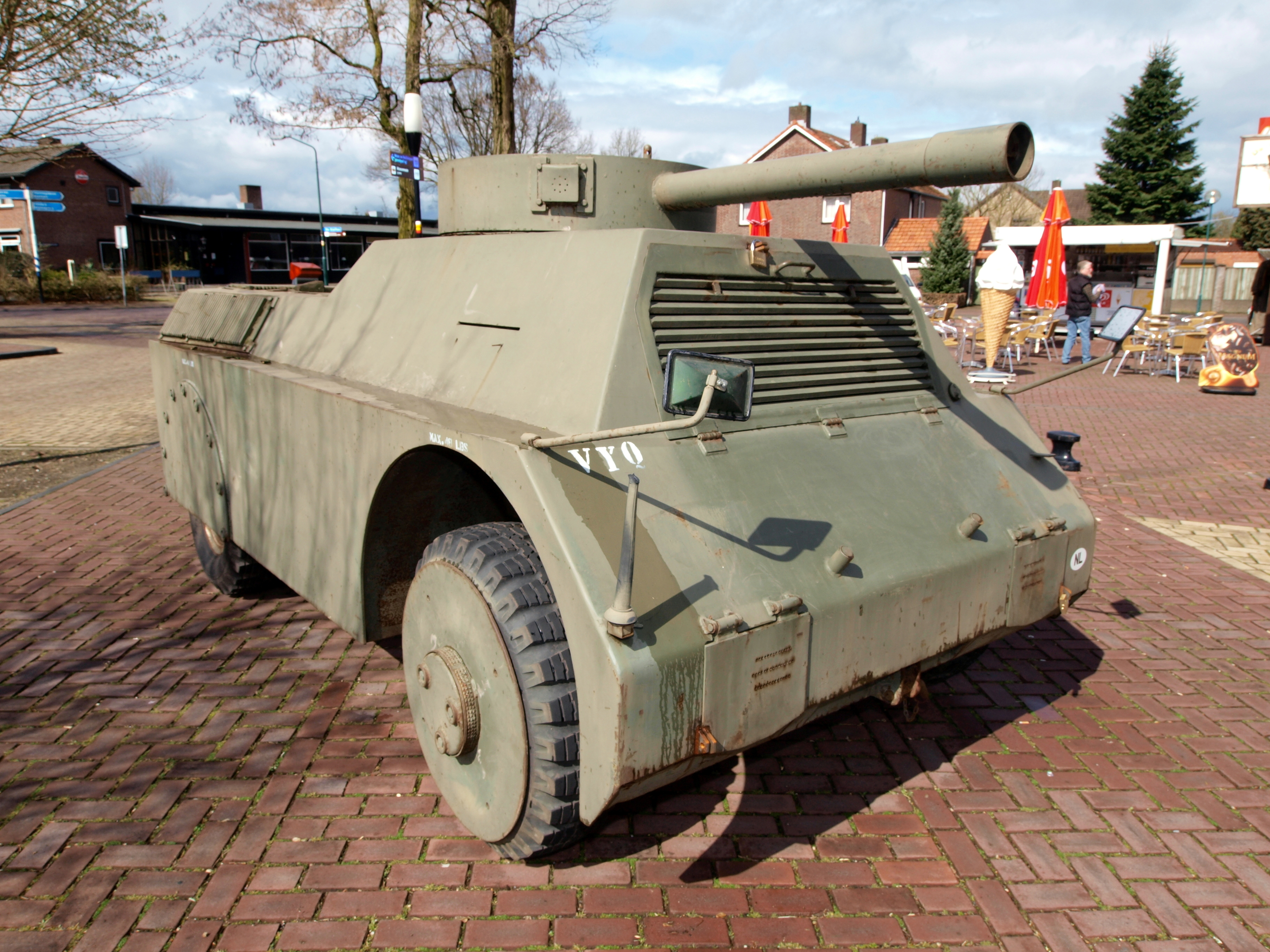
- MOWAG armored reconnaissance vehicle
- Place of origin: Switzerland

Service history
- In service: 1954 - 1987
- Used by: Switzerland

Production history
- Manufacturer: MOWAG
- No. built: 240
- Variants: target dummy

Specifications
- Mass: 5,250 kg (11,570 lb) (full)
- Length: 4 m
- Width: 2.056 m
- Height: 1.945 m
- Crew: 1 driver + 2 passengers
- Main armament: unarmed
- Engine: Dodge 6 cylinder inline engine T-137 3770cm 103 hp
- Transmission: 4 forward gears 1 reverse
- Suspension: 4x4 wheeled
- Maximum speed: 57 km/h (35 mph)

The Mowag 4x4 armored dummy is a target practice vehicle used by the armed forces of Switzerland.

== History ==
Originally designed as an armored reconnaissance vehicle, the armored dummy tank is based on a Mowag T1 4x4 GW 3500 chassis. It was used as a moving target for the armor Wurfgranate (exercise) as well as for practice with shells of rocket tube (20mm insert operation), the SIG SG 510 assault rifle and practice with hand grenades. 240 units were built and used by the Swiss army from 1954 to 1987.

The vehicle with the number M+83124 is now located at the Schweizerisches Militärmuseum Full.

== See also ==
- Zielfahrzeug 68 tracked target tank
- Target practice
- Military dummy
