= Mowag Ortsdienstwagen =

Delivery truck by company known for Military vehicles

MOWAG Postal service Ortsdienstwagen
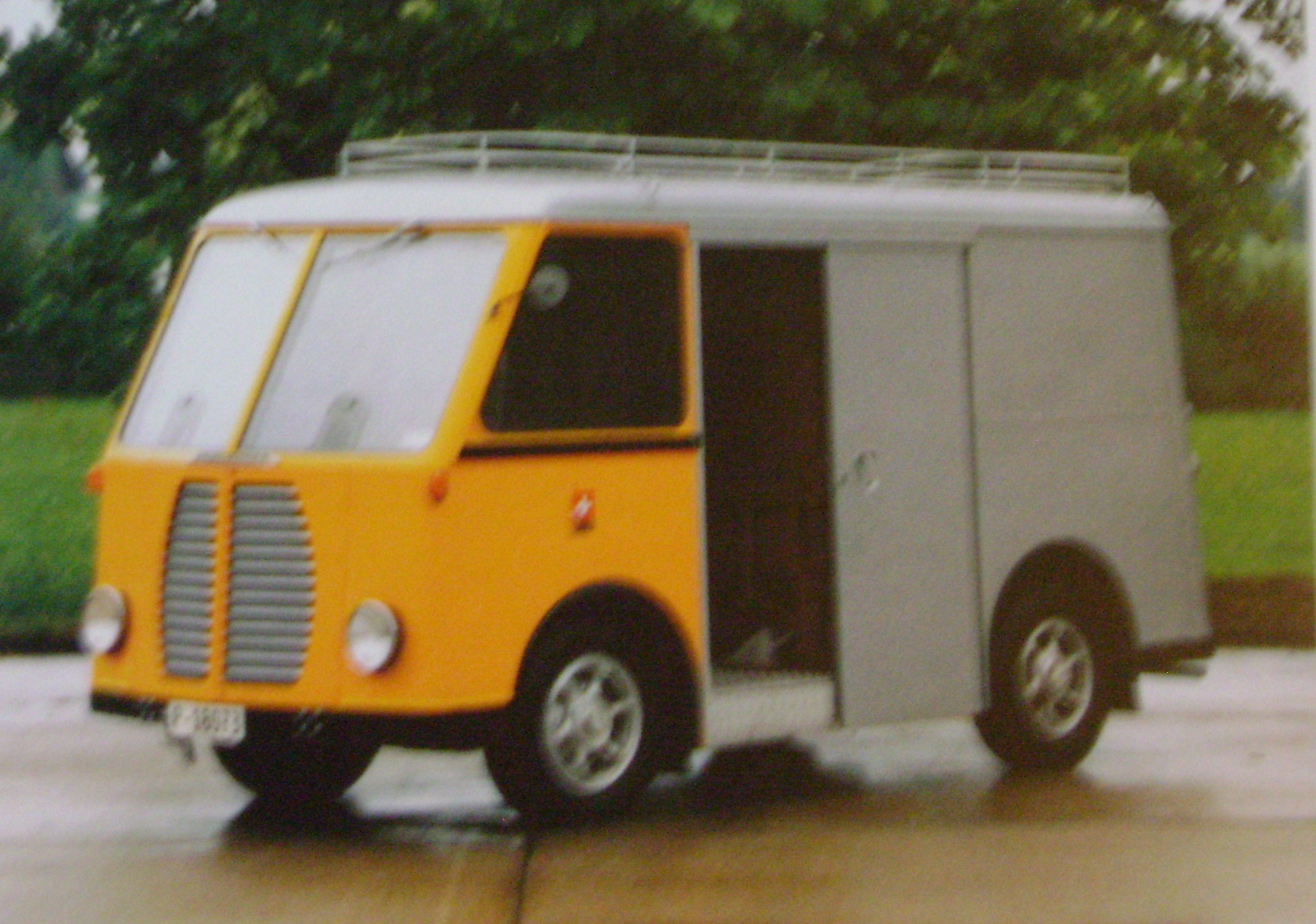
- MOWAG Postal service Ortsdienstwagen
- Place of origin: Switzerland

Service history
- Used by: Switzerland PTT Swiss Post

Production history
- Designed: 1949
- Manufacturer: MOWAG
- No. built: 214
- Variants: delivery van

Specifications
- Mass: 2,140 kg (4,720 lb)
- Length: 2.05 m (81 in)
- Width: 4.57 m (180 in)
- Height: 2.24 m (88 in)
- Crew: 1 driver + 1 pax
- Engine: Waukesha engine 4cylinder 11.32 hp
- Transmission: Borg - Warner 4-speed transmission.
- Suspension: 2x4 wheeled
- Maximum speed: 65 km/h (40 mph)

In 1949 the Postal Telegraph and Telephone (Switzerland) ordered 214 MOWAG local company cars (German Ortsdienstwagen). The vehicles had a right steering and space for a passenger. From the cab you can get into the cargohold, The cargohold can be left on both sides by sliding doors. The body is made with tapered pins and secured with 4 screws and can be removed easily with the help of Hissösen, the car was very easy to maintain so that the PTT own vehicle maintenance companies could change with little effort within 3 hours the engine and transmission.
