= MOWAG-AEG =

Aircraft tractor formerly used by the Swiss Airforce

MOWAG-AEG Flugzeugschlepper
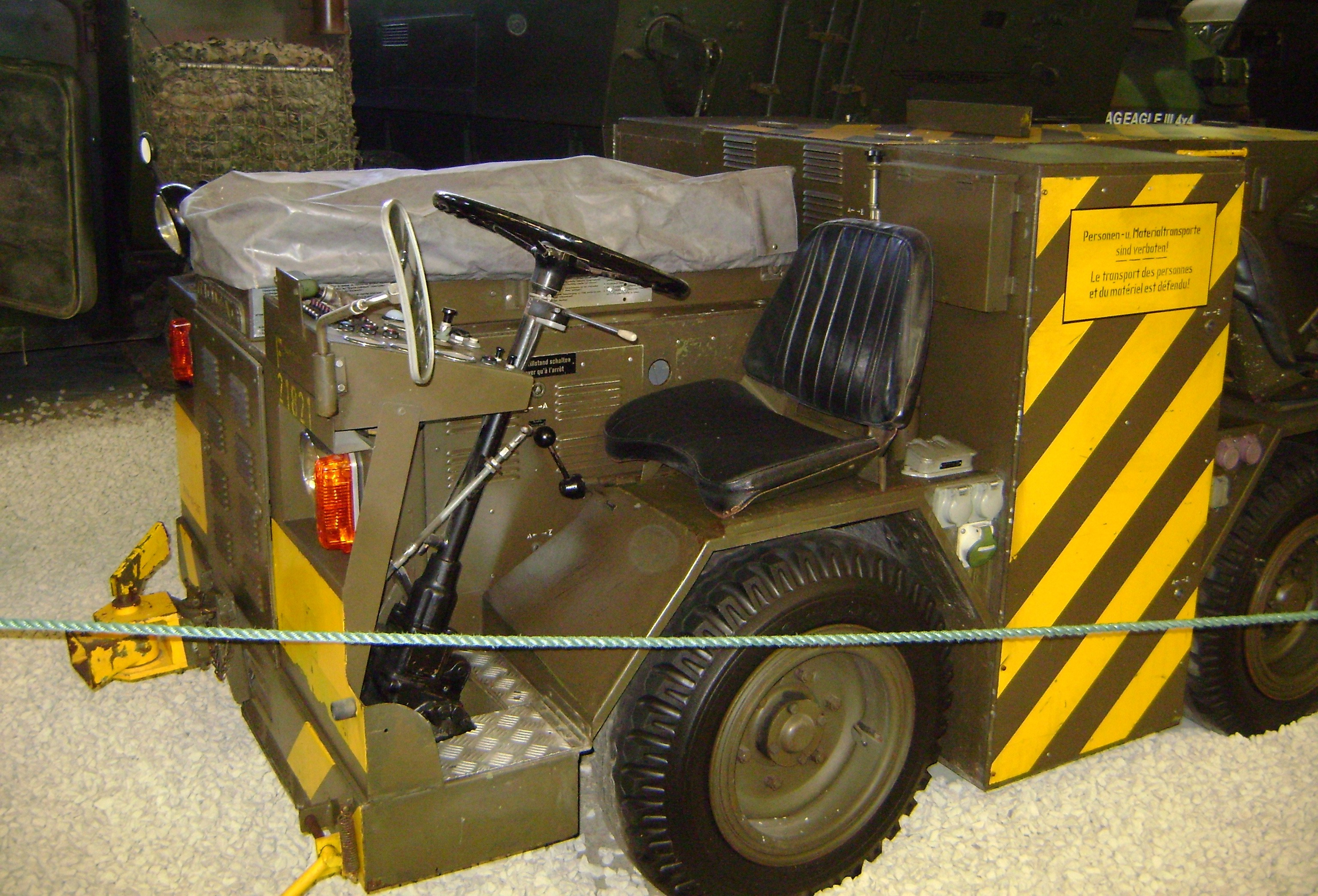
- MOWAG-AEG Flugzeugschlepper
- Place of origin: Switzerland

Service history
- In service: 1967 - 2003
- Used by: Switzerland: Swiss Air Force

Production history
- Manufacturer: MOWAG and AEG
- No. built: 37

Specifications
- Mass: 3050 kg
- Crew: 1 +2Pax
- Engine: 6 cylinder engine MWM D 208-6, displacement 4463 cc 62 kW
- Transmission: electric traction motor
- Suspension: 2x4 wheeled
- Maximum speed: 30 km/h

The MOWAG-AEG Flugzeugschlepper, meaning aircraft tug, is a military vehicle from Switzerland.

== History and development ==
In cooperation with AEG built MOWAG 37 aircraft tug named Flz Sch 4x2 for the Swiss Air Force. The vehicles were used primarily to move the Dassault Mirage IIIS and Mirage III RS in and out of the aircraft caverns. A special feature compared to other aircraft tugs (e.g. Bucher aircraft tractor) was that in these, the aircraft could be suspended during the journey of the towing hook to keep the time between leaving the cavern and the lift off of the Mirage short.

The Mirage began immediately upon leaving the "Vorstollens" to start their engine. Once the engine was running, the latch was released by the tractor driver and he drove from the plane away and turned to the right, so the Mirage freely under its own power could roll on the taxiway to the runway.

The aircraft tractors were in use from 1967 to 2003 by the Swiss Air Force. One is now part of the Military museum Full.
