= Bucher FS 10 Flugzeugschlepper 78 =

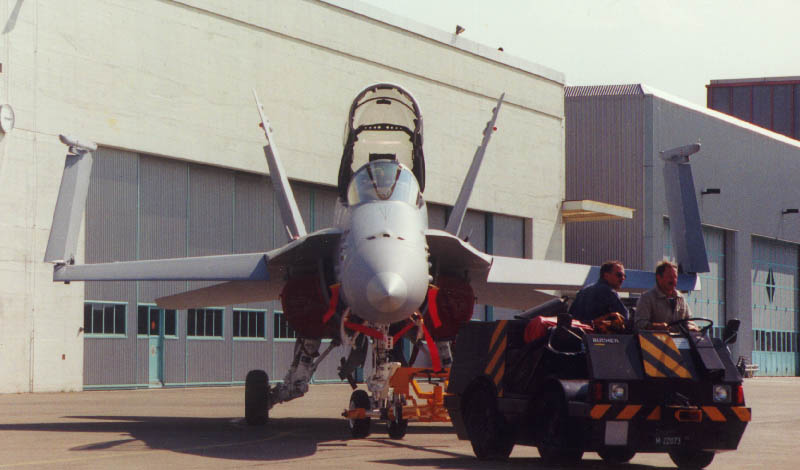
- Bucher aircraft tractor
- Place of origin: Switzerland

Service history
- In service: 1978 - present
- Used by: Swiss Air Force and JuAir

Production history
- Designer: Bucher-Guyer AG
- Manufacturer: Mowag
- Produced: 1978 - 1983
- No. built: 86

Specifications
- Mass: 2,750 kg
- Length: 3.0 m
- Width: 1.50 m
- Height: 1.30 m
- Crew: 1 (room for 2 passengers)
- Engine: Mercedes-Benz OM617 4-stroke diesel 5-cyl 3L
- Payload capacity: 450 kg
- Transmission: four-speed automatic
- Suspension: 2x4 wheeled
- Fuel capacity: 65 liters
- Operational range: 80km
- Maximum speed: 25 km/h forward, 18km/h reverse

The Bucher FS 10 Flugzeugschlepper 78 is an aircraft tow vehicle built for the Swiss Air Force by the military vehicle division of Bucher-Guyer AG. Following a restructuring of this division it was sold to Mowag which is now responsible for support.

The Bucher FS 10 Flugzeugschlepper 78 is very compact as it is designed to operate in the Swiss Air Force's aircraft caverns (or underground hangars). It runs on diesel fuel to lower the risk of fire. For precise maneuvering around the caverns, pilot tunnels and shelters it is equipped with special downward-shining floor lighting headlights to help the driver to follow floor markings. It is also used to provide a power supply to aircraft without an Auxiliary power unit. It is used as well as tractors for about 1-4 engine start units or for ad hoc transport of mechanics and tools (e.g. spare wheel and jack by a flat tire of a landed aircraft). JuAir at Dübendorf Air Base is the only civil user of this aircraft tug type. The aircraft tractors are equipped with four quick couplings as standard. This allows them to be loaded with a crane, in a short time, on every flatbed truck of the Swiss military. The Bucher FS 10 Flugzeugschlepper 78 are street-legal, but with their 80 km range and permitted maximum speed of 25 km/h, however, are not independently suitable for ad-hoc transfers. An ad-hoc capability was achieved with the 4 crane couplings. Such ad-hoc transfers were part of the concept of the Swiss Air Force in the Cold War. It was anticipated to use various motorway sections of the Motorways of Switzerland as air force bases. This was also done several times in exercises. In these exercises the Bucher FS 10 Flugzeugschlepper 78 was involved. For example, the "U TAUTO" exercise on March 24, 1982, the Bucher FS 10 Flugzeugschlepper 78 were stationed at the Rest area "Windrose" near Münsingen. JuAir at Dübendorf AFB is the only civil user of this aircraft tug type.

== Specifications ==
- Drive axle rear differential lock
- Drum brakes on all wheels
- Tubeless tires 5 bars (73 psi)
- Wheelbase 1.4 metres (4.6 ft)
- Track 1.236 metres (4.06 ft)
- Turning radius 6.55 metres (21.49 ft)
- Ground clearance 14 centimetres (5.5 in)
