= Mowag =

Swiss military vehicle manufacturer

European Land Systems - MOWAG
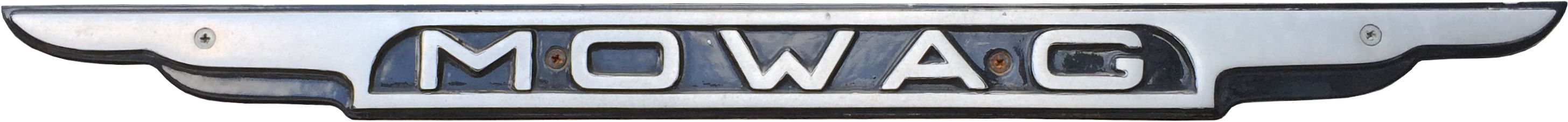

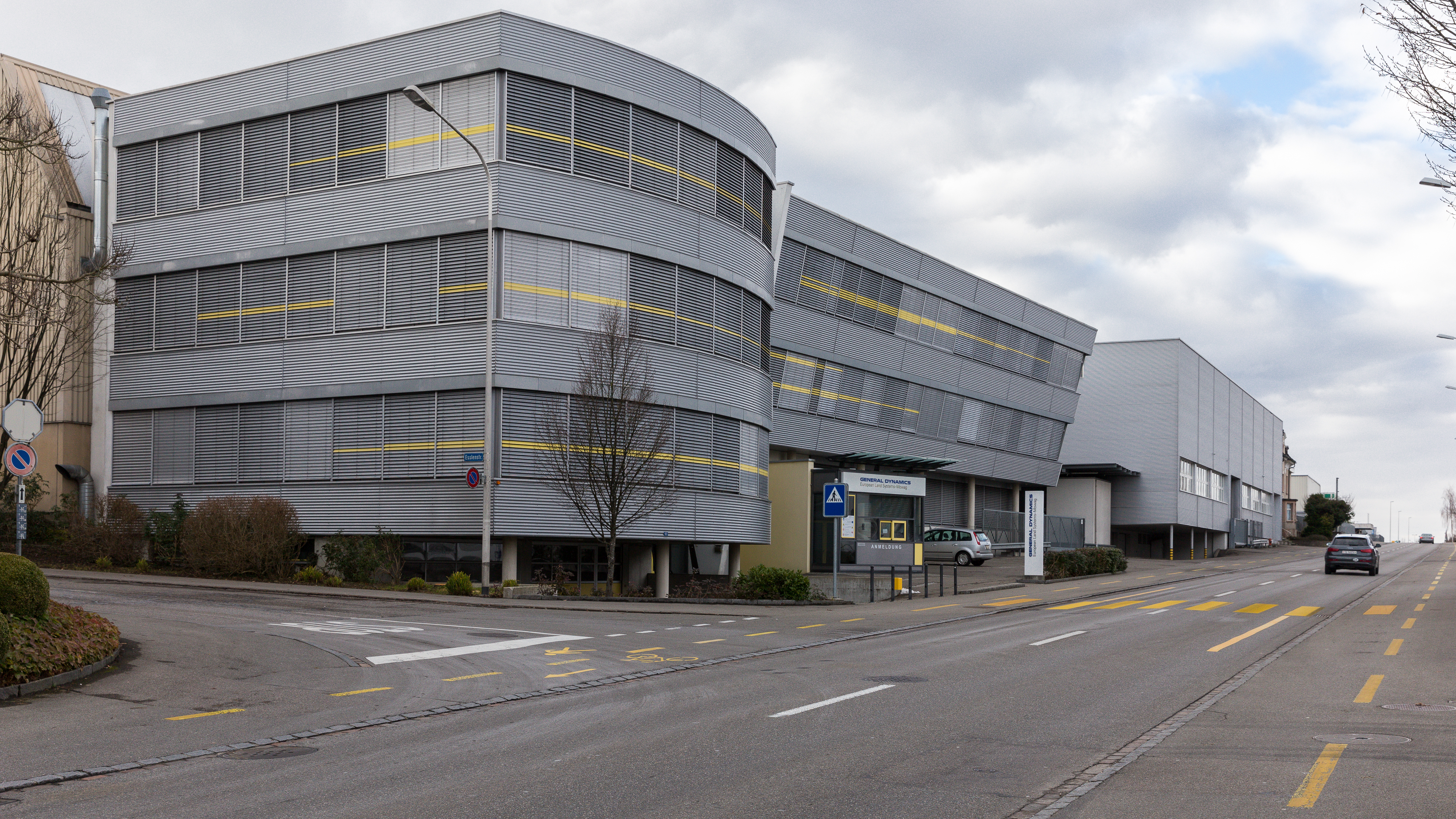
- Company type: Subsidiary
- Industry: Defence
- Founded: 1950; 76 years ago
- Founders: Walter Ruf
- Fate: Acquired by General Motors Canada in 1999 General Motors Canada was acquired by General Dynamics in 2003 Mowag becomes GDELS Mowag GmbH in 2004
- Headquarters: Kreuzlingen (TG), Switzerland
- Area served: Worldwide
- Products: Mowag Piranha; Mowag Eagle; Mowag Duro
- Website: www.gdels.com

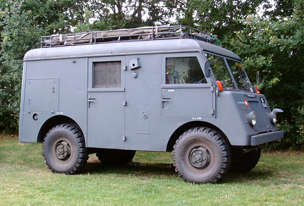
Mowag military signals carrier (radio truck) from 1957.

Mowag is a Swiss company founded in 1950, which develops, designs and produces armoured fighting vehicles for military applications in both land-only and amphibious configurations. These vehicles have gross vehicle weights ranging from 9 tonnes to 30 tonnes. Since 2003, the company belongs to General Dynamics, and is now known as GDELS-Mowag, part of General Dynamics European Land Systems (GDELS).

== History ==
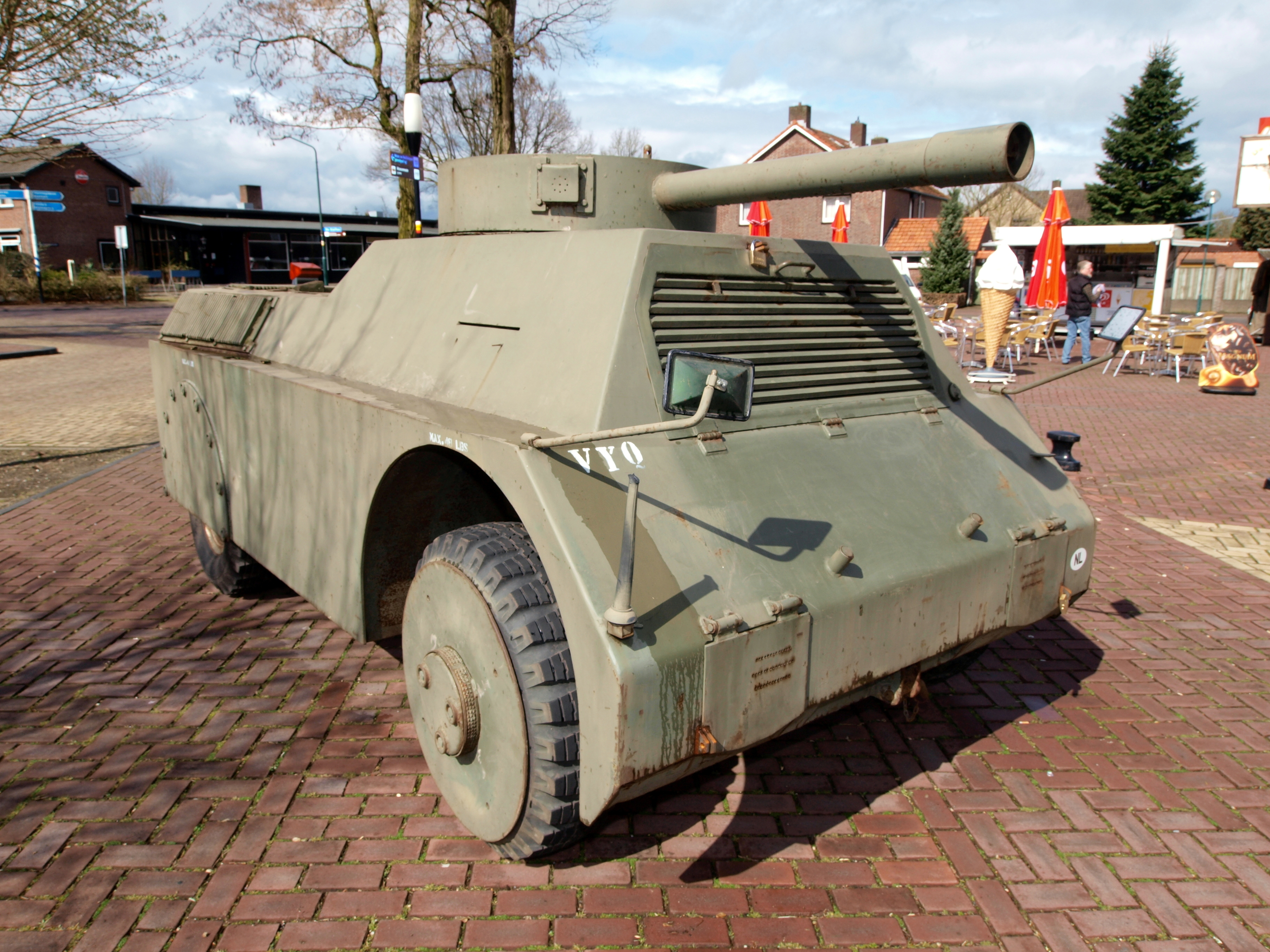
Mowag Dumitank

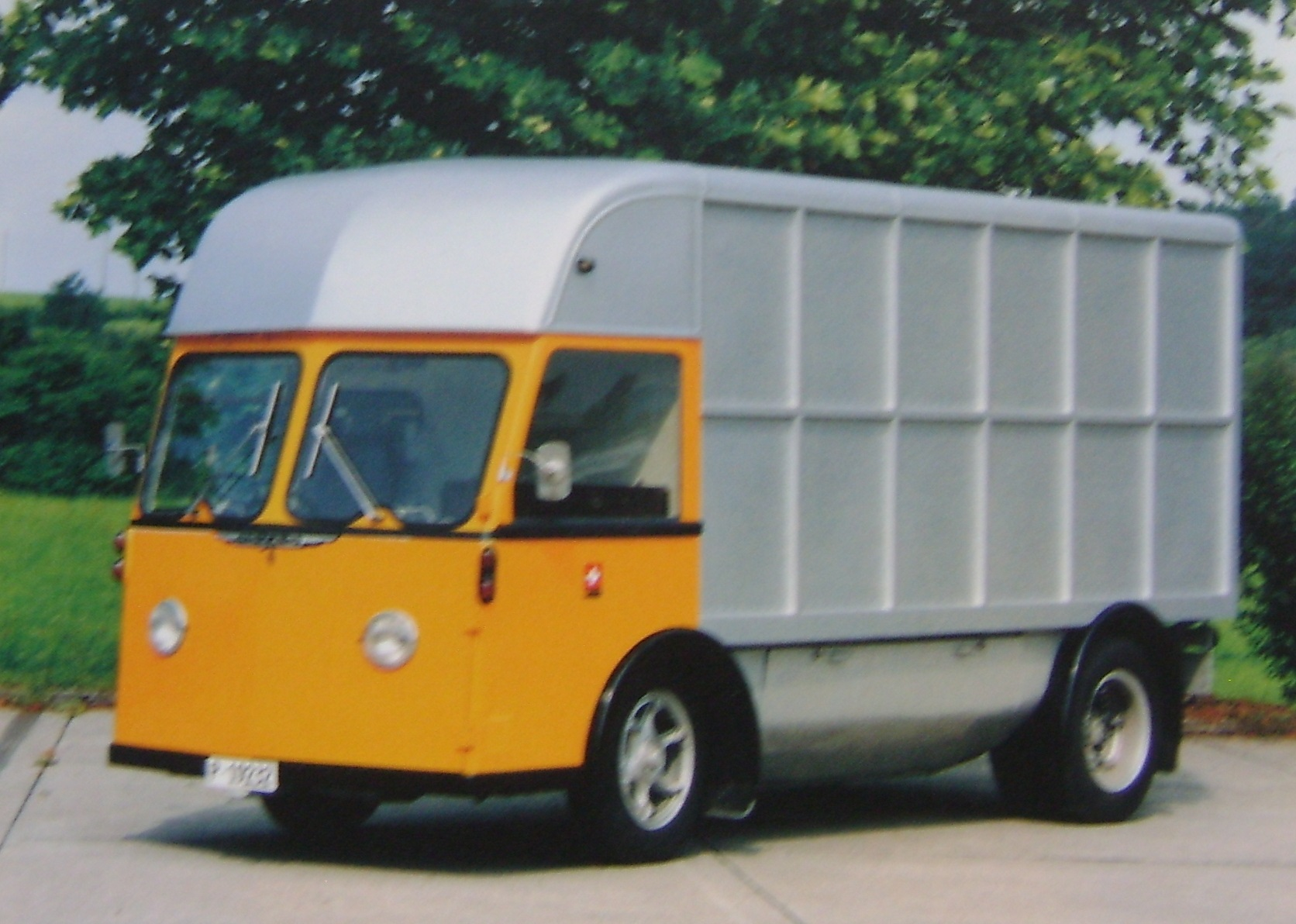
Mowag Furgeon PTT

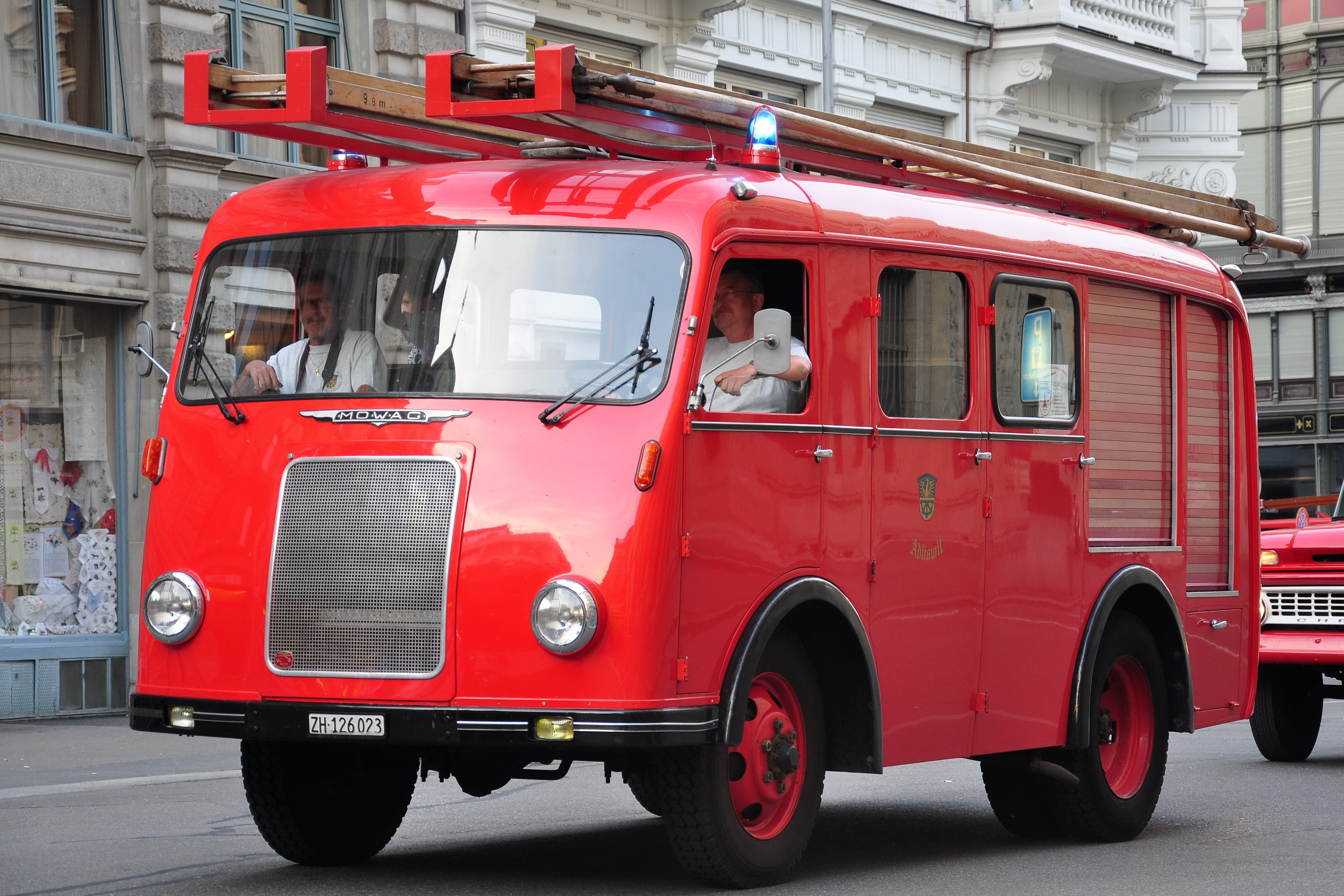
Mowag fire engine

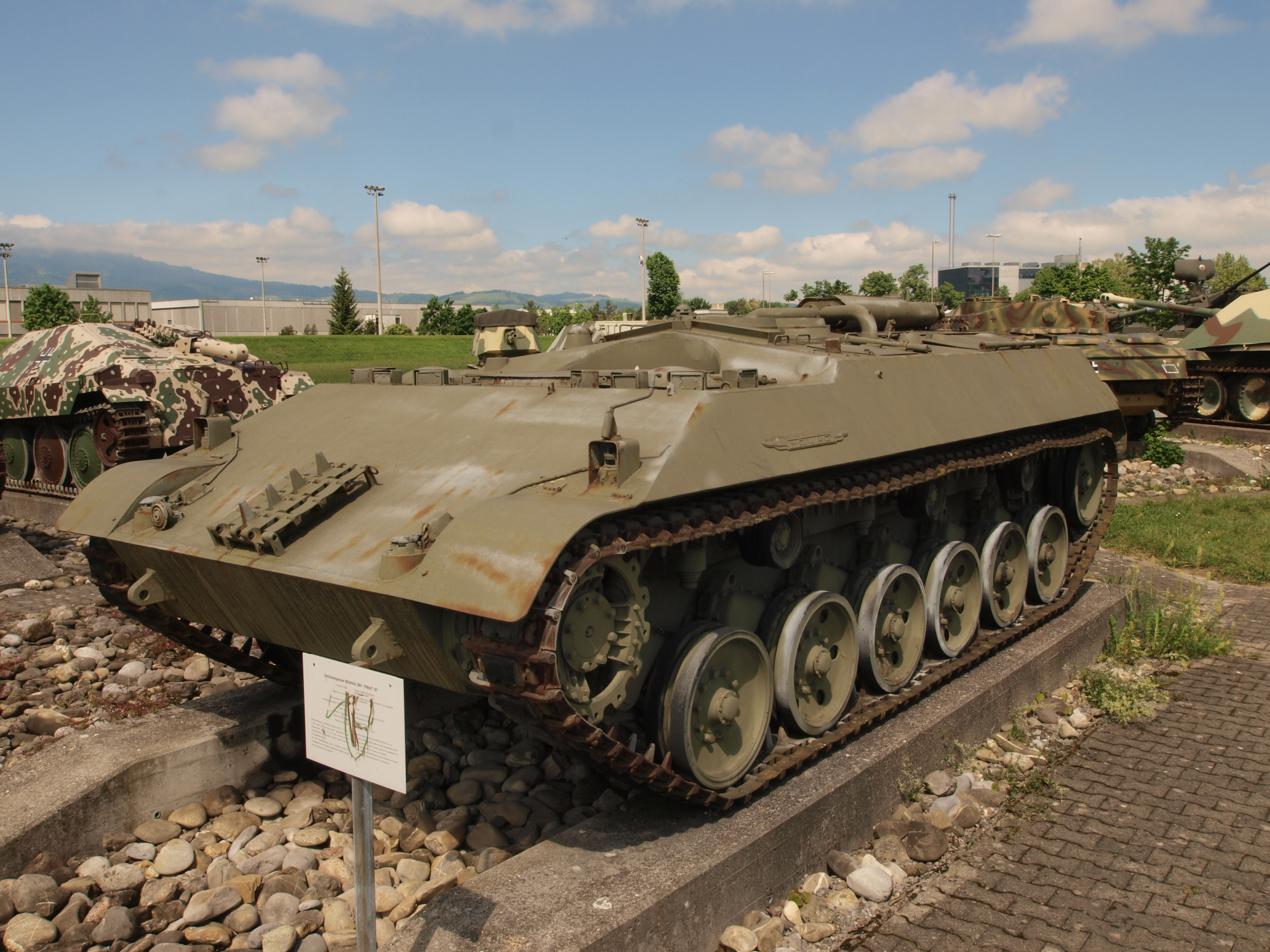
Mowag 3M1 'Pirat 18

The Mowag GmbH, originally Mowag Motorwagenfabrik AG (translated: "Motor Car Factory"), was founded in 1950 as a privately owned company by engineer, Walter Ruf. During the past 50 years Mowag has concentrated on the development and production of specialised vehicles.

Its initial success was the development and production of more than 1,600 troop carriers, the Mowag T1 4×4 for the Swiss Army. Contracts for Germany followed, with 750 Mowag MR 8 series armoured wheeled vehicles produced for the German Bundesgrenzschutz (Federal Border Guard) also later used by Spain, and built under licence in Germany. Further high-powered wheeled and tracked vehicle series were developed and manufactured for the world markets.

Mowag has built many different types of vehicles, such as ambulances, fire trucks, like the Mowag W300, dummy tanks, electric vehicles, scooters or tracked tanks. In the civilian sector, Mowag has been particularly active in the construction of fire-fighting vehicles where several generations of emergency vehicles have been built on Dodge pickups. Many models were based on factory designed firefighting trucks. In Germany, Mowag was well known for developing a four-wheel drive armoured car, that was built under licence from Thyssen and Bussing/Henschel.

In 1963, vehicles for the Federal Border Guard (Bundesgrenzschutz = BGS), Mowag's production ran for decades. Mowag had from the beginning to the end of the 1960s, built military vehicles and civilian trucks. Among them were the heavy trucks, Mowag M5-16F with four seats, front steering cabin and 16 tons total weight, tow hitch for a double axle trailer and a 149 kW engine in the underfloor. The engine was mounted under the bed between the front and the rear axles. This allowed a compact design and low centre of gravity in the middle of the vehicle.

In 1950, Mowag produced 214 local official cars for the Swiss Post, the chassis of this small compact vehicle had sliding doors on each side. The truck for Swiss Post (PTT) Mowag Einsatzfourgon of which 556 units were built from 1953 to 1988, had also an underfloor engine. The Furgeon were initially fitted with a V8 petrol engine, which was originally developed for a Mowag tank. Later, diesel engines were installed. The yellow and silver vans had a door in the front of the vehicle on the passenger side, which made it possible to exit from the front if the trucks were parked very close together. On the driver's side was a conventional door. It was possible to get from the cabin into the cargo hold. Taking advantage of this fact, some people rebuilt the decommissioned Furgeons into campers. The Furgeons were equipped with a trailer hitch for 4 wheel trailers. Mowag had developed a replacement vehicle for the Furgeon, but it remained only a pre-series of 22 Trucks, all used by the Swiss Post, as the Swiss Post bought foreign mass-produced series of vehicles.

Besides regular trucks, Mowag has built several generations of long iron transport trucks. A 8×4-driven four-axle truck with an M8TK diesel engine with eight cylinders, 10.8 litres and 373 kW and Allison automatic five-speed transmission, these are characterised by a very narrow central cab, with two seats. They were able to carry the load on the entire length of the vehicle using the space on the left and right side of the driver's cabin. The drivers compartment had a front entering door.

Between 1965 and 1975, Mowag built 170 electric trollies for the Swiss Post. In the 1980s, the products range had been increased by the development and construction of three-wheel and four-wheel electric vehicles. The hospitals, airports, municipalities, industrial companies and the post office came for a variety of their transportation tasks. Many more prototypes of electric cars were built, but none of these vehicles made it to market. For the Mirage IIIS and RS fighter aircraft of the Swiss Air Force, Mowag and AEG worked together and built the aircraft tractor Mowag-AEG. In the 1980s, Mowag built vibratory rollers for road construction. Handheld double vibratory rollers were from 900 kg to 1,300 kg, tandem Vibratory rollers from 2,000 kg to 3,000 kg and 4 "wheeled" rollers from 4.5t to 18t. For several decades Mowag was the sole importer to Switzerland of the Dodge Ram Wagon, these were converted to four-wheel drive fire brigade vehicles, and occasionally police vehicles and ambulances. They were all given the Mowag Insignia on the front. Private individuals were not allowed to purchase new vehicles, however Mowag did sell spare parts to privately owned Dodge Ram Wagons.

Lately, Mowag has been specializing in armoured vehicles for military use, because it is financially more attractive. The main product today is the Piranha. In addition, other armored vehicles are being produced based on the American HMMWV/Mowag Eagle, and the Duro. These vehicles comes from the acquired business of Bucher-Guyer. Also Mowag is responsible for spare parts for the Bucher FS 10 Flugzeugschlepper 78/aircraft tugs who are in use by the Swiss Air Force, Pilatus Aircraft and JuAir.

=== 21st century ===
In 1999 Mowag was acquired by General Motors of Canada and since January 2004, Mowag has been a company within the General Dynamics European Land Systems group.

In 2012, it employed 900 highly skilled personnel at the facility and announced to cut 270 jobs. After the Russian invasion of Ukraine, Mowag was already in contact with Germany regarding orders in May 2022, and in the summer of 2023 advertising job openings in administration, engineering and production. In print ads it used the motto: "swiss made- Kompetenz für Schutz und Sicherheit".

At present it employs around 750 highly skilled personnel at the facility in Kreuzlingen, Switzerland. Mowag continues to operate as a Swiss company, and is organised and incorporated under Swiss law. General Dynamics European Land Systems is part of General Dynamics Corporation (GD). Since 1 April 2010, the company is known as General Dynamics European Land Systems – Mowag GmbH.

== Current products ==
=== Mowag Piranha ===
Piranhas are available in 4×4, 6×6, 8×8, and 10×10 wheel versions. There are several variants within these versions, giving different degrees of armour protection and several kinds of turret, for use in a variety of roles. Piranha derivatives have been assigned roles as troop transports, command vehicles, fire support vehicles, tank trainers, and police vehicles.

Piranhas are used by the Swiss Army. Swiss-built Piranha derivatives have been exported to Sweden, Denmark, Ireland, Romania, Spain, and Belgium. The Romanian and Belgian Armies have selected the Piranha IIIC 8×8. Belgium converted to an all-wheeled force, and replaced all their M113s, AIFVs and Leopard 1s with 268 Piranha IIIC in 7 variants

=== Mowag Eagle ===
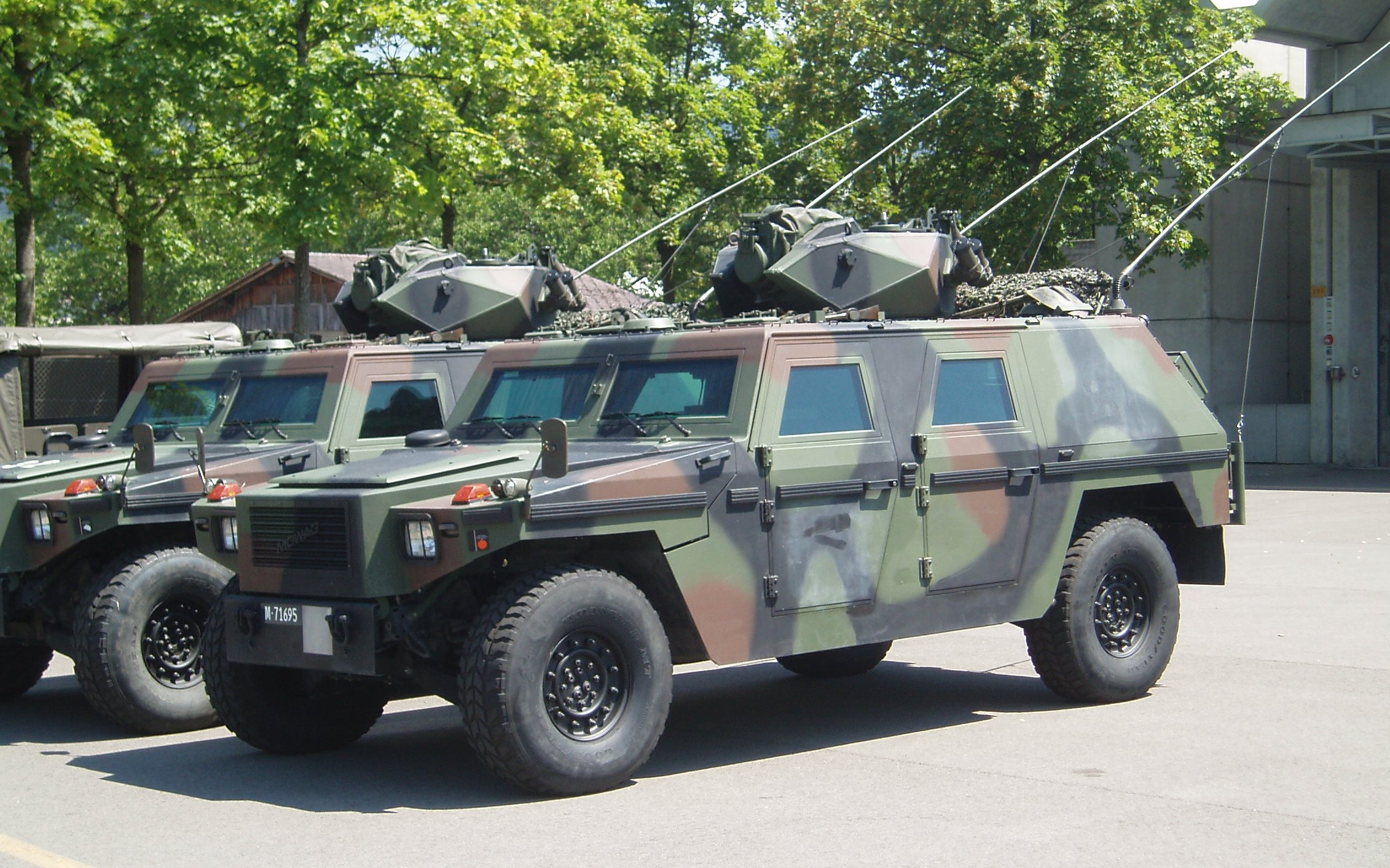
Mowag Eagle

The Mowag Eagle is a lightly-armoured, light tactical vehicle, similar to the American HMMWV. It is designed to fulfill roles such as command, reconnaissance, logistics, and military police. It can have seating for up to six soldiers while still retaining an in-depth communications system and equipment to fit mission requirements. A total of 365 Eagle 4×4 reconnaissance vehicles and 120 Eagle 4×4 artillery forward observation vehicles have been built in the past eight years and are in service with the Swiss and Danish Forces.

The newly developed Eagle IV, based on the DURO, is suitable for reconnaissance, communications and observation, as well as for UN missions and border patrol. The Mowag development on the basis of the proven DURO chassis is distinguished through a very high payload versus a low gross vehicle weight (GVW), with a high ballistic and mine protection level as well as exceptional mobility both on and off-road. Due to the commonality with the DURO family of vehicles, the maintenance and training costs can be kept low in a fleet mission.

A new version of the Eagle was launched by General Dynamics European Land Systems - Mowag GmbH at EUROSATORY 2010 on 14 June 2010.

=== Mowag DURO ===
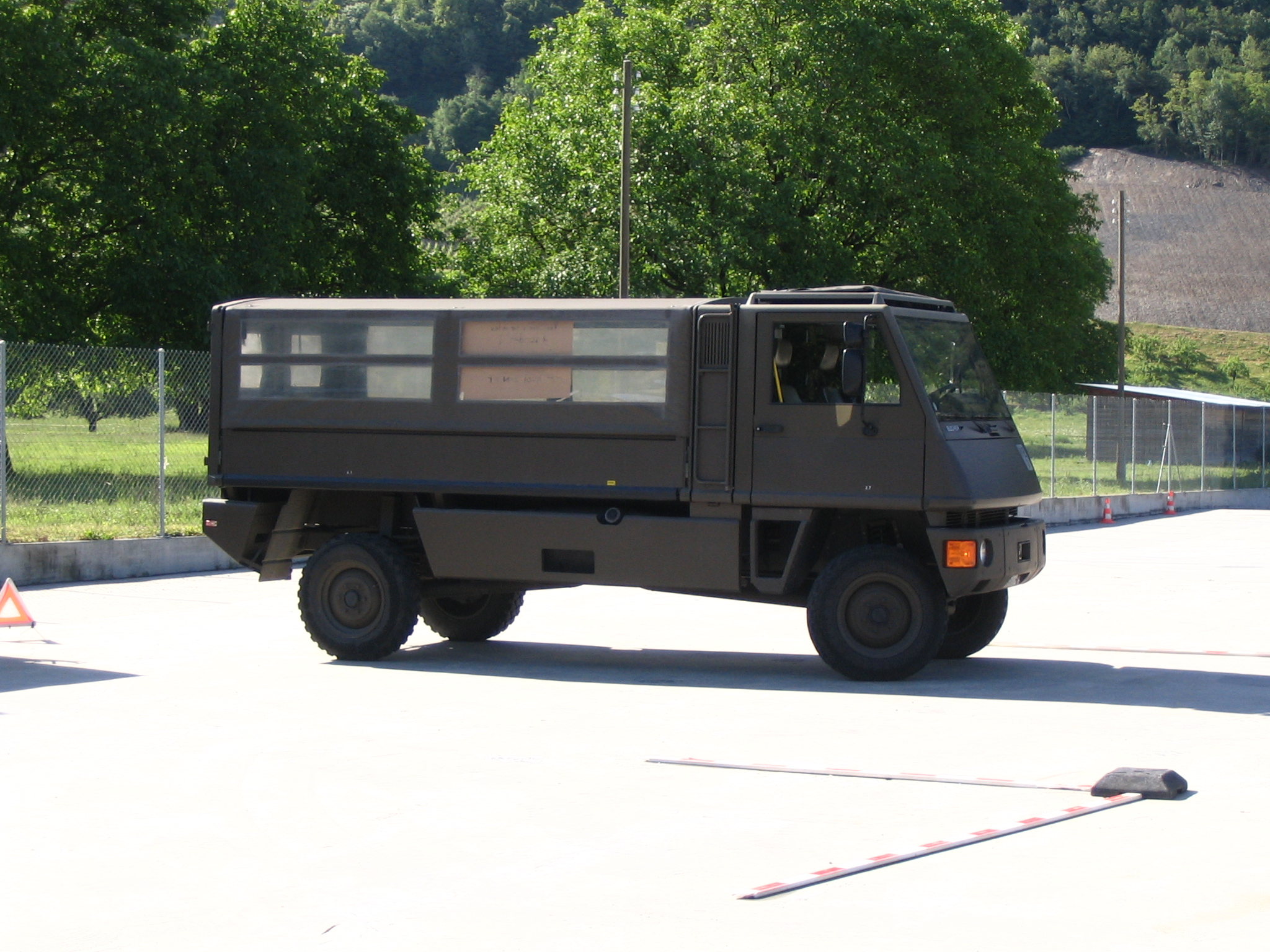
Mowag DURO Swiss Army

The Mowag DURO is a highly mobile, off-road tactical transport vehicle based on the DURO family of vehicles. DURO stands for DUrable and RObust. Initially developed for Switzerland by Bucher-Guyer AG in Niederweningen, Switzerland, who started production of all-wheel-drive trucks in 1976.

An initial 3,000 vehicles order for the Swiss Armed Forces came through in 1994. Over 4,000 DURO 4×4 and 6×6 vehicles are now in service worldwide. The main customers are Switzerland, Germany, Venezuela, Great Britain, and Malaysia. In addition to these, the vehicle is used in many other countries for special purposes. The latest versions are the DURO II and DURO III. Germany has ordered the DURO IIIP 6×6 ballistic and mine protected version.

- Rheinmetall YAK

The YAK is an armoured and mine-protected transport vehicle produced by the German company Rheinmetall Landsysteme AG based on the DURO IIIP chassis. The German Army uses the YAK for its military police, EOD teams, and as an armoured ambulance.

=== Mowag MERLIN ===
A new airborne 4×4 light tactical military vehicle designed to compete against companies like Defenture.

== Former products ==
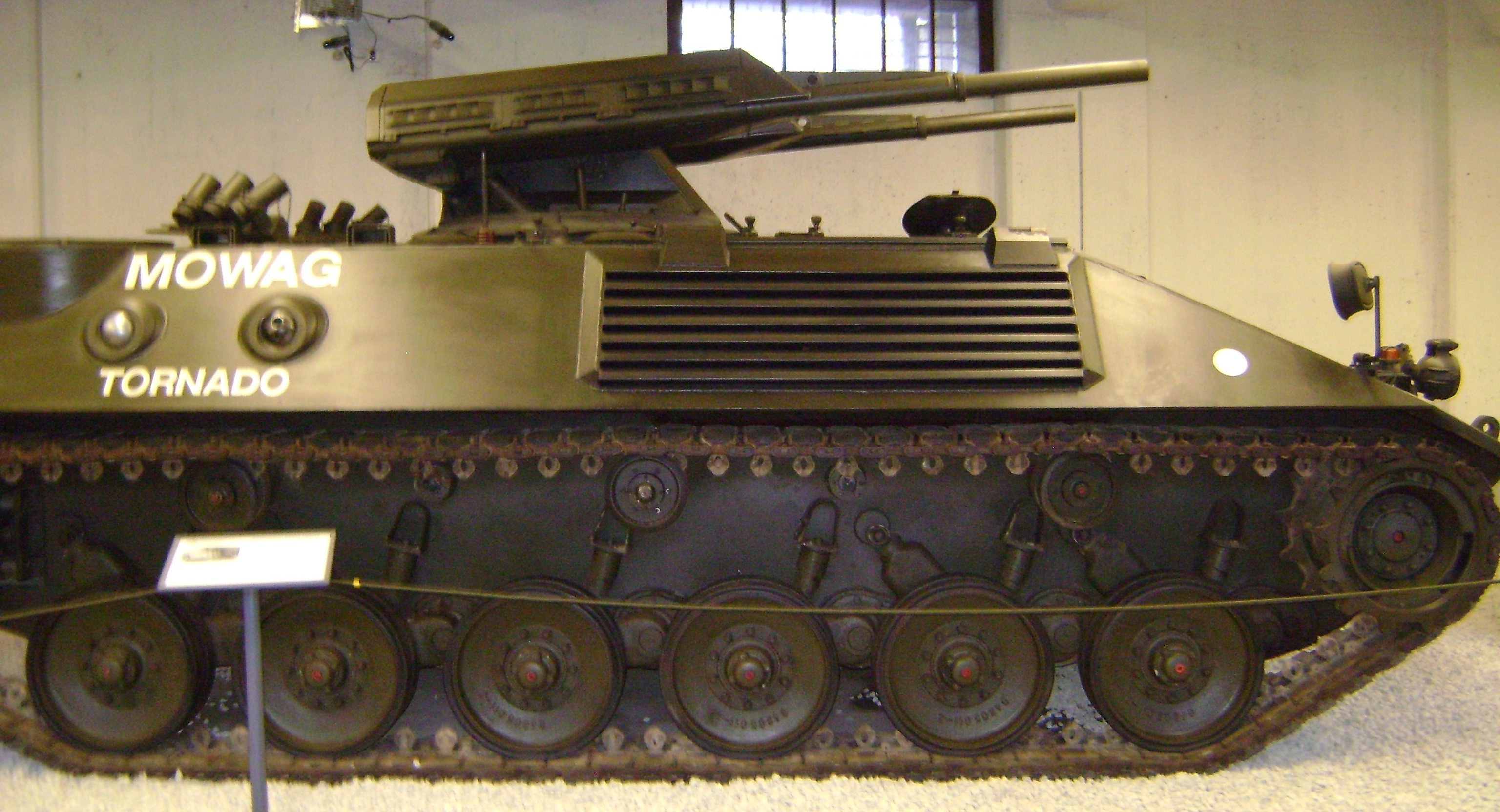
Mowag Tornado 2

From the beginning Mowag produced both armoured and unarmoured vehicles, to include motorcycles and fire appliances.

- Mowag Ortsdienstwagen (Parcel delivery cars for the PTT/The Swiss Federal Postalservice, 214 build)
- Mowag 4×4 armoured reconnaissance vehicle (armoured dummy)
- Mowag Furgeon trucks, 556 build for the PTT/Swiss Federal Postalservice
- Mowag MR 8 – 4×4 wheeled armoured personnel carrier. About 600 built for German Bundesgrenzschutz from 1959.
- Mowag Grenadier – 4×4 wheeled armoured personnel carrier. In production from 1967.
- Mowag Roland – 4×4 small wheeled armoured personnel carrier. In production from 1964.
- Mowag Puma 6×6 wheeled armoured weapons carrier
- Mowag Shark wheeled combat vehicle. 8×8 wheeled armoured weapons carrier designed to carry a number of gun or missile armaments.
- Mowag Spy – 4×4 wheeled light reconnaissance vehicle. Ordered into production in 1982.
- Mowag Tornado infantry fighting vehicle – Tracked Infantry fighting vehicle.
- Mowag Trojan infantry fighting vehicle
- Mowag Mistral amphibious infantry fighting vehicle
- Mowag Pirat infantry fighting vehicle
- Mowag 3M1 Pirat infantry fighting vehicle
- Jagdpanzer Mowag Cheetah (Jagdpanzer = Tankhunter)
- Mowag 4×4 utility vehicle: At the beginning of the 1990s, a programme to select the successor of 4×4 utility vehicles like the Pinzgauer and Haflinger for the Swiss Army took place. This programme saw Bucher-Guyer AG offer the DURO, Mercedes offer the Unimog 140L, and Mowag had their own design.

== Gallery ==
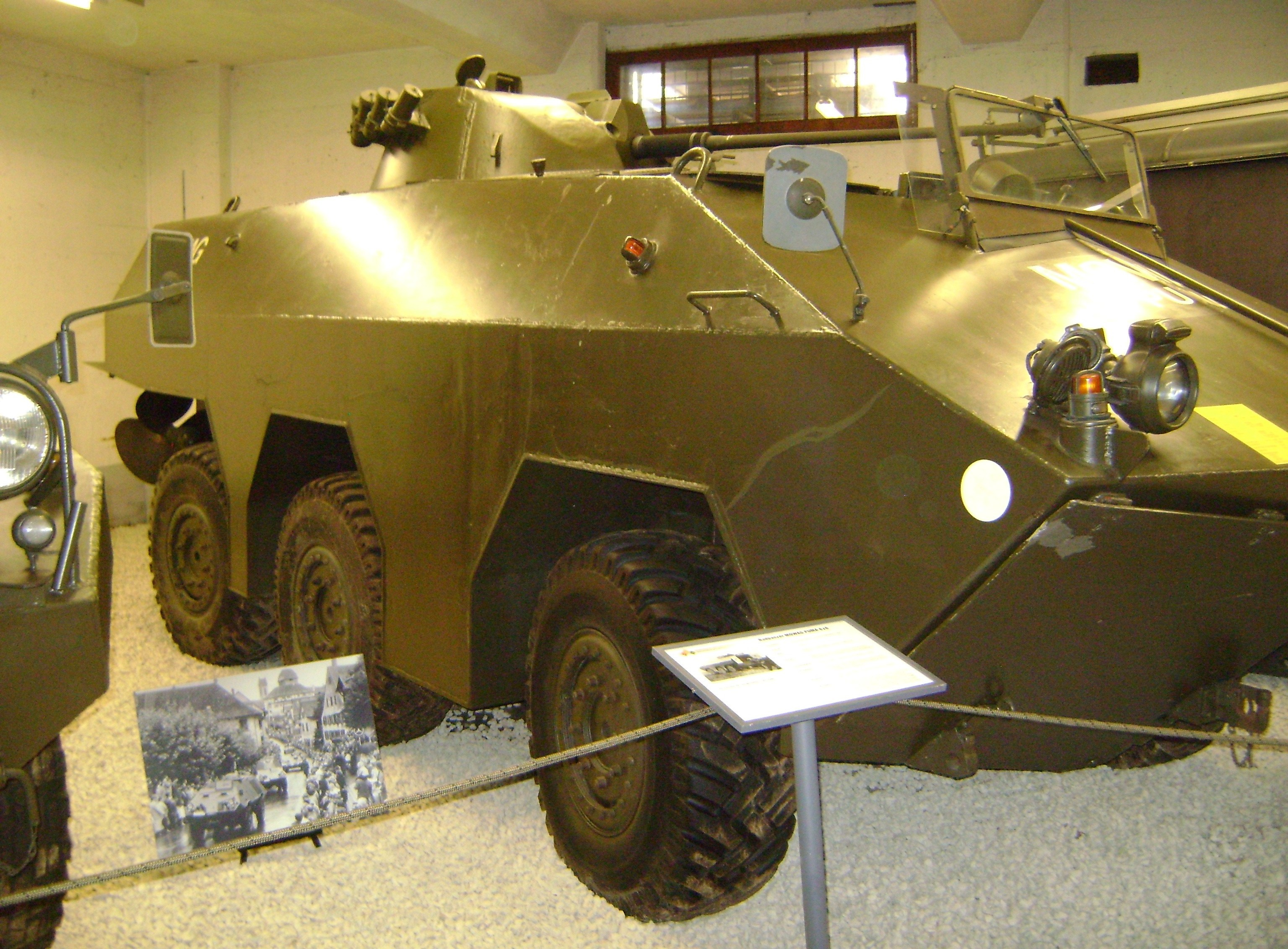
Mowag Puma

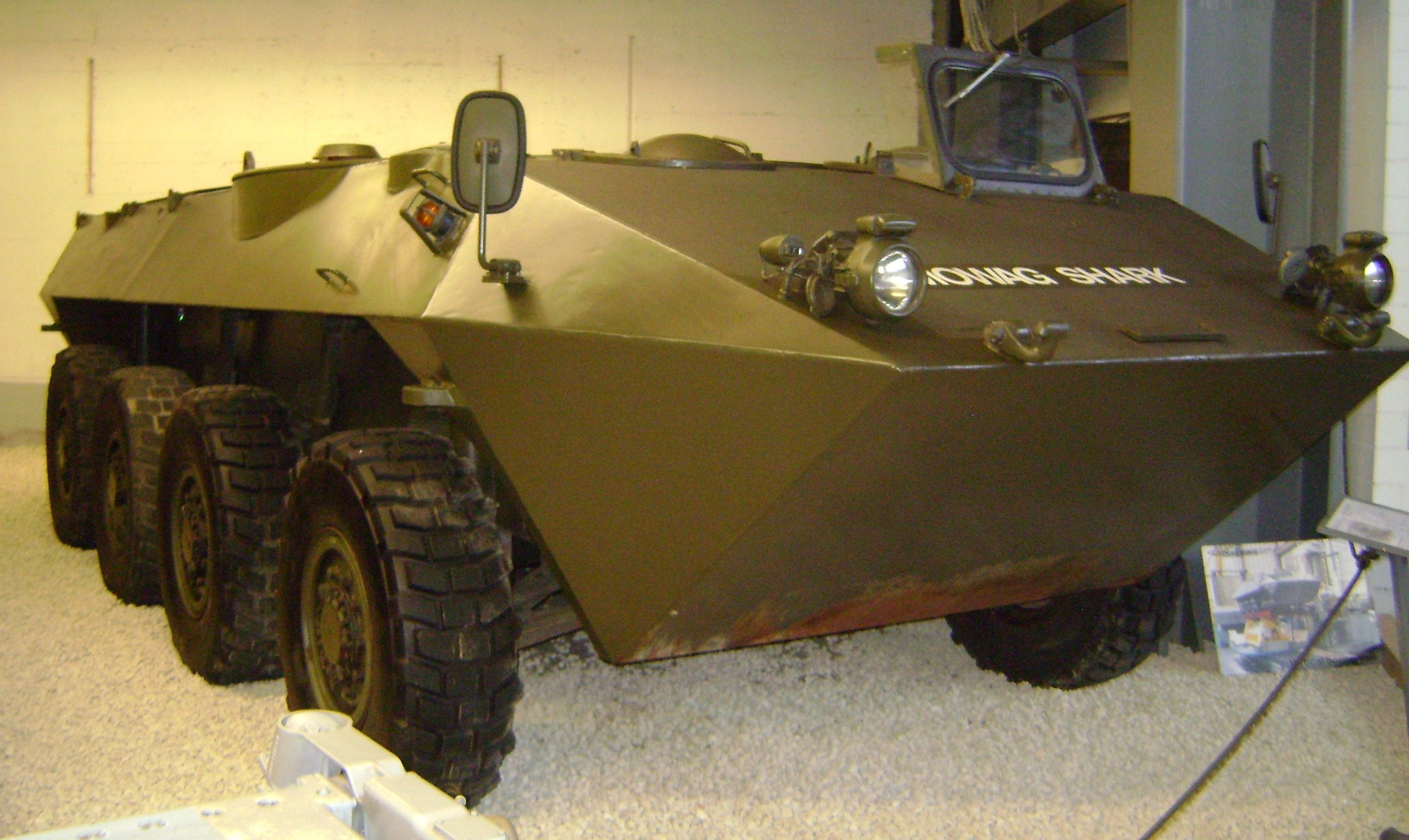
Mowag Shark

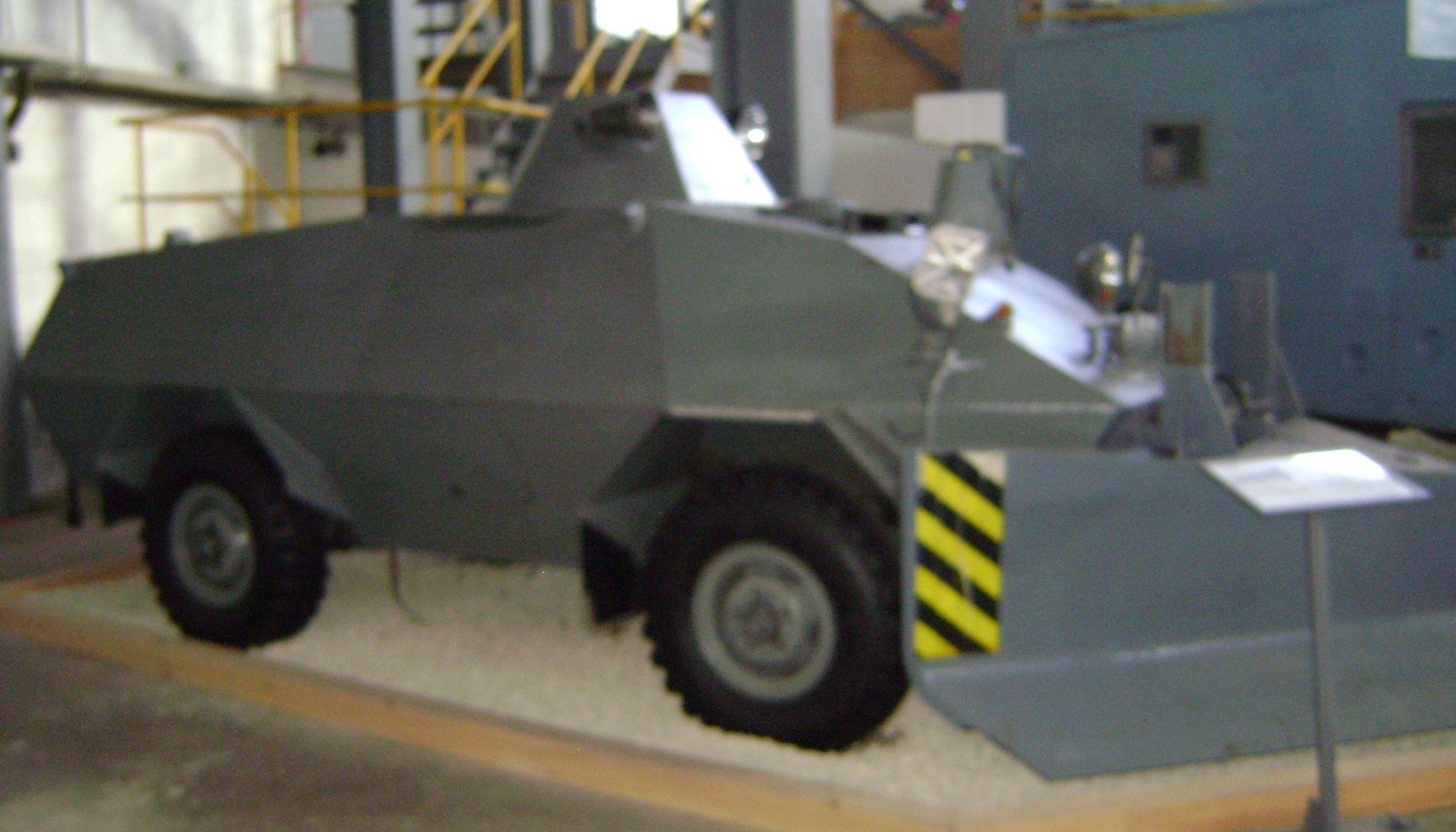
Mowag Police Roland

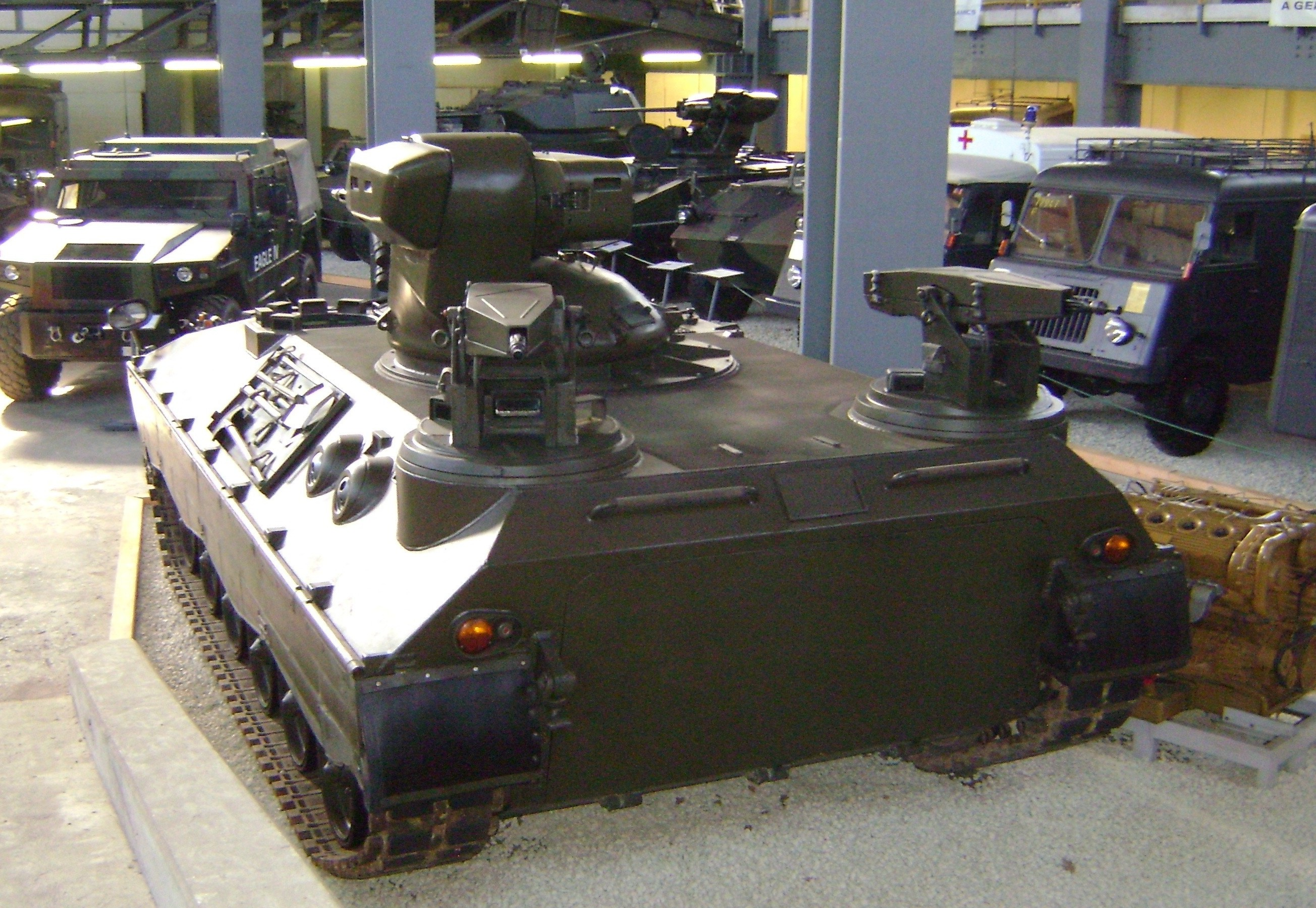
Mowag Tornado

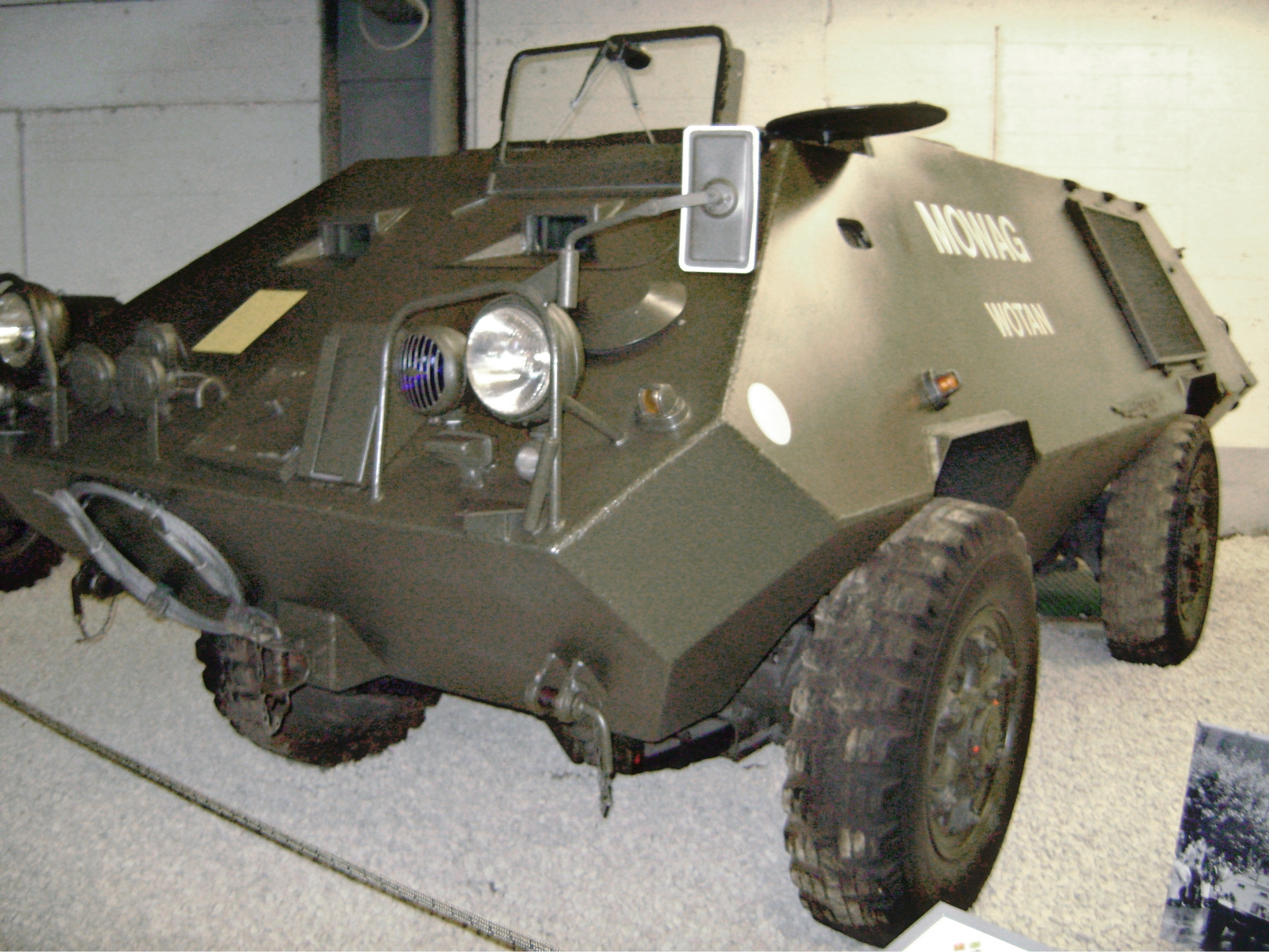
Mowag Wotan

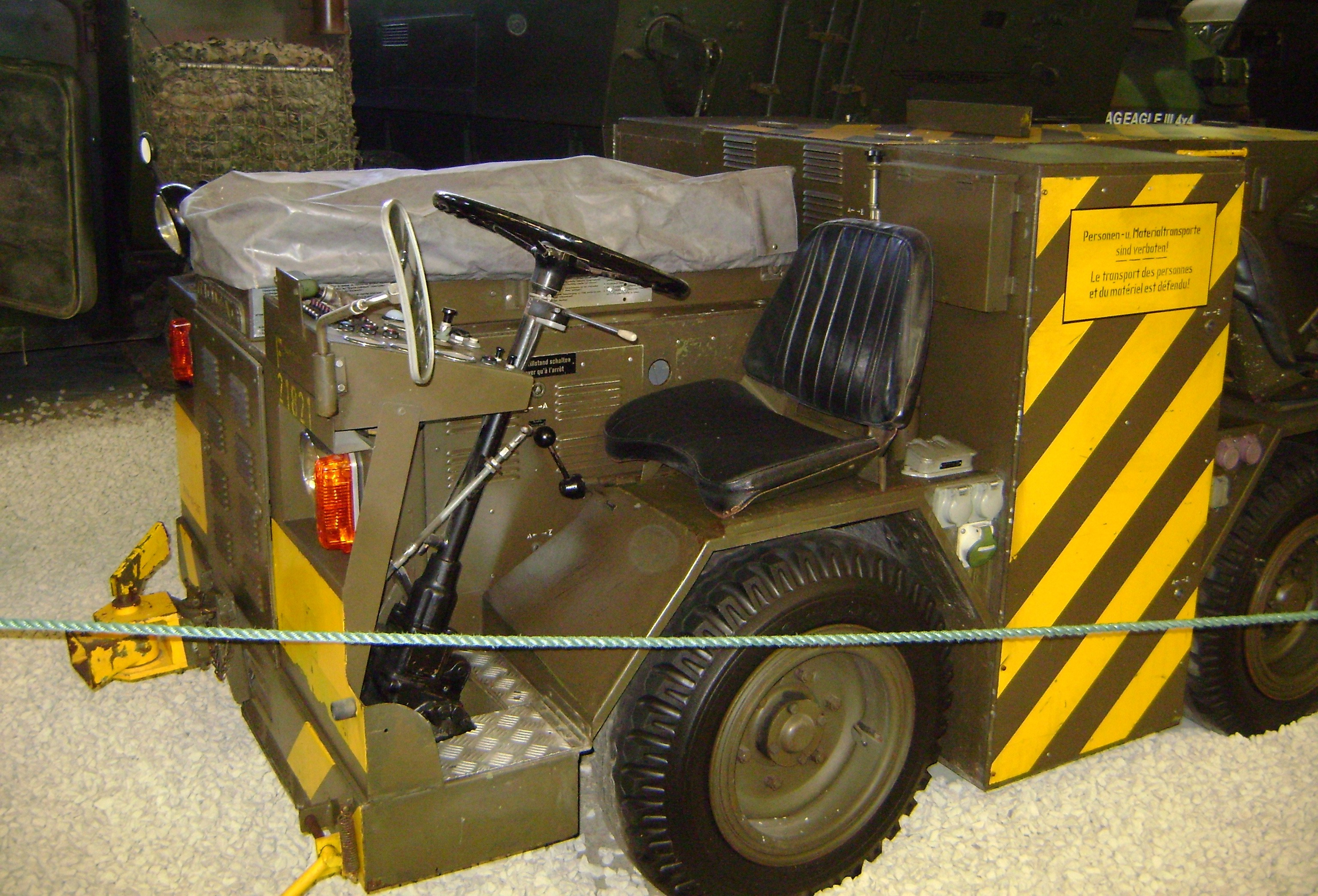
Mowag-AEG Aircraft tug for Mirage IIIS & Mirage IIIRS

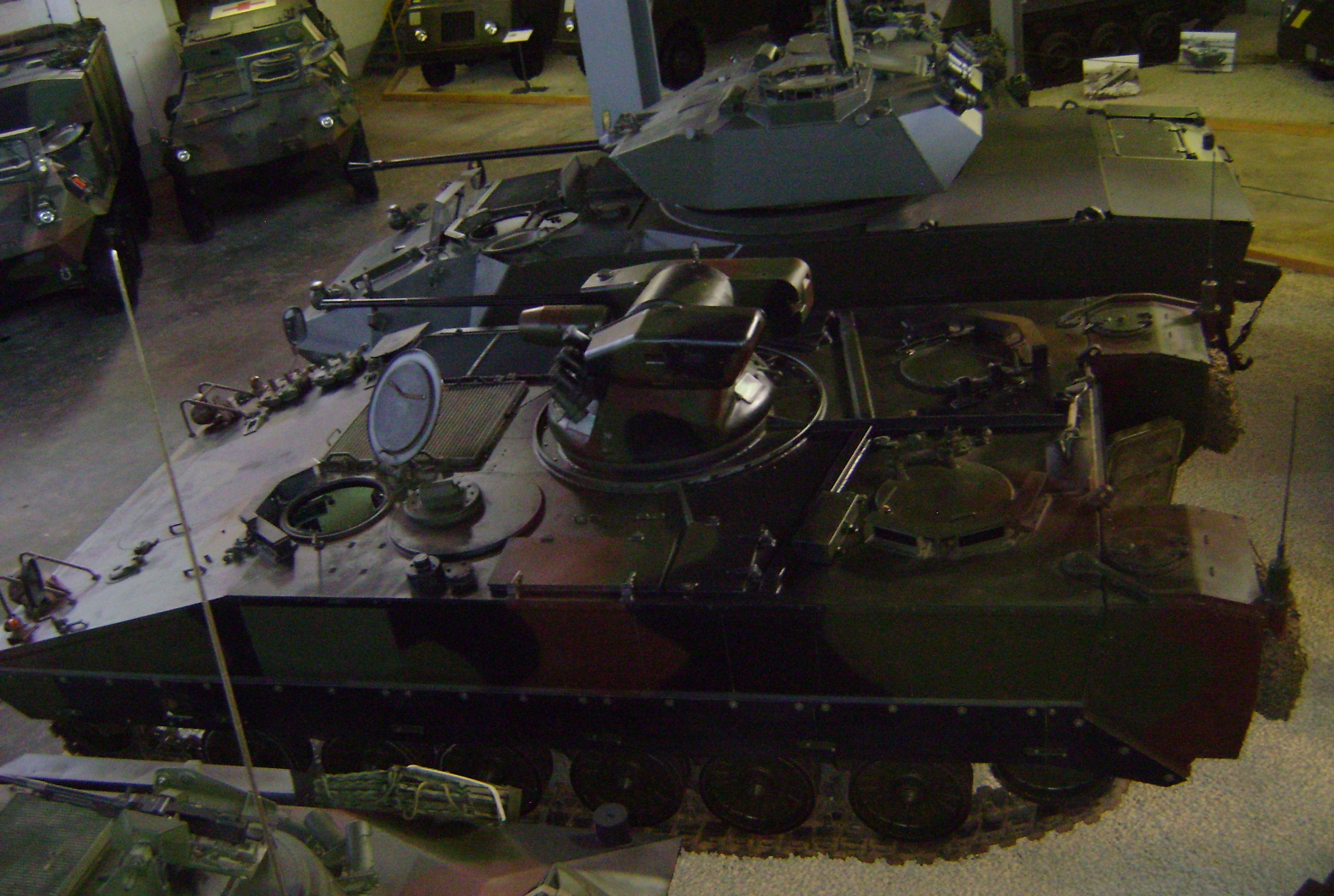
Mowag Trojan

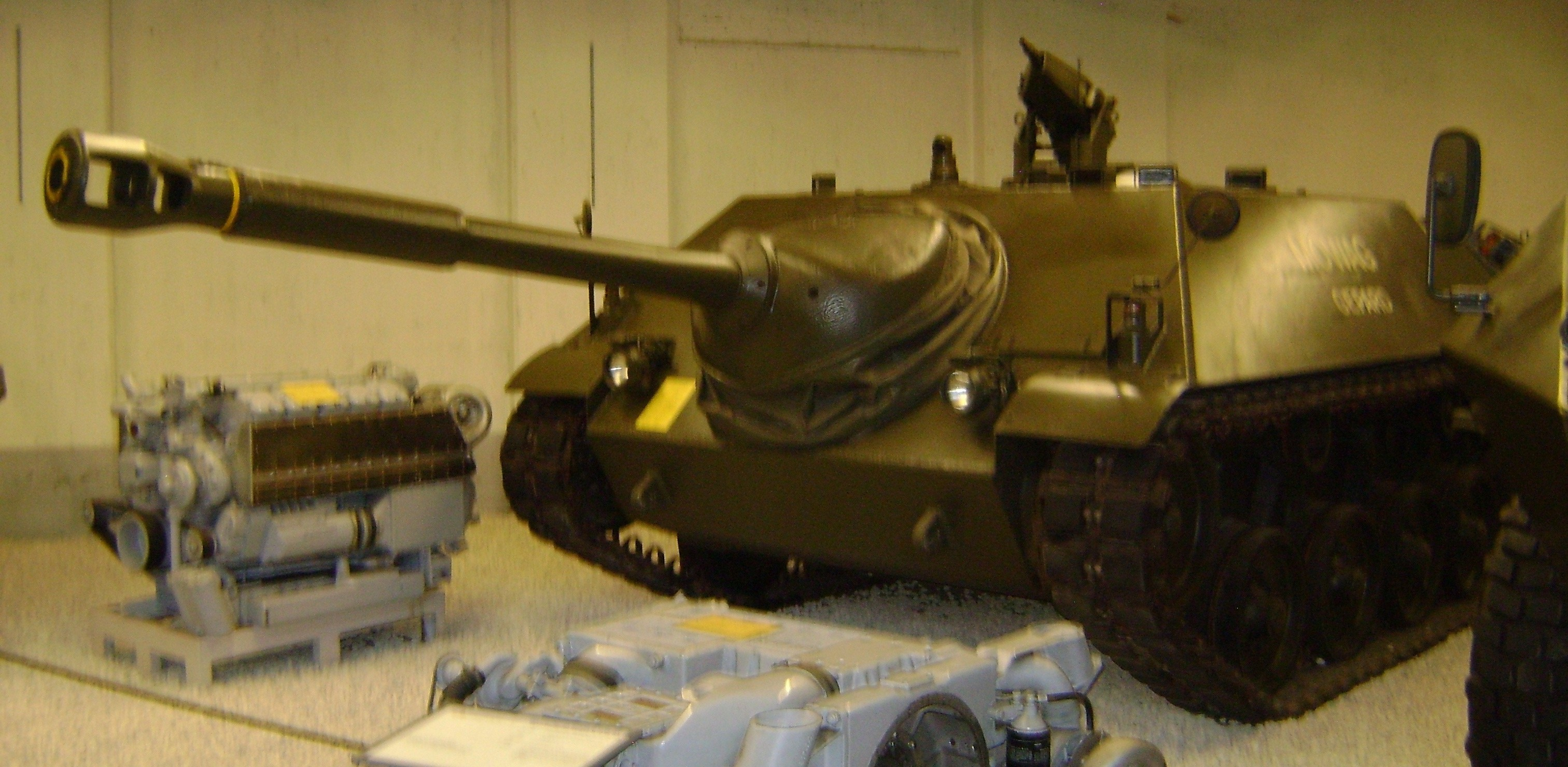
Mowag Gepard

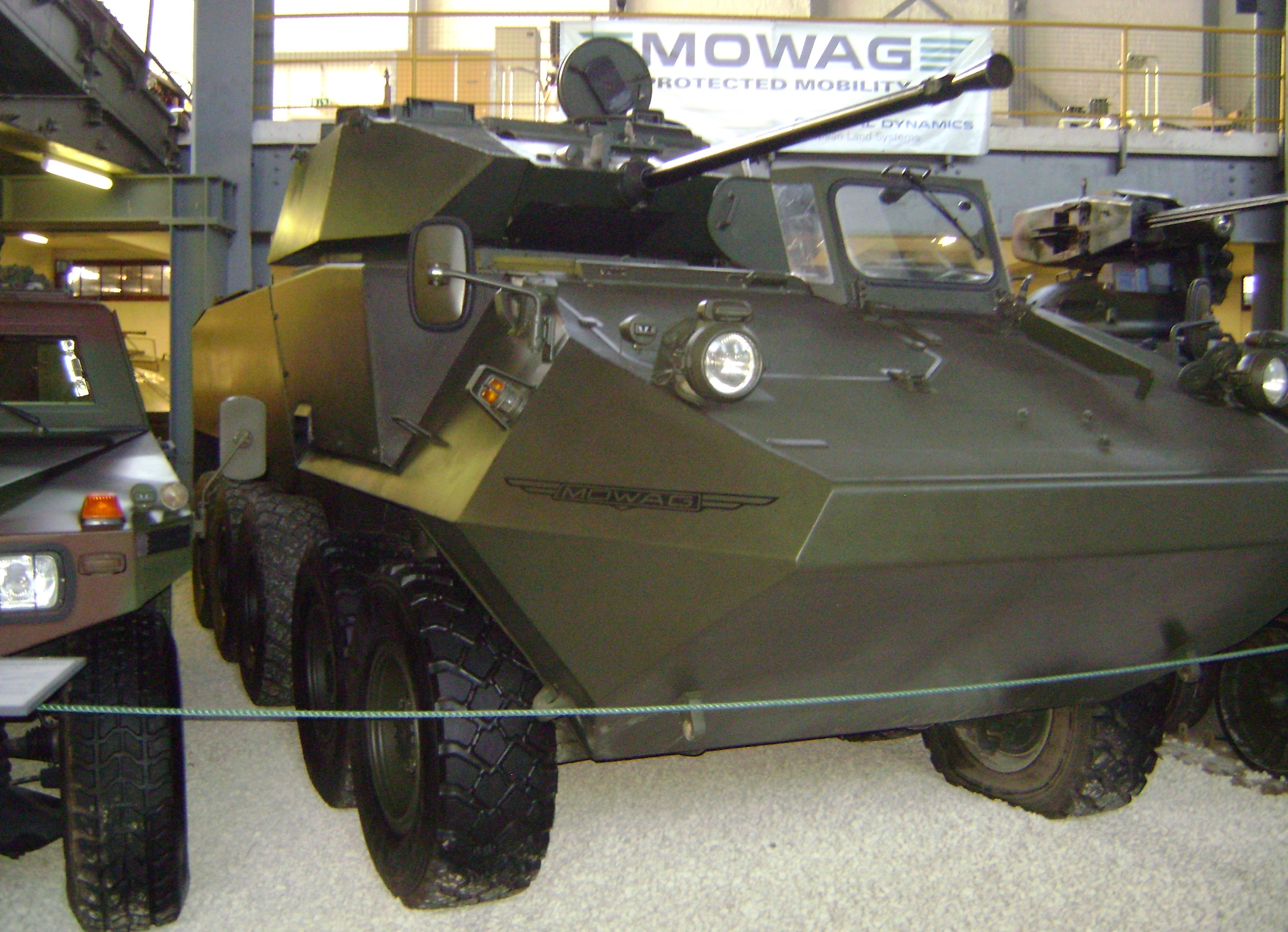
Mowag Piranha 10×10

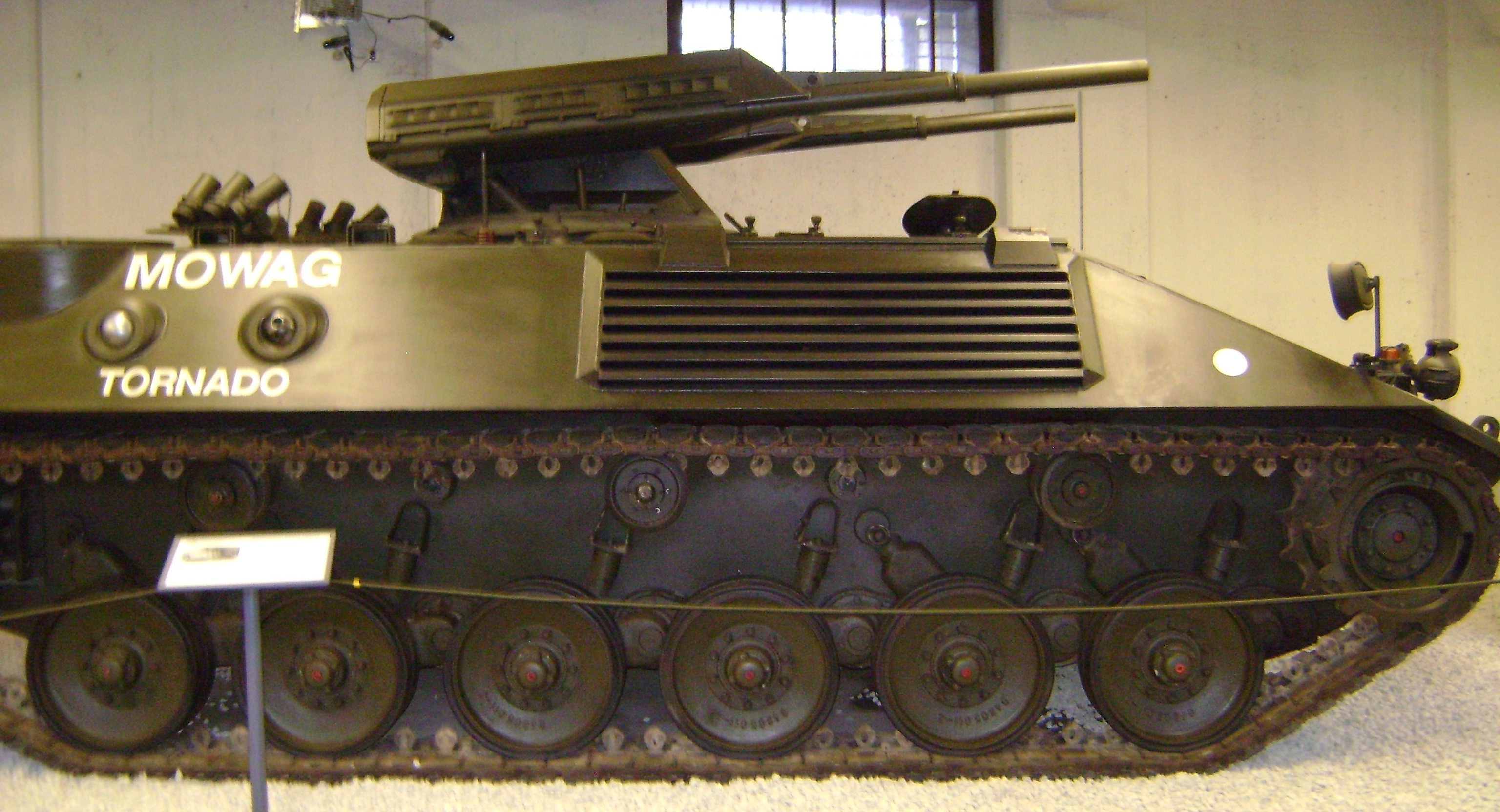
Mowag Tornado 2

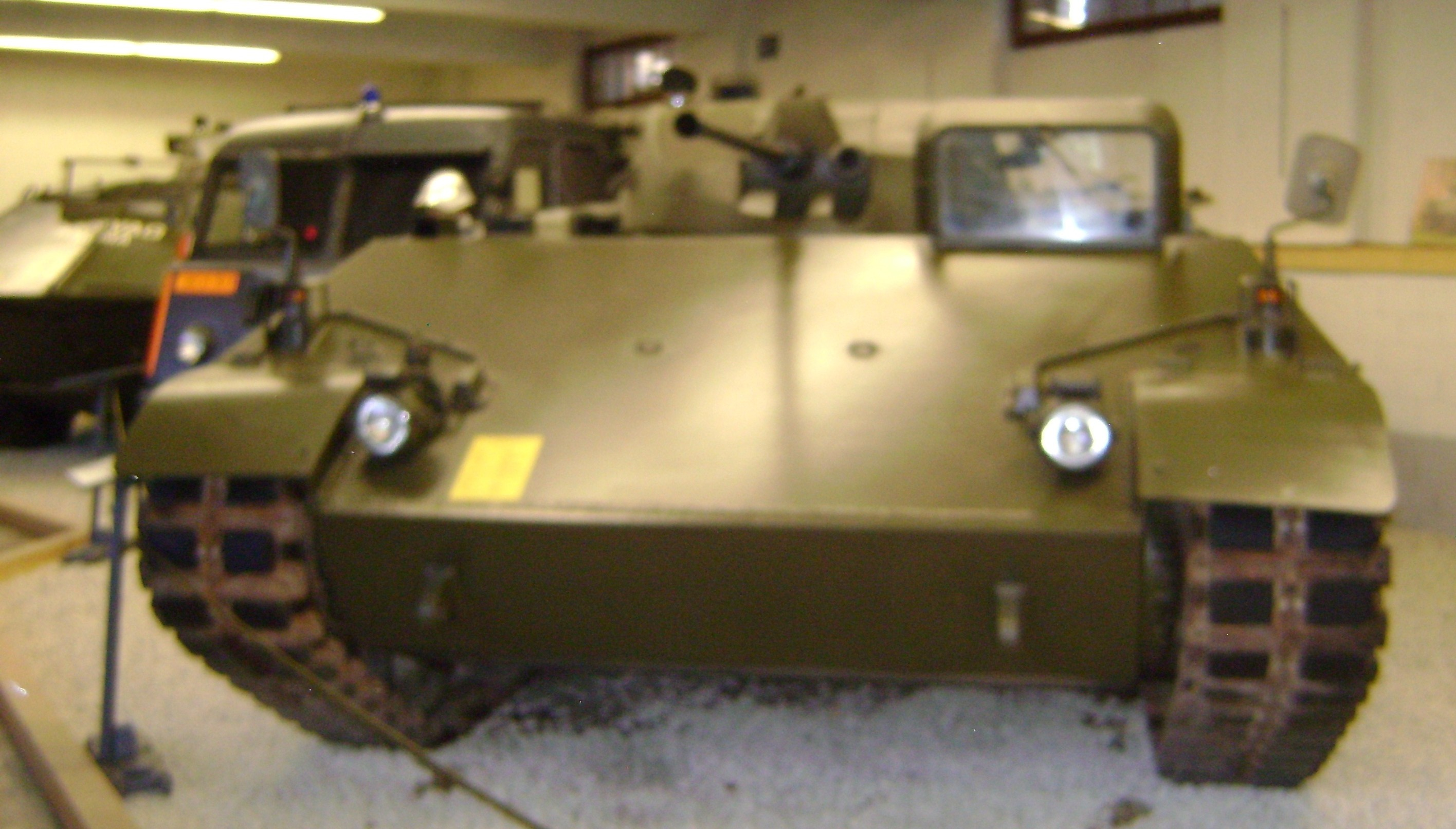
Mowag Taifun

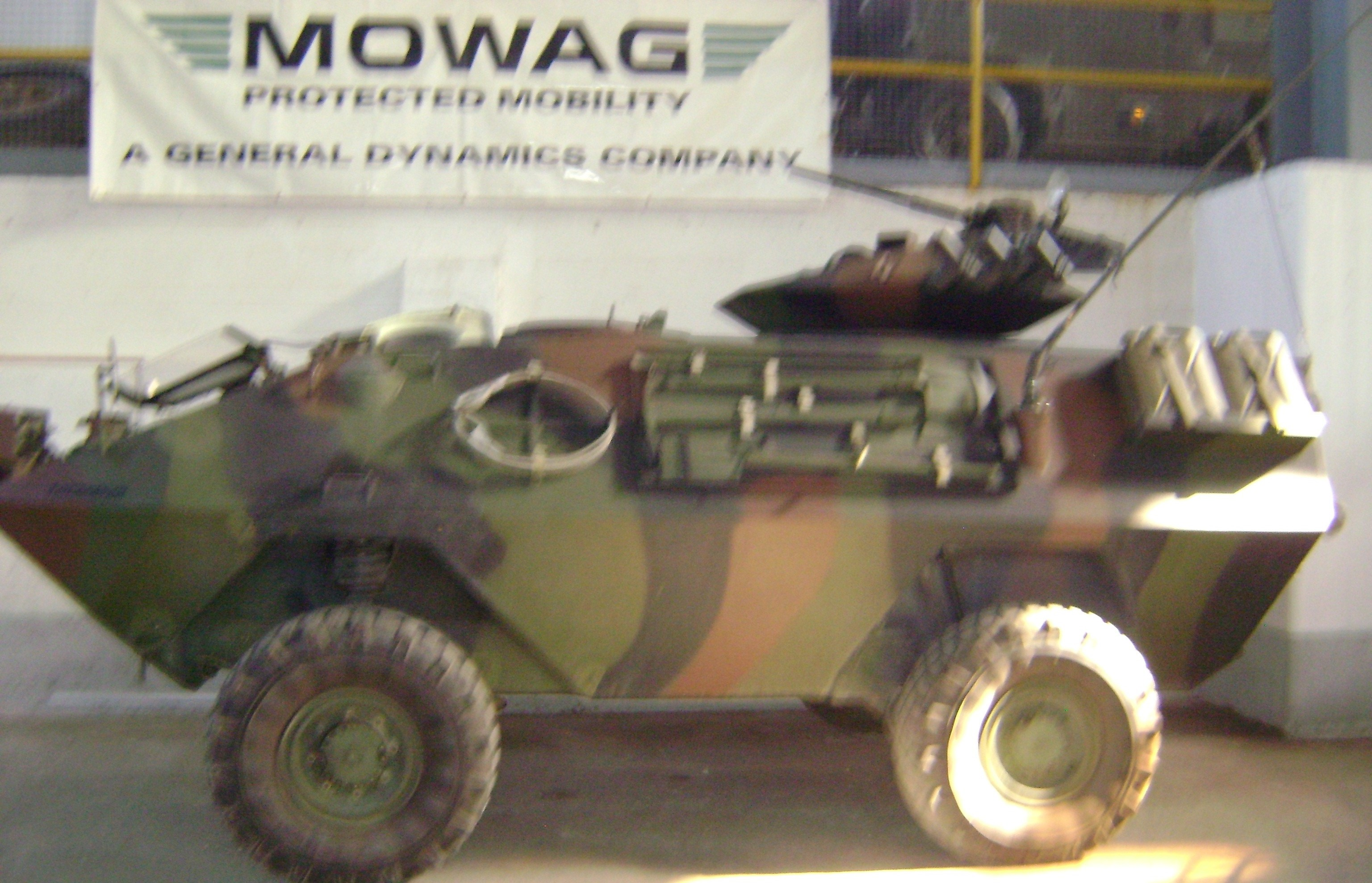
Mowag Piranha 4×4

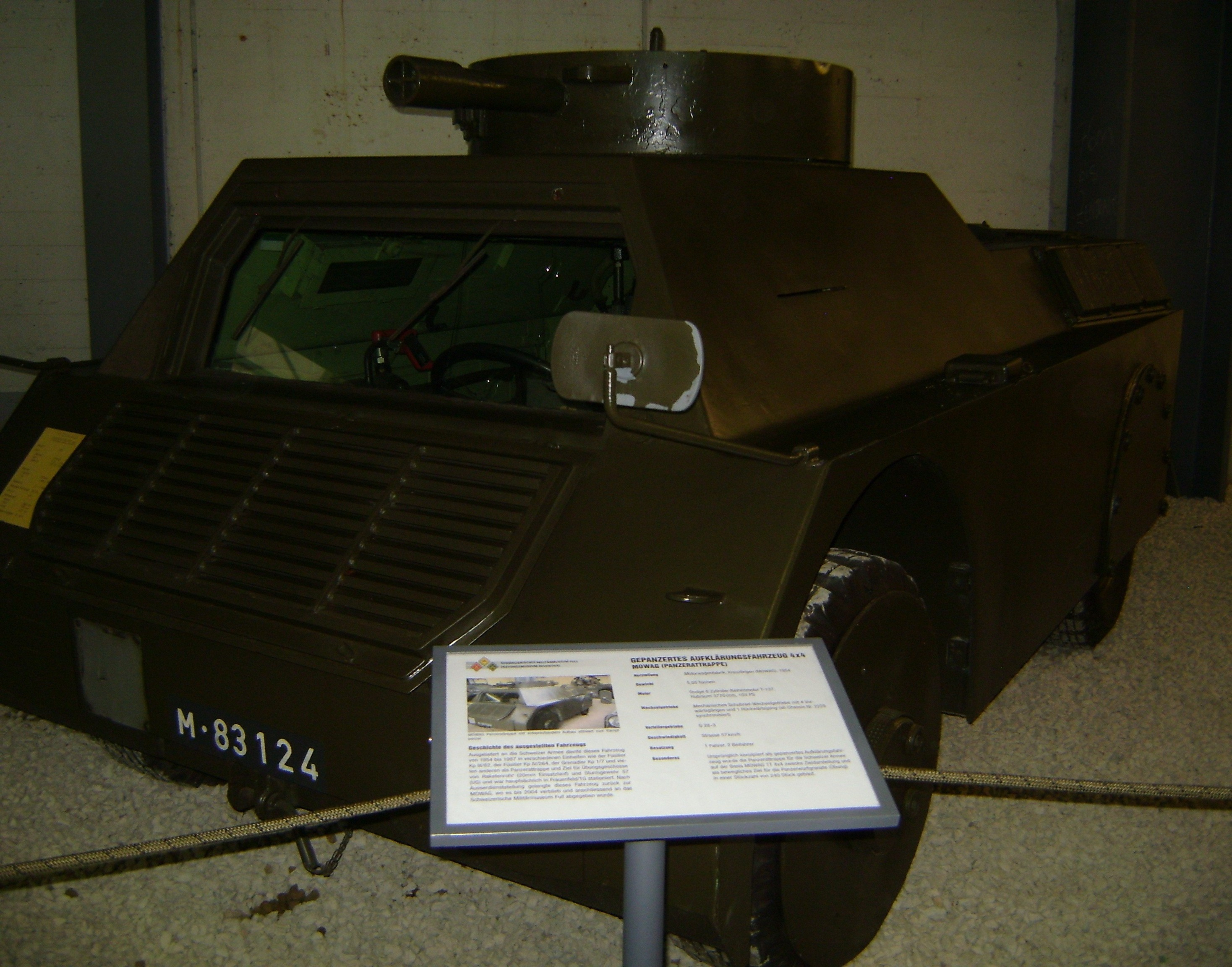
Mowag Panzerattrappe

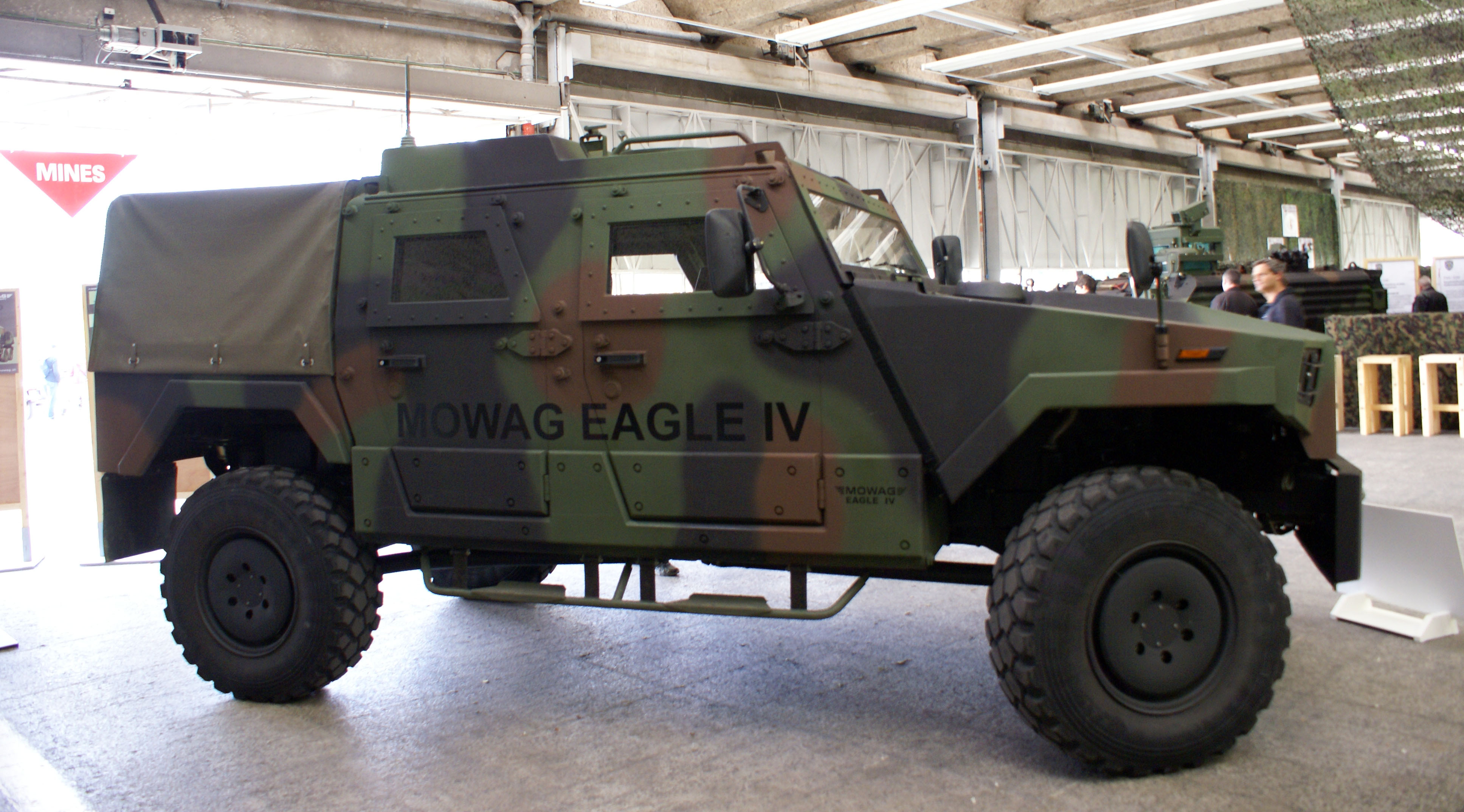
Mowag Eagle IV

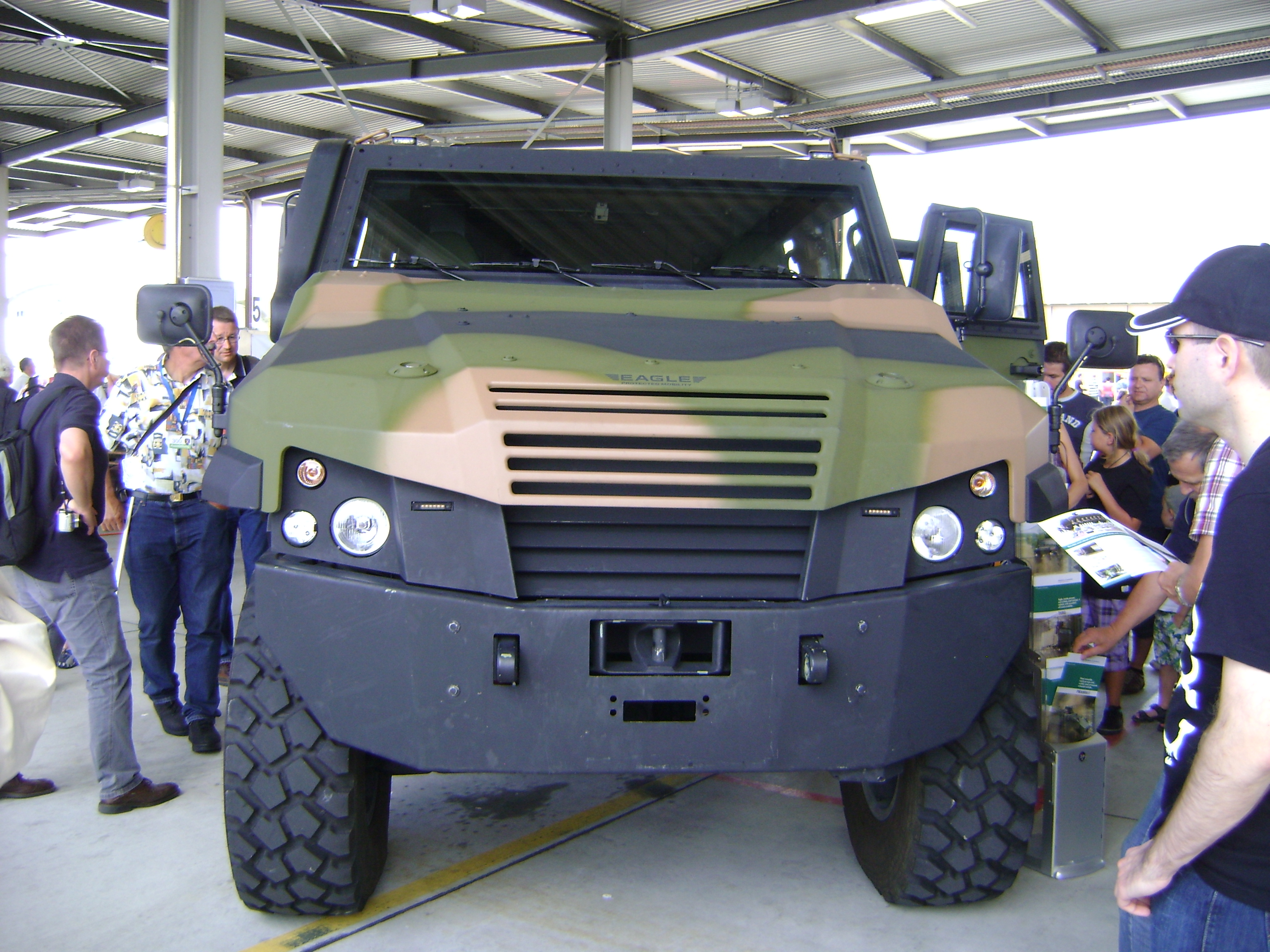
Mowag Eagle V - Australian prototype

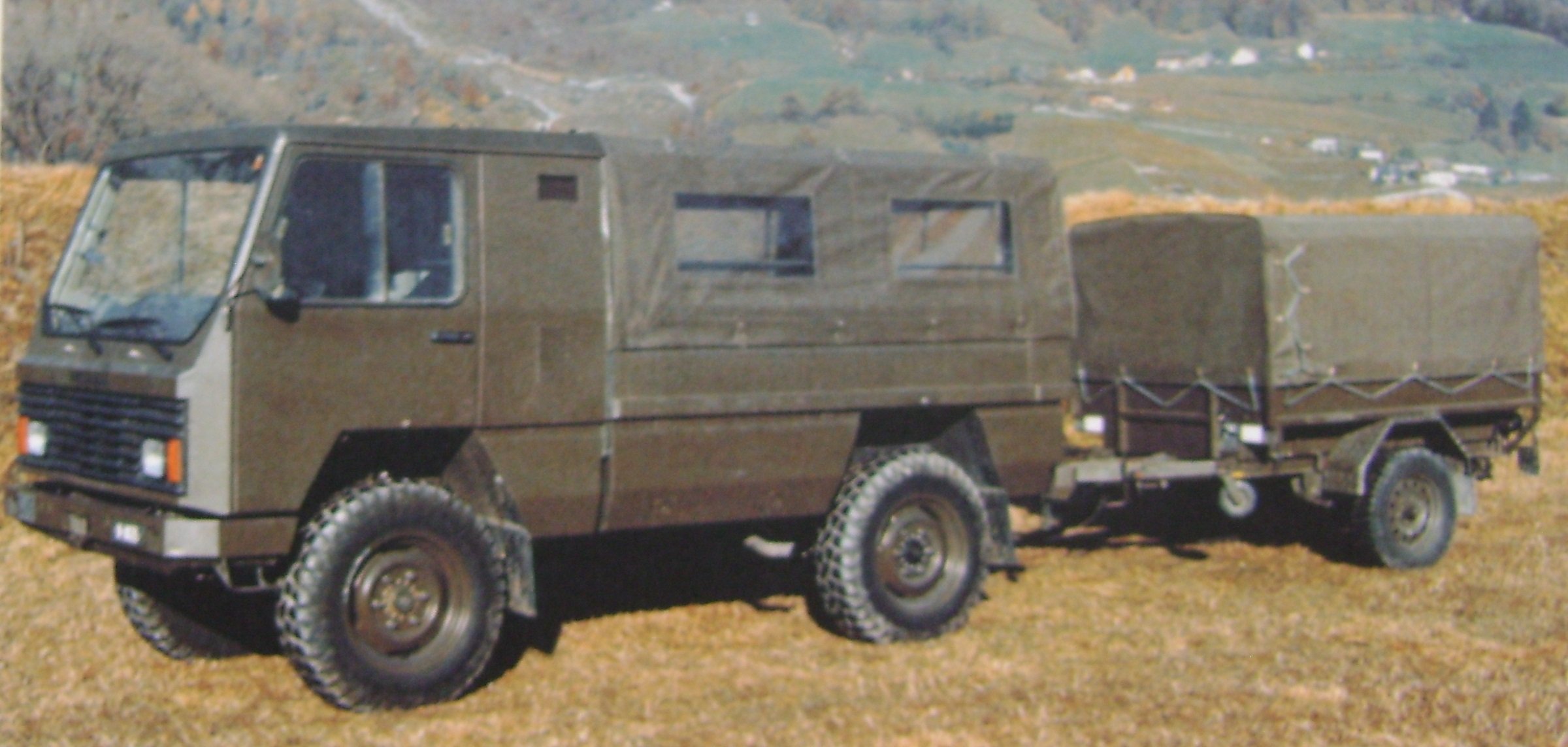
Mowag utility 4×4 – competitor of the DURO

== Bibliography ==
- Foss, Christopher F. (1987). Jane's Armour and Artillery 1987–88. London: Jane's Yearbooks. ISBN 0-7106-0849-7.
- Bauer, Marcus (1996). Nutzfahrzeuge der MOWAG Motorwagenfabrik AG. Goldach: Fachpresse Goldach, Hudson & Company. ISBN 9783857380563.
- Military Museum Full
- Ruedi Baumann: „Alles“ was Mowag schon bewegt hat - Auf Umwegen zum Welterfolg. SwissMoto. Bildpress Zuerich BPZ
