= Mowag Pirat =

MOWAG Pirat IFV
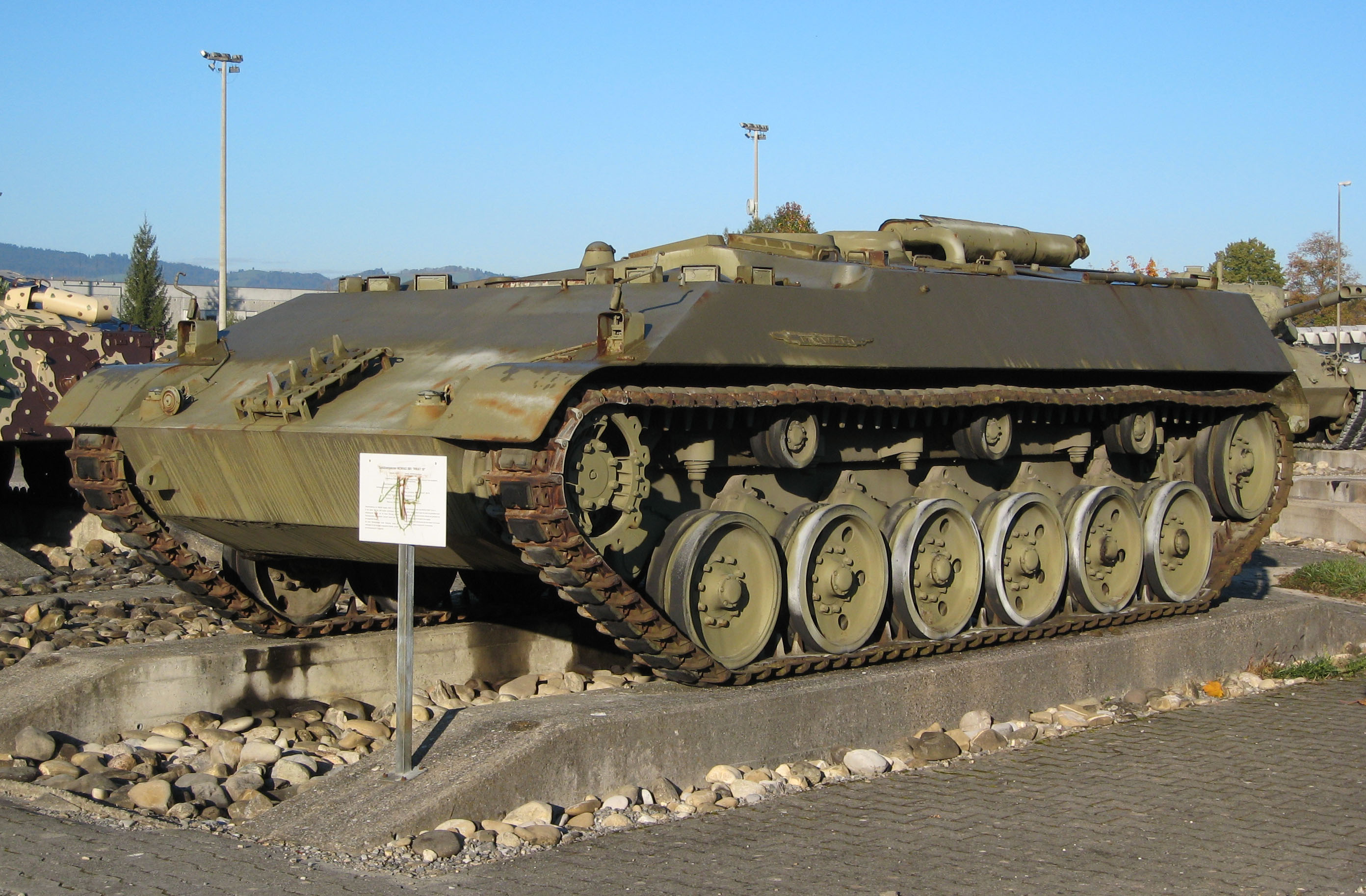
- MOWAG Pirat at Military Museum Thun
- Type: Infantry fighting vehicle / Armored Personnel Carrier
- Place of origin: Switzerland

Production history
- Manufacturer: MOWAG factory Kreuzlingen
- Produced: 1960 - 1975
- No. built: 11
- Variants: Military version, Police version

Specifications
- Mass: 18,000 kg (40,000 lb)
- Length: 6.10 m (240 in)
- Width: 2.90 m (114 in)
- Height: 1.80 m (71 in)
- Crew: 12: driver, commander, gunner and 9 grenadier troopers
- Main armament: 1x 20mm automatic cannon Oerlikon
- Secondary armament: 48mm rocket launcher.
- Engine: Ford 4 cylinder gasoline Displacement 8750 cm³ 225 kW
- Transmission: Manual gearbox 6 forward gears 1 reverse gears
- Operational range: 500 km (310 mi)
- Maximum speed: 70 km/h (43 mph)

The MOWAG Pirat is an armored Infantry tank made by the Swiss company MOWAG.

== History and development ==
Eleven prototypes in different versions were built from 1960 to 1975. Together with the Saurer Tartaruga the MOWAG Pirat was tested by the Swiss Army. Instead, the Army decided to buy the American M113, previously seen as an unsuitable contender. The MOWAG Pirat was the prototype of the later Mowag 3M1 Pirat.

One of these tanks is now in the Full Military museum and one in the tank museum in Thun.
