= Mowag 3M1 Pirat =

MOWAG IFV MOWAG 3M1
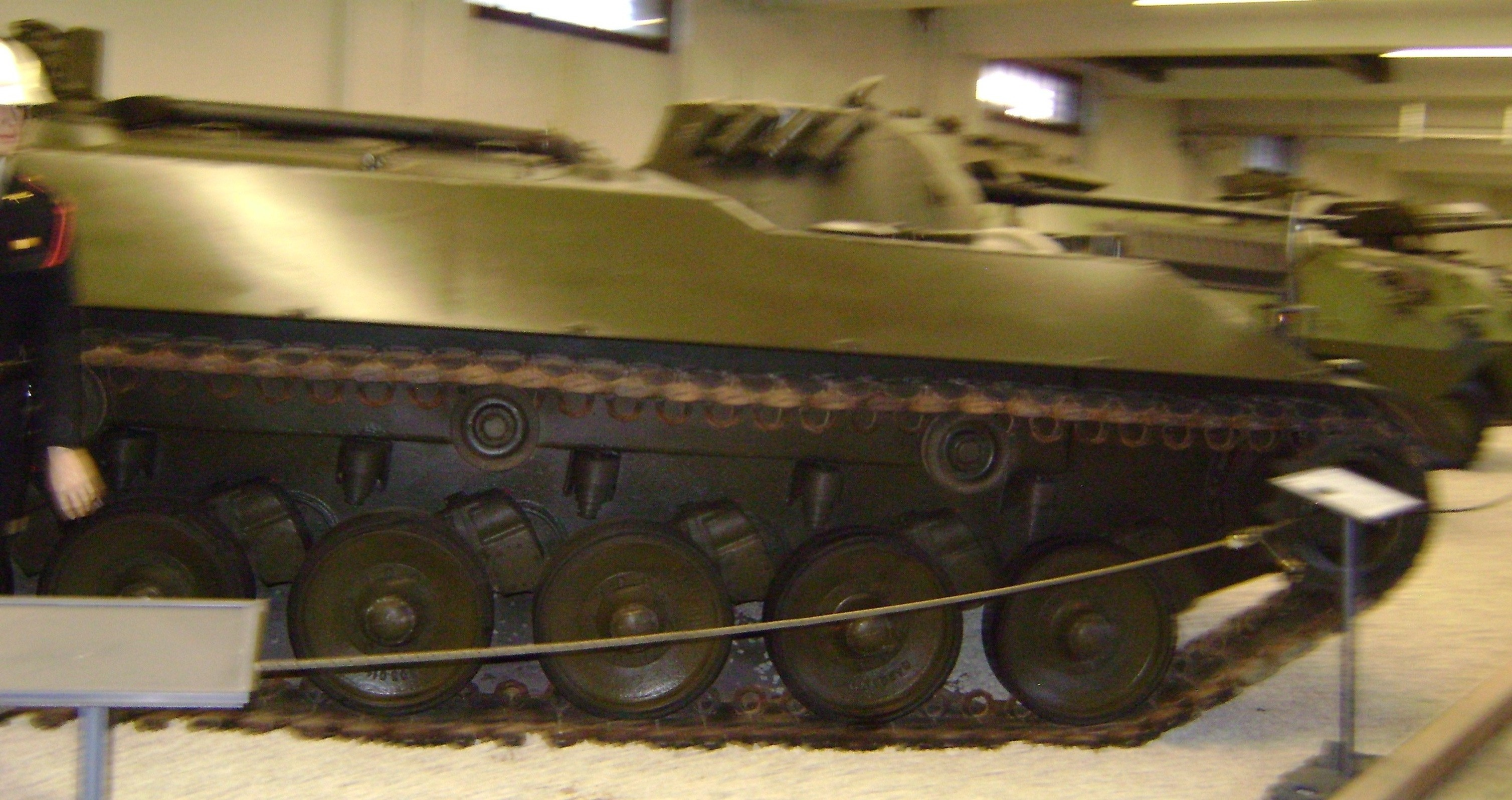
- MOWAG Pirat at Military Museum Thun
- Type: IFV APC
- Place of origin: Switzerland

Service history
- Used by: no one

Production history
- Manufacturer: MOWAGmotor car factory Kreuzlingen
- Produced: 1966
- No. built: 6
- Variants: Military version, Police Version

Specifications
- Mass: 24,800 kg (54,700 lb)
- Length: 6.10 m (240 in)
- Width: 2.90 m (114 in)
- Height: 1.80 m (71 in)
- Crew: 11: driver, commander, gunner +8 armored infantry
- Main armament: 1x 20mm automatic cannon Hispano Suiza 820, Coaxial 7.62 MG mmm 3
- Secondary armament: 7.62 MG 3 in MOWAG apex mount 6x 76mm rocket launcher
- Engine: MOWAG V10 engine, 2M10DV, displacement 13,500ccm ³ 315 kW
- Transmission: Mechanical transmission speed transmission MOWAG M130-6 S, 6 forward gears 2 reverse gears
- Operational range: 500 km (310 mi)
- Maximum speed: 70 km/h (43 mph)

The armored MOWAG 3M1 Pirat was a prototype for an armored personnel carrier developed by the Swiss company Mowag.

== History and development ==
Initiated by the development project of the future German Marder infantry fighting vehicle, which was evaluated and tested in the various test series, Mowag developed the 3M1 Model 1 - 6 infantry fighting vehicle in 1966, which was based on the Mowag Pirat 18.

The 3M1 was not procured. However, the development resulted in the Mowag gun carriage, 2000 of which were manufactured in Kreuzlingen for the Marder series, and the ball screens (gas-tight spherical firing flaps) used on the Marder, 8000 of which were supplied.

A special feature was the arrangement of the drive unit in the engine compartment, which was located in the center of the vehicle. Another innovation was the complete production of all drive components such as the engine, transmission, side-feed and cooling system at Mowag.

The 3M1 is now on exhibit in the Military Museum Full.
