= Mowag T1 4×4 =

MOWAG T1 4×4
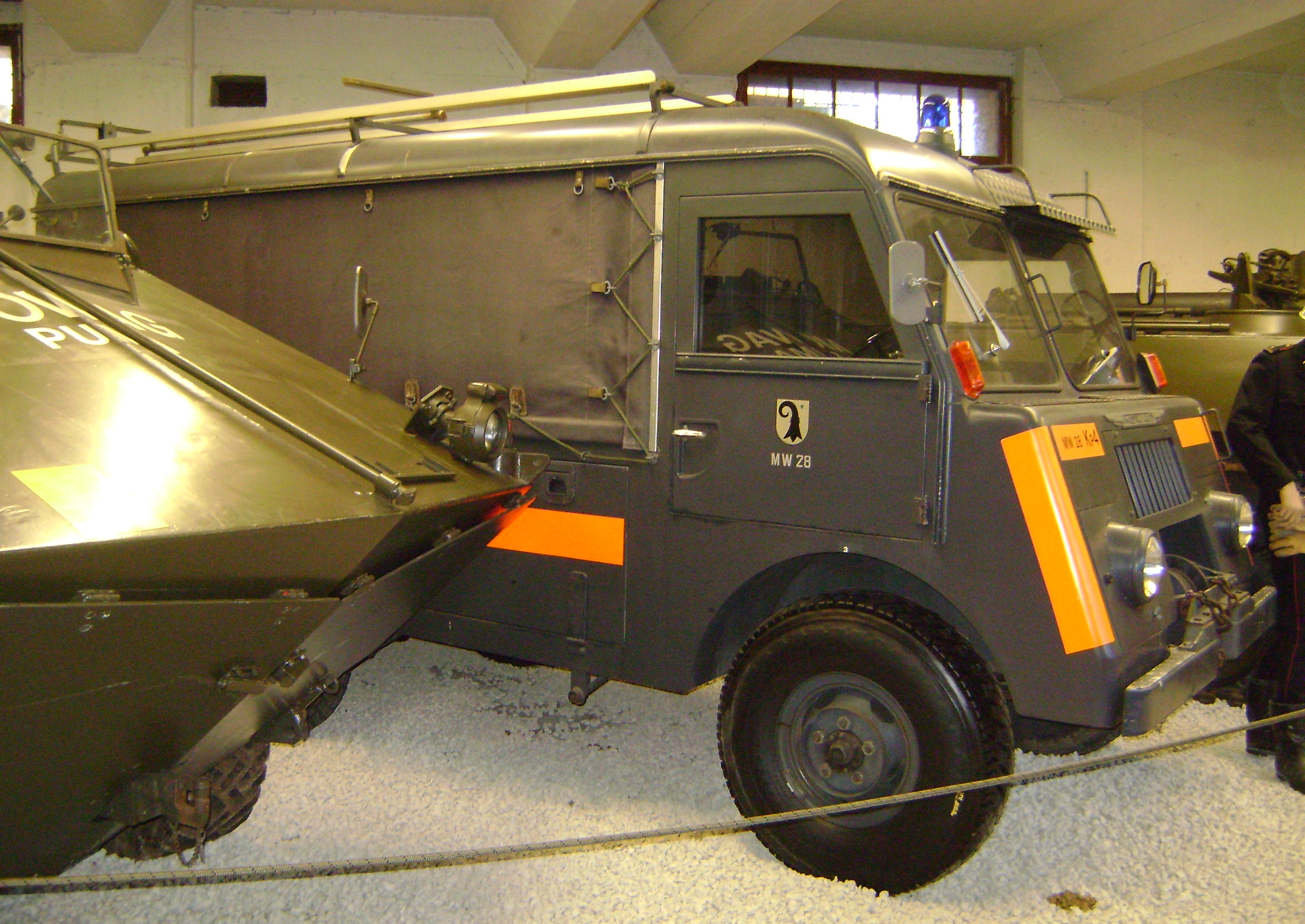
- MOWAG T1 4×4 Kantonspolizei Basel Stadt
- Place of origin: Switzerland

Service history
- Used by: Switzerland

Production history
- Manufacturer: MOWAG
- Produced: 1953–1995
- No. built: >1,600
- Variants: 7 – military version, police version, firefighter version, ambulance version

Specifications
- Mass: 3,500 kg (7,700 lb)
- Crew: 1 driver + 9 personnel
- Engine: Dodge 6 cylinder inline engine T-137, 3770 cm 103 hp
- Transmission: Mechanical pushing wheel-change transmission 4 forward gears 1 reverse
- Suspension: 4×4 wheeled
- Maximum speed: 77 km/h (48 mph),39 km/h (24 mph) off road

The Mowag T1 4×4 is a Swiss military vehicle. The supply of 1,600 to the Swiss Army was an early success for the Mowag company.

== History ==
The 1953 MOWAG T1 4×4 was modular. It was built in multiple configurations: with an open loading ramp, with radio as a closed van, etc. In order to keep manufacturing, maintenance and repair simple and inexpensive, many U.S. Dodge parts are used, especially from the WC series. The Mowag T1 came with or without a winch. Most MOWAG T1 4×4 were built as right-hand drive vehicles. Over 1600 were delivered in 7 different versions to the Swiss Army. MOWAG T1 4×4s were also supplied as emergency vehicles to fire and police departments.

The Army used the MOWAG T1 4×4 until 1995. Many vehicles moved into private hands. Three vehicles are now in the Swiss Military Museum Full. An ambulance version is in the de:Zuger Depot Technikgeschichte.
