= Vae =

Vae or VAE may refer to:

- Vae (name)
- VAE Nortrak North America, a manufacturer of railroad track components
- Validation des Acquis de l'Expérience, a procedure of granting degrees based on work experience in France
- Variational autoencoder, an artificial neural network architecture
- VAE (vehicle), an armored personnel carrier project from Argentina
