= VAPE =

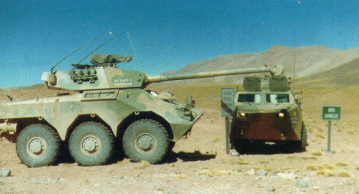
- VAPE-1 (Renault prototype)
- Type: Amphibious Reconnaissance Vehicle
- Place of origin: Argentina

Production history
- Designed: 1979
- Manufacturer: Renault; Panhard
- No. built: 2

Specifications
- Mass: 15.535 t
- Length: 6.00 m 8.25 m gun forward
- Width: 2.50 m
- Height: 2.83 m
- Crew: 3
- Armor: Rolled steel
- Main armament: 90 mm GIAT F4
- Secondary armament: 2 × 7.62mm
- Engine: Diesel; 254 hp
- Suspension: 4 × 4 (VAE-2); 6 × 6 (VAE-1)
- Operational range: 1000 km
- Maximum speed: 100 km/h

The Vehículo Anfibio Pesado de Exploración (VAPE, "Heavy Amphibious Exploration Vehicle") was a wheeled amphibious reconnaissance vehicle project developed by Argentina in the 1970s. Commissioned by the Argentine Army, two prototypes were developed by the French companies Renault and Panhard. On top of reconnaissance, the vehicle was also designed for direct infantry support and anti-tank warfare.

== History ==
The production of armored vehicles in Argentina ceased after the production of 16 Nahuel tanks in 1940. In 1960, Plan Europa was formulated, planning for the development of armored vehicles production in Argentina. In 1968, under license from French firms, AMX-13 light tanks were manufactured at the Astarsa shipyard. By the 1970s, Argentina had become the second largest arms producer in Latin America (after Brazil), producing equipment such as ships, military aircraft and rifles, and the government was attempting to produce its own armored vehicles. In 1974, the West German firm Thyssen-Henschel received a contract for the development of the medium tank TAM and the infantry fighting vehicle TAM VCTP. In January 1979, the state-owned company TAMSE ordered the French companies Renault and Panhard to build prototypes of a reconnaissance vehicle for the Argentine Army. The vehicle, called VAPE, was to be exported. The APV VAE was also developed concurrently by the two companies.

At the time, Argentina did not have a developed road network and required fast, lightweight military equipment. The VAE/VAPE, along with the TAM/VCTP and the plane DINFIA IA 38, was developed with this in mind.

The contract called for the construction of 1000 units, to be assembled at the factory of TENSA in Córdoba. From 1979 to 1980, Renault and Panhard presented their 6×6 prototypes, which were transferred to the Institute of Scientific and Technical Research for Defense for testing. While the tests were successful, the military dictatorship of the National Reorganization Process was then involved in the Dirty War, and financial difficulties caused the discontinuation of the project.

== Design and specifications ==
VAPE has a frontal control compartment and a fighting compartment in the middle of the vehicle. The body of the BRM is sealed, made of bulletproof and splinter-proof steel armor. The regular crew consists of three personnel: the vehicle commander, the driver and the gunner. The turret is located behind the engine compartment, in the center of the hull. The vehicle is equipped with NBC protection, air conditioning and fire extinguishers. The VAPE is equipped with a 90mm GIAT F4 cannon located in the Argentinean SAMM-TAMSE-TENSA AR90 turret, with an ammunition stock of 20 rounds. The initial velocity of the shell is 1500 m/s. In addition, the vehicle has two 7.62mm machine guns with 1,000 rounds and smoke grenade launchers located on both sides of the turret.

== Variants ==
- VAPE-1 (6 × 6) – Renault armored vehicle variant.
- VAPE-2 (6 × 6) – Panhard armored vehicle variant.

== Bibliography ==
- Piñeiro, Luis F. (August 2006). "VAE-VAPE". Ares World Defense Security (in Spanish). No. 3. Buenos Aires. ISSN 1669-7332.
