= Tanks of South Korea =

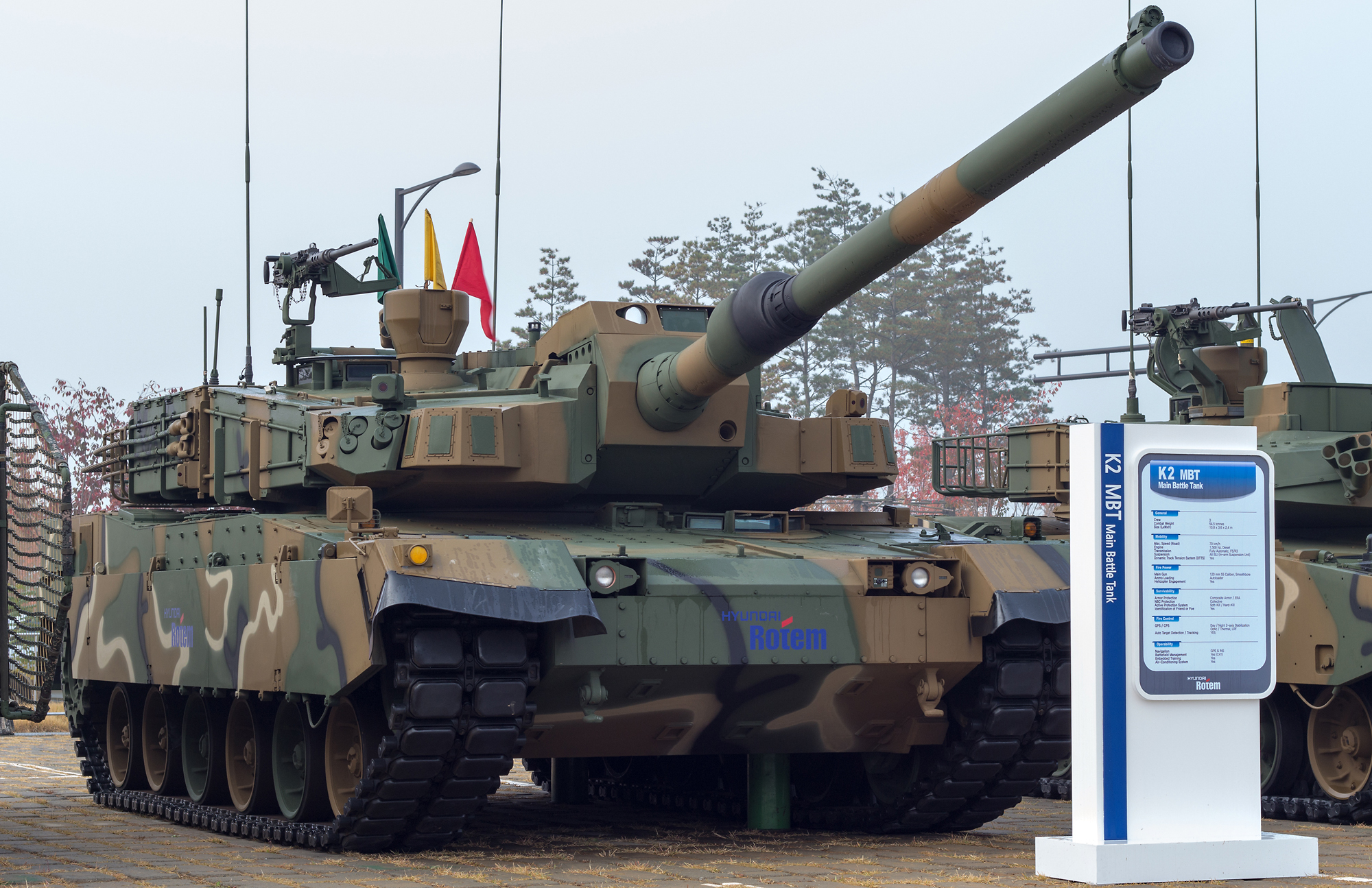
A K2 Black Panther of the South Korean army.

The history and development of the tank in the South Korea spans the period from their adoption after World War II with the foundation of the South Korean army, into the Cold War and the present. Over this period Korea has moved from being an operator of United States designed and produced tanks to being the designer and manufacturer of tanks in its own right.

== Overview ==
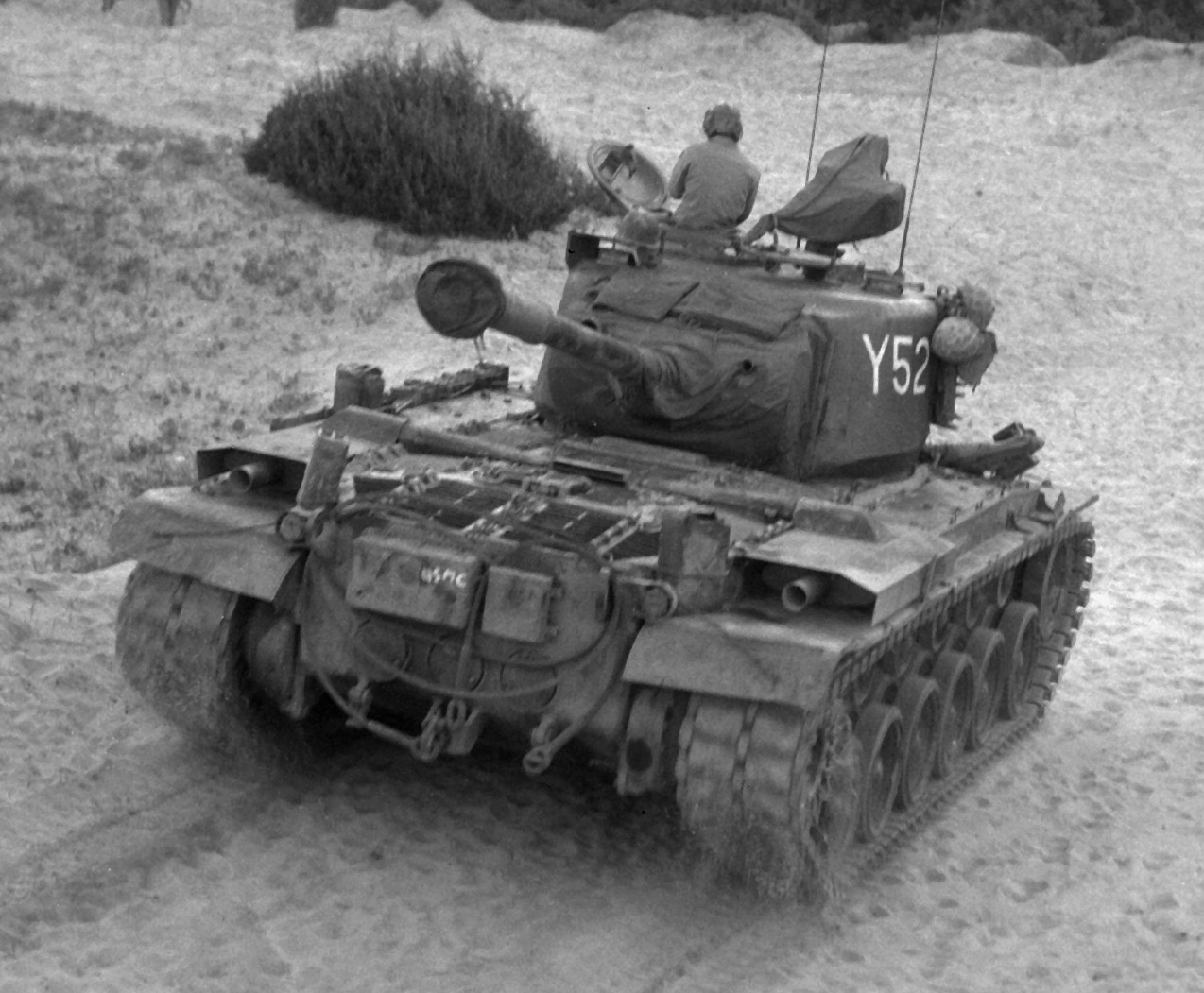
USMC M46 Patton, 8 July 1952. Note the different rear plate and twin fender-mounted exhausts.

=== History of the South Korean army ===
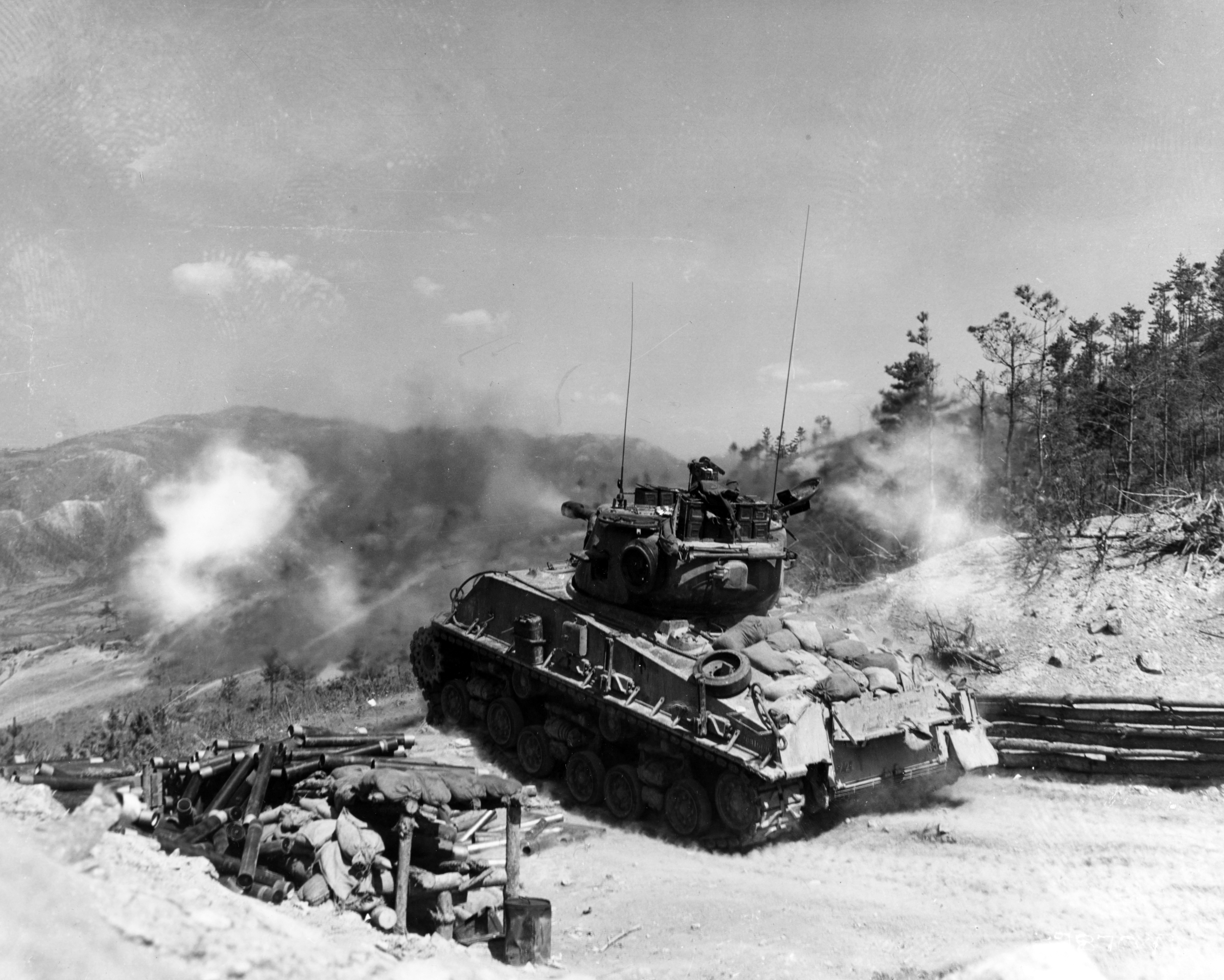
Supporting the 8th ROK Army Division, an M4A3E8 Sherman tank fires its 76mm gun at KPA bunkers at "Napalm Ridge", Korea, 11 May 1952.

Despite the initial plan of a unified Korea in the 1943 Cairo Declaration, escalating Cold War antagonism between the Soviet Union and the United States eventually led to the establishment of separate governments, each with its own ideology, leading to Korea's division into two political entities in 1948: North Korea and South Korea. In the North, a former anti-Japanese guerrilla and communist activist, Kim Il Sung gained power through Soviet support. In the South, elections supervised by the United Nations were held, a Republic of Korea was declared, and Syngman Rhee inaugurated as its first president. In December, the UN General Assembly declared this "a lawful government" and "the only such government in Korea."

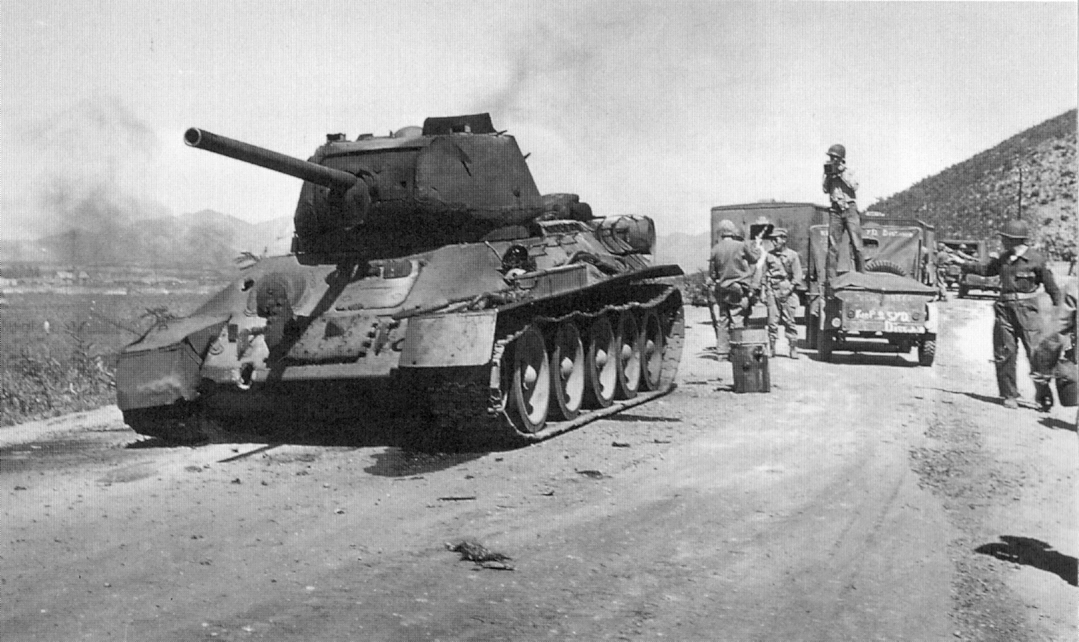
Knocked out North Korean T-34 during the Korean War in September 1950 near Seoul after the amphibious landings at Inchon.

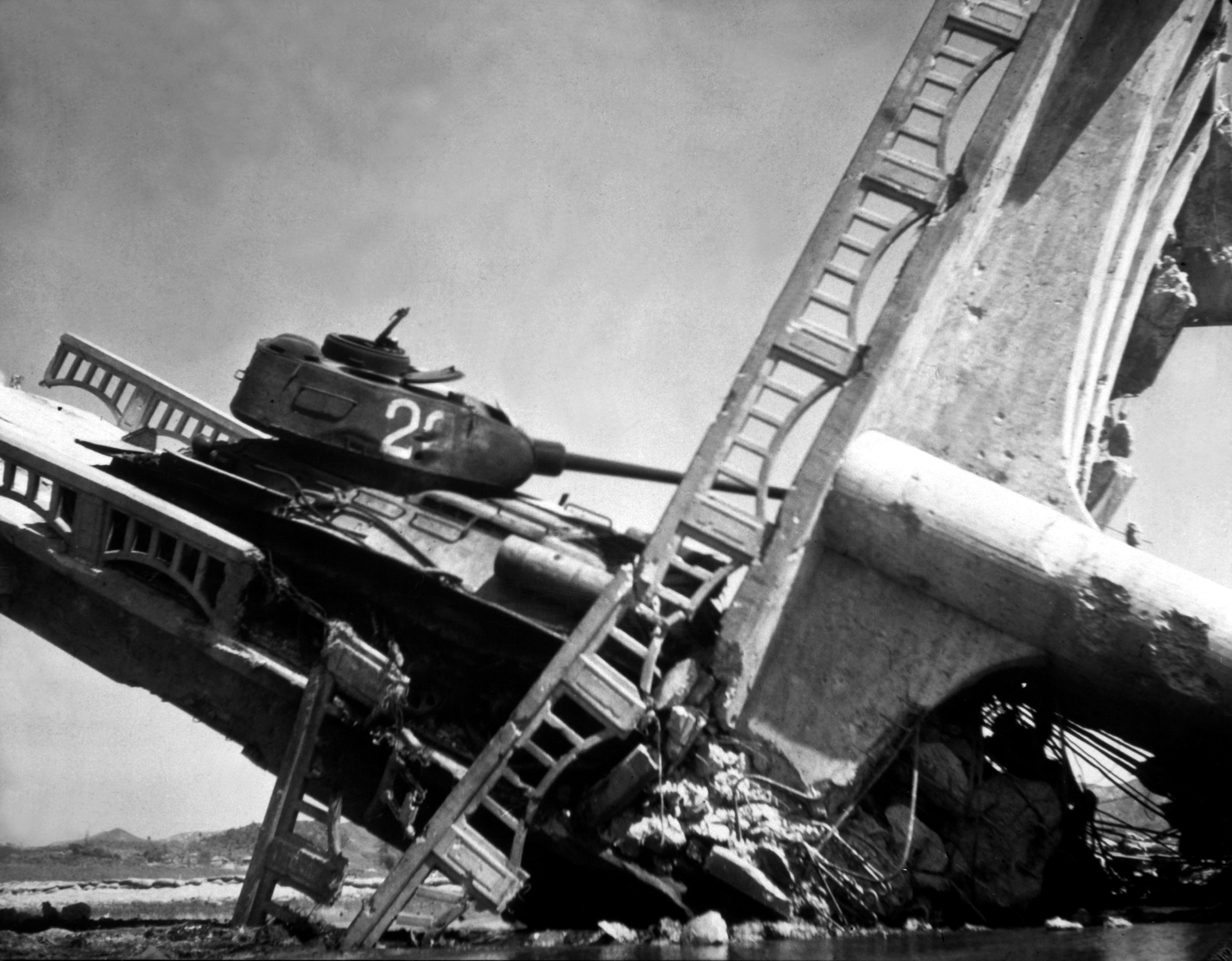
A North Korean T-34-85 caught on a bridge south of Suwon by American attack aircraft during the Korean War.

The United States engaged in the decolonization of Korea (mainly in the South, with the Soviet Union engaged in North Korea) from Japan after World War II. After three years of military administration by the United States, the South Korean government was established. Syngman Rhee was an anti-Communist, pro-capitalist autocrat that wanted a unified Korea under his rule. He consistently pleaded to the United States for weapons, armor, and warplanes but was denied repeatedly. The state of the newly established South Korean Army was pitiful and meager. Short on heavy weapons, tanks, warplanes, and sometimes even basic small arms, South Korean troops were largely ill disciplined, rough, and incompetent due to not enough funding and training from being recently established. When North Korea had finished preparations for a unification war (large scale mobilization drills, more robust economy than South Korea, centralized rule under Kim Il-sung, stock up of weaponry from the Soviet Union and soon to be Chinese Koreans repatriating from China to bolster the North Korean military from either 50% to 100% of its numbers in 1950), border troops were allowed to provoke South Korea's border troops. A few days before the outbreak of the Korean Civil War, South Korean troops attacked in retaliation for a provocation. North Korea utilized its readiness state to muster its forces within 3 days. On June 25, 1950, North Korea invaded South Korea, sparking the Korean War, the Cold War's first major conflict that continued until 1953. When the North Koreans invaded South Korea in June 1950, using T-34s, the South Koreans had no armor of their own so had to retreat in the face of North Korean tanks. North Korean troops were better trained, had better morale, were versed in guerrilla penetration attack tactics. North Korea nearly reunified the entirety of the Korean Peninsula. Soon after the invasion of South Korea, the United Nations voted to support the South Koreans. With the Korean War so closely following on the heels of World War II, many of the top tanks used in World War II were also utilized during the Korean War. The first tanks to be used by UN forces in South Korea were American M24 Chaffee light tanks, which were also used during the Second World War. They were sent to South Korea from Japanese army bases. While the Chaffee was useful for infantry support, it could not stand up to a T-34.

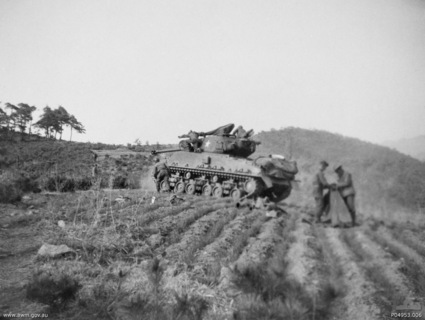
American M4A3E8 Sherman tank at Battle of Kapyong

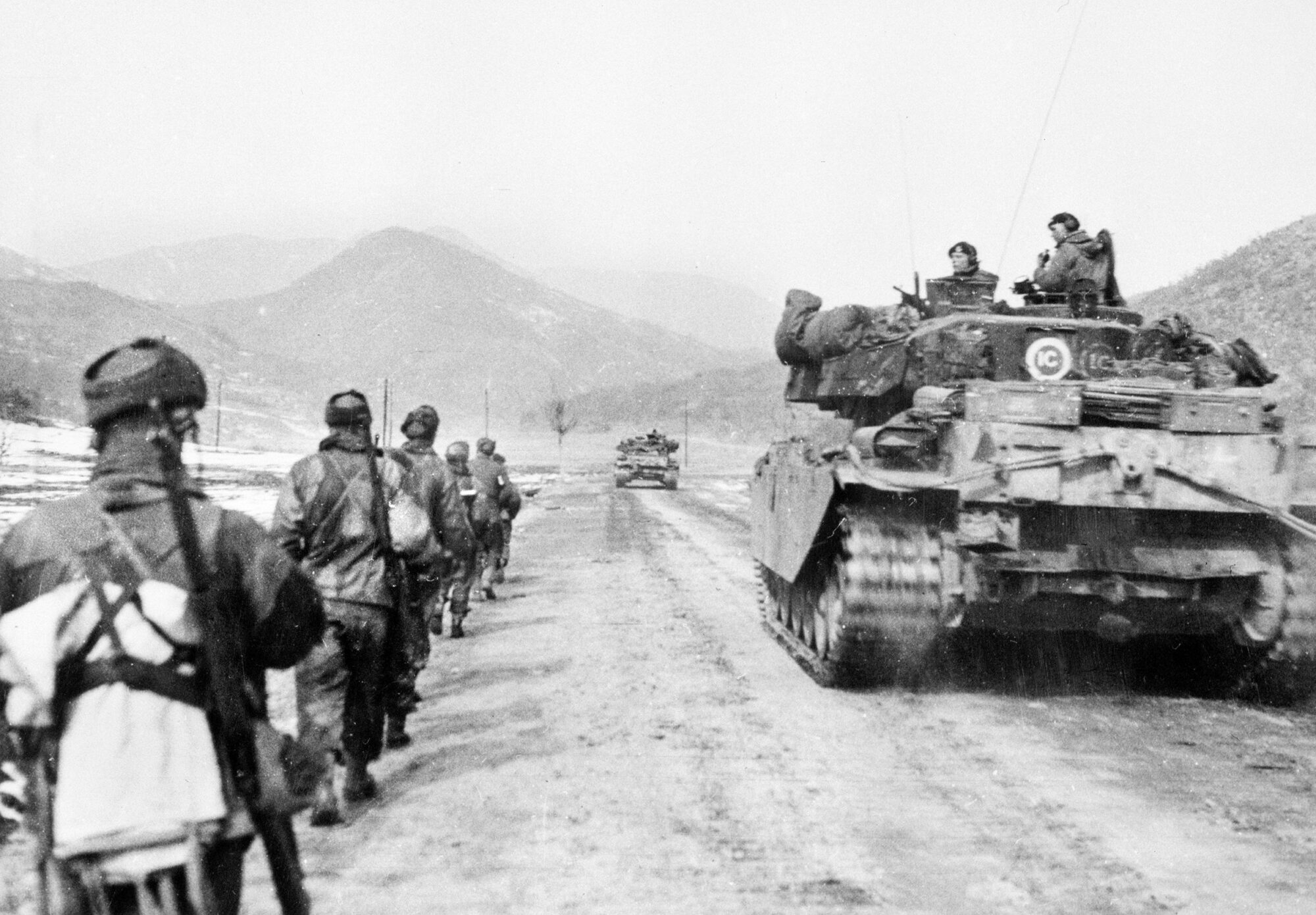
British UN troops advance alongside a Centurion tank, March 1951

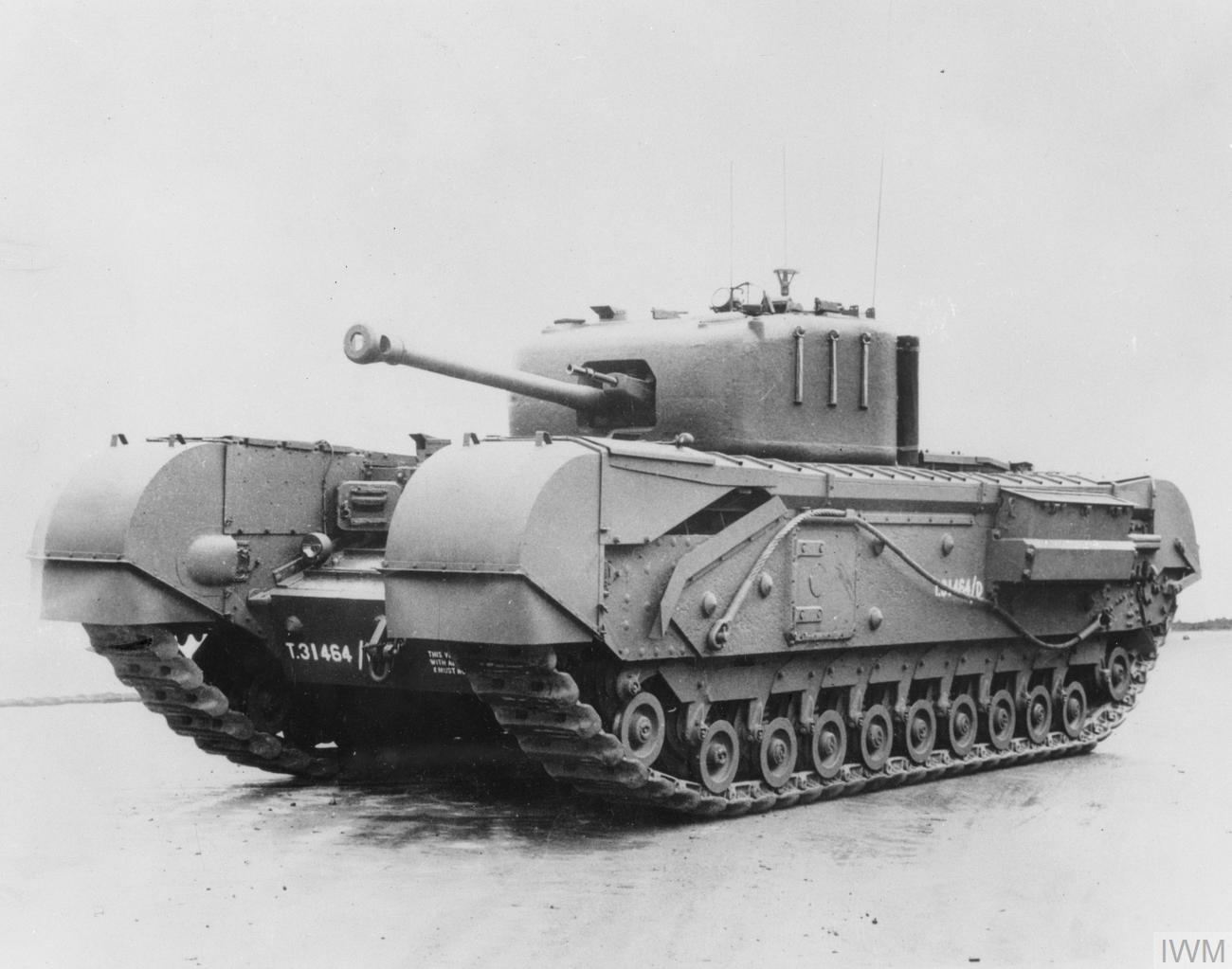
British troops also used the Churchill tank Mark IV

Upon the onset of the Korean War, U.S. forces were sent to defend South Korea against invasion by North Korea and later China. At the time, the Soviet Union had boycotted the United Nations (UN), thus forfeiting their veto rights. This allowed the UN to intervene when it became apparent that the superior North Korean forces would unify the entire country. The North Korea tanks confronted a tankless ROK Army armed with few modern anti-tank weapons, including American World War II–model 2.36 in (60 mm) M9 bazookas, effective only against the 45 mm (1.8 in) side armor of the T-34-85 tank. Under-equipped ROK Army border units used American 105 mm M101 howitzers as anti-tank guns to stop the tanks heading the KPA columns, firing high-explosive anti-tank (HEAT) ammunition over open sights to good effect. At war's start, the ROK Army had 91 howitzers, but lost most to the invaders.

Countering the initial combat imbalance, the UN Command reinforcement matériel included heavier US M4 Sherman, M26 Pershing, M46 Patton, and British Cromwell, Churchill and Centurion tanks that proved effective against North Korean armor, reversing the situation.

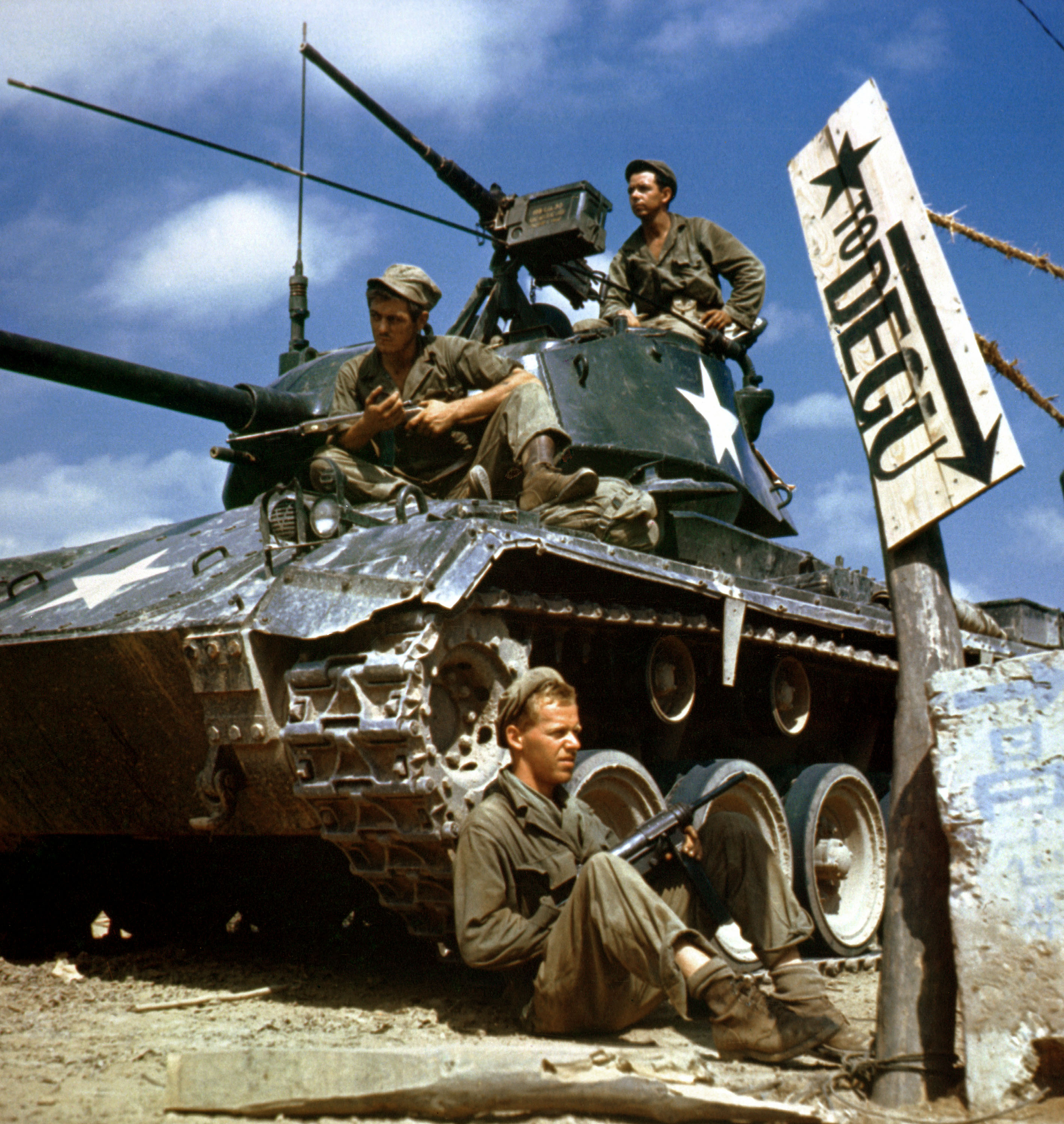
Crew of an M24 tank along the Nakdong River.

In the Korean War M24 Chaffee's fared poorly against the North Korean T-34-85s. So the M24's were put in reconnaissance roles, supported by heavier tanks such as the M4, M26, and M46.

The heavier M26 Pershing was deemed unsatisfactory due to its inferior mobility, and in November, 1949, the upgraded M26 received a new power plant and a main gun with bore evacuator, and the M46 Patton designation. Less than a thousand were upgraded to M46 standard.

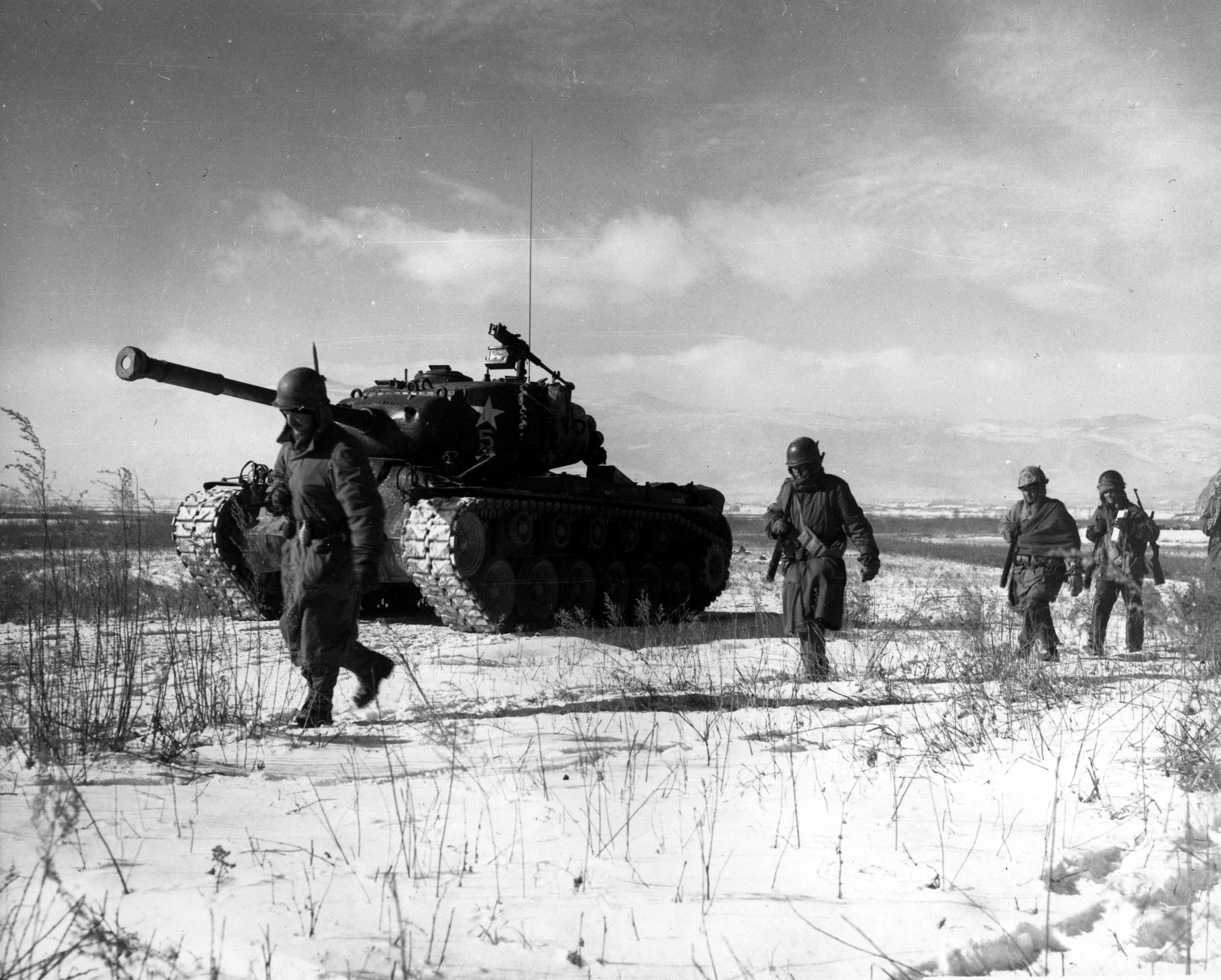
Marines of 1st Marine Division at the Battle of Chosin Reservoir supported by M46 Patton tank.

On 8 August 1950 the first M46 Pattons landed in South Korea. The tank proved superior to the much lighter North Korean T-34-85, which were encountered in relatively small numbers. By the end of 1950, 200 M46 Pattons had been fielded, forming about 15% of US tank strength in Korea; the balance of 1,326 tanks shipped to Korea during 1950 included 679 M4A3 Shermans, 309 M26 Pershings, and 138 M24 Chaffee light tanks. Subsequent shipments of M46 and M46A1 Pattons allowed all remaining M26 Pershings to be withdrawn during 1951, and most Sherman equipped units were also reequipped.

By 1953 the M24 Chaffee's were completely replaced by the new M41 tank in the United States Army which was later designated the M41 Walker Bulldog. The M41 was an agile and well armed. The Walker Bulldog was rushed to the battlefield but saw limited combat.

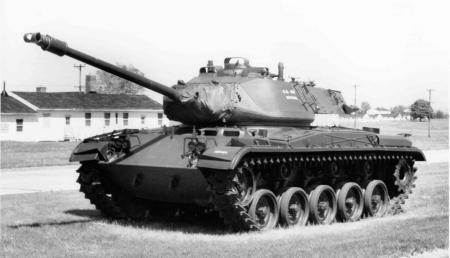
M41 Walker Bulldog

British tanks, such as the Centurion tank and Churchill tank with Cromwell tanks for reconnaissance, arrived in Korea in late 1950. The tanks had to operate in much colder conditions than their usual North German Plain deployments. The Centurions covered the retreat at the battle of the Imjin River and were used throughout the war.

Unlike in the Second World War (1939–45), in which the tank proved a decisive weapon, the Korean War featured few large-scale tank battles. The mountainous, heavily forested terrain prevented large masses of tanks from maneuvering. After huge advances on both sides, and massive losses among Korean civilians in both the north and the south, the war eventually reached a stalemate. The 1953 armistice, never signed by South Korea, split the peninsula along the demilitarized zone near the original demarcation line. No peace treaty was ever signed, resulting in the two countries remaining technically at war.

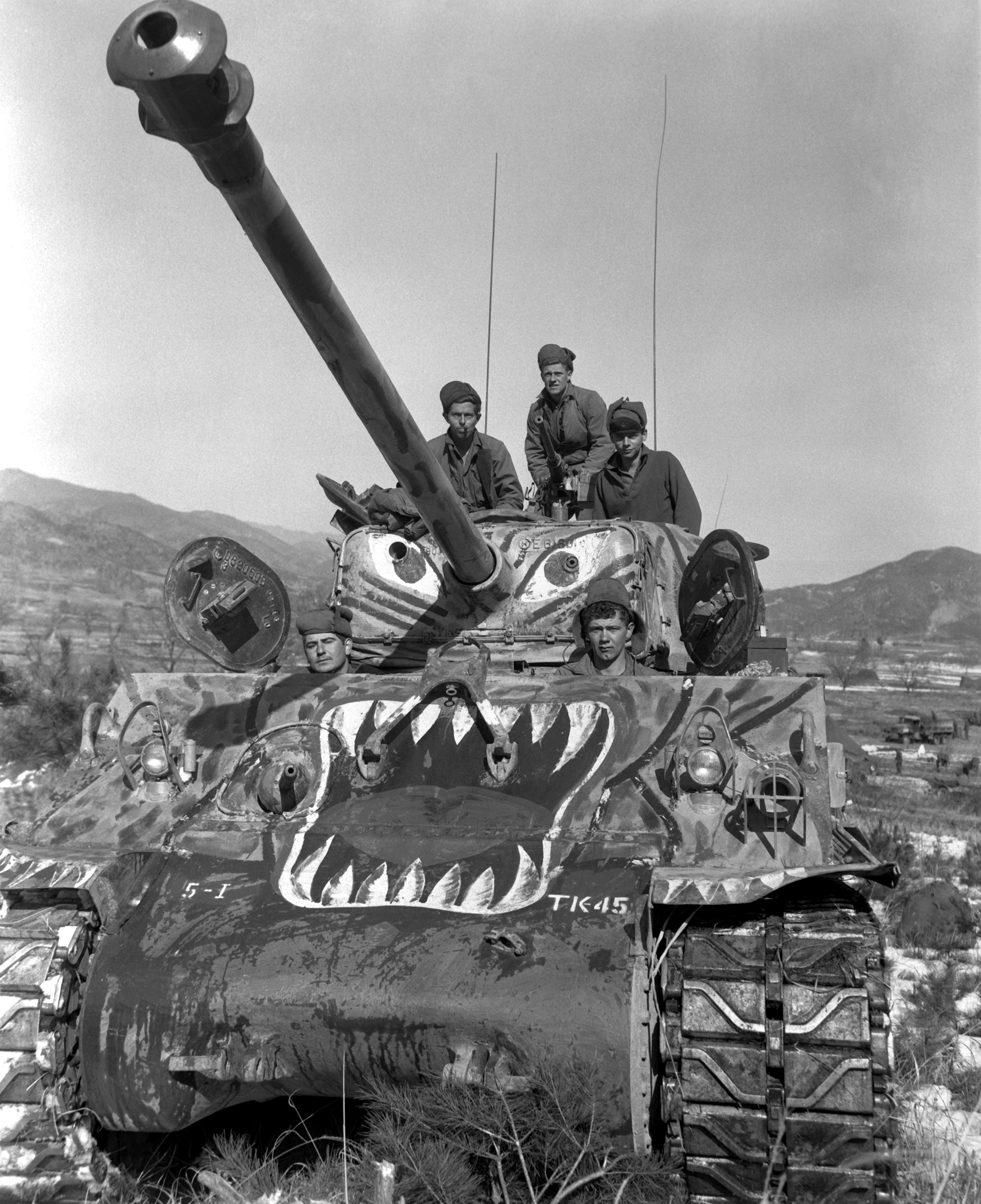
US soldiers in their M4A3E8 Sherman tank (painted with a tiger scheme).

The South Korean Armed Forces were created in 1948, following the division of Korea, and the Republic of Korea Armed Forces is one of the largest standing armed forces in the world. The South Korean armed forces were largely constabulary forces until the outbreak of the Korean War. It was heavily damaged by North Korean and Chinese attacks and in the beginning relied almost entirely on American support for weapons, ammunition and technology. Between 1950 and 1953, during the Korean War, the two opposing armies of South and North Korea received large quantities of military supplies and vehicles and tanks from foreign powers.

=== Organization of South Korean Army armored forces ===
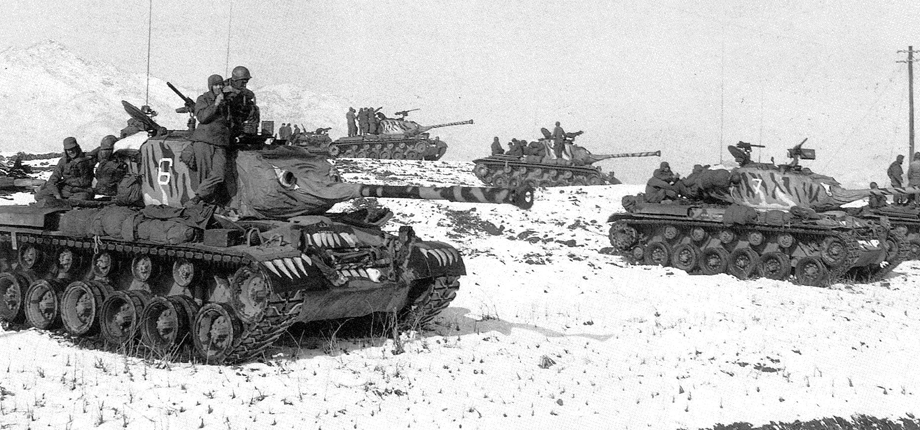
U.S. M46 Patton tanks, painted with tiger heads thought to demoralize Chinese forces.

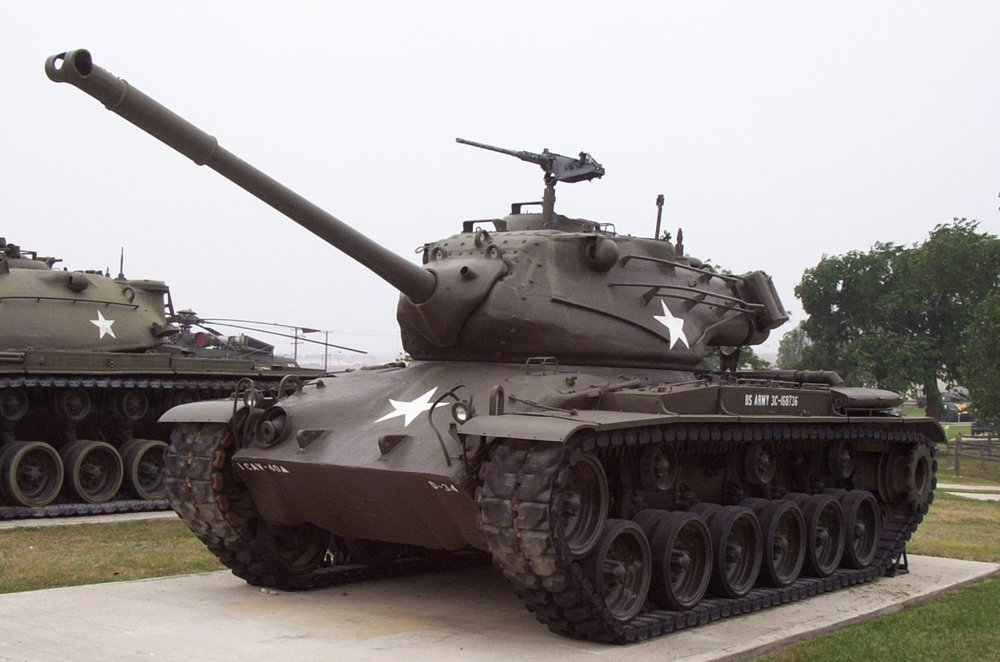
M47 Patton I tank

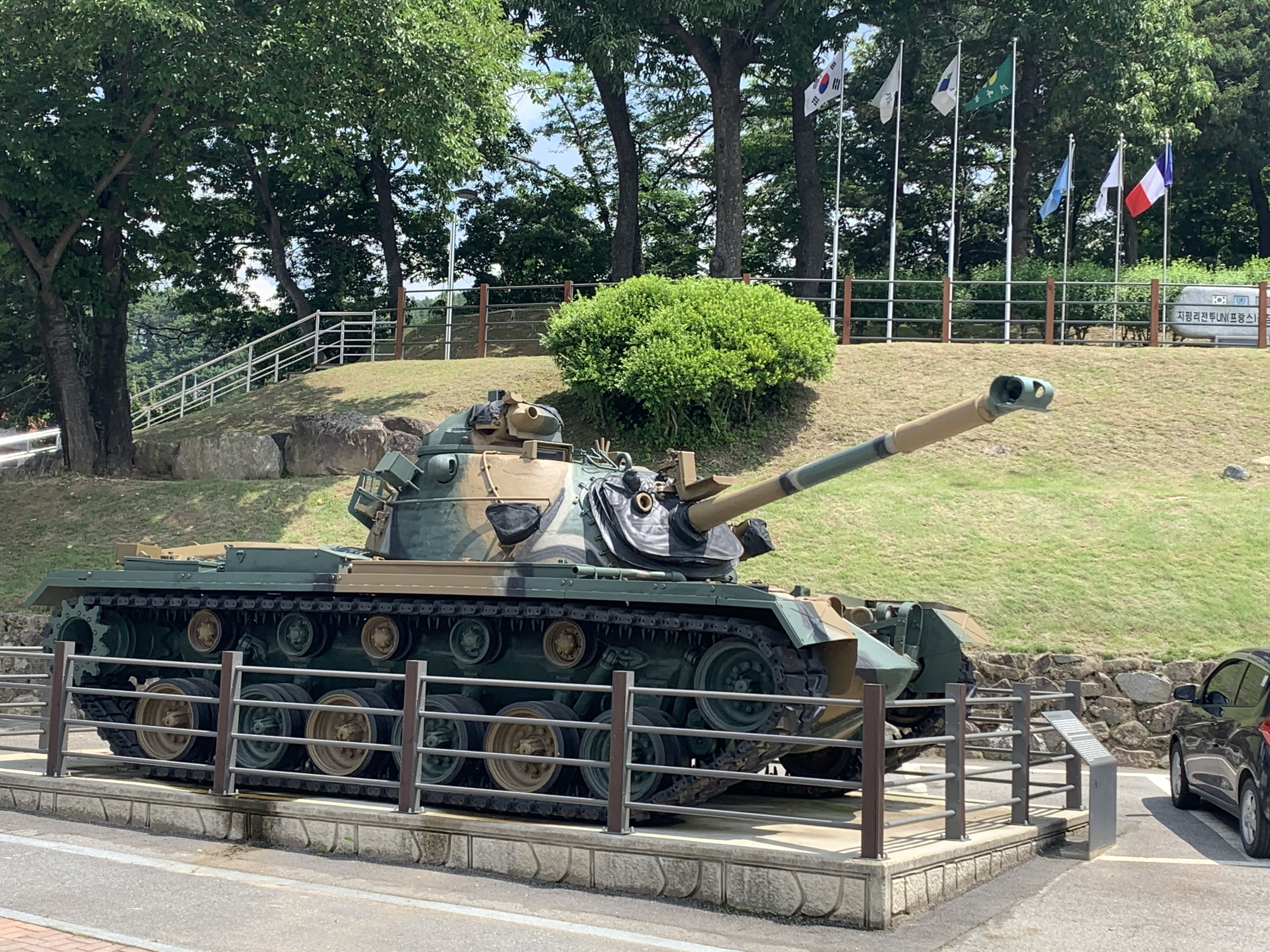
M48A3K tank

Beginning in 1945, the country which became South Korea was controlled by American forces and the remaining IJA forces which remained in place to assist until they were repatriated to Japan.

At the end of World War II, the South Korean Army was formed but with no tanks until the Korean War, and at the beginning counted only on equipment composed of very few armored vehicles and even fewer tanks. The South Korean Army would receive medium battle tanks M4A3E8 "Easy Eight" variant of Sherman tanks, and M47 and M48 Patton series tanks from the United States. These tanks were an important modernization of South Korea armored firepower.

The M4A3E8 "Easy Eight" variant of Sherman tanks, dating back to World War II, were eventually retired from service by the Republic of Korea Army, and the backbone of the South Korean armor was formed up of M47 and M48 Patton tanks which are being phased out and replaced. Tanks of the ROK Army include these older M48 Patton series, as well as the more recent K1, K1A1 which bear a 120 mm smooth-bore gun and are of local manufacture, and Russian-built T-80U. Today the ROK Army has 2,872 tanks, including 1,524 K1 and K1A1 tanks.

== Modern South Korean armor: present ==
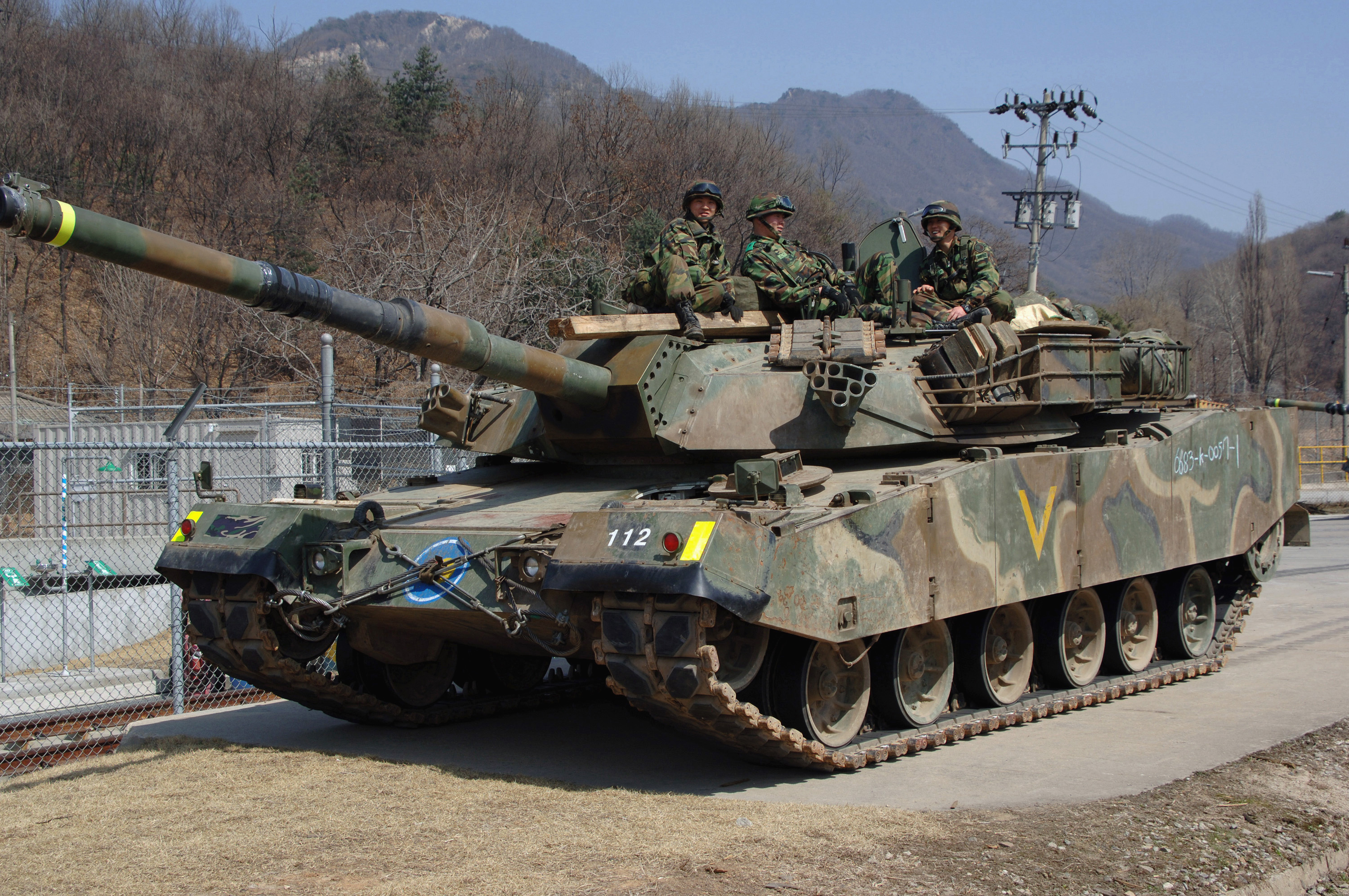
The South Korean K1 tank

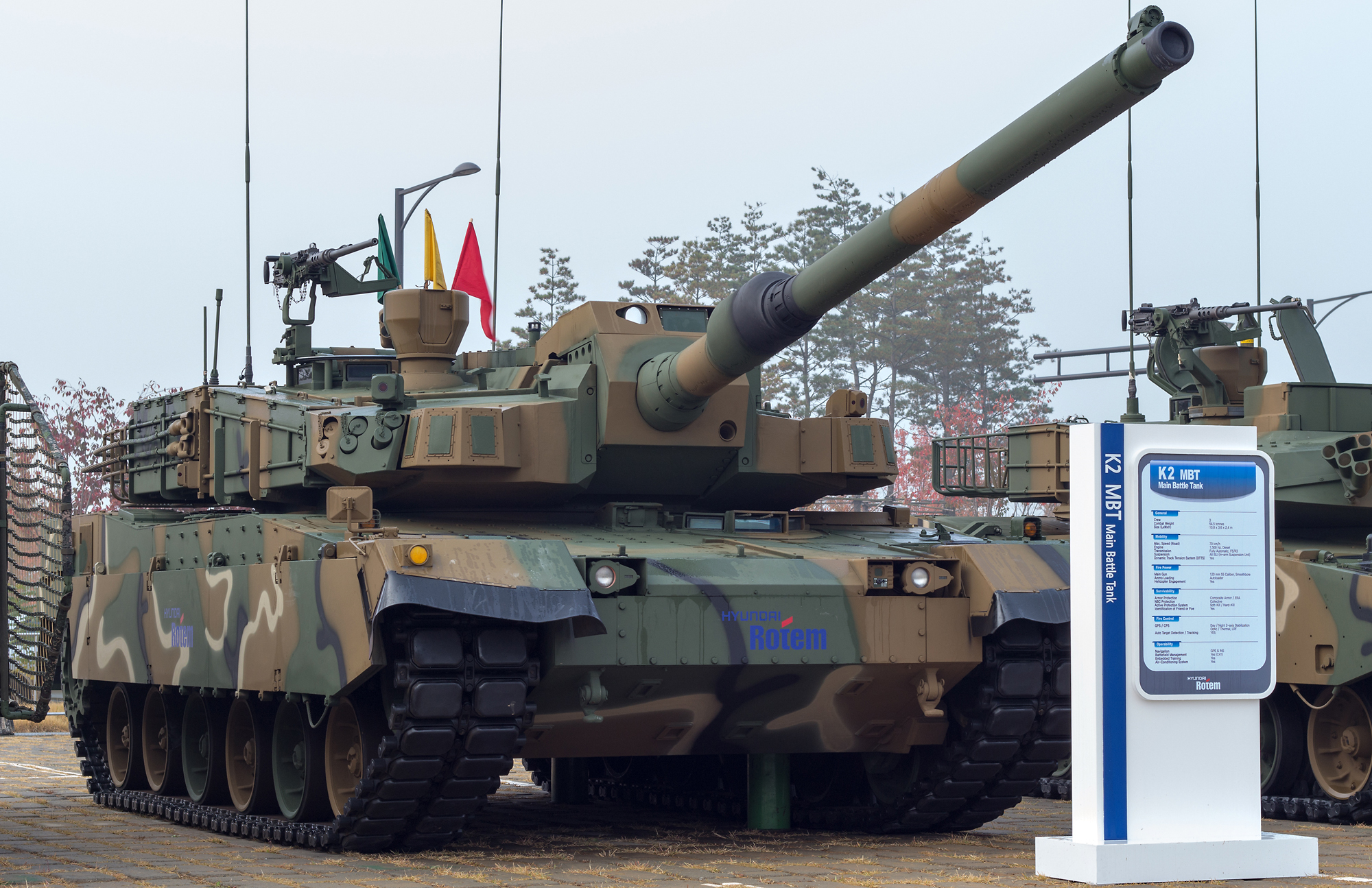
The South Korean K2 Black Panther tank

By the 1970s, the Republic of Korea was desperately in need of additional main battle tanks. M4A3E8 "Easy Eight" variant of Sherman tanks, dating back to World War II, had been retired from service by the Republic of Korea Army, and the backbone of the South Korean armor was formed up of M47 and M48 Patton tanks. Meanwhile, North Koreans had both numerical and technological advantages over the South Korean armor with their T-62 main battle tanks.

At first, attempts were made to obtain the United States' M60A1 Pattons, but they ended in failure. It was deemed that, even if the M60A1s were obtainable, there would not be enough of them to give the South Korean forces a significant advantage over existing North Korean tanks. A number of other plans were also devised, such as upgrading the existing M48 Pattons to the M48A3 and A5 standard, as well as obtaining a license to domestically produce Germany's Leopard 1 main battle tank. Only the upgrades to the Pattons were carried out, with the results being the M48A3K and M48A5K, while producing Leopard 1s was deemed counterproductive so the Koreans made plans to domestically produce main battle tanks that were comparable to the newer generation of main battle tanks. The winning design was based on the XM1, the prototype of M1 Abrams, by Chrysler Defense, the company which was later sold to General Dynamics and renamed General Dynamics Land Systems. Soon afterwards, South Korean officials were dispatched to General Dynamics Land Systems for supervision of the design, which would spawn the XK1. The XK1 retained the XM1's M68E1 105 mm rifled main gun, which would also be domestically produced under license with the designation KM68, as well as a fire control system by Hughes Aircraft Company and the Nd:YAG laser rangefinder. One of the major differences was the addition of tank commander's independent panoramic sights on the XK1, which was missing on XM1, giving the XK1 the capability to utilize the fire-control system (FCS) more effectively, notably by engaging in hunter-killer tactics, which the M1 series could not do until the introduction of the M1A2. The tank commander's panoramic sights were not, however, equipped with light amplification or thermal optics, which led to the tank commander having to rely on personal night vision goggles to operate his sights, while the gunner's sights were equipped with a thermal observation device, which meant that the XK1 had superior sensors until the introduction of the M1A2.

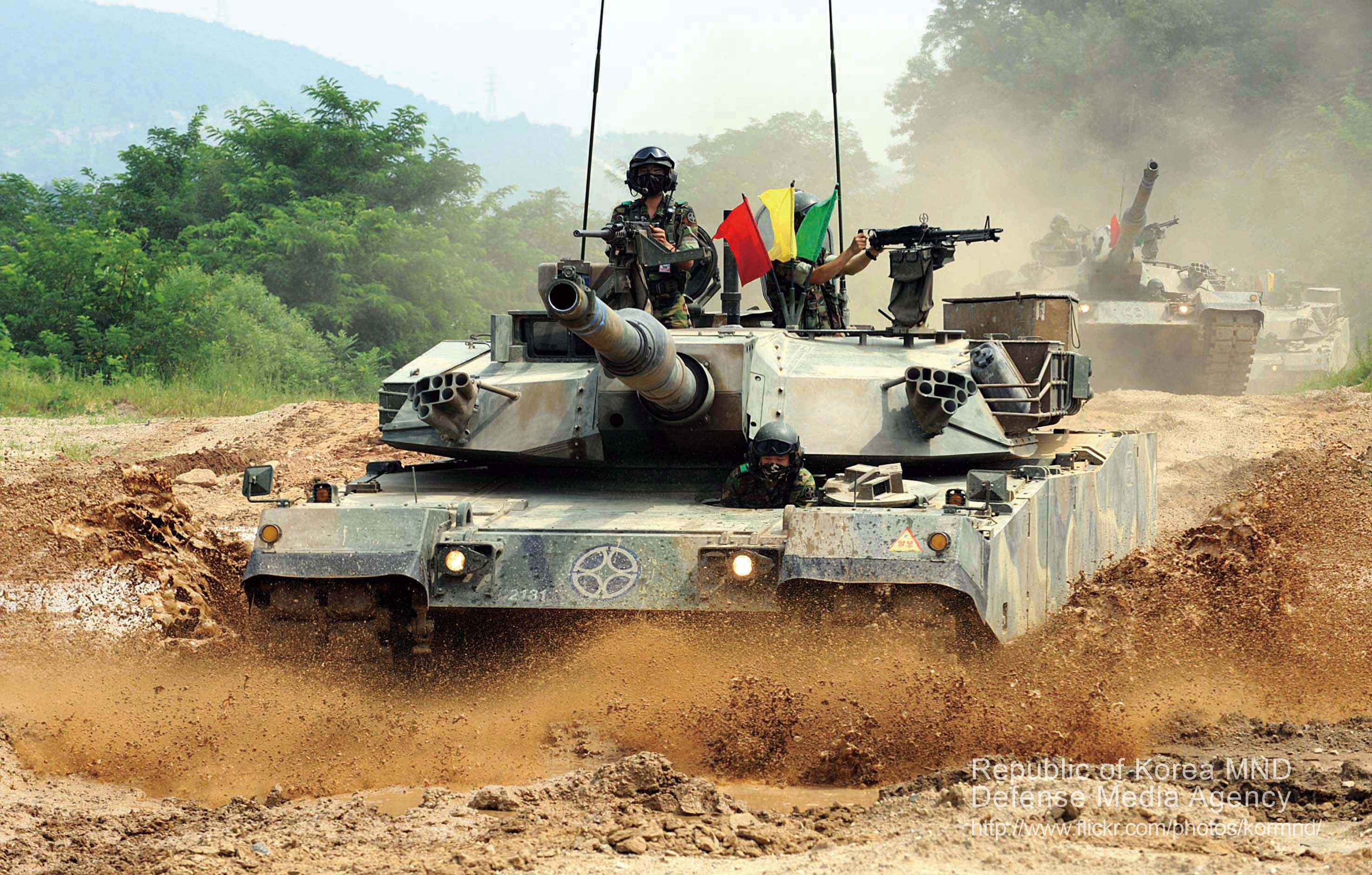
K1A1 tanks of the 20th Mechanized Infantry Division of ROK Army is maneuvering through rough terrain.

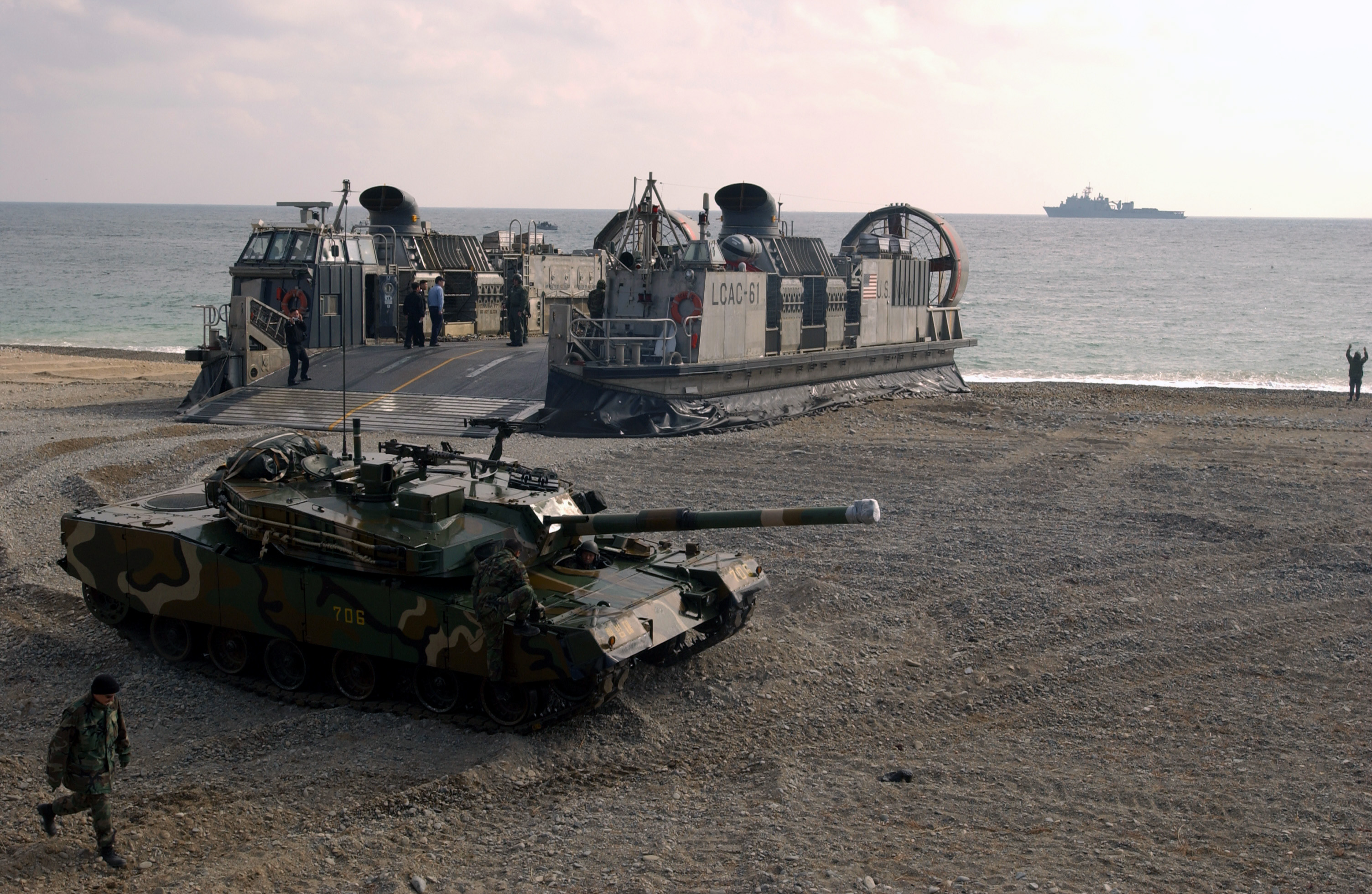
A South Korean K1 88 Main Battle Tank.

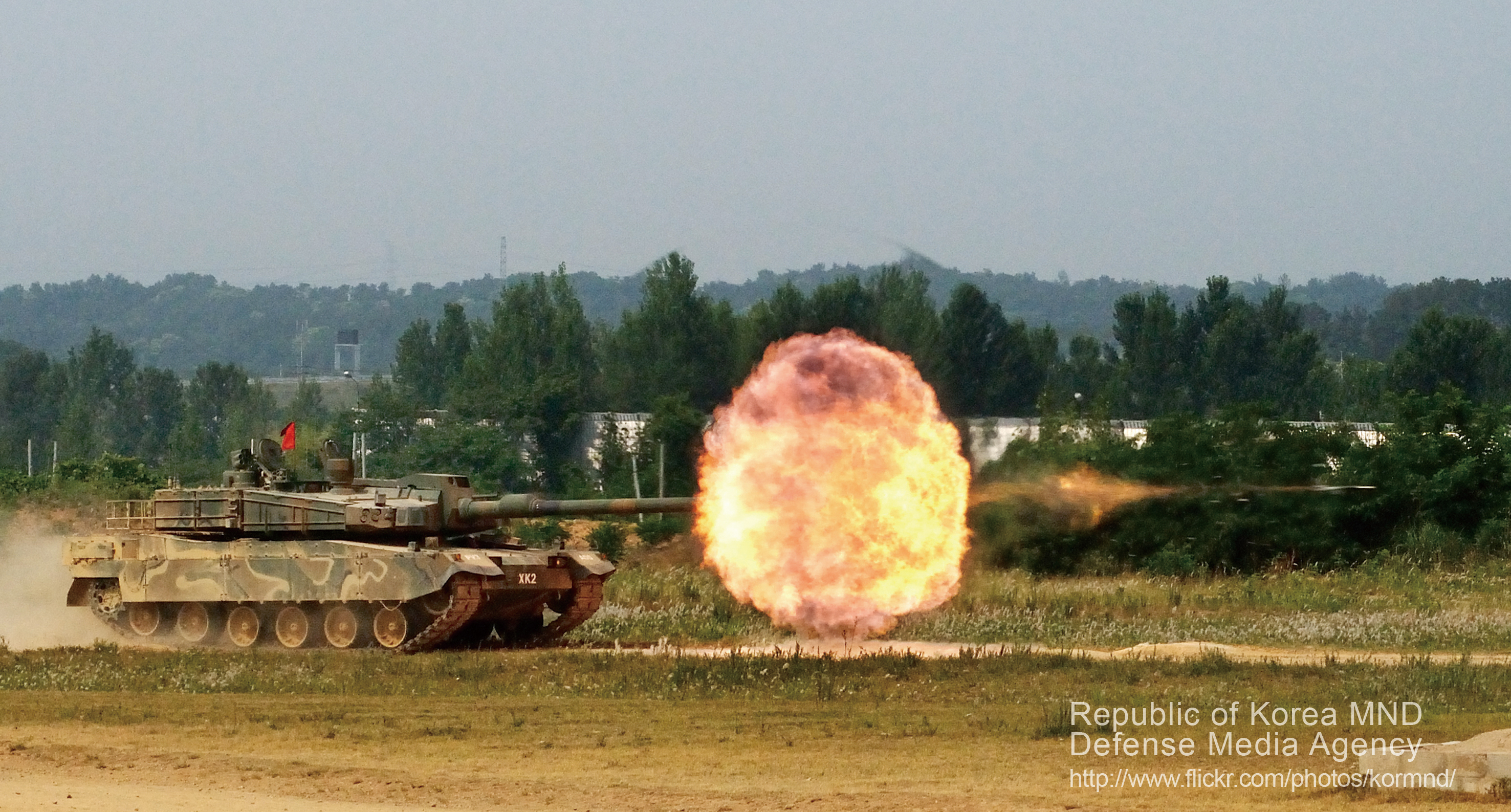
A K2 Black Panther firing its cannon

XK1 tanks are also equipped with a hybrid suspension system consisting of hydropneumatic system on road wheels 1, 2 and 6, while 3, 4 and 5 are equipped with torsion bars, a feature not present on the XM1, granting the XK1 greater stability and ability to elevate and depress the main gun nearly twice as much as tanks equipped with torsion bars alone (+20 to -9.7 degrees for the XK1 versus +10 to -5 for the XM1).

The development of the vehicle was completed in 1983, with a prototype being delivered to the South Korean government in the same year. After the production of approximately 450 K1s, the Gunner's Primary Sights (GPS) designed by Hughes was replaced by the Gunner's Primary Tank Thermal Sights (GPTTS) by Texas Instruments. The new system also replaced the Nd:YAG laser rangefinder used in the Hughes unit with a CO_{2}-based one, which has proven to be safer to the users' eyes, although having less effective range than the former in foul weather. While the exact composition of the armor has still not been released, it has been confirmed that K1 is equipped with composite Chobham armour. Because of issues with the American equipment, the engine and transmission was changed to the German MTU Friedrichshafen MB871Ka-501 water-cooled engine and the ZF Friedrichshafen LSG 3000 transmission for the power pack. This was upgraded to the K1A1 is an up-gunned variant with a 120 mm 44 caliber smoothbore gun, and outfitted with more modern electronics, ballistic computers, fire control systems, and armor.

South Korea was given 35 T-80U tanks to pay Russian debts incurred during the days of the Soviet Union. The tanks came in three batches; the first consisted of six T-80Us in 1996, followed by 27 in 1997, and finally two in 2005.

Today the South Korean army has 2,500 tanks in operation, including the K1A1 and K2 Black Panther, which form the backbone of the South Korean army's mechanized armor and infantry forces. A sizable arsenal of many artillery systems, including 1,700 self-propelled K55 and K9 Thunder howitzers and 680 helicopters and UAVs of numerous types, are assembled to provide additional fire, reconnaissance, and logistics support. South Korea's smaller but more advanced artillery force and wide range of airborne reconnaissance platforms are pivotal in the counter-battery suppression of North Korea's over-sized artillery force, which operates more than 13,000 artillery systems deployed in various state of fortification and mobility.

The replacement for the K1 MBT is known as the K2 Black Panther (Korean: 흑표), fitted with a 1,500 hp (1,100 kW) water-cooled Diesel engine, 120 mm/L55 main gun, and coaxial machine guns. The K2 also features radar equipment as well as all-bearing laser detection system and reactive armor comparable to the American M1A2 and French Leclerc. The first batch of K2s was delivered to the ROK military in 2014.

== List of armored equipment of the Republic of Korea Armed Forces ==
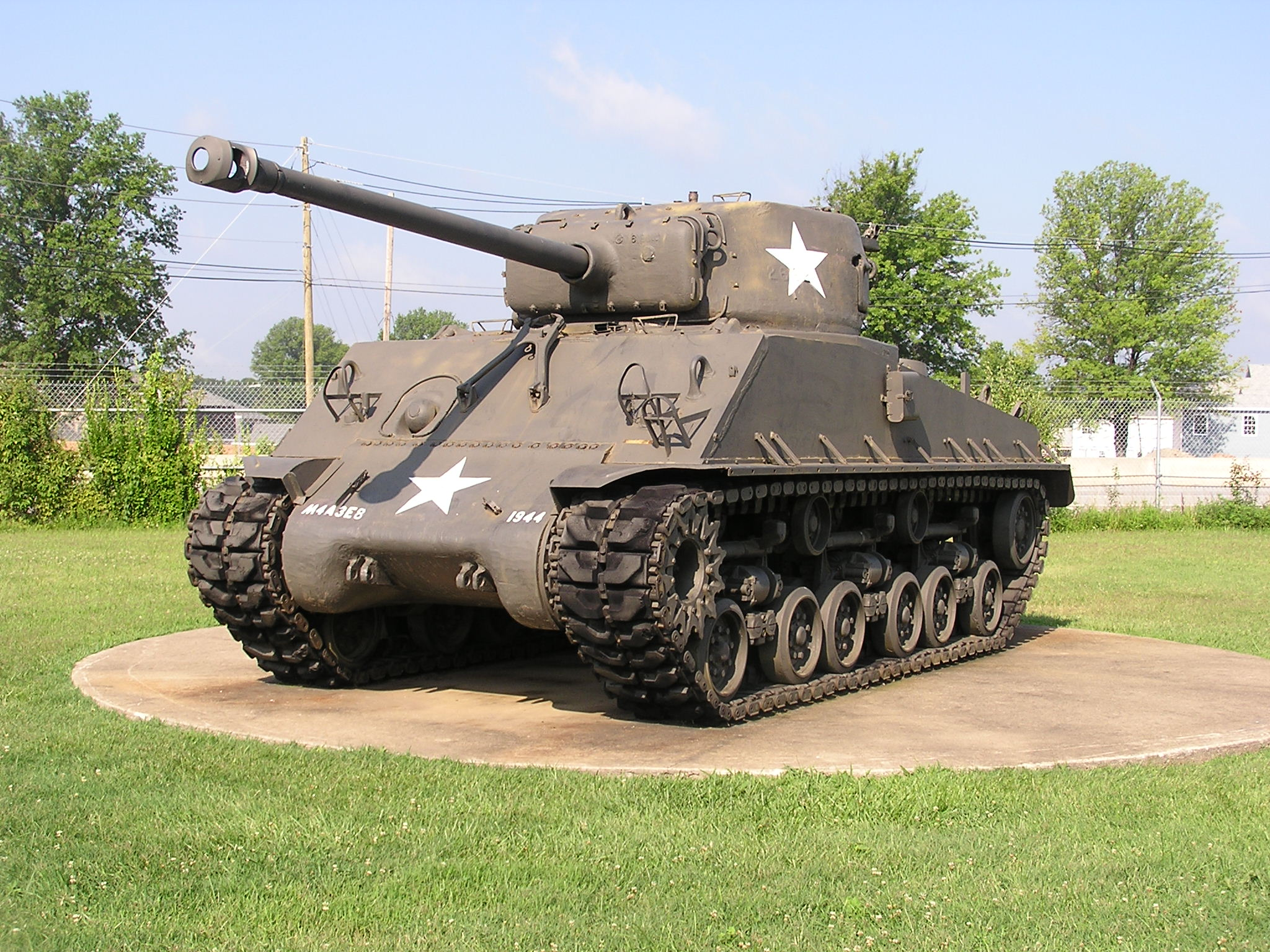
A Sherman M4A3E8 "Easy Eight" variant 76 mm armed tank

=== Tanks ===
- M4A3E8 (retired)
- M47 Patton (retired)
- M48A3K & M48A5K MBTs
- T-80U MBTs
- K1 & K1A1 MBTs
- K2 Black Panther MBT

=== Armored vehicles ===
- M113
- K200 & K200A1 series
- BMP-3
- K532
- KM900
- Doosan Barracuda
- K21 KNIFV
- KAAV7A1

== See also ==
- History of the tank
- Tanks in World War I
- List of interwar armoured fighting vehicles
- Tanks in World War II
- Tank classification
- List of military vehicles
- List of main battle tanks by country
