= VAE (vehicle) =

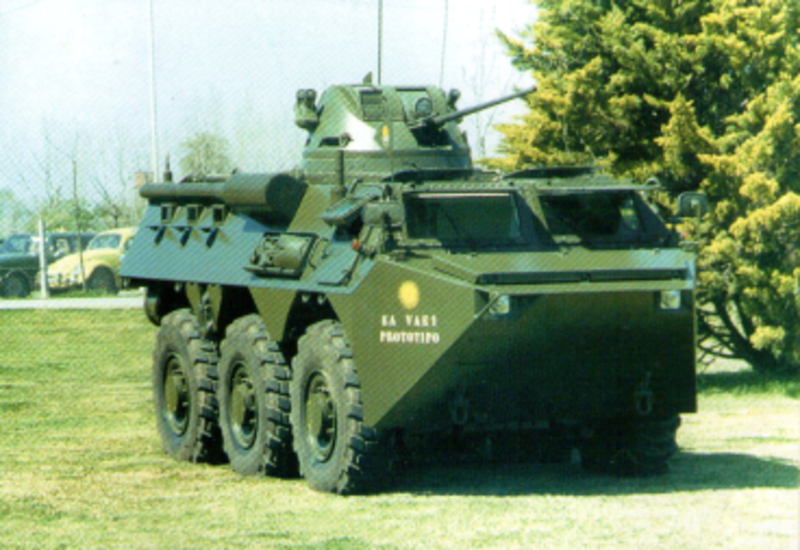
- Type: Armored Personnel Carrier
- Place of origin: Argentina

Production history
- Designed: 1979
- Manufacturer: TENSA; TEMSA
- No. built: 2

Specifications
- Mass: 15.0 t
- Length: 5.70 m
- Width: 2.85 m
- Height: 2.67 m
- Crew: 3 + 10 passengers
- Main armament: 20 mm Rheinmetall Rh-202
- Secondary armament: 2 × 7.62mm
- Engine: 4-cylinder in-line Perkins diesel 260 hp
- Suspension: 4 × 4 (VAE-2); 6 × 6 (VAE-1)
- Ground clearance: 0.48 m
- Operational range: 1000 km
- Maximum speed: 92 km/h

The Vehículo Anfibio de Exploración (VAE, "Amphibious Exploration Vehicle") was an armored personnel carrier project developed by Argentina in the 1970s.

== History ==
The production of armored vehicles in Argentina ceased after the production of 16 Nahuel tanks in 1940. In 1960, Plan Europa was formulated, planning for the development of armored vehicles production in Argentina. In 1968, under license from French firms, AMX-13 light tanks were manufactured at the Astarsa shipyard. By the 1970s, Argentina had become the second largest arms producer in Latin America (after Brazil), producing equipment such as ships, military aircraft and rifles, and the government was attempting to produce its own armored vehicles. In 1974, the West German firm Thyssen-Henschel received a contract for the development of the medium tank TAM and the infantry fighting vehicle TAM VCTP. In January 1979, the state-owned company TEMSA ordered the French companies Renault and Panhard to build prototypes of a wheeled armored personnel carrier for the Argentine Army. Panhard worked with the Argentine company Talleres Electromecánicos Norte S. A. (TENSA) and Renault with Astilleros Argentinos Río de la Plata S. A. The reconnaissance vehicle Vehículo Anfibio Pesado de Exploración (VAPE), was also developed concurrently by the two companies.

The contract called for the construction of 1000 units, to be assembled at the factory of TENSA in Córdoba. The Renault VAE (VAE 1) was the first to be presented, being built on the basis of Renault's own VAB. Panhard later presented their own prototype, VAE 2. The prototypes were then tested on rugged, mountainous and swampy areas. While the tests were successful, the military dictatorship of the National Reorganization Process was then involved in the Dirty War, and financial difficulties caused the discontinuation of the project.

== Design and specifications ==
At the time, Argentina did not have a developed road network and required fast, lightweight military equipment. The VAE/VAPE, along with the TAM/VCTP and the plane DINFIA IA 38, was developed with this in mind. This allowed VAE to be easily transportable by air in a military cargo aircraft. VAE was designed to transport men to the battlefield while protecting them from gunfire of up to 7.62 mm caliber and from landmines, with armor on the bottom and sides of the armored vehicle.

The steel armor is bulletproof and splinter-proof, and the vehicle is equipped with NBC protection, air conditioning and fire extinguishers. In addition to the crew of three, one of whom is the operator of the turret weapons, the vehicle is capable of transporting 10 fully equipped infantrymen. The 900 kg turret is located behind the engine compartment in the center of the hull.

The VAE is equipped with a 20mm Rheinmetall Rh-202 gun located in the FL20 turret produced by Creusot-Loire. The ammunition stock is 130 rounds. In addition, the vehicle has two 7.62 mm machine guns with 1000 rounds.

== Variants ==
- VAE-1 (6 × 6) – Renault armored vehicle variant.
- VAE-2 (4 × 4) – Panhard armored vehicle variant.

== Bibliography ==
- Piñeiro, Luis F. (August 2006). "VAE-VAPE". Ares World Defense Security (in Spanish). No. 3. Buenos Aires. ISSN 1669-7332.
