= TH-495 =

TH 495 Infantry Combat Vehicle (ICV)
- Type: Infantry fighting vehicle
- Place of origin: Germany; Canada

Specifications
- Mass: 21.6 t
- Length: 5.97m
- Width: 2.94m
- Height: 2.39m
- Crew: 3 (+ 6 or 7 passengers)
- Main armament: Oto Melara T25 25 mm chain gun with TIS with 630 rounds
- Secondary armament: 12.7mm guns
- Engine: 500 Kw/680 HP
- Operational range: 500km
- Maximum speed: 75 km/h

TH-495 was an infantry combat vehicle being proposed by German-based Thyssen-Henschel for NATO countries, but it was primarily being pitched to the Canadian Forces and the then government of Brian Mulroney in the 1990s. While designed in Germany, the TH-495 would have been produced by a newly established Thyssen-Henschel Canadian subsidiary called Bear Head Industries Limited in Cape Breton, Nova Scotia. The proposal was scrapped by the incoming government of Jean Chrétien, which opted to purchase the LAV III from GM Defense instead.

The lobby process for this vehicle by Karlheinz Schreiber and the involvement of Mulroney has led to a public inquiry The Oliphant Commission.

== Design ==
=== Armament ===
The TH-495 is fitted with a two-man turret, armed with a stabilized T-25 25 mm caliber chain gun and coaxial 7.62-mm machine gun. One more 12.7 mm machine gun is positioned on top of the turret. The ammunition capacity is approximatively 1200 rounds; 630 rounds ready to fire and 510 in storage.

=== Mobility ===
The TH-495 is powered by a diesel engine developing 680 horsepower, and can reach speeds of 75 kilometres per hour. The TH-495 is fitted with a modern dual circuit brake system. The TH-495 has a maximum road range of 500 kilometers. The TH-495 offers quieter movement for improved stealth, greater speed over good terrain, and higher ground clearance for protection against mines and improvised explosive devices.

=== Protection ===
The basic armor of the TH-495, covering the standardization agreement STANAG 4569 level 4, which provides an all-round protection against 14.5x114mm. The modular add-on armor plating can be easily and quickly exchanged to adapt to the ballistic protection requirement of each variant for each mission threats situation. The TH-495 was designed to produce a very low and very compact structure to minimize radar and IR-signatures. The TH-495 is fitted with a nuclear, biological, chemical (NBC) filtration system accompanied with a chemical detector and radiation detector systems. The TH-495 also uses heat-absorbing filters to provide temporary protection against thermal imaging (TIS), image intensifier and infrared camera (IR).

== Variants ==
- Command Post Vehicle (CPV)
- Infantry Section Carrier (ISC)
- Combat Engineer Vehicle (CEV)
- Observation Post Vehicle (OPV)
- TOW Under Armour (TUA)
- Air Defense Anti-Tank System (ADATS)
- Armoured Gun System (AGS)
- Armoured Ambulance (AA)
- Logistical Transport

== See also ==
- Rheinmetall Marder (IFV) Germany
- BAE Systems AB Combat Vehicle 90 Sweden
- Rheinmetall/Krauss-Maffei Puma (IFV) Germany
- GKN Warrior tracked armoured vehicle United Kingdom
- United Defense M2/M3 Bradley Fighting Vehicle United States
