= Dongmyeong Unit =

UN peacekeeping force of South Korea

- Hangul: 동명부대
- Hanja: 東明部隊
- Revised Romanization: Dongmyeong Budae
- McCune–Reischauer: Tongmyŏng Pudae

Dongmyeong Unit banner

Dongmyeong Unit logo

Dongmyeong Unit (Korean: 동명부대; Hanja: 東明部隊; dongmyeong means 'light from the east') is one of the UN Peacekeeping Forces sent to Lebanon by the Republic of Korea Armed Forces (ROKA). It was formed on 21 June 2007. The conflict in Lebanon began in 1975, after an outbreak of armed clashes between Christians and the Lebanese, Syrian and Israeli militaries leading into the Lebanese Civil War. To prevent ongoing hostilities, the United Nations passed United Nations Security Council (UNSC) resolutions 425 and 426, activating the United Nations Interim Force in Lebanon (UNIFIL). As part of its contribution to UN forces, the Republic of Korea sent the Dongmyeong Unit as a rotational force to Lebanon in July 2007. The Dongmyeong Unit consisted of 300 people, including one battalion of Korean Special Forces and specialist troops filling various roles including engineering, communications, transport, maintenance and medical support.

The Dongmyeong Unit is the fifth Peace Keeping Operation (PKO) mission of the Republic of Korea and the second combat unit raised after the Sangnoksu Unit. The Dongmyeong Unit is named after Dongmyeong of Goguryeo.

== Activation ==
UNIFIL has been working to mediate a resolution to the Lebanese Civil War and the conflict with Israel since 1978. In 2006, renewed armed clashes between Israel and Hezbollah caused over 1000 civilian casualties. To resolve the conflict, the United Nations (UN) adopted UNSC resolution 1701, requesting member nations to send up to 15,000 troops as part of UNIFIL. The South Korean government passed the agenda in a cabinet meeting in November 2006 and it was agreed to by the assembly in December. Consequently, the first rotation of the Dongmyeong Unit in Lebanon with 350 soldiers was deployed on 18 June 2007. On 26 July 2016, the eighteenth rotation was sent to Lebanon. The Dongmyeong Unit has been carrying out its duties since the dispatch.

Unit	Period	Commander
1st	2007.07.18–2008.01.15	Colonel Kim Woong-geon
2nd	2008.01.15–2008.07.18	Colonel Kang Chan-ok
3rd	2008.07.18–2009.01.21	Lieutenant Colonel Lim Dae-sub
4th	2009.01.21–2009-07.27	Lieutenant Colonel Lee Myung-ha
5th	2009.07.27–2010.01.21	Lieutenant Colonel Kim Jong-chan
6th	2010.01.21–2010.07.22	Lieutenant Colonel Kang Jeong-deok
7th	2010.07.22–2011.01.27	Lieutenant Colonel Kim Hee-jun
8th	2011.01.27–2011.07.21	Lieutenant Colonel Park Gyeong-sik
9th	2011.07.21–2012.01.19	Lieutenant Colonel Lee Yoon-hoe
10th	2012.01.19–2012.07.19	Lieutenant Colonel Kim Jae-kyu
11th	2012.07.19–2013.01.17	Lieutenant Colonel Ha Jong-Shik
12th	2013.01.17–2013.07.19	Lieutenant Colonel Moon Byeong-kwon
13th	2013.07.19–2014.01.10	Lieutenant Colonel Kim Si-beom
14th	2014.01.10–2014.07.25	Lieutenant Colonel Choi Moon-kyu
15th	2014.07.25–2015.01.14	Colonel Ham Nam-kyu
16th	2015.01.14–2015.12.05	Colonel Lee Yoon-seok
17th	2015.12.05–2016.07.26	Colonel Kim Sang-sik
18th	2016.07.26–	Colonel Yang Jeon-sub

== Missions ==
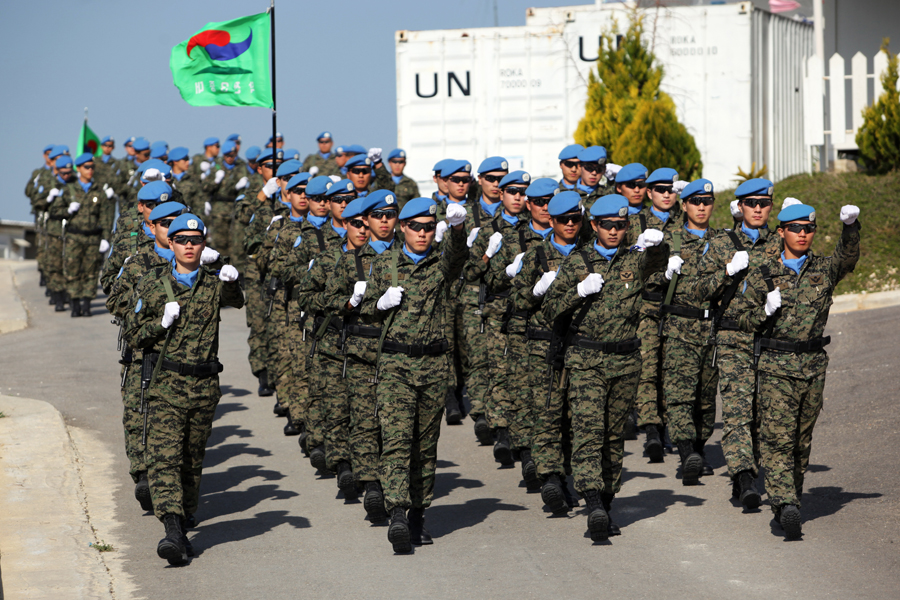
The Members of Unit Dongmyeong are marching after receiving a UN peace medal at the UN peace parade.

Unit tasks include surveillance reconnaissance operations monitoring any influx of armed forces or illegal weapons, collaborative operations with citizens for establishing a friendly operations environment, support for Lebanese Armed Forces (LAF), supporting systems, and maintaining personnel or battalion protective posture. The Dongmyeong Unit falls under the western brigade of UNIFIL, and is responsible for the Tyre region. The battalion conducts a surveillance watch of the area eight times a day to successfully execute numerous operations without incident.

== Organization ==
- Commander: The commander of the Dongmyeong Unit is an officer holding the rank of either colonel or lieutenant Colonel. The leader of the eighteenth rotation, Yang Jeon-sub, took over as commander of the unit on July 26, 2016.
- Operational forces: These forces are the Dongmyeong Unit's principle combat element and are primarily composed of Korean Special Forces units. They conduct fixed surveillance patrols, allied patrol, Explosive Ordnance Disposal (EOD) reconnaissance, rapid response, staging and civil action.
- Operational support forces: These forces support operational actions by providing Combat Service Support (CSS). They are composed of an engineer company, an armored platoon that operates an armoured (TM-170) car, a surveillance section and an EOD section for explosive ordnance disposal.
- Forces under direct control: These forces are divided into three categories: medical, military police and counter-terrorism. The Medical Force provides medical support to soldiers, local residents and livestock. The Military Police Force is responsible for the discipline and security of the troops. The Counter-terrorism Team conducts counter-terrorism and security support missions.

== Symbols ==
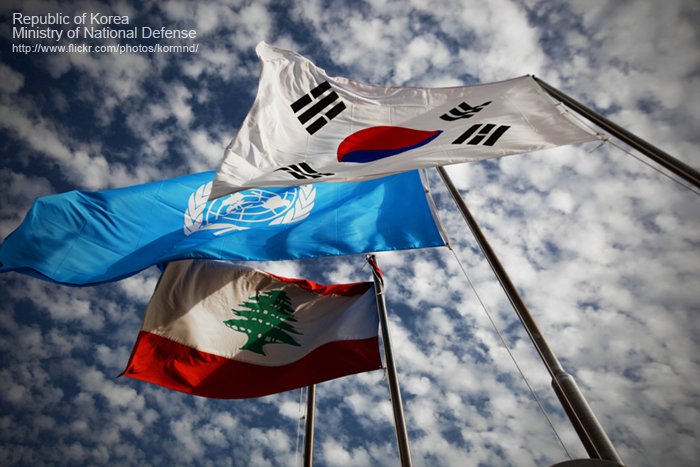
Flag of Dongmyeong Unit , The Dongmyeong Unit flag is visible with a taegukki.

The name of the Dongmyeong Unit (Hanja: 東明, 'the light from the east') has a symbolic meaning of "a peaceful light for Lebanon from the East." The symbol of the unit consists of a Taegeuk mark and an evergreen hill as a background. The green background symbolizes green pastures and represents hope and peace. A Taegeuk mark located in middle represents peace and safety, while the Blue Hill stands for South Korea's humanitarian aid and relief activities. The slogan of the Dongmyeong Unit is 'complication of any mission as a whole!'.

== Major operations ==
The Dongmyeong Unit holds the longest record for dispatch duration among all South Korean UN Peacekeeping Forces. Although initially a poor country that required international aid in the 1950s, South Korea has developed a strong economy and now actively seeks to provide support to countries in need of help.

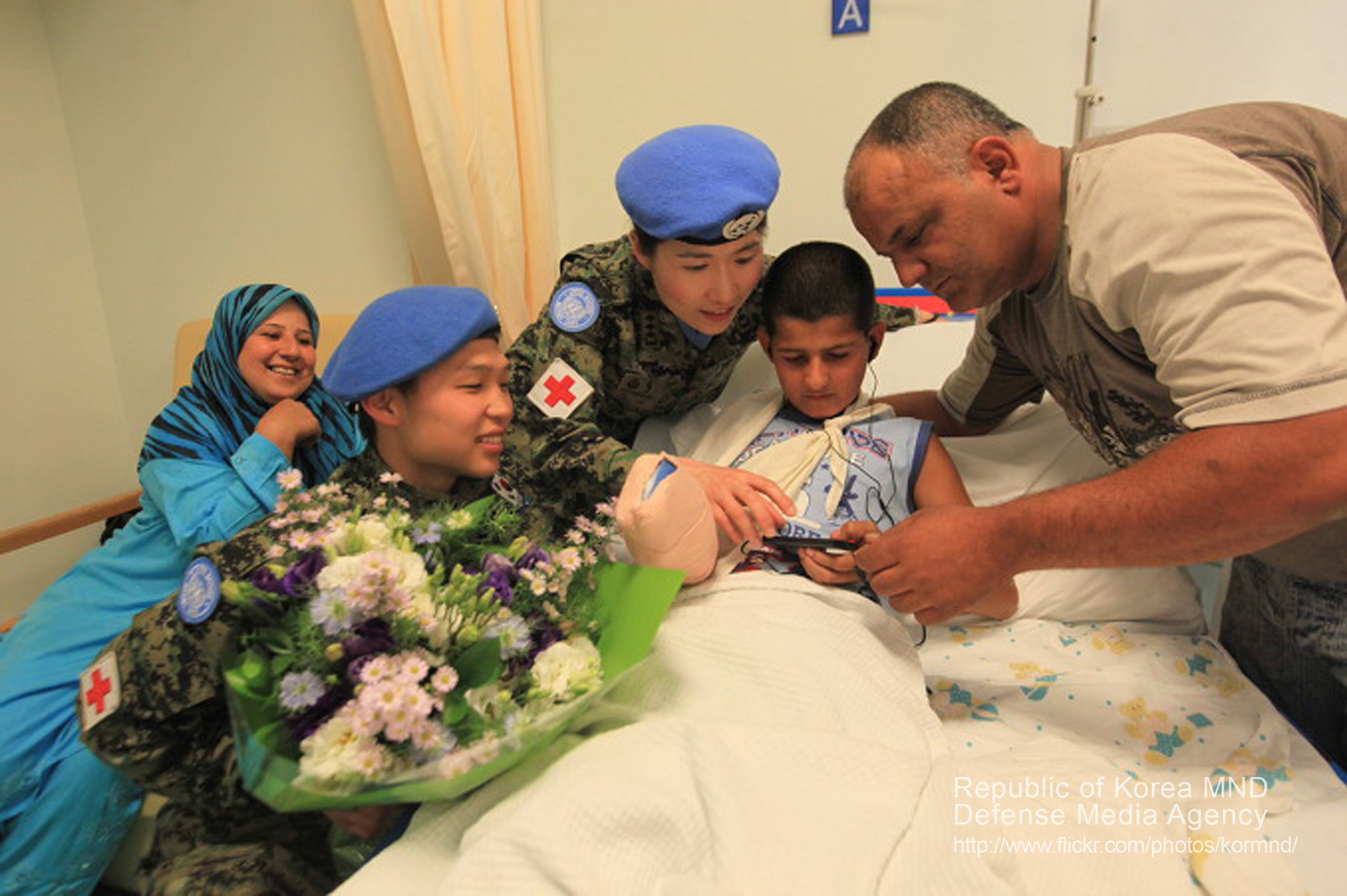
The Dongmyeong unit 's medical care support, Dongmyeong Unit support their medical care for civilians.

The Dongmyeong Unit conducts a diverse range of operations. In addition to its security role, it also seeks to engage citizens in Lebanon by establishing various classes near their unit post for learning computer skills, sewing, and Taekwondo. The Dongmyeong Unit also actively supports medical care for civilians by touring five villages a week. Having treated approximately 81,816 people in Lebanon, locals call the Unit a 'Gift from God' and 'Familiar Neighbor'.

== Accomplishment and evaluation ==
The Dongmyeong Unit had conducted 30,576 reconnaissance operations as of December 2016. They identified 13 vehicles that were suspected to be used in a terror operation. They have conducted 81,816 medical missions. Dongmyeong Unit were involved in the welfare of Lebanon as well as providing military aid. The Unit conducted 215 civic welfare projects, such as improvements of public facilities (K-Road), school facilities and sewerage facilities. They delivered computer training to the local population, along with lesson in Hangul and Taekwondo, sewing. They established libraries (K-Library) in five villages for children and teenagers.

Dongmyeong Unit received excellent reviews in operational performance. Recently, they received an "excellent" rating on combined training (COMBINE-X) which was operated by the western brigade of UNIFIL.

== Recognition ==
On December 3, 2014, 316 soldiers of fifteenth rotation of Dongmyeong received the United Nations Medal. With the presentation, the forces were noted as not only being the longest dispatched Korean peacekeeping troops, but also recorded as the most frequent recipients of the UN Medal. Dongmyeong soldiers have received a total of 5,091 medals over the seven-year deployment.

UN Secretary-General Ban Ki-moon, who visited the Dongmyeong Unit on January 17, 2009, said, "It is greatly contributing that your efforts and devotions for peacekeeping of Lebanon which enhance not only peace of the world but status of Republic of Korea. Tahsin Mubarak ali, the principal of the local school, said, "The generous support of the Dongmyeong Unit has restored laughter to the children who were socially and psychologically depressed. I thanks for setting up a place where kids can play freely." As recognition of their achievement, Dongmyeong Unit was evaluated as "Supreme Forces" among 39 nation's forces in Lebanon. They conferred an honorary citizenship for the first time among the Foreign Armies.
