= TM-170 =

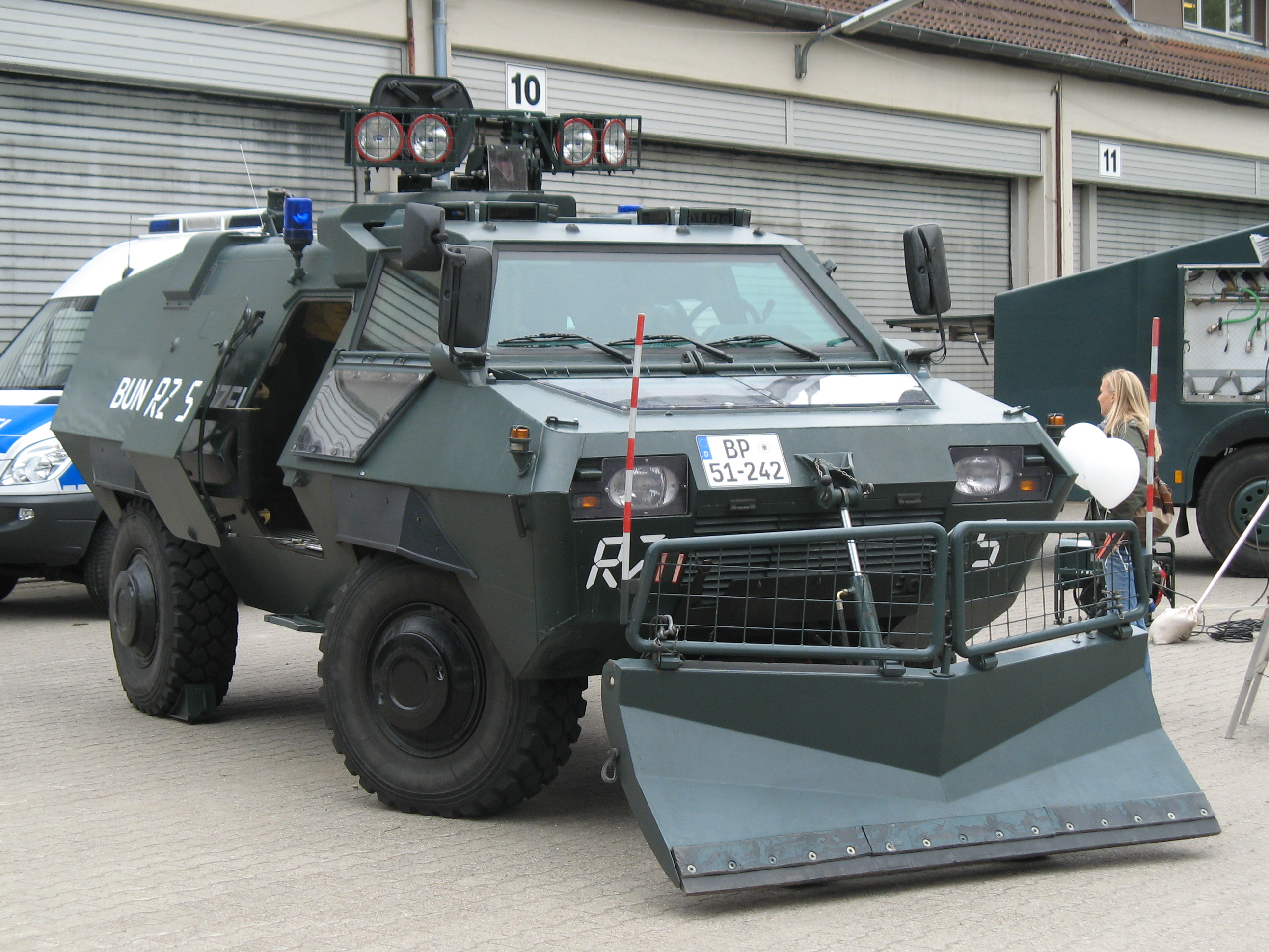
- TM-170 of the German federal police
- Type: Armoured personnel carrier
- Place of origin: West Germany

Service history
- Used by: See Operators

Production history
- Designer: Thyssen-Henschel (acquired by Rheinmetall Landsysteme)
- Manufacturer: Germany: Thyssen-Henschel (acquired by Rheinmetall Landsysteme); South Korea: Hanwha Defense; Shinjeong; Korea Vehicle Corporate
- Produced: 1979
- No. built: 370 (est.)

Specifications
- Mass: 8.8 - 11.9 tonnes
- Length: 6.14 m
- Width: 2.47 m
- Height: 2.32 m
- Crew: 2+10
- Armor: 8mm steel
- Main armament: optional
- Engine: Daimler-Benz OM366 EURO 1 (final production model - 1993); 214 hp
- Suspension: coil sprung portal axles (Unimog)
- Operational range: 870 km
- Maximum speed: 100 km/h (road)

The TM-170 is an armoured personnel carrier was announced for the first time in 1978 and entered production in 1979. It was originally designed primarily for use as an APC or an internal security vehicle, but could be adapted for a wide range of other roles.

The TM 170 was originally developed by Thyssen Henschel which subsequently became part of Rheinmetall Landsystem. Today, the TM-170 is considered a legacy product of Rheinmetall MAN Military Vehicles, part of Rheinmetall's Vehicle Systems Division.

The equivalent vehicle in the current RMMV portfolio is the Survivor R.

== History ==
Around 370 TM-170 were produced in total. The TM 170 was selected by the German Border Guard (Bundesgrenzschutz) and state police forces to replace the old MOWAG MR 8 series of APCs, designated the SW1 and SW2. The TM 170 was designated the SW4 (Sonderwagen 4 for Special Vehicle 4), the SW3 being the armoured version of the Mercedes-Benz G-Class. The first order for 87 vehicles was placed in July 1982 with deliveries running from 1983 onwards.

The TM-170 is mainly used by Public Order and Crowd Control Police (Bereitschaftspolizei) of the state police forces and airport security enforcement of the Federal Police (Bundespolizei). The former Bundesgrenzschutz which was renamed into Bundespolizei in 2005 had a total of 121 TM 170, but these have now been phased out of service.

== South Korean production ==
South Korean companies Doosan Infracore Defense Products BG (Note: Hanwha acquired DIDP in 2015 and it currently markets the Barracuda.) (an affiliate of Hyundai), Shinjeong , and Korea Vehicle Corporate (Note: The company is also known as KOVICO) offer near-copies of the TM-170. It is not clear what, if any, licensing arrangements exists between Rheinmetall and Doosan/Shinjeong/Kovico. Doosan offers the Barracuda, while Shinjeong offers the S-5, and Korea Vehicle Corporate offers the Black Shark.

South Korean-made APCs are in service with Indonesia, Malaysia, South Korea and Vietnam.

== Design ==
The TM-170 is based on Mercedes-Benz Unimog chassis and components. The hull of the TM 170 is of all-welded steel providing protection from small arms fire and shell splinters.

The vehicle is modular, and can be fitted with the following optional equipment: auxiliary heater, fire warning and extinguishing system, hydraulically operated 5,000 kg capacity winch with 40 m of 13 mm diameter cable, public address system, police flashing lights, radio, NBC filtering system and run-flat tyres. As well as the standard version a fully amphibious version was developed and marketed, but none are thought to have been sold.

Armament on the TM-170 is optional and it is capable of being equipped with a pintle- or ring-mounted 7.62 mm machine gun, a turret armed with twin 7.62 mm MGs, or a turret armed with a 20 mm cannon.

== Operators by version ==
=== Thyssen Henschel ===
- Austria: Federal Police.
- Egypt: Reported to have 25 TM-170s.
- Germany: Formerly used by German law enforcement. Used by the Bundesgrenzschutz.
- Iceland: Icelandic Association for Search and Rescue operates two TM-170s that were given by the Federal Government of Germany in 2001 for use in high wind rescue missions and are stationed in two of the windiest places in Iceland, Akranes and Öræfi. They are named "the dragon" and "the taliban".
- Kuwait
- Luxembourg: Used by the Grand Ducal Police.
- North Macedonia: According to the United Nations Arms Transfer lists, Germany transferred 115 TM-170s to Macedonia in 1999 and another 105 in 2000. These are deployed under the local name of the Hermelin (Stoat/Ermine in English). Around 100 of these are thought to remain serviceable. Most used in anti-insurgency operations. Modifications include a PKT or a NSV machine gun turret. Known to be used by Special Task Unit "Tiger" and the Army of North Macedonia.

=== Hanhwa Defence ===
- Indonesia: 25 Barracudas to be sold by 2024 to the Indonesian National Police.
- Iraq
- Lebanon: 10 Barracudas donated with South Korea, which were previously used by the Dongmyeong Unit taking part in the UNIFIL mission.
- South Korea

=== Shinjeong Development ===
- Indonesia: 21 S-5s exported in 2004 for €EUR5 million. 31 anti-riot vehicles for the Indonesian National Police in 2007 for €EUR4.7 million.
- Malaysia: 4 S-5s exported in 2008 to the Royal Malaysian Police for US$2 million.
- South Korea: Used by South Korean troops in 2004 in Iraq. Two S-5s purchased by Korean National Police Agency.
- Vietnam: In service with the People's Public Security of Vietnam with the Cảnh sát cơ động (Mobile Police) for anti-riot duties.

=== Korea Vehicle Corporate ===
- Indonesia: Exported to Indonesia in 2012, 2022, and 2024.

== Gallery ==
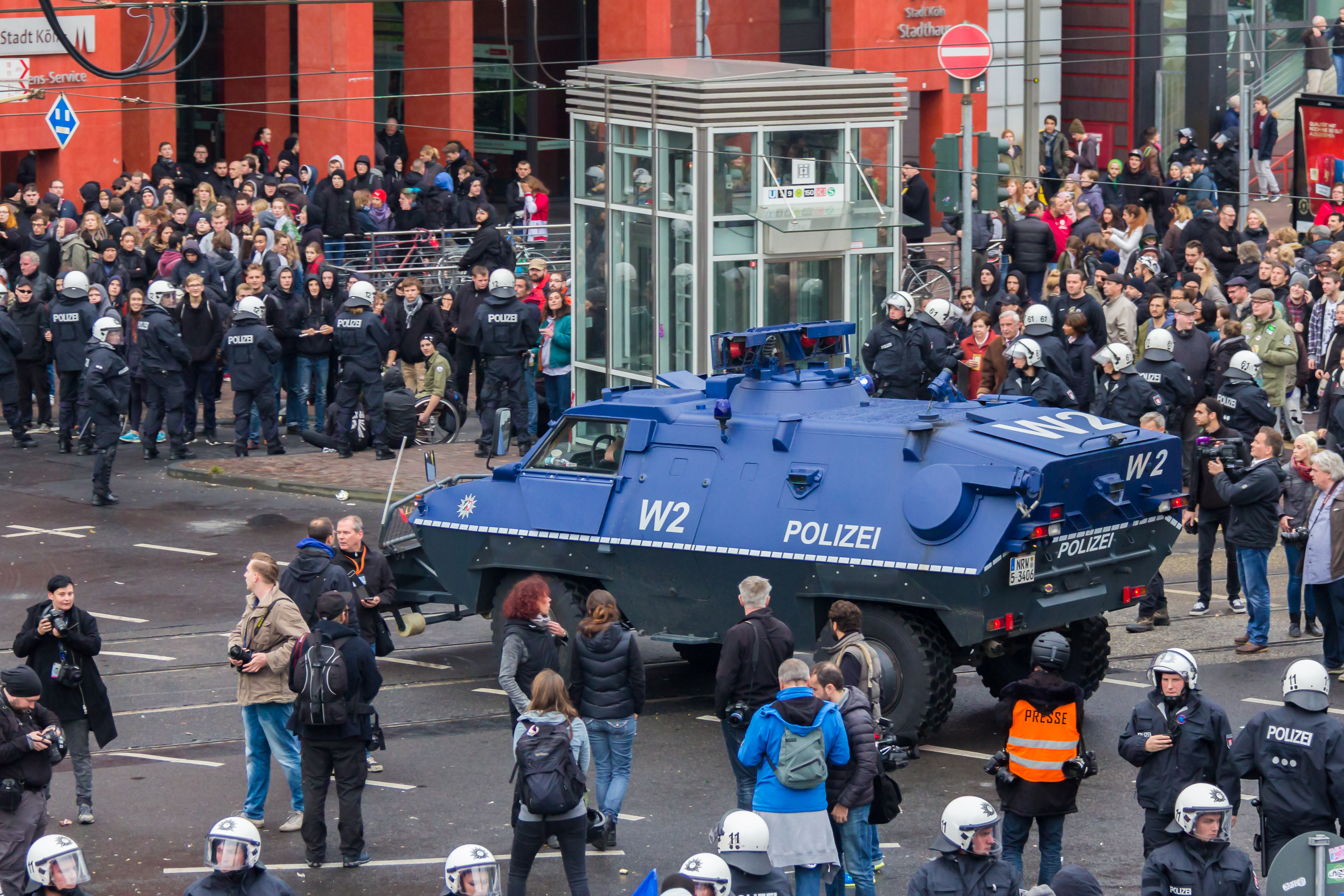
TM-170 of North Rhine-Westphalia Police

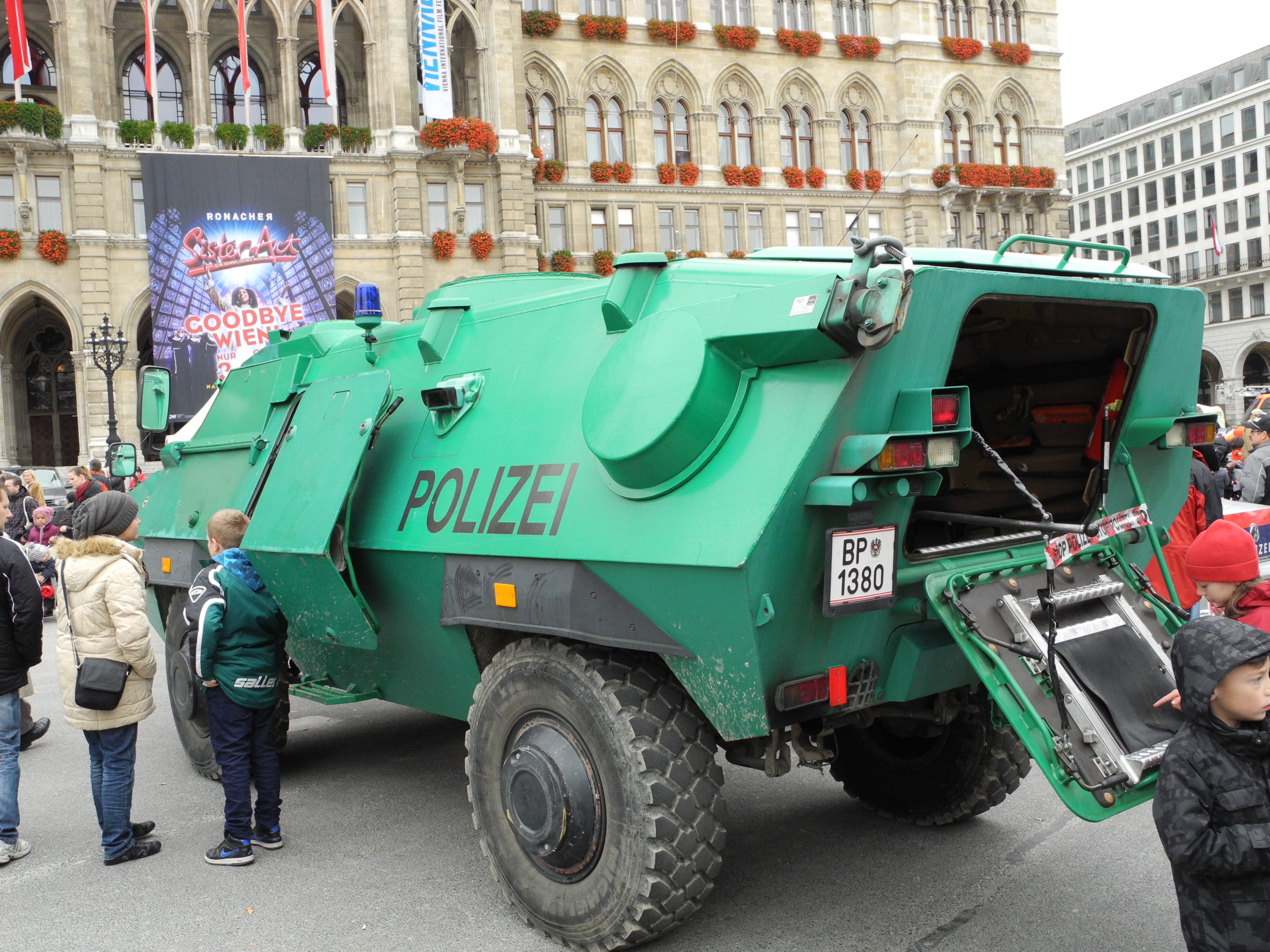
TM-170 of Austrian Federal Police

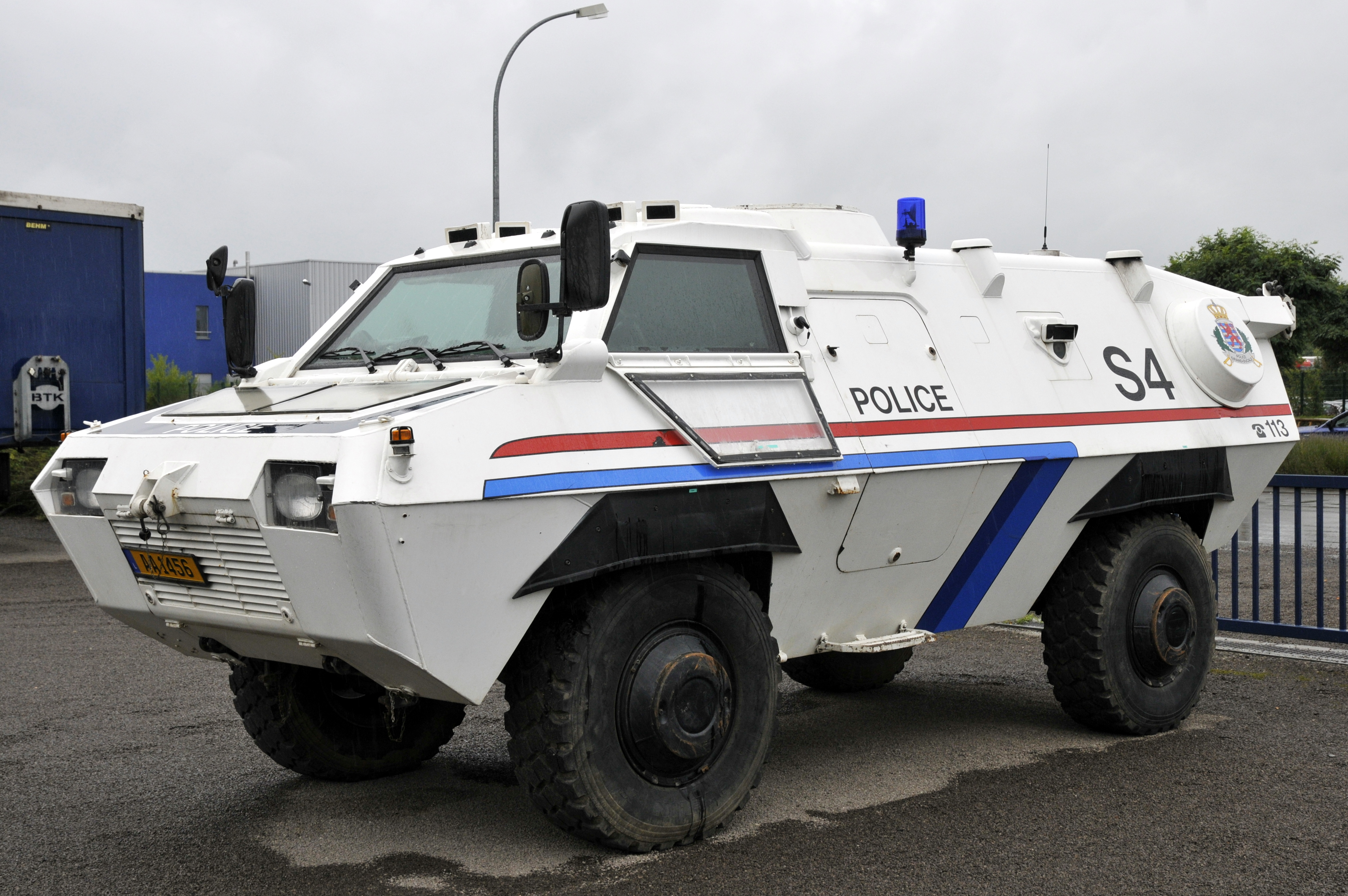
TM-170 of Luxembourg Grand Ducal Police

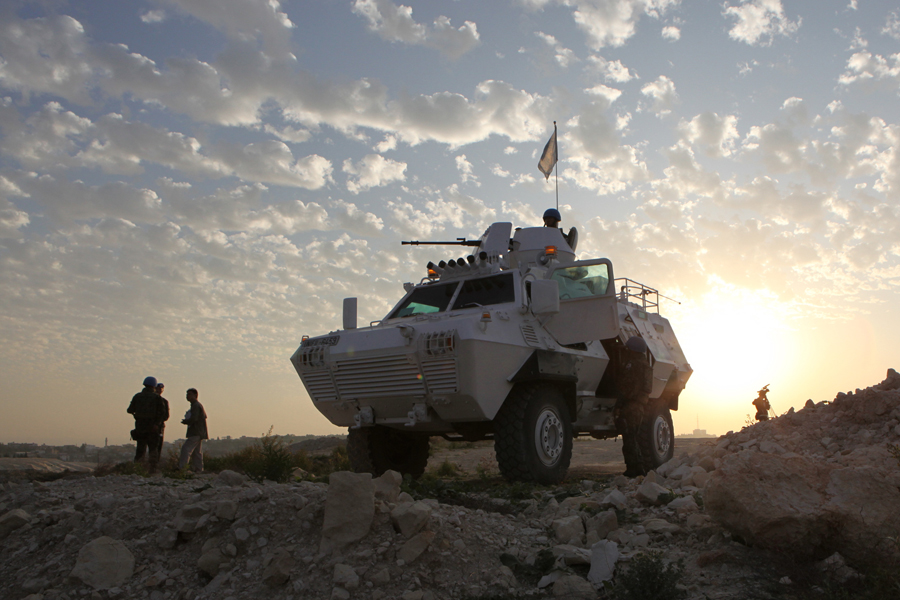
Korean Dongmyeong Unit TM-170 in Lebanon

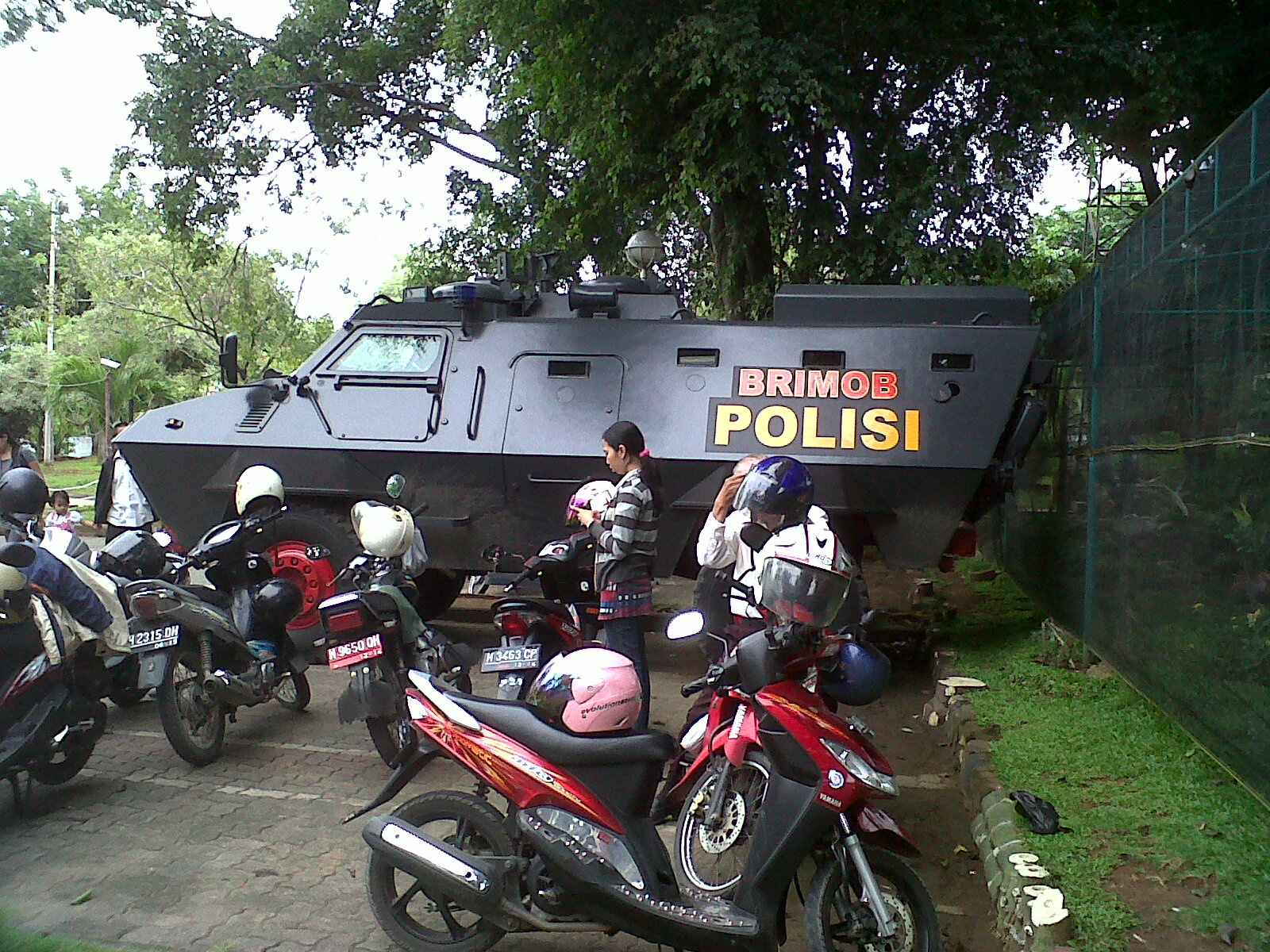
TM-170 of the Mobile Brigade Corps of the Indonesian National Police

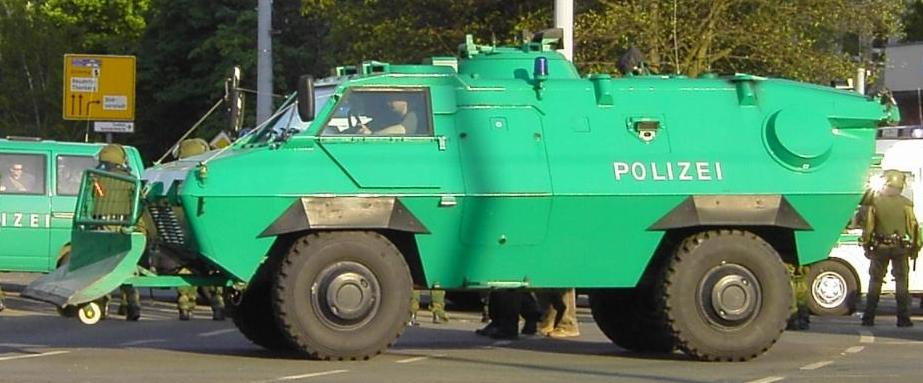
A TM-170 in use with the German police
