= Vae (name) =

Vae, DeVae or Vaé may refer to the following people:

- Vae Kololo, Samoan rugby football player
- Magalie Vaé (born Magalie Bonneau in 1987), French singer
- English name of Xu Song (singer), Chinese musician in pop music
