= Thyssen Henschel =

- Industry: arms industry
- Predecessor: Rheinstahl Henschel
- Founded: 1976
- Defunct: 2000
- Successor: Rail: ABB Henschel (later Adtranz) in 1990; Defense: Rheinmetall Landsysteme in 2000
- Headquarters: Germany

Thyssen Henschel was a German industrial firm and defense contractor. The company was created in 1976 when Thyssen AG renamed Rheinstahl Henschel AG to Thyssen Henschel, having acquired Henschel's owner Rheinstahl.

The rail vehicle construction business of Thyssen Henschel was combined with ABB's corresponding department in 1990 and became ABB Henschel, which in turn was merged into Adtranz in 1996.

The defense part of the company, Henschel Wehrtechnik, was acquired by Rheinmetall in 1999 and was integrated into Rheinmetall Landsysteme GmbH in 2000.

== Products ==
- TAM medium tank for Argentine Army
- Sedena-Henschel HWK-11 - infantry fighting vehicle for Mexican Army
- TM-170 APC
- Marder (infantry fighting vehicle)
- Sri Lanka Railways M6

== See also ==
- Henschel & Son
- ThyssenKrupp
- Rheinmetall
- Category:Henschel locomotives
- TH-495, 1990s unbuilt light combat vehicle
