= Geser =

Geser may refer to:

- Geser/Gesar from the Epic of King Gesar
- Geser F-250 4x4, fire-fighting vehicle from Switzerland
- Geser, Indonesia, a village on the southeast coast of Seram Island
- Geser language, a language of Seram Island
- Hans Geser (1947–2025), Swiss sociologist
- Geser, a fictional character in the series of novels of Russian author Sergei Lukyanenko, starting with Night Watch

== See also ==
- Geyser
- Gezer
