= MH4 =

MH4 may refer to:

- Monster Hunter 4, video game
- Saurer MH4, military vehicle
- MH_{4}, a type of metal hydride
- MH4, a sub-classification of the H4 classification in Paralympic cycling
