= Saurer M6 =

Saurer M6 6x6 Saurer M8 8x8
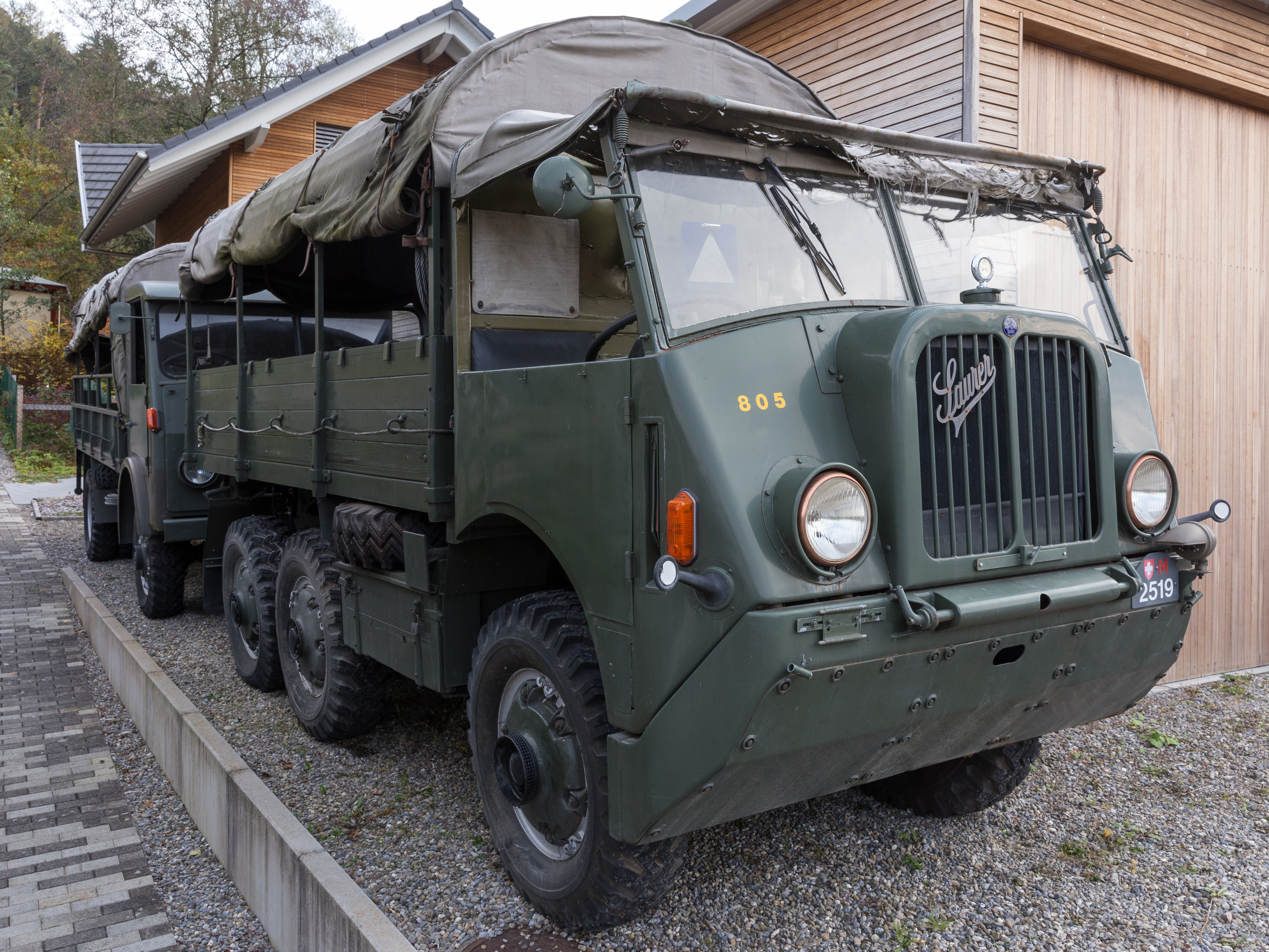
- Swiss Army Saurer 6M
- Place of origin: Switzerland

Service history
- In service: 1940 - ?
- Used by: Switzerland

Production history
- Designer: Adolph Saurer AG
- Manufacturer: Saurer
- Produced: 1940 -?
- No. built: M6 338, M6 radiotruck 16 / M8 79
- Variants: M6 Flatbed truck, M6 radiotruck, M8 Flatbed

Specifications
- Mass: M6 6900kg / M8 7400kg
- Length: M6 5,44m / M8 5,88m
- length: M6 2,25m+1,1m /M8 1,1m+1,57m+1,1m (wheelbase)
- Width: 2m
- Height: 3m
- Crew: 1+ 2Pax in cabin + 20 on the Flatbed
- Engine: M6 Saurer, Typ CTDM 6 Cylinder / M8 Saurer, Typ CT 1 DM 6 Cylinder; M6 85PS, 63kW / M8 100PS / 73,5kW
- Payload capacity: M6 2500 kg /M8 3500kg
- Transmission: Saurer 4 C
- Suspension: 6DM 4x4 / 10DM 6x6 wheeled
- Fuel capacity: M6 90 L/ M8 2x75 L
- Maximum speed: 50 km/h

The Saurer M6 (also called Saurer M6 M) is a 6x6 truck model, which established the Adolph Saurer AG in 1940. The payload of 2.5 tons.

The Swiss Army ordered 338 Saurer M6s in 1940; an additional 16 came with solid construction as radio trucks. Almost identical was the 8x8 model Saurer M8 M, inclusive the prototype 79 M8 trucks were built. Many components of the Saurer M6 also found use in the Saurer MH4. The Saurer 2DM replaced in 1978 the Sauer M6 in Military service, some of them found a second use by the Civil defense of Switzerland.

== Preserved examples ==
A Saurer M6 radio car is now in the Flieger-Flab-Museum (Air Force Museum) at Dübendorf. Normal transporter versions are now in the Zuger Depot Technikgeschichte and the Schweizerische Militärmuseum Full.
