= GMC AC 454 =

Berna GMC AC 454, 4x4
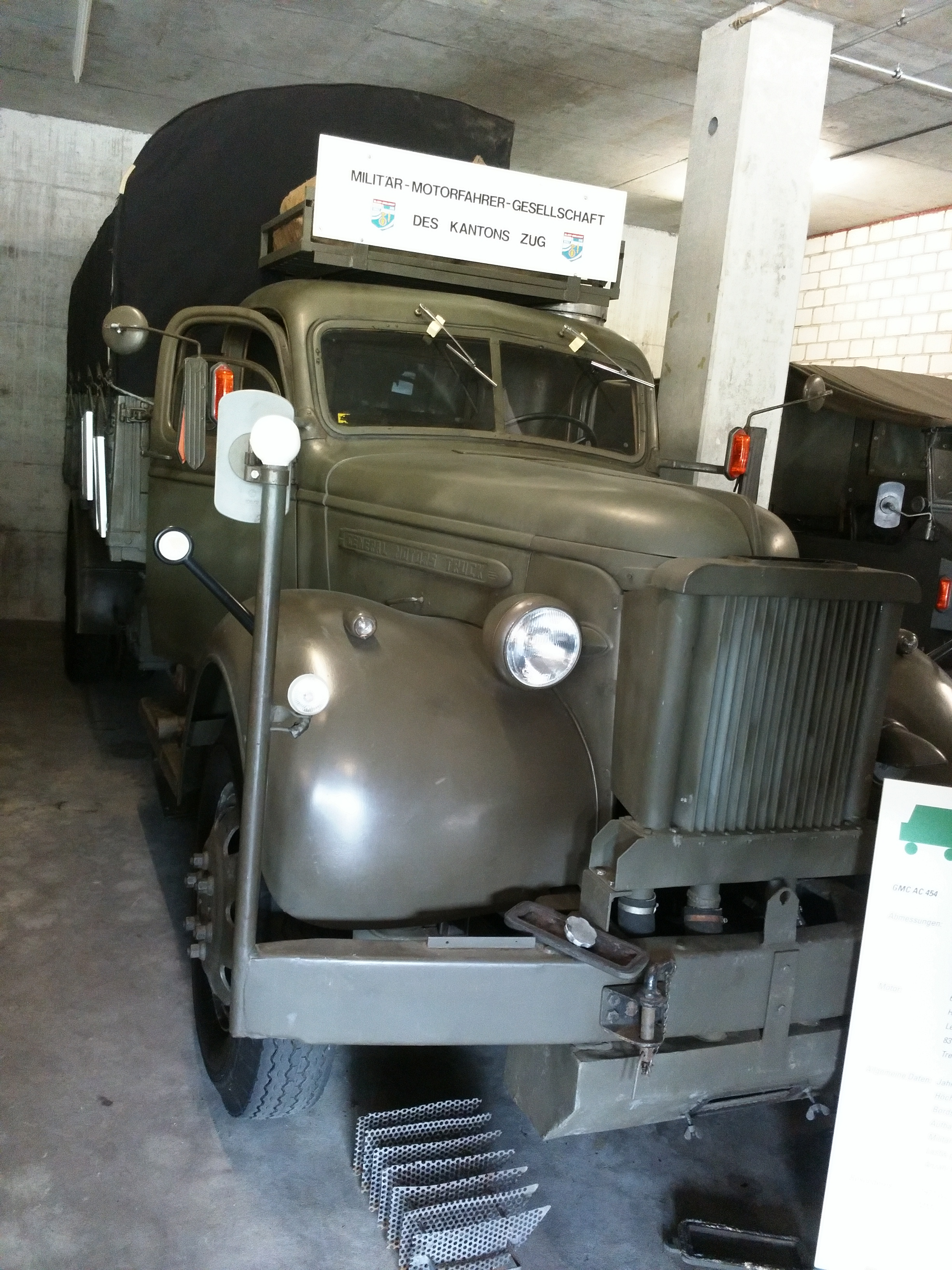
- Swiss Army GMC AC 454 with Wood gas
- Place of origin: USA Switzerland

Service history
- In service: 1940 - 1971
- Used by: United States, Switzerland and others

Production history
- Designer: General Motors
- Manufacturer: General Motors
- Produced: 1940 -?
- Variants: Flatbed truck

Specifications
- Mass: 3700kg
- Length: 7,21 m
- Width: 2,20 m
- Height: 3,10 m
- Crew: 1+ 1Pax in cabin
- Engine: Berna 6 Cylinder 4416 cm³ 55Hp Wood gas / 83 Hp with Petrol
- Payload capacity: 2900 kg
- Suspension: 2x4 wheeled
- Maximum speed: 66 km/h

The GMC AC 454 is a truck model that the GMC manufactured from 1940 on.

== Technical data and history ==
The GMC AC 454 is a military truck build by the General Motors Company in the USA. It was used in World War II. The truck has a bridge construction. It has an onboard voltage of 12 volts. In the Swiss army the GMC AC 454 received the designation Lastw. Gl 3.5T 4x2 (off-road truck with 3.5t payload). The Swiss army used about 90 of these trucks. In 1971 a few GMC AC 454 were rebuilt by Pius Lang from the "Military-Motorfahrer-Gesellschaft des Kantons Zug" with Wood gas generator. The Wood gas generators were mounted on civilian trucks during the Second World War. Such a rebuilt GMC AC 454 is now located in the Zuger Depot Technikgeschichte (Zug depot of technical history).

== Pictures ==
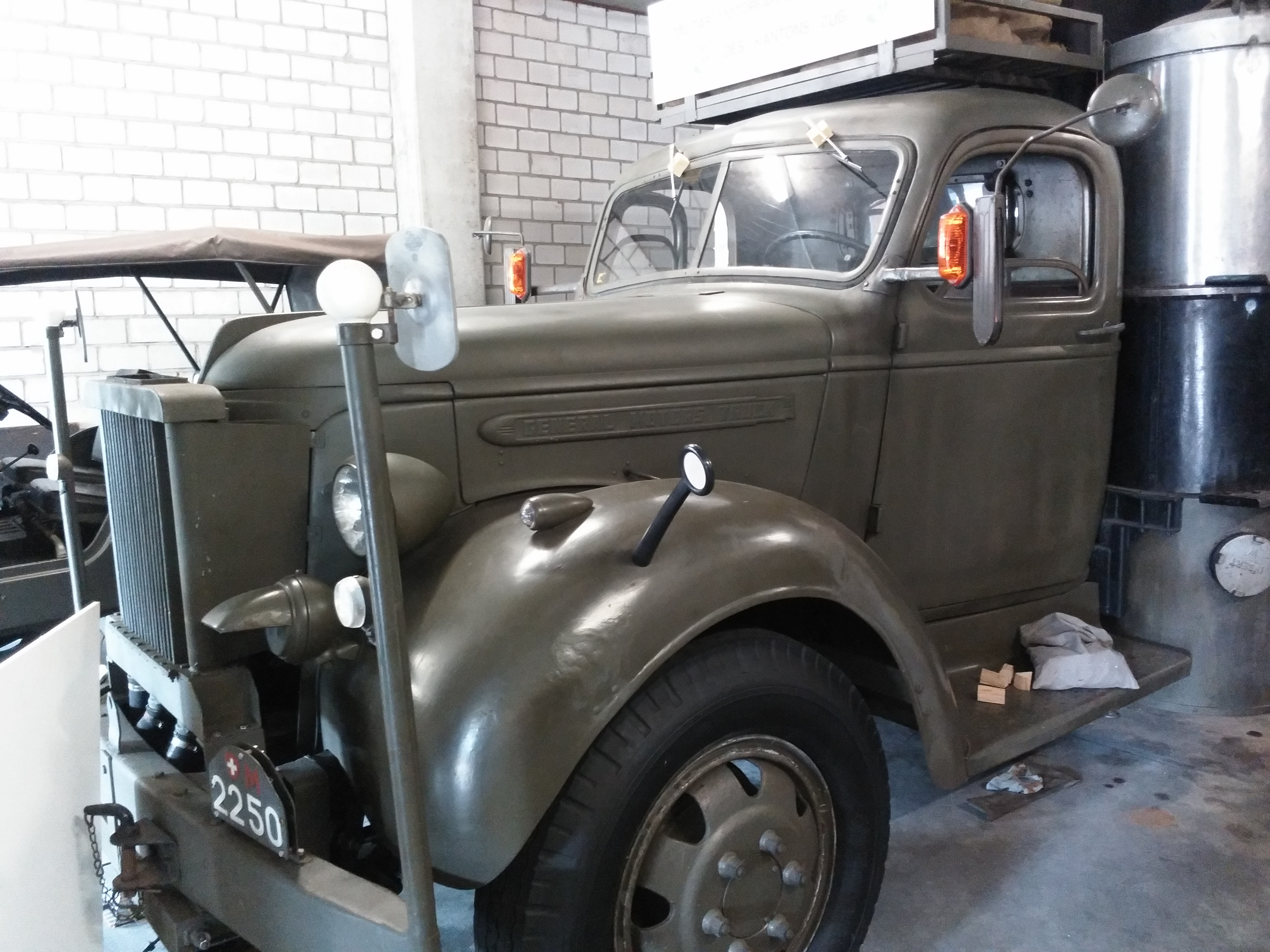
GMC AC 454 – Side

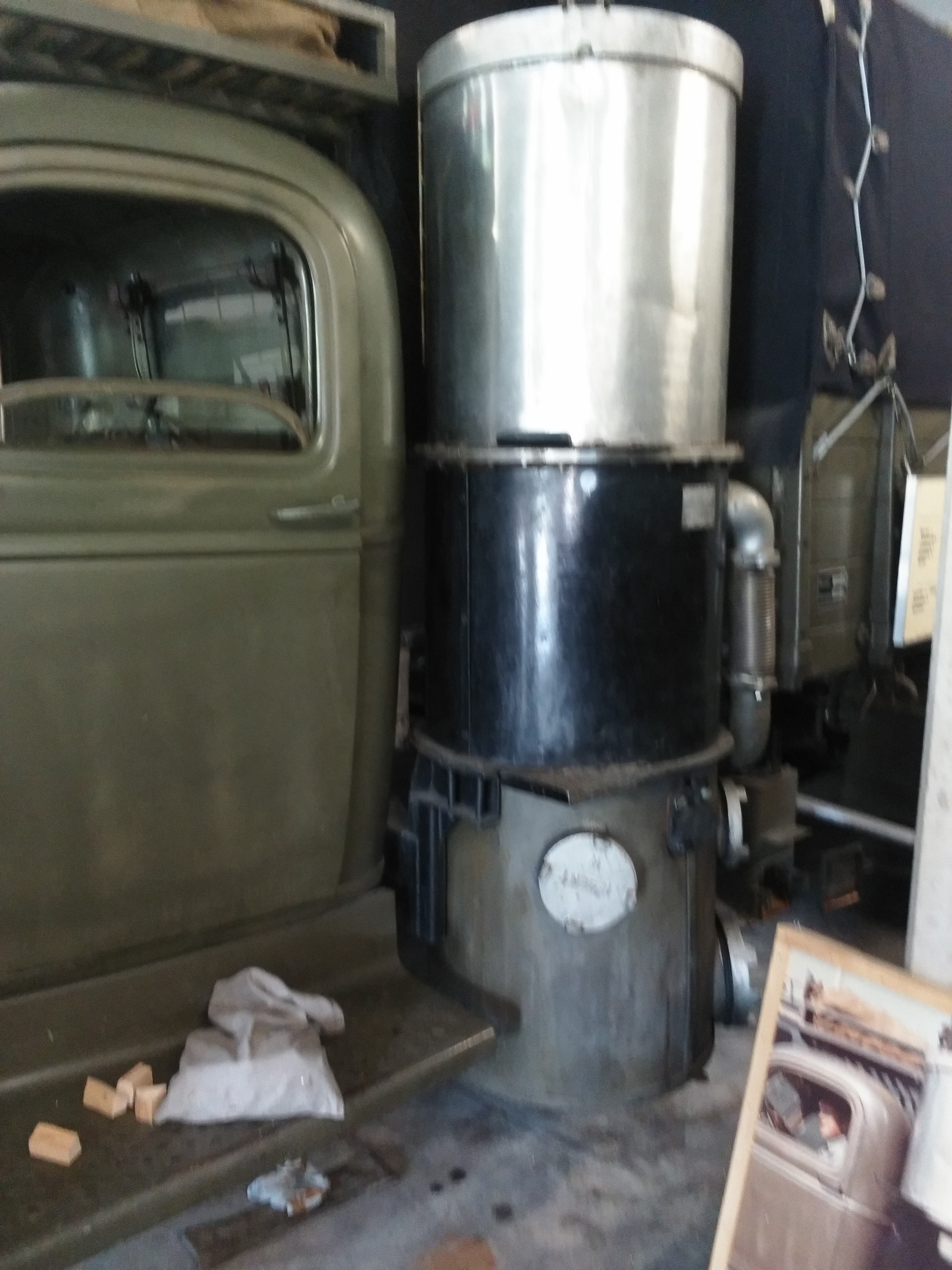
GMC AC 454 – wood gas installation

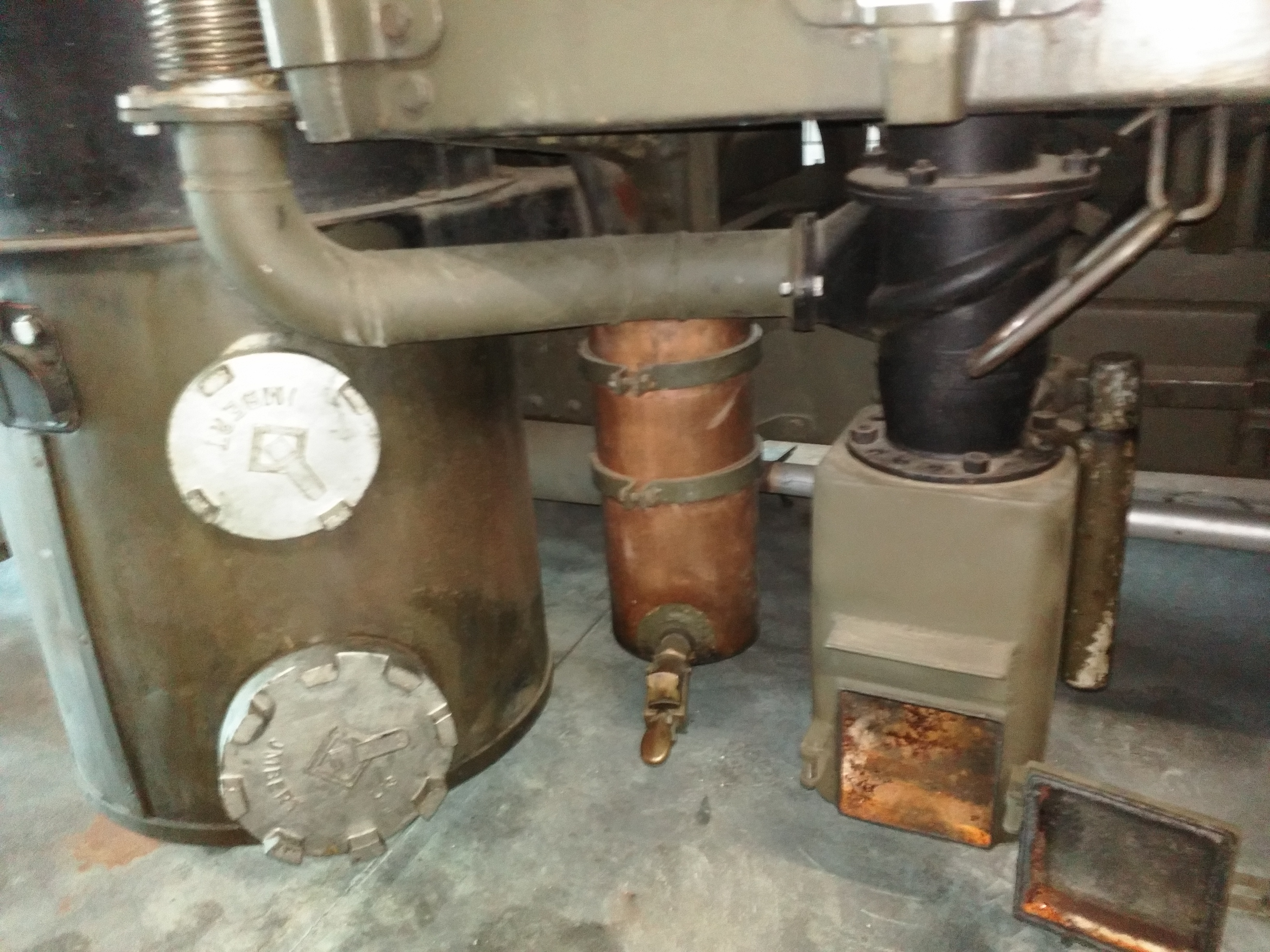
GMC AC 454 – wood gas installation, Detail
