= Militärhistorische Stiftung des Kantons Zug =

Swiss foundation

Coordinates: 47.1724°N 8.5182°E

The Militärhistorische Stiftung des Kantons Zug MHSZ (Foundation of Military History of the Canton of Zug in English) is a foundation consisting of a group of Military Museums in the canton of Zug with the purpose of safeguarding and cultivating the military heritage of the Swiss Confederation in the canton of Zug.

== Activities ==
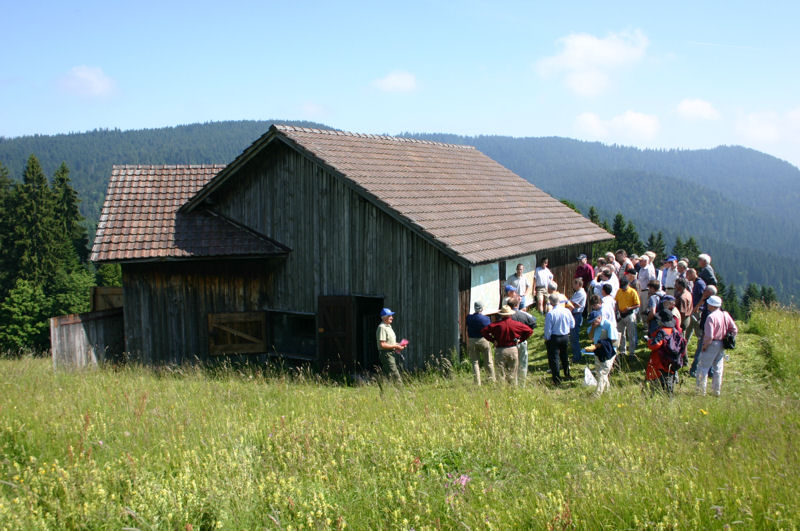
Bunker on Mount Raten

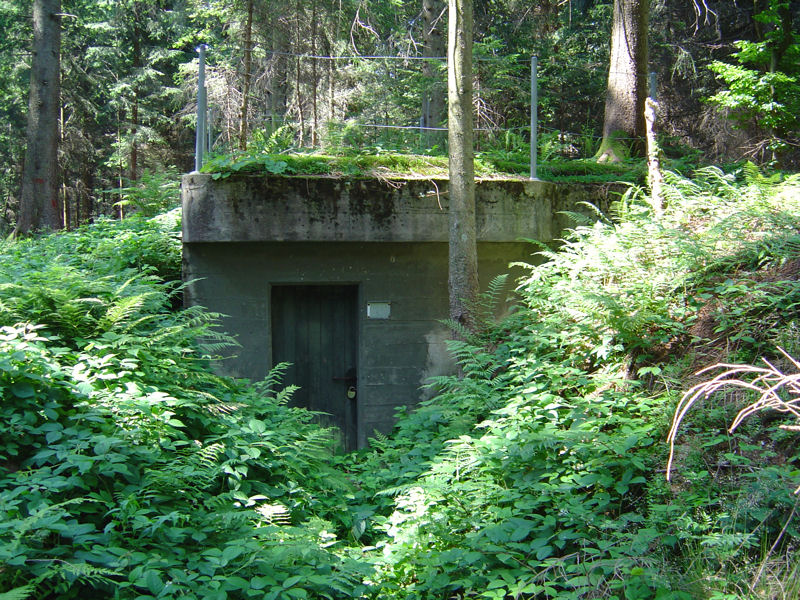
Ground on the Gottschalkenberg

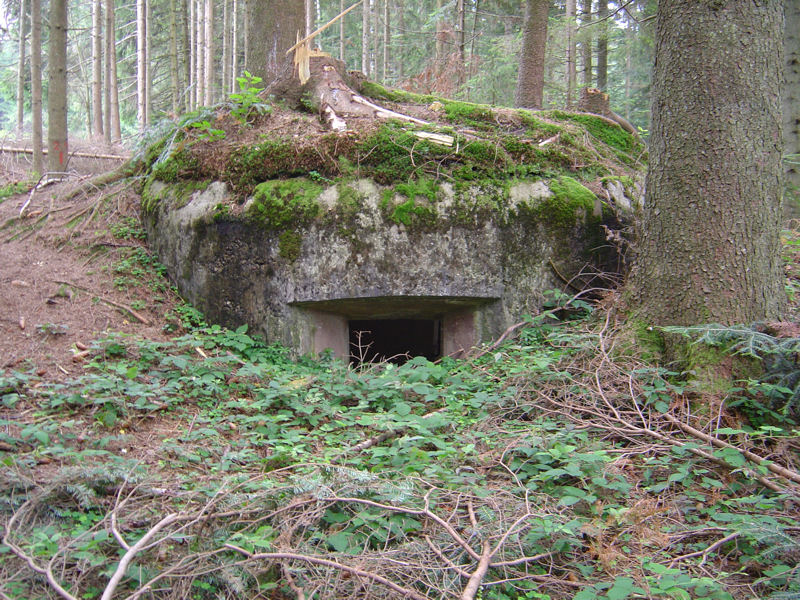
Tank rifle station Schurtannen

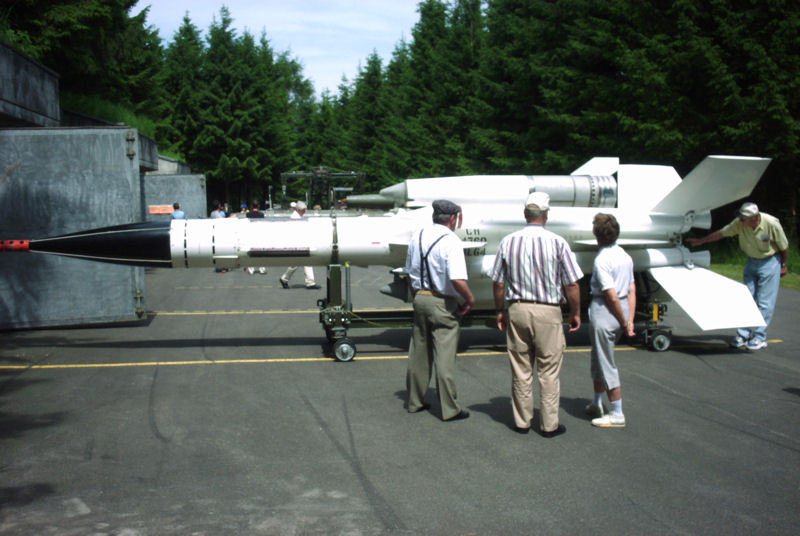
Sightseeing of the Bloodhound, British painting

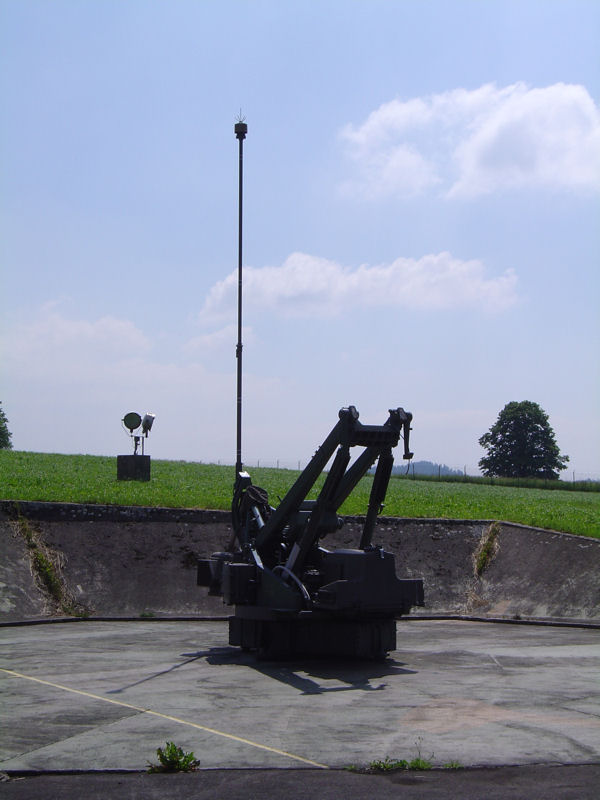
Empty launcher facing north

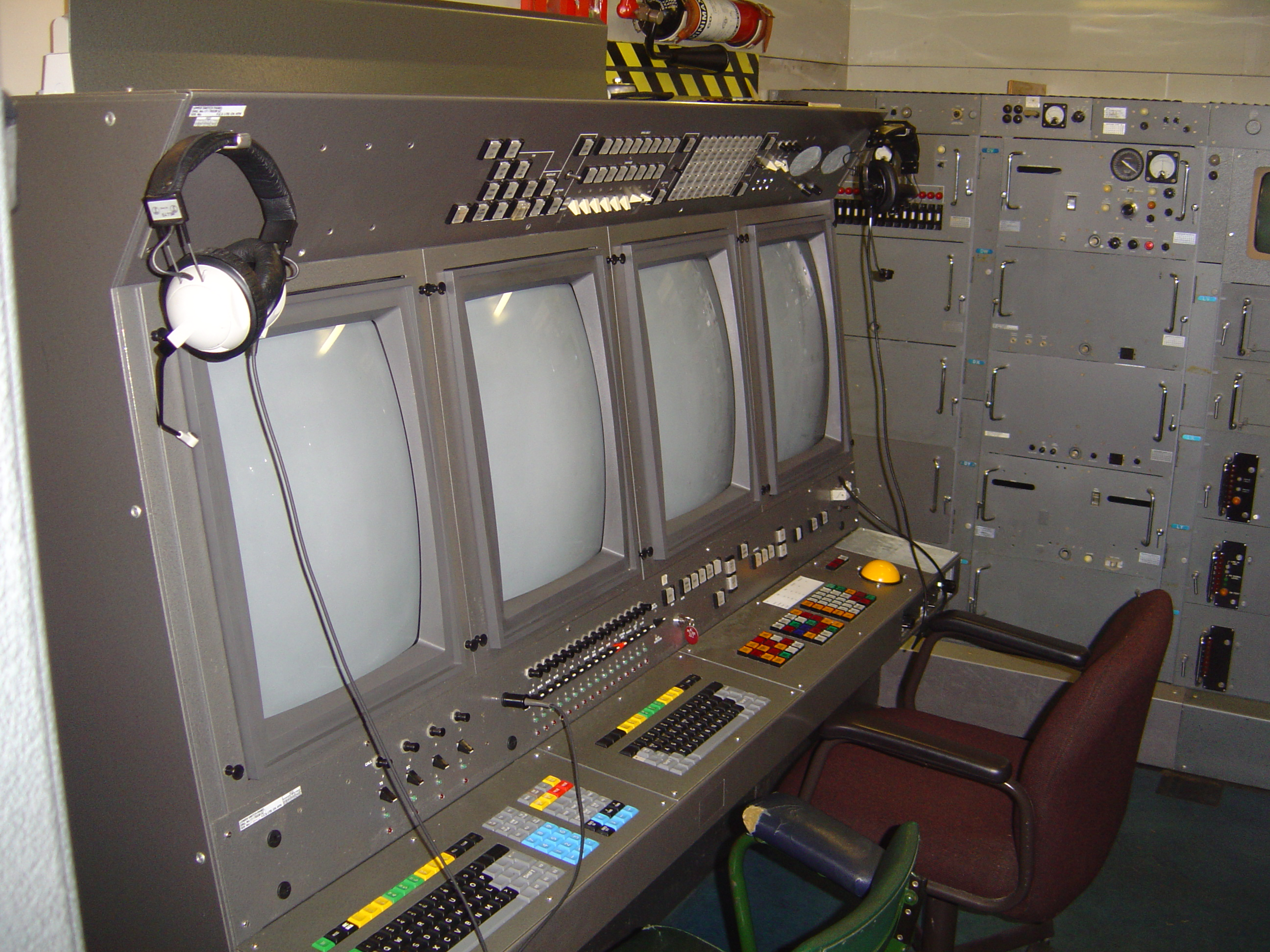
SAM Workstation

The MHSZ secures and maintain the historical remains of buildings from the Second World War and the Cold War in the canton of Zug, making them accessible to historians, scientists, and the public. The MHSZ is concerned with preserving the cantonal and federal military heritage in its broadest sense; acquiring, securing, preserving, and maintaining the fortifications and opening them to the scientific community and the public.

The foundation also manages the Bloodbound museum in the municipality of Menzingen.

== Organization ==
The foundation was established in January 1994 by 25 people as a civil-law institution in accordance with Art. 80 et sqq. of the Swiss Civil Code.

The MHSZ consists of

- The Board of Trustees
- The Fortification department
- The Air Force department
- The external auditors

== Membership of the Foundation ==
The MHSZ is a member of ‘’FORT - CH / Festungen – Schweiz’’, the national umbrella organisation of Swiss civilian fortress organisations, who maintain the fortresses and other infrastructures of the Swiss army and make them publicly available.

== Military heritage of Canton Zug ==
=== Fortresses ===
The MHSZ has now acquired over 35 local fortifications which are preserved and displayed on guided tours. 40 more fortresses are to be acquired.

The acquired fortresses all date from the Second World War and continued operation during the post-war years and were fitted with more advanced arms. These facilities were to be used by the 6th Field Division as part of the Swiss National Redoubt, an attempt to prevent rapid enemy advancement through the pre-alpine part of the canton Zug into the basin of Schwyz, and from there on towards the Gotthard Pass, in the case of an invasion.

The fortifications consist of dragon's teeth and other obstacles e.g. ditches, walls, bunkers fitted with machine guns or Anti-tank weapons, various artillery installations including 7.5 cm and 15 cm caliber weaponry. The inventory of the acquired facilities is as follows:

Objects	number
Machine gun bunkers	16
Anti-tank bunkers	3
Infantry support gun garages	1
Infantry support gun outposts	1
Artillery bunkers and pits	8
Artillery command centres	2
Accommodation	4

=== Bloodhound ===
The MHSZ has acquired the air defense control armament position BL-64 ZG "Bloodhound" in the municipality of Menzingen. The facility can be visited via guided tours. The BL-64 ZG "Bloodhound" is the last of six air defense control armament positions of the British type Bloodhound Mark II, which had been spread across the Swiss Plateau and the Jura Mountains, that is still in good condition. The Bloodhounds had been built for the protection of the Swiss airspace, together with Mirage III combat aircraft and the FLORIDA Airspace monitoring and management system. From the 1960s until the end of the millennium, these three systems had been in service. They have since been replaced by F/A-18 Hornet combat aircraft and the new radar system FLORAKO. The Bloodhounds have not received a successor. The entire facility remains the property of the Federal Department of Defence, Civil Protection and Sport. One of the former two units is under cantonal Cultural heritage management. In the summer several of the eight launchers are equipped with original, but inert missiles. The complete electronic and mechanical facilities are at their original location. The main components of the SAM system are a command center with deployment point, a radar, a power supply with diesel units, the launcher, an underground missile storage, a communication tower and transmission systems. Within the outpost there is a well-developed street network, and the military camp by the entrance is still used by the Federal Department of Defence, Civil Protection and Sport. Today the BL-64 ZG Bloodhound is the last of its kind.

=== Zuger Depot Technical History ===
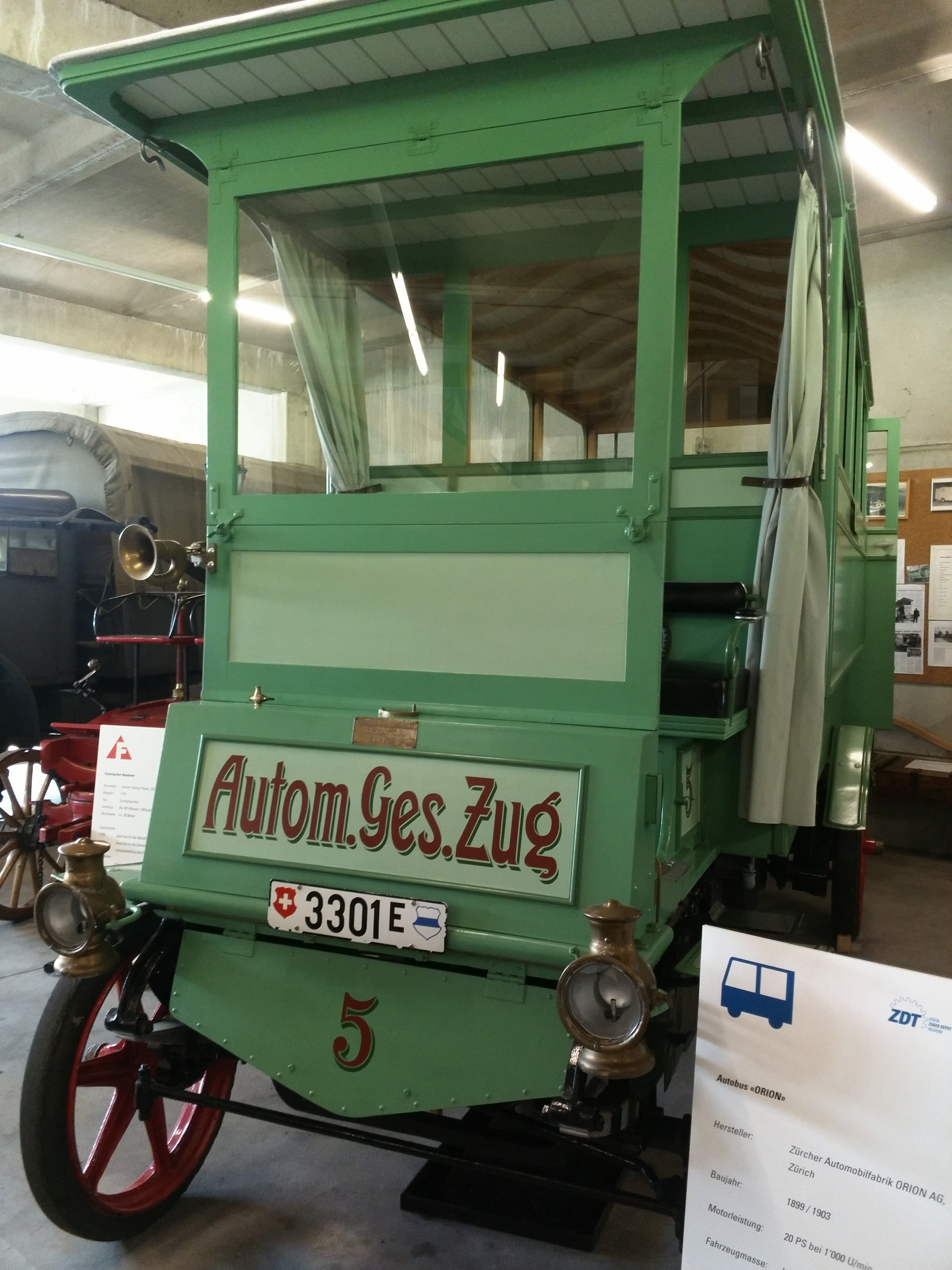
Orion Autobus of 1904

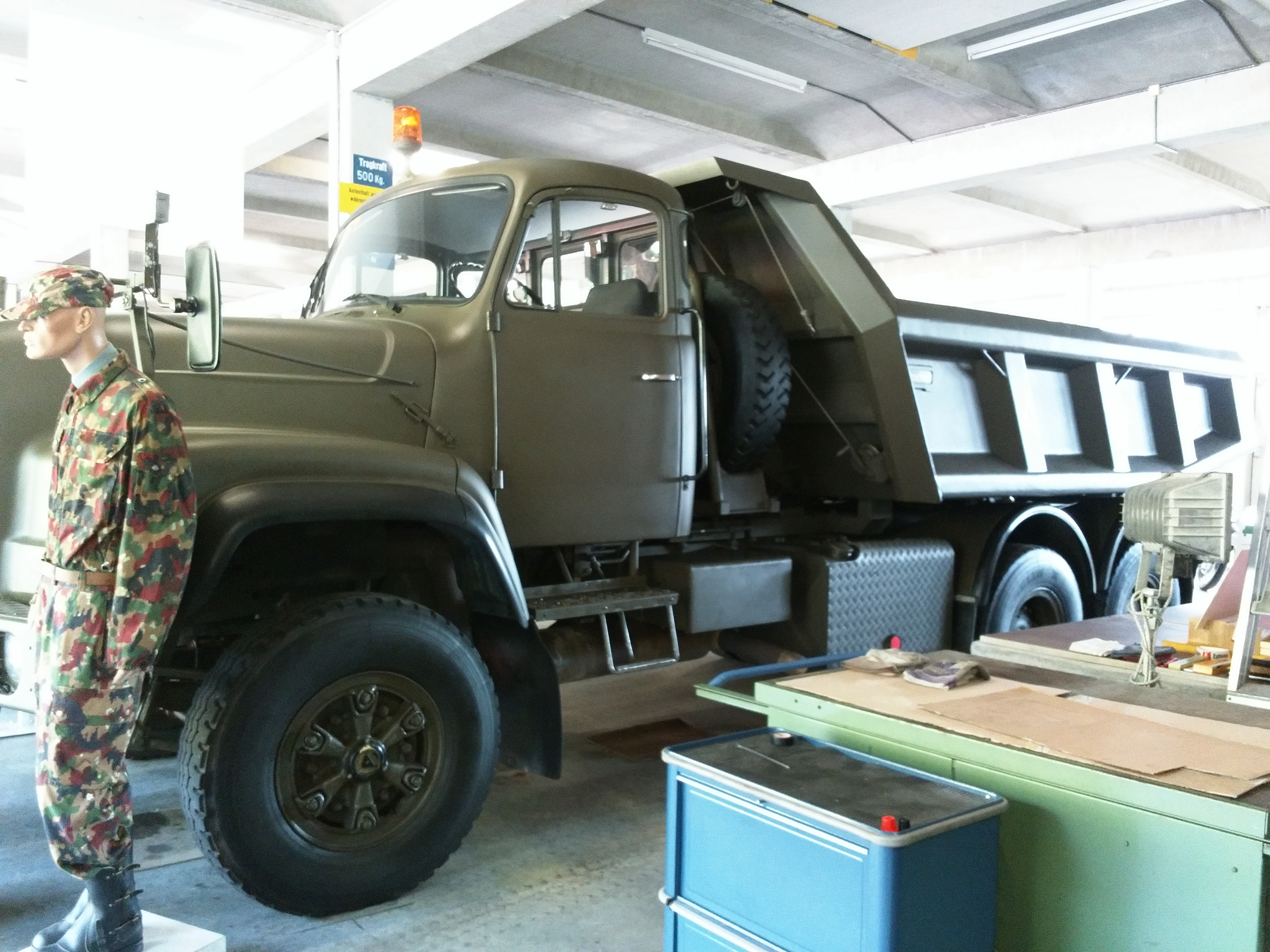
Saurer D330N

The MHSK is a founder and member of the Verein Zuger Depot Technikgeschichte ZDT (English Depot of Technical History of Zug Foundation) in the former Zeughaus Neuheim. The ZDT is interdisciplinary and includes army, fire department and public transport. The MHSZ shows various projects, equipment and weapons of the Swiss Army, with the main focus on infantry, armored personnel, aviation, artillery and armored vehicles. The equipment, guns and armored vehicles are maintained, restored and kept available for guided tours and open days for the interested public by the ZDT. The exhibition includes the following vehicles:

- Saurer MH4
- Saurer M6
- Mowag T1 4x4
- Mowag W300
- Entpannungspanzer 65
- Brückenpanzer 68
- Berna L275/10 Truck from 1937
- GMC AC 454 Trucks of 1940
- Canadian Military Pattern truck
- Saurer D 330 N
- Motor-Gebirgskanone 1938 L22 (7.5 cm MotGeb Kan 38 L22)
- 20mm Fliegerabwehr cannon 1938 (Flab Kan 38) W + F Berne
- Orion Autobus 1904
- Saurer 5 DUK 1965
- APE 4.80 Zugerland Verkehrsbetriebe ZVB passenger trailer
- AGP 3 Zugerland Verkehrsbetriebe ZVB cargo trailer
- Motor vehicle CFe 4/4 "elephant" 1913 of the electric tramway in the canton of Zug (ESZ)
- FBW 91U EU4A
- Flood control Unit Volkswagen Transporter 1961
- ADL ADL 1979
- Reconstruction truck Magirus-Deutz Muni 1957
- SCBA Transporter Geser F-250 4x4
