= Mowag W300 =

Fire fighting equipment

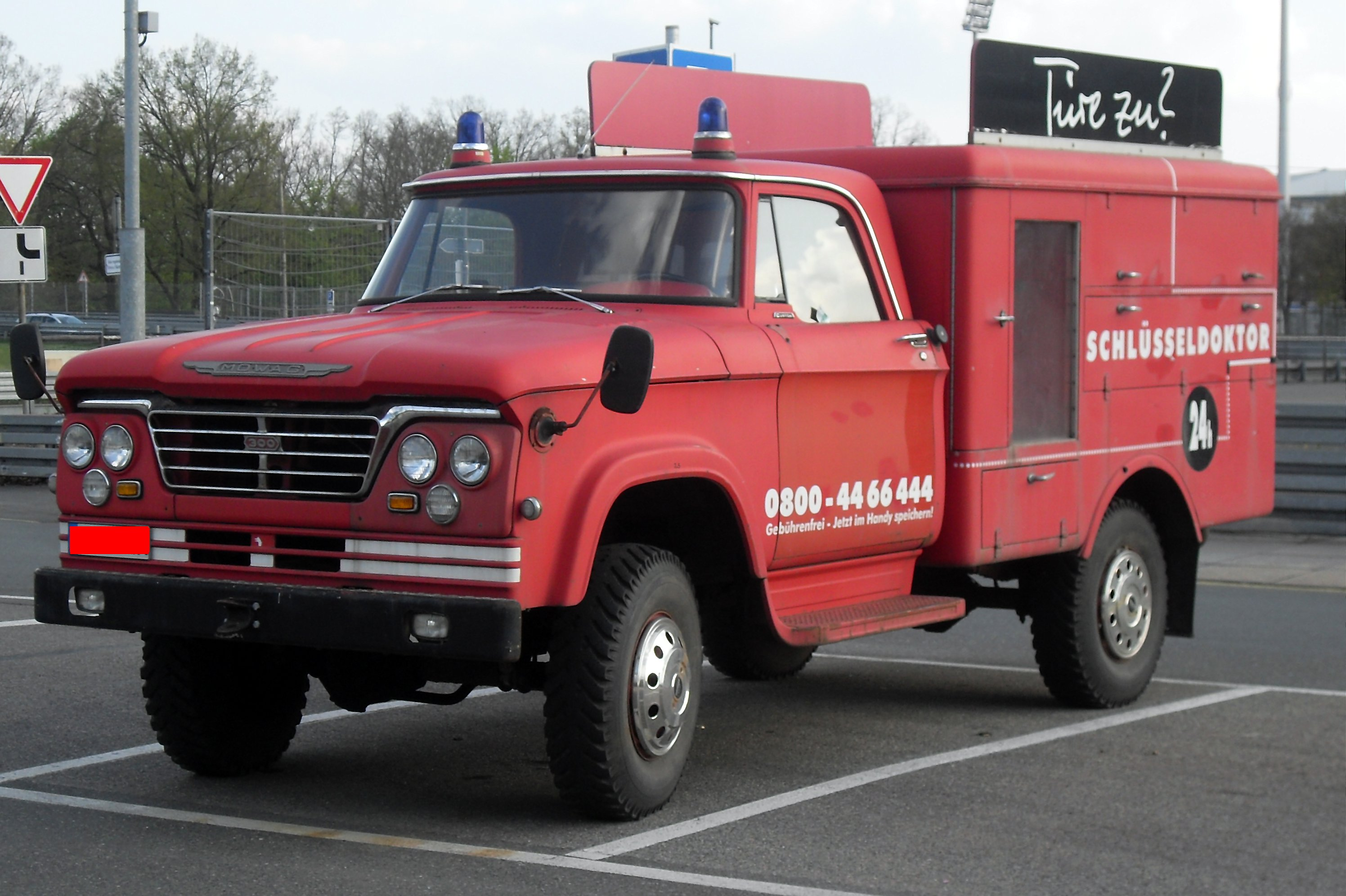
- Mowag W300
- Place of origin: Switzerland

Service history
- Used by: Fire department in Switzerland

Production history
- Designed: 1955
- Manufacturer: Mowag AG
- Variants: delivery van

Specifications
- Mass: 5,100 kg (11,200 lb)
- Length: 5.48 m (216 in)
- Width: 2.35 m (93 in)
- Height: 2.35 m (93 in)
- Crew: 1 driver + 3 in the cab and 4 passengers on the bridge
- Engine: V8 Chrysler Petrol with lead additive 5213 cm³
- Transmission: Borg - Warner 4-speed transmission.
- Suspension: 4×4 wheeled
- Maximum speed: 140 km/h (87 mph)

The Mowag W300 is a fire-fighting vehicle from Switzerland. It is a rebadged variant of the Dodge W-Series trucks.

== History and development ==
Since 1955 fire engines have also been constructed at Mowag in Kreuzlingen in the Canton of Thurgau. Often adapted to Swiss needs. The models W 200 (Feuerblitz = Fire flash), W 300 and W 500 were widely used as first response vehicle or fire engine. The MOWAG W300 was manufactured in 1968 by Mowag. Equipped with a Chrysler Petrol engine with lead additive. The vehicle has all-wheel drive with terrain reduction without differential lock. A trailer hook for carrying, if required, various trailers with firefighters equipment. The tires consist of 6× 7.50 16.8 Ply tires 6-fold (rear twin tires) with a tire pressure of 5.0 bar each. The braking system is based on vacuum-assisted oil brakes. The cabin and the mechanics came largely from the Dodge Power Wagon, the superstructures were individually made by Mowag according to the needs of the respective fire brigades. The Mowag W 300 with 750 kg BC firefighting powder, as well as four hand-held fire extinguishers for the pipe safety device on the bridge, were equipped as a powder extinguishing vehicle. Nitrogen (two pressurized bottles) was used as propellant. As well as two rigid hoses of 30 meters each, left and right as a quick-access means. Some Mowag W300 are still available on auction platforms. Various fire brigades in Switzerland have such vehicles still as oldtimer partys and parades in the inventory. A Mowag W300 of the volunteer fire brigade of the city of Zug in the configuration powderextinguishing vehicle is located in the Zuger Depot Technikgeschichte (Zug depot of technical history).

== Pictures ==
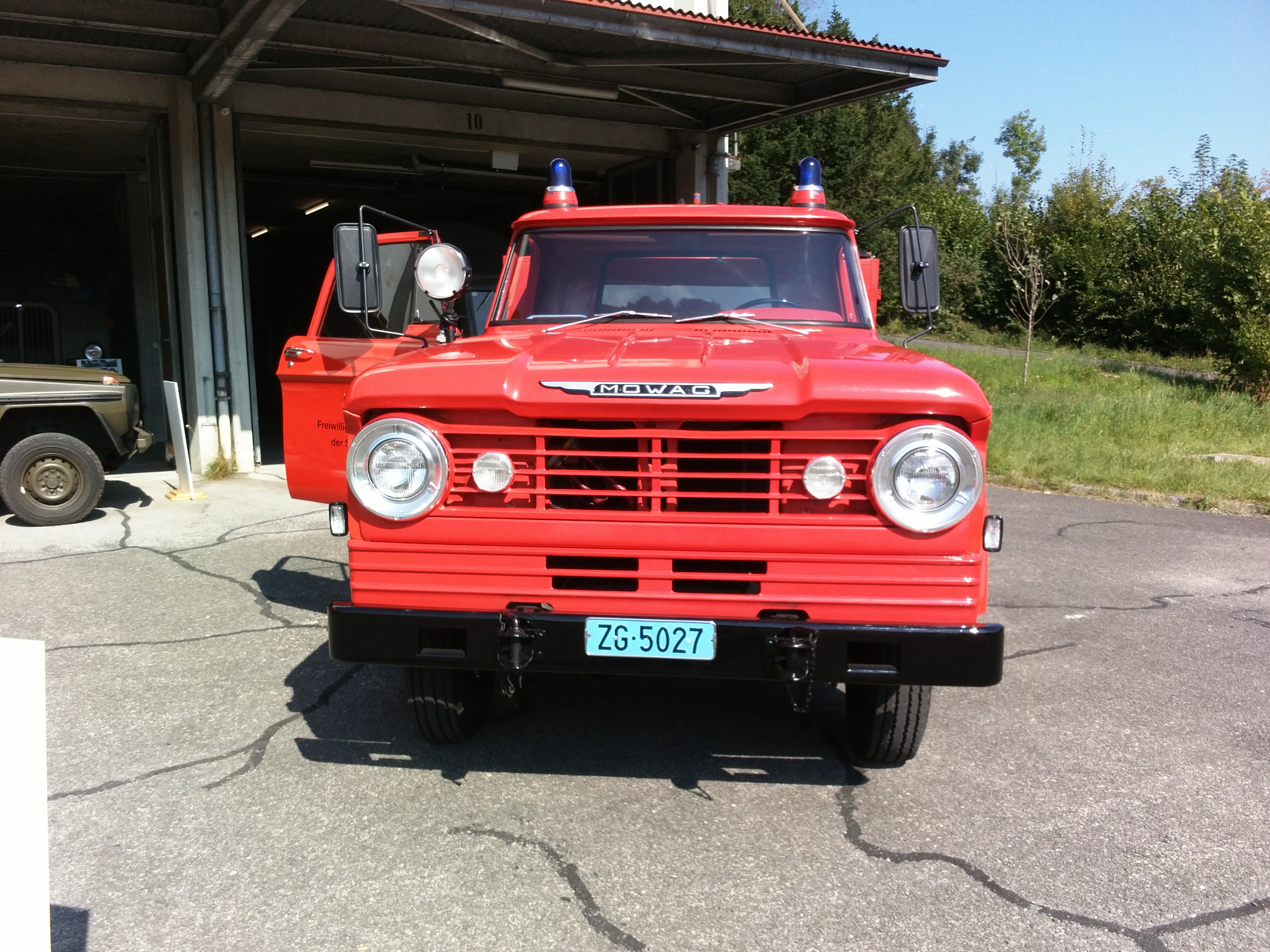
Mowag W300 front

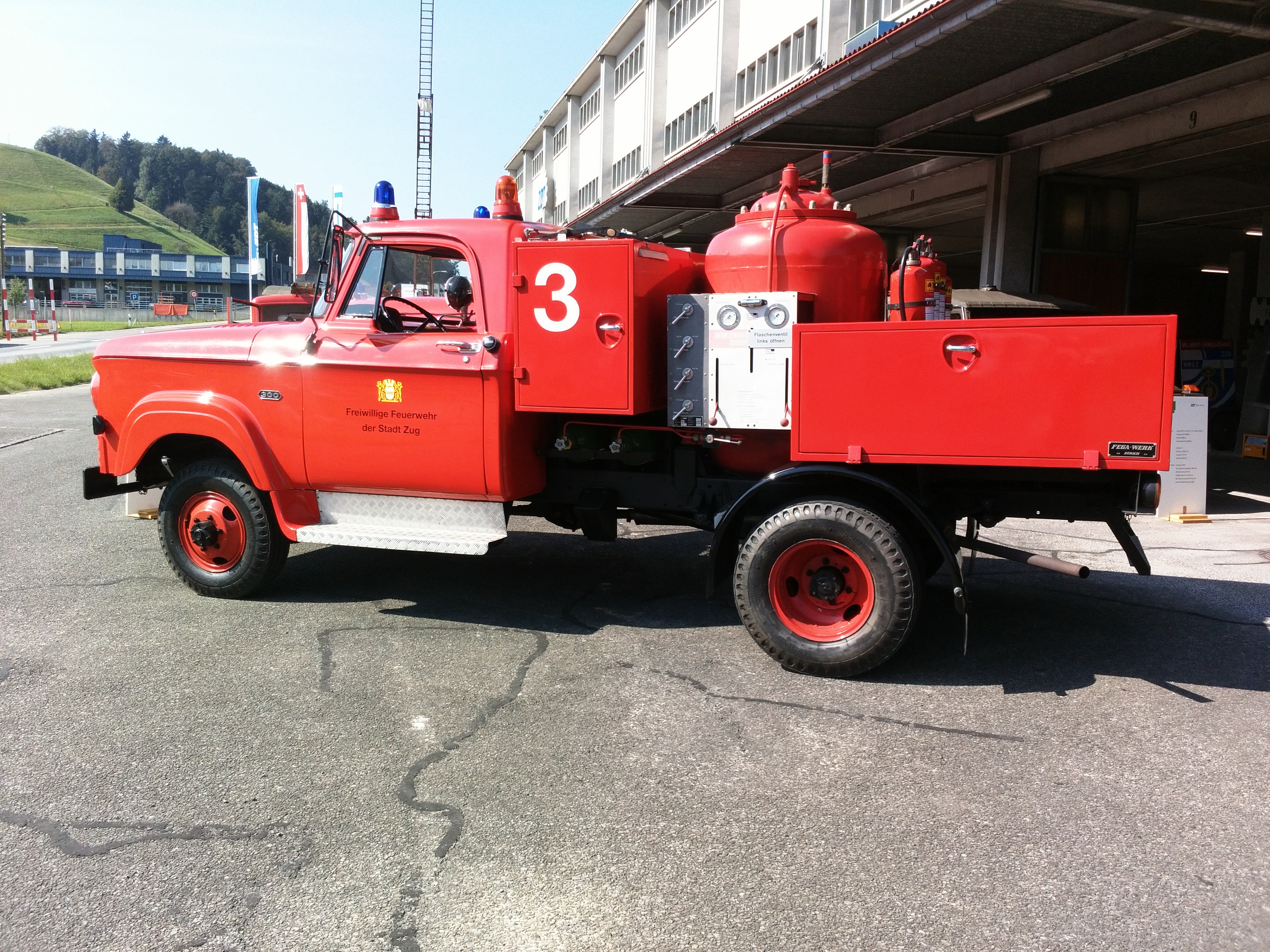
Mowag W300 rear

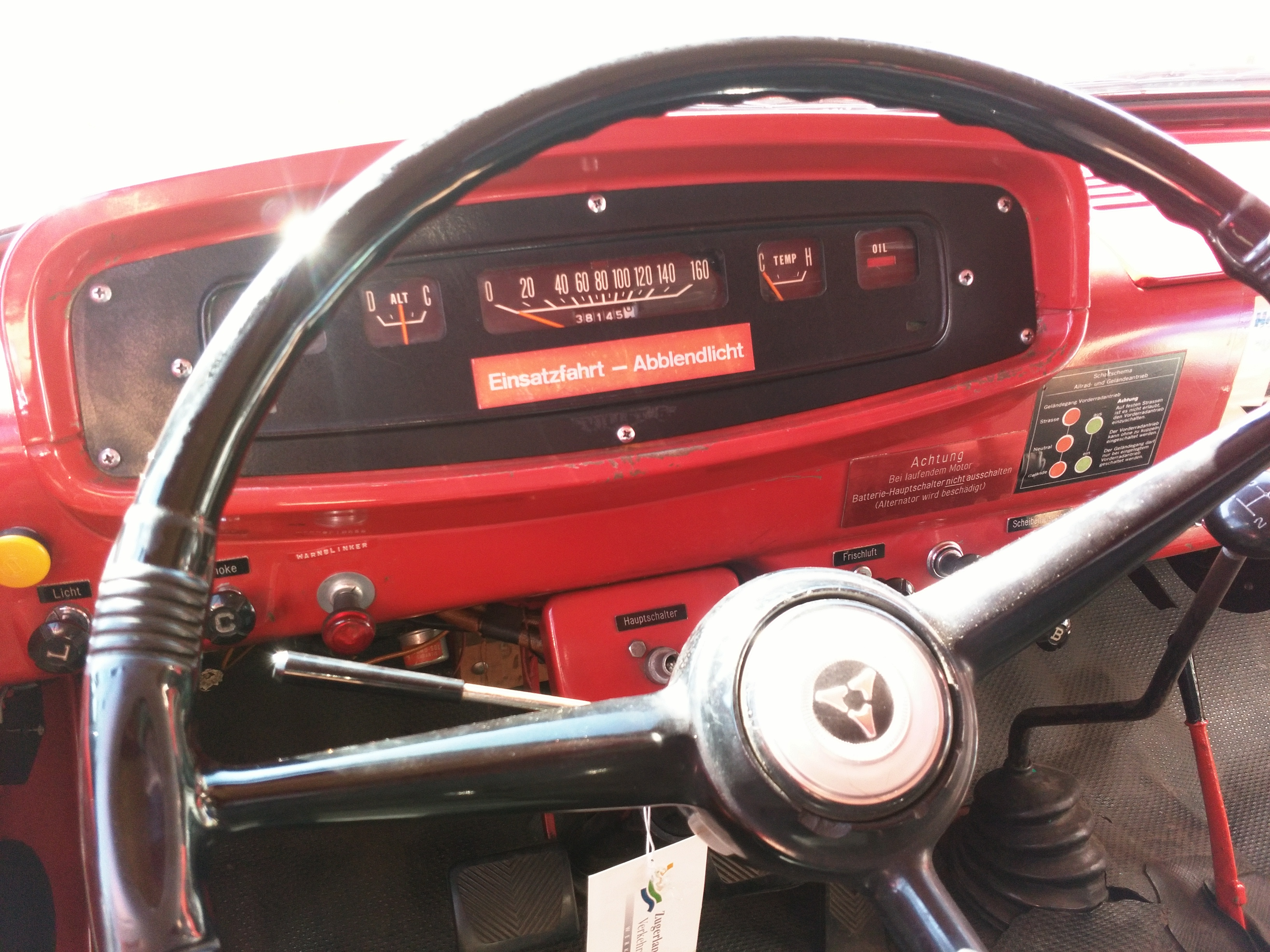
Mowag W300 cockpit

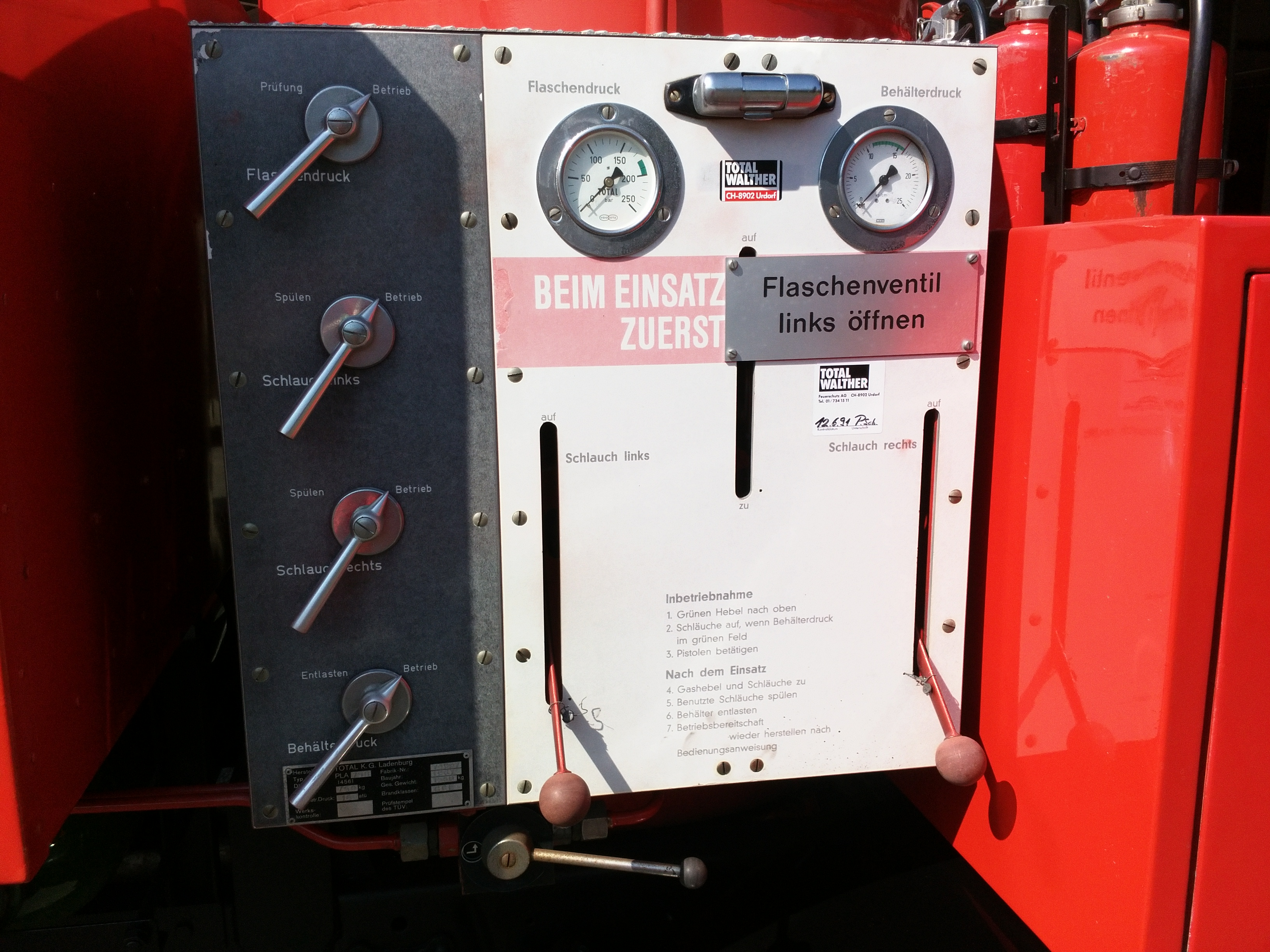
Mowag W300 panel
