= Magirus-Deutz Muni =

Fire-fighting vehicle

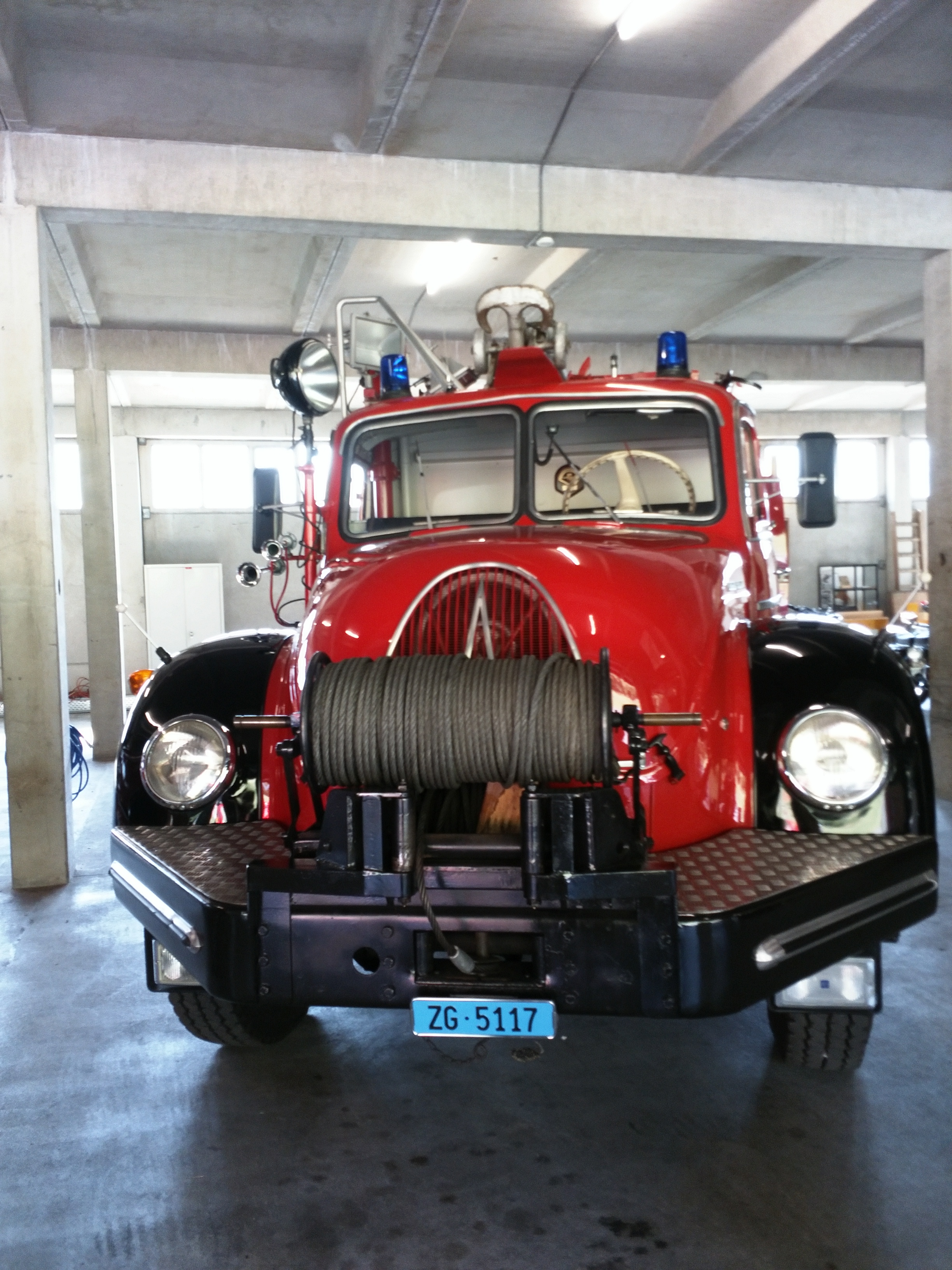
- Magirus-Deutz Muni
- Place of origin: Germany

Service history
- Used by: Fire departments

Production history
- Designed: 1957
- Manufacturer: Magirus-Deutz
- Variants: firefighting cran

Specifications
- Mass: 14,200 kg (31,300 lb)
- Length: 8.3 m (330 in)
- Width: 2.53 m (100 in)
- Height: 3.0 m (120 in)
- Crew: 1 driver + 7 pax
- Engine: V8 Diesel aircooled 125 kW (170Hp)
- Suspension: 4x4 wheeled

The Magirus-Deutz Muni is a fire-fighting vehicle from Germany, which was produced by the Ulmer commercial vehicle manufacturer Magirus-Deutz in only 6 pieces.

== History and development ==
In 1957, the Magirus Deutz "Muni" was manufactured as Fire engine. It has permanent all-wheel drive with compensation, from the driver's seat from lockable (longitudinal differential) terrain reduction and an independently acting transverse differential lock. A trailer hook for carrying, if required, various trailers with firefighters equipment. The tires consist of Firestone 1100R20 16 PR U300 0160F, each with a pneumatic pressure of 7.5 bar at the front and 7.0 bar at the rear. The braking system is based on pure air brakes, equipped with inductor, indirect trailer air pressure brake. The carrying capacity of the DEMAG crane is 7 tons, the rear two support rollers, and a further support can be mounted on the side. The cable winch at the front has a maximum pulling force of 5.0t by means of a scissor pin, a cable length of 60 meters and 100 meters on the additional pulley. At the vehicles tail can be pulled max 5.0t, secured by a slip clutch. The emergency power generator delivers 3x 380/220 V 20 kVA. The light mast can be extended to 8.5 m over terrain with three headlights each 1000 W 7220 V fed by the emergency power unit. The fire brigade Bern used such a vehicle. After they passed it on to the volunteer fire brigade of Zug. This Magirus-Deutz Muni is now located in the Zuger Depot Technikgeschichte (Zug depot of technical history).

== Pictures ==
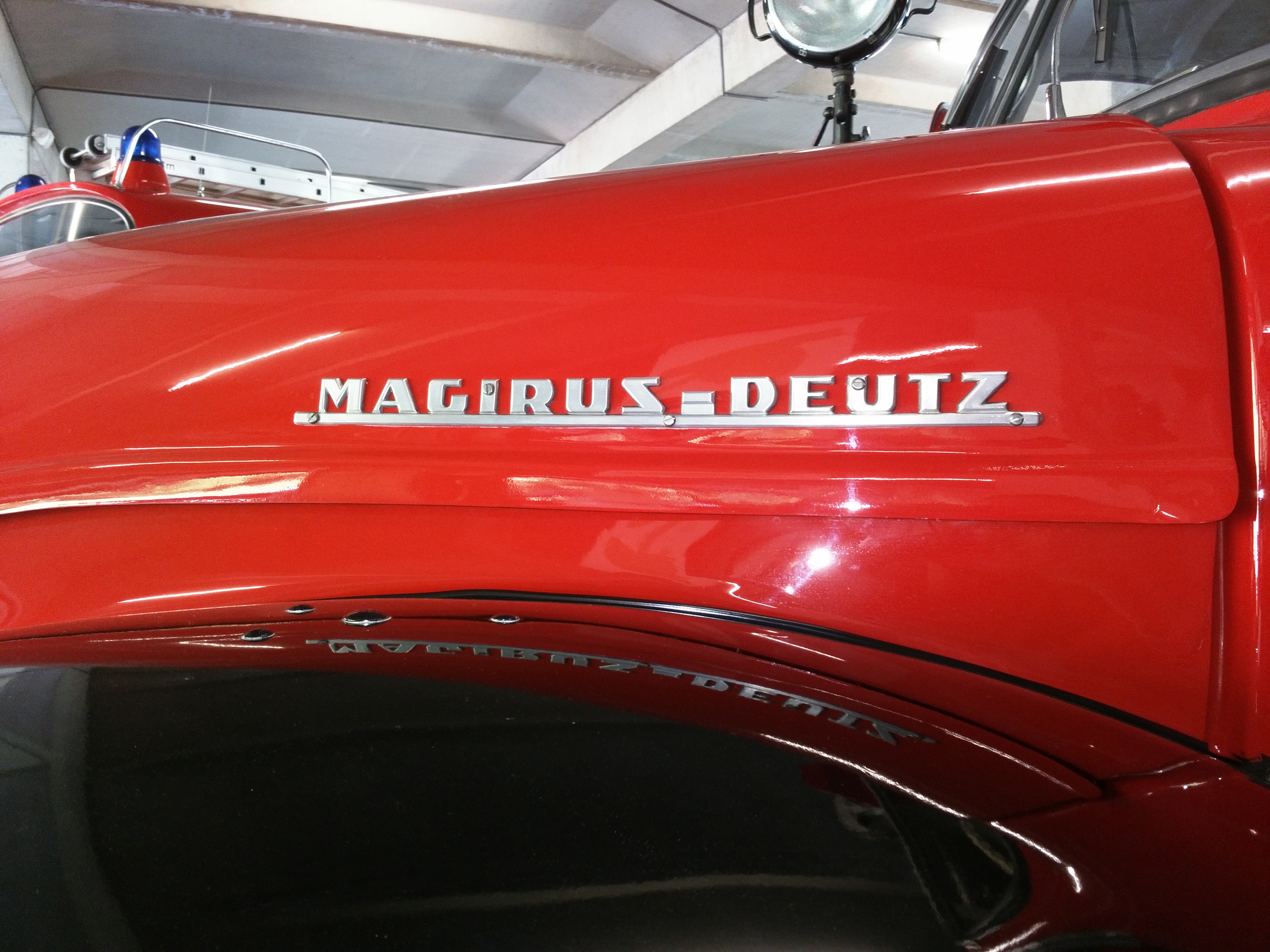
Nametag

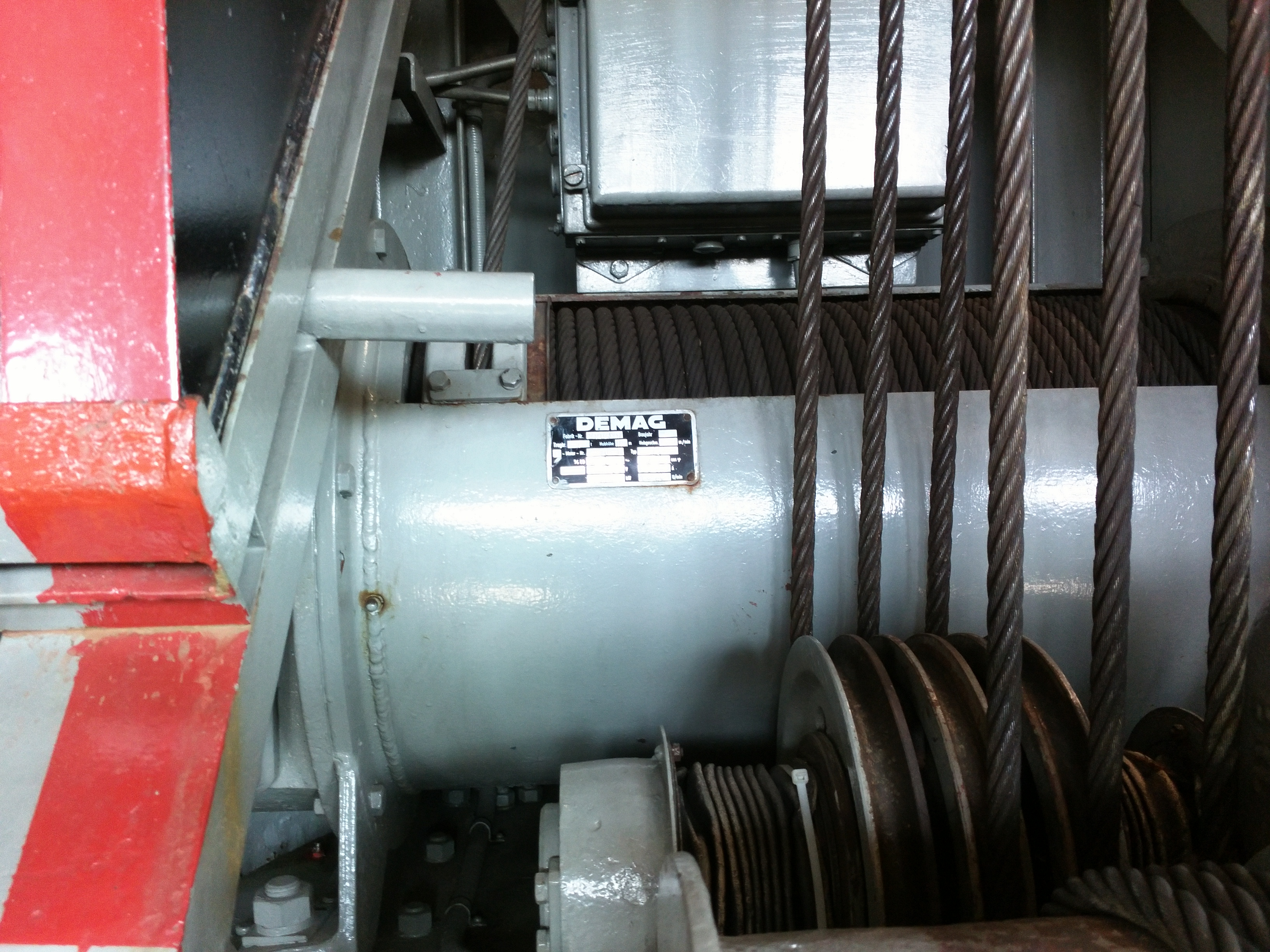
Magirus Deutz Muni winch

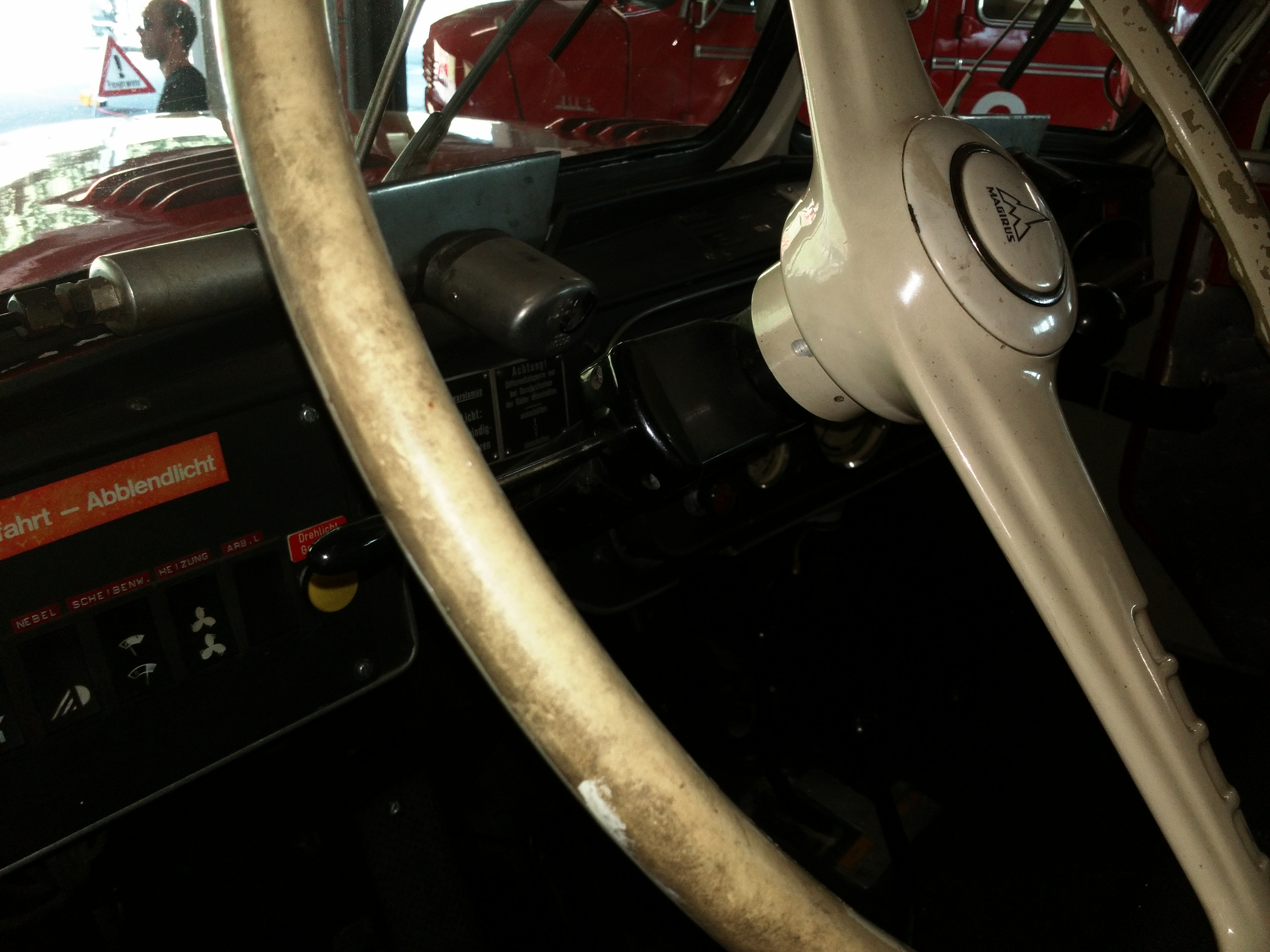
Magirus Deutz Muni Cockpit

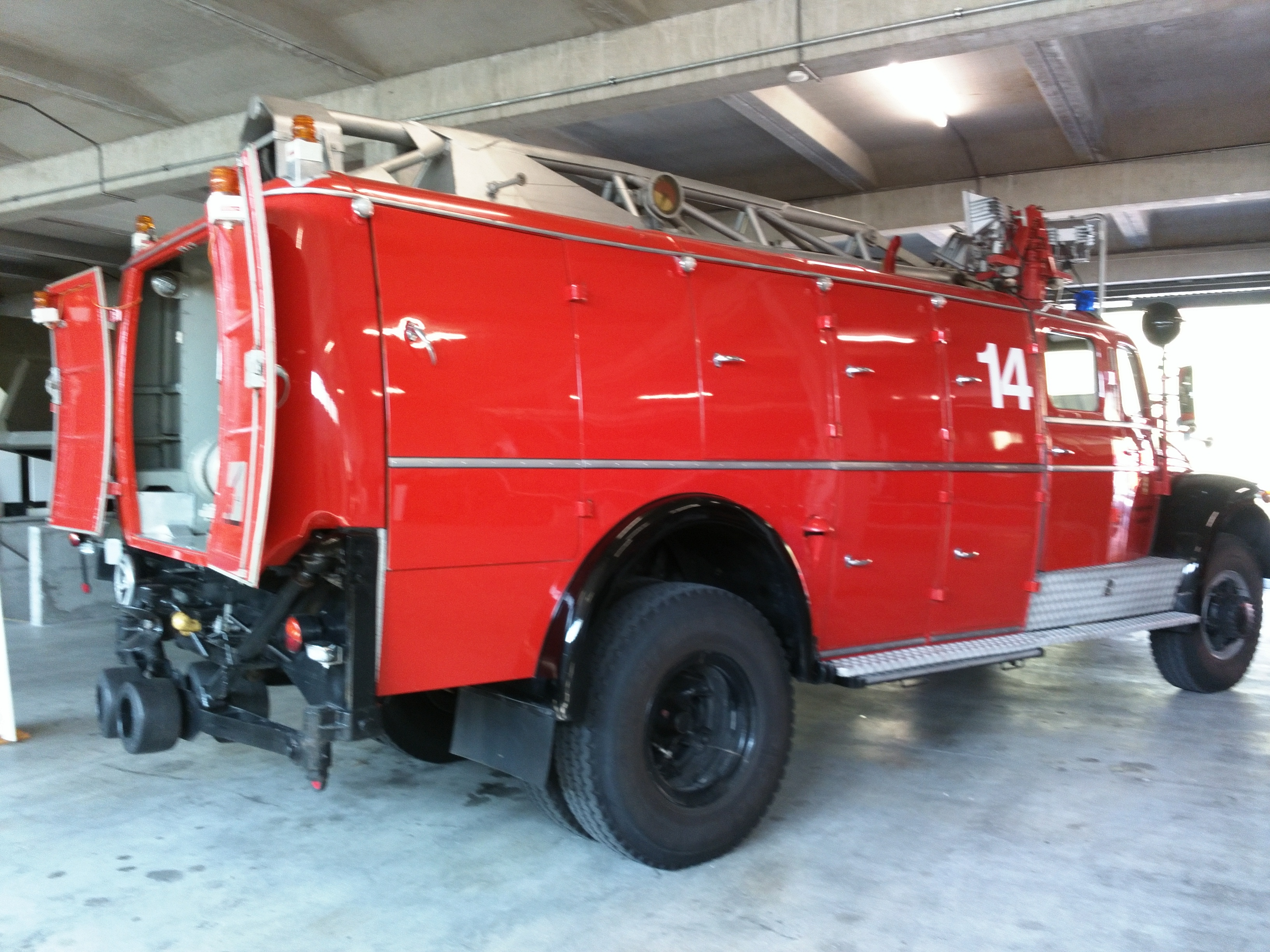
Magirus Deutz Muni Side

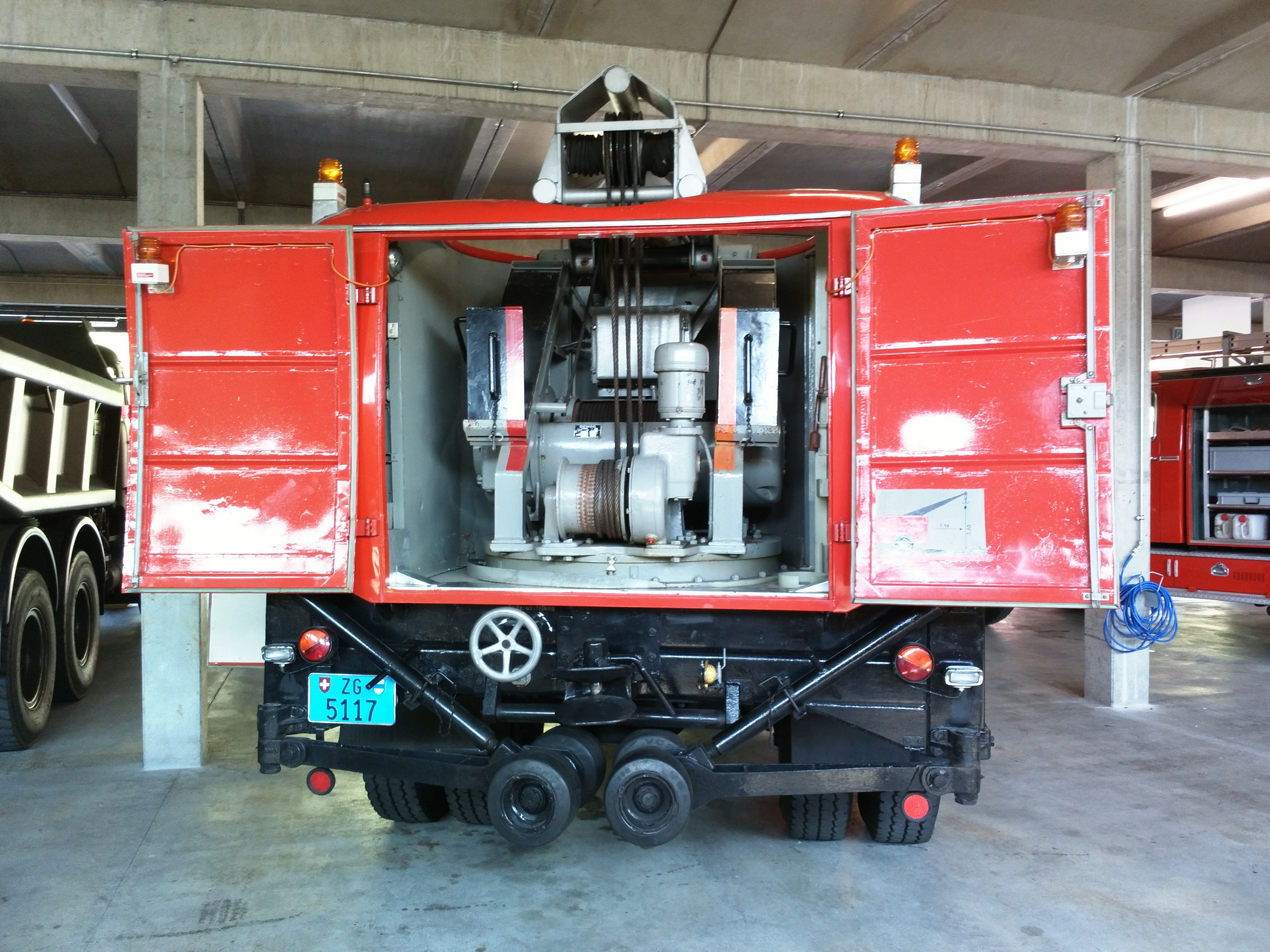
Magirus Deutz Muni tail

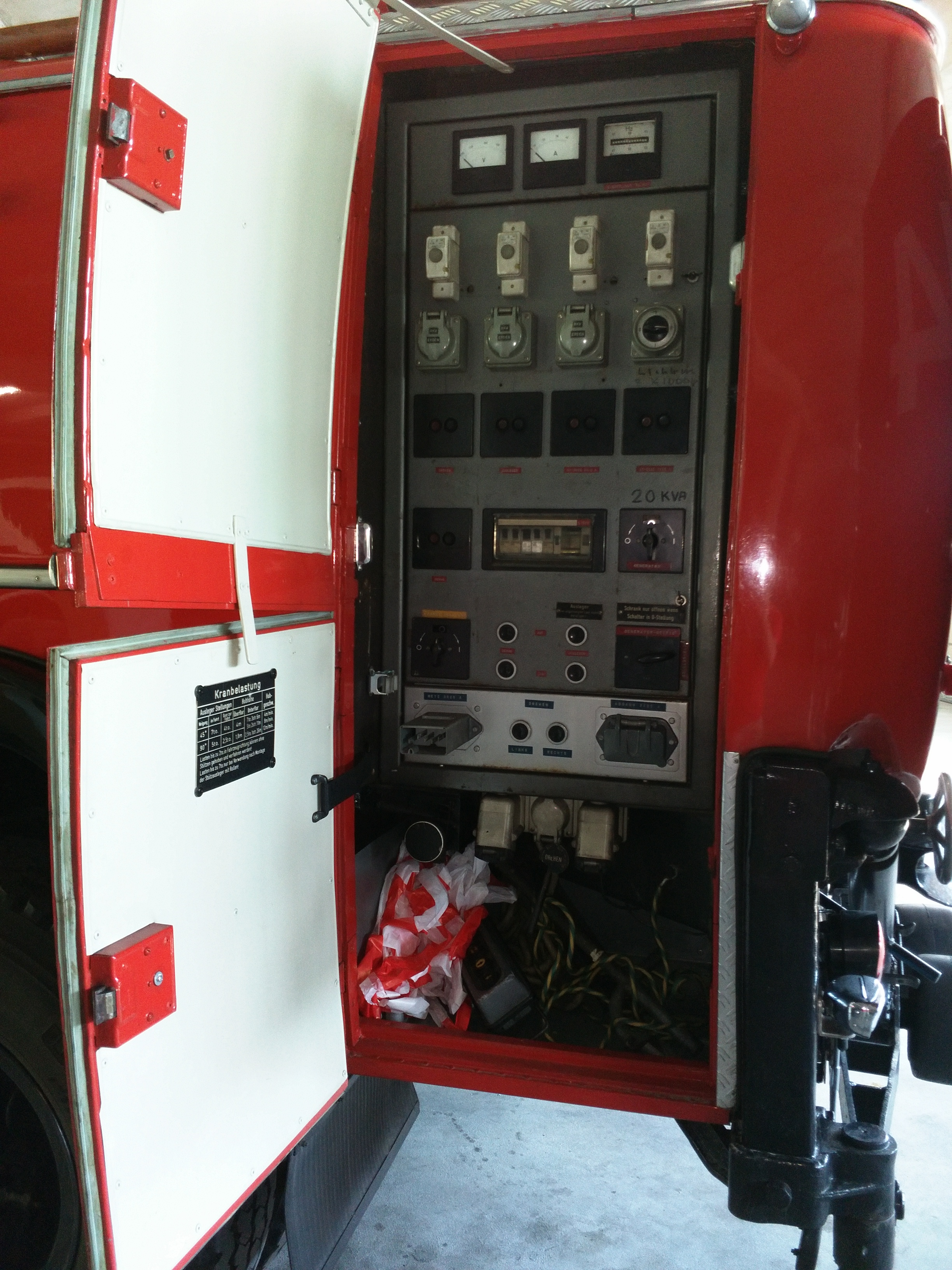
Magirus Deutz panel

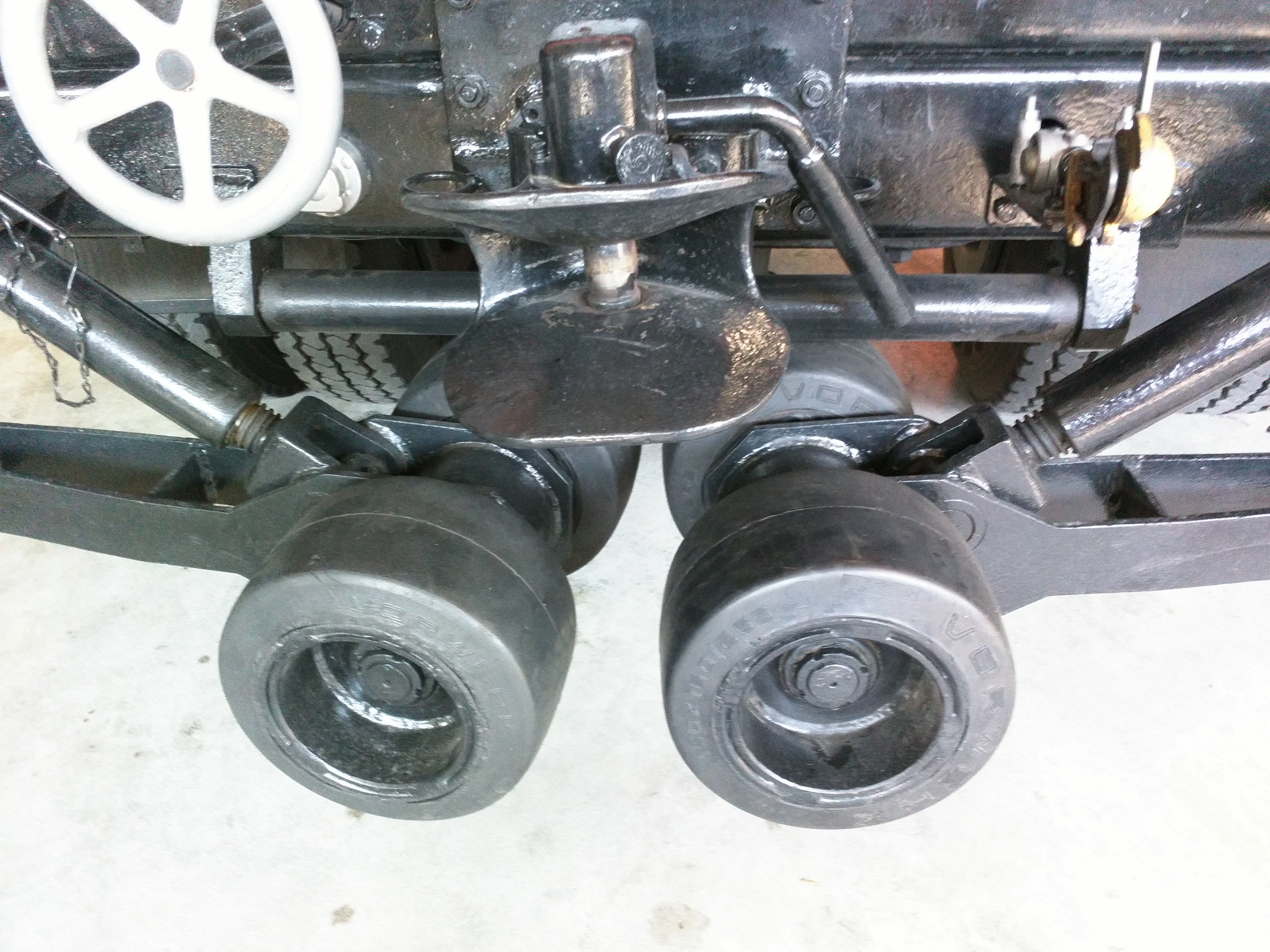
support rollers
