= Geser F-250 4x4 =

Firefighting vehicle

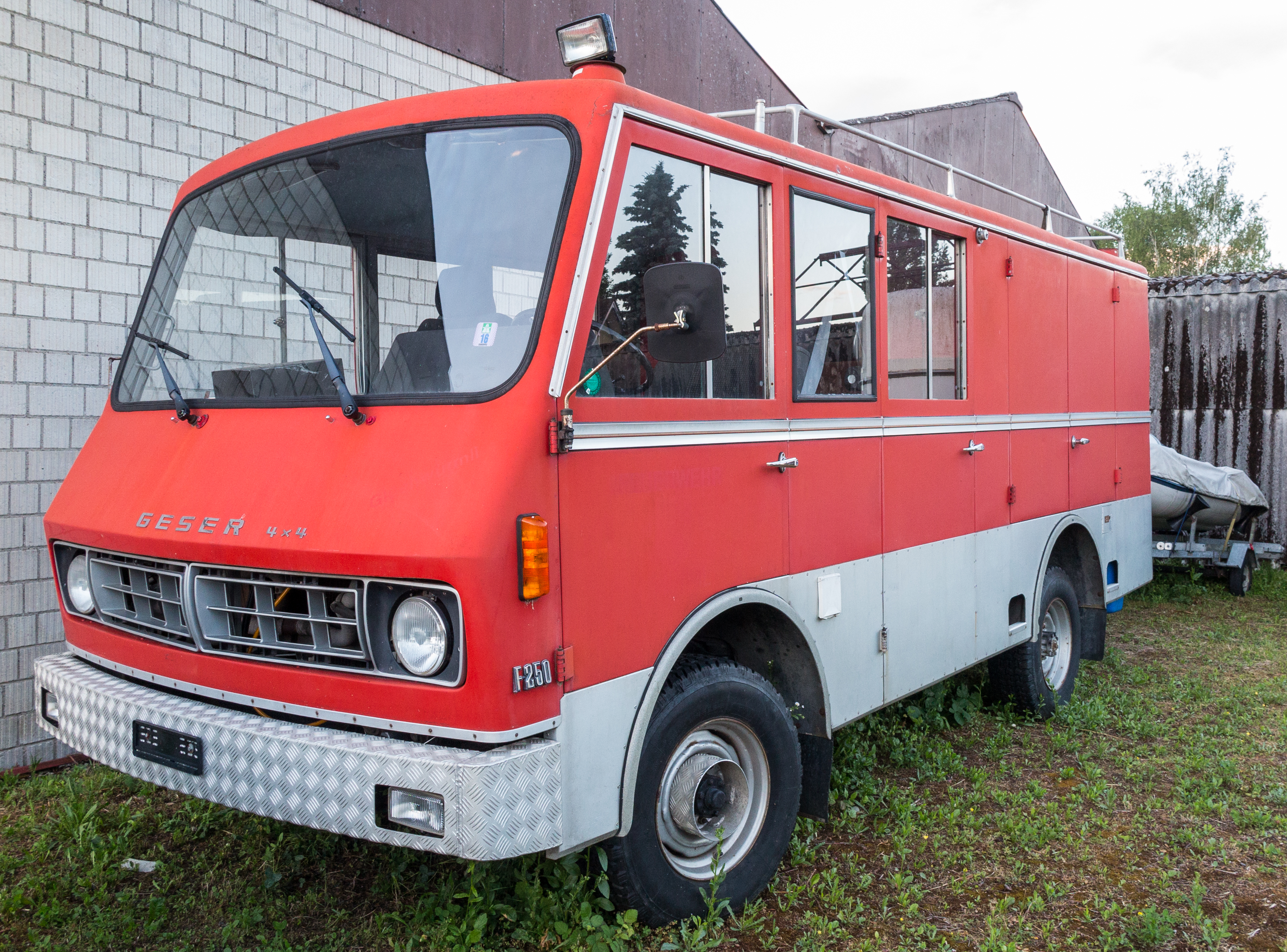
- Geser F-250 4x4
- Place of origin: Switzerland

Service history
- Used by: Fire department in Switzerland

Production history
- Designed: 1975
- Manufacturer: Geser AG
- Variants: delivery van

Specifications
- Mass: 4,500 kg (9,900 lb)
- Length: 5.7 m (220 in)
- Width: 2.6 m (100 in)
- Height: 2.65 m (104 in)
- Crew: 1 driver + 7 to 9 pax
- Engine: V8 Petrol with lead additive 11.32 hp
- Transmission: Borg - Warner 4-speed transmission.
- Suspension: 4x4 wheeled
- Maximum speed: 140 km/h (87 mph)

The Geser F-250 4x4 is a fire-fighting vehicle from Switzerland.

== History and development ==
Since 1975, the Geser F-250 4x4 fire brigade vehicles have been designed at Geser AG in Littau, Canton of Lucerne. Often specifically adapted to the different needs of Swiss fire brigades. The Geser F-250 4x4 model is based on the Ford F-250 and was widely used as a respirator, crew and material carrier. The vehicle has all-wheel drive with terrain reduction with compensation in the transfer case and automatic differential lock at the rear axle. It has a trailer hook for carrying various firefighter equipment on a trailer, if required. The tires consist of 4x 9.50 16.5 TC with a pneumatic pressure of 4.5 bar at the front and 5.0 bar at the rear. The braking system is based on vacuum-assisted hydraulic brakes. Various fire brigades in Switzerland have such vehicles still as oldtimer for partys and parades in the inventory. A Geser F-250 4x4 of the volunteer fire brigade of the city of Zug in the configuration as respiratory protection vehicle is located in the Zuger Depot Technikgeschichte (Zug depot of technical history).

== Pictures ==
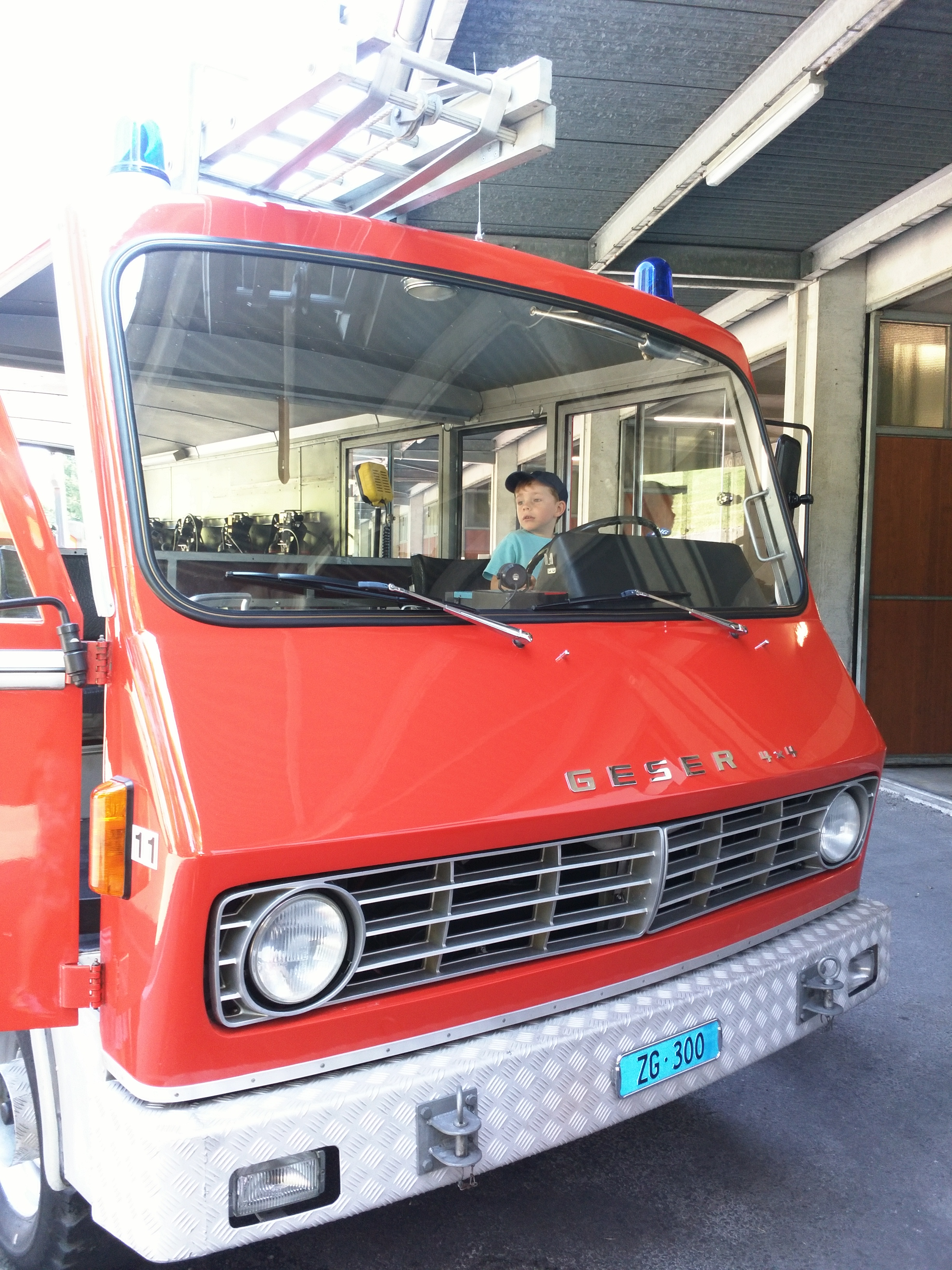
Geser 4x4 F-250 Front

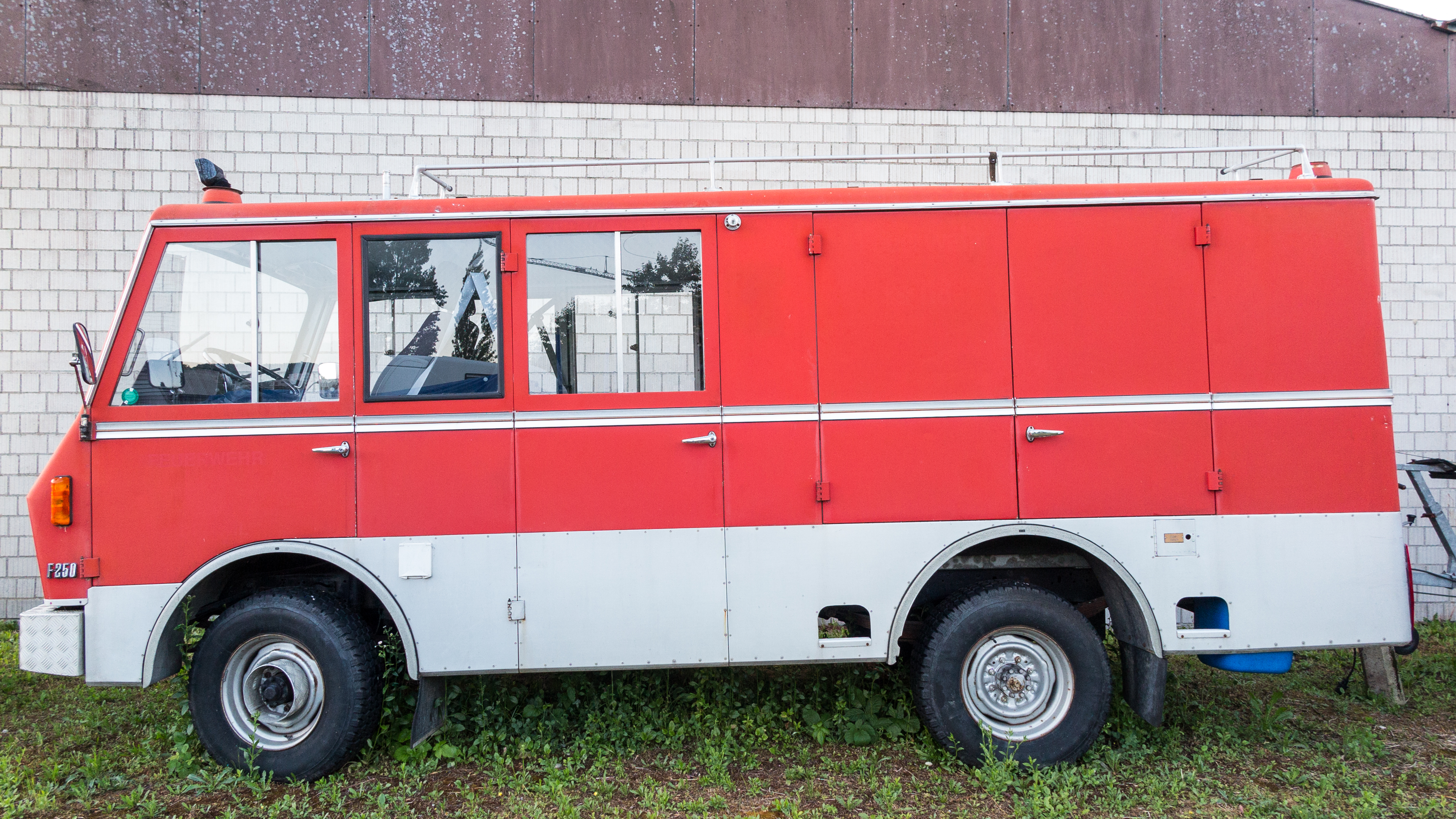
Geser 4x4 F250 Side

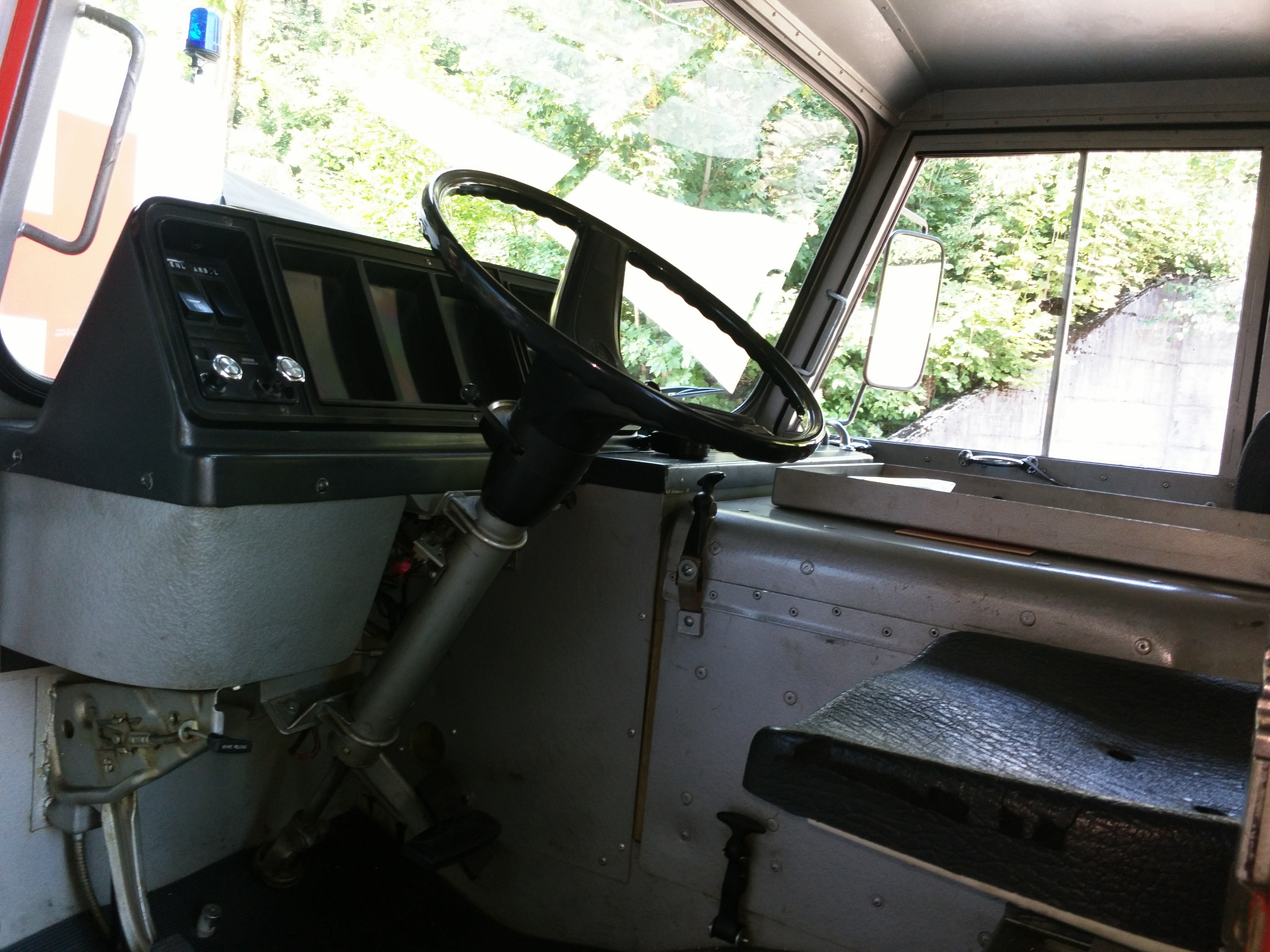
Geser 4x4 F-250 Cockpit

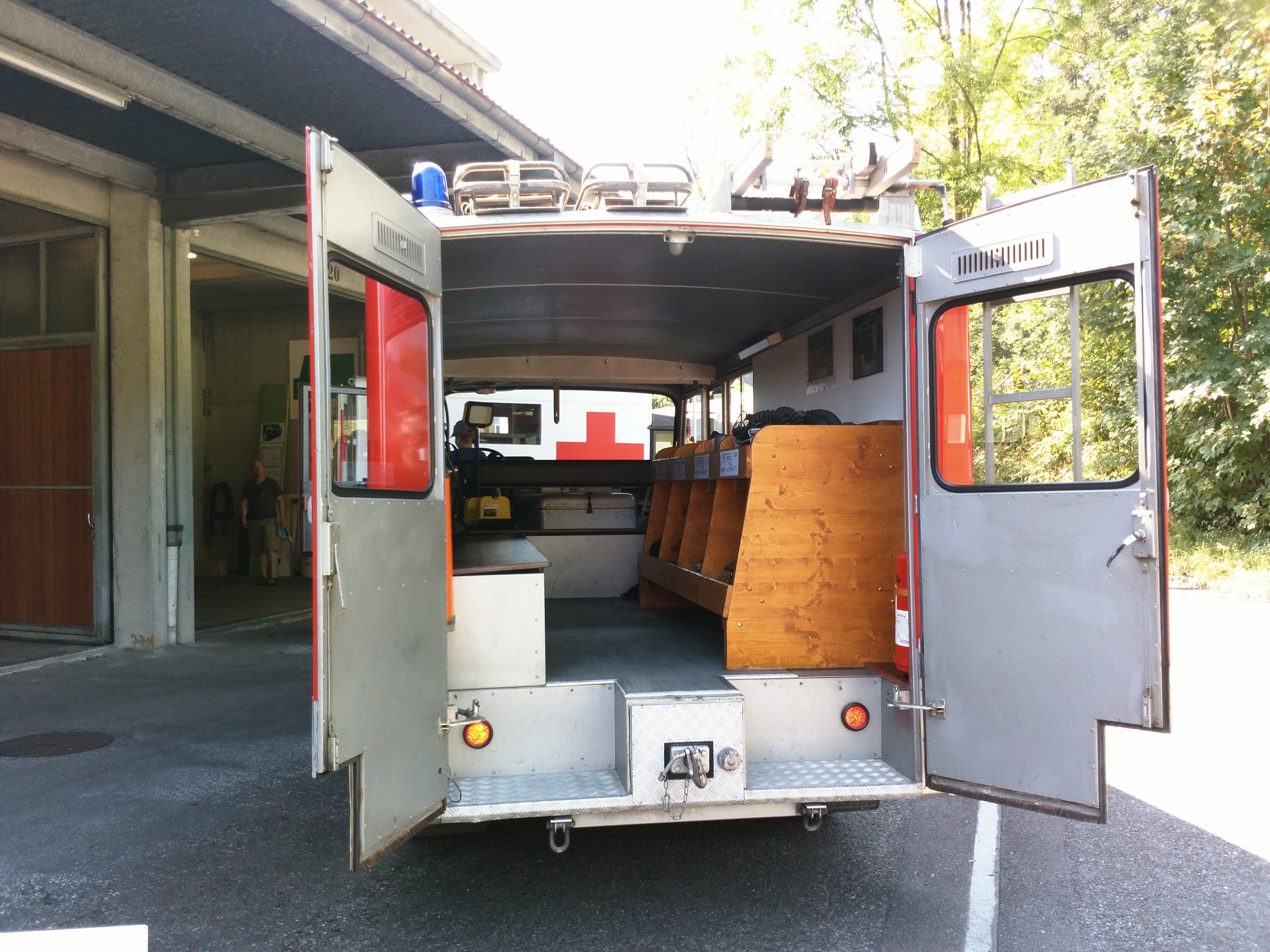
Geser 4x4 F-250 Back
