= Saurer MH4 =

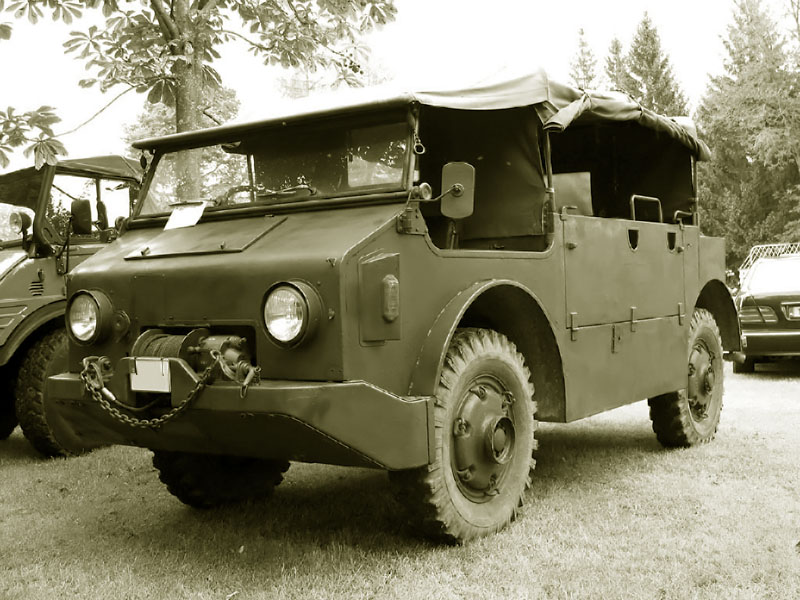
- Saurer MH4
- Place of origin: Switzerland

Service history
- In service: 1945 to 1985
- Used by: Switzerland

Production history
- Manufacturer: Adolph Saurer AG.
- Variants: CR1DM, CR2DM

Specifications
- Mass: 4.290tonnes empty, Payload 1.500tonnes,
- Length: 5.16 m (203 in)
- Width: 1.95 m (77 in)
- Height: 2.20 m (87 in)
- Crew: Driver 1 +1 Auxiliary and 6 man on the bridge
- Engine: Motor Saurer, CR 1 DM 4-cylinder engine, four-stroke, direct injection 5322 cc 70 hp (75 HP CR2DM) / 51.5 kW at 1900 r / min Maximum torque 290 Nm at 1200 r / min
- Suspension: 4x4 wheeled
- Fuel capacity: Fuel tank capacity 70 liters (100 liters CR2DM), in the vehicle's longitudinal axis in the material space, from left
- Maximum speed: 70 km/h (43 mph)

The Saurer MH4 was a military vehicle of the Swiss Army that was produced by the company Saurer, and was used from 1945 to 1985 as troop transport.

== History and description ==
The M4, Saurer Factory designation 4MH, 4-wheeled vehicle (M for military version and H (Heck) for rear engine) was specially developed as a howitzer tow vehicle. The vehicle had permanent four-wheel drive, Kegelraddifferenziale front and rear. Many parts corresponded to the execution of the M6 and M8 Saurer 6x6 and 8x8 military trucks. The engine was almost identical, but had two fewer cylinders.

The model 1946 Saurer had a CR1DM four-cylinder engine with 70 horsepower. The newer model CR2DM from 1952 had an engine with 75 HP. All were equipped with M4 front winch, pulling 2500 kg, cable length 70 meters. Cable only forward possible. The model 1946, behind the cab side. Each 3 consecutive bucket seats, in the middle of room for ammunition, equipment and tools, tarpaulin roof on steel framework, open side.

The Model 1952 had between cab and engine a loading ramp with a small folding side loading, front and back on that bridge had a foldable bench for 4 persons capacity, increased by around 600 kg to 2250 kg On Model 1952 also the fuel tank was arranged differently, the content increased from 70 to 100 liters. A new front fascia and a revised hood were also improvements of the Model 1952. The five-speed transmission remained unchanged, as is the steering. Since the engine was installed behind a relatively light steering and a good survey showed ahead.

The close seating arrangement at 4MH was also by design. To achieve the lowest possible car silhouette, the seats were within and not located on the wheel arches. Consequently, there was only space in center of the vehicle. Stability in the area was compared with the Saurer M6 and M8, despite the almost identical central tube frame means substantially better. Regarding off-road capability, he stood by his multi-wheeled brothers M6 and M8 in nothing. While pulling heavy trailer loads in the grounds of the rear engine also played out his trump card. One is on display at the Schweizerische Militärmuseum Full and one in the Zuger Depot Technikgeschichte.

=== Specifications ===
- Wheelbase 2900 mm
- Towing capacity 5900 kg
- Electrical system 24 volt 2 batteries, 12 volt 105 Ah

== Sources & References ==
- Oerlikon Google Finances
- Oerlikon Milestones / January 2007 : incorporation of Saurer AG
- Federal Registry of Commerce Switzerland Canton of Schwyz, Switzerland
- Fahrzeuge der Schweizer Armee by Markus Hofmann (2000)
- Klaus Fischer: Feuerwehrfahrzeuge in der Schweiz.Feuerwehr-Archiv. Verlag Technik Berlin 2000, ISBN 3-341-01250-8
