= History of the Swiss Air Force =

Swiss Air Force
- Founded: 31 July 1914
- Country: Switzerland
- Type: Air force
- Role: Aerial warfare Anti-aircraft warfare
- Part of: Swiss Armed Forces
- Staff to the Chief of the Armed Forces: Bundeshaus Ost, Bern

Insignia
- Roundel

The history of the Swiss Air Force began in 1914 with the establishment of an ad hoc force consisting of a handful of men in outdated and largely civilian aircraft. It was only in the 1930s that an effective air force was established at great cost, capable of inflicting several embarrassing defeats on the Nazi Luftwaffe in the course of an initially vigorous defence of neutral Swiss airspace. The Swiss Air Force as an autonomous military service was created in October 1936. After World War II it was renamed the Swiss Air Force and Anti-Aircraft Command (Schweizerische Flugwaffe Kommando der Flieger und Fliegerabwehrtruppen) and in 1996 became a separate service independent from the Army, under its present name Schweizer Luftwaffe.

The mission of the Swiss Air Force historically has been to support ground troops (erdkampf) in repelling invasions of neutral Swiss territory, with a secondary mission of defending the sovereignty of Swiss airspace. During World War II this doctrine was severely tested when Switzerland was literally caught in the middle of an air war and subjected to both attacks and intrusions by aircraft of all combatants. Its inability to prevent such violations of its neutrality led for a period to a complete cessation of air intercepts, followed by a practice of coercing small numbers of intruders to submit to internment.

At the end of the 1950s, reflecting both the threat of possible invasion by the Soviet Union and the realities of nuclear warfare, Swiss military doctrine changed to that of a dynamic (mobile) defense that included missions for the Swiss Air Force outside of its territory, in order to defeat standoff attacks and nuclear threats, including the possibility of defensive employment of air-delivered nuclear weapons. However the inability to field an air force of sufficient capability to carry out such missions led to a return of traditional doctrine.

In 1995 the Swiss abandoned traditional doctrine and implemented a defensive plan that made control of Swiss airspace its highest and main priority. Modernization of the Swiss Air Force to achieve this mission was subject to popular referendums challenging its cost and practice.

== Swiss balloon forces ==
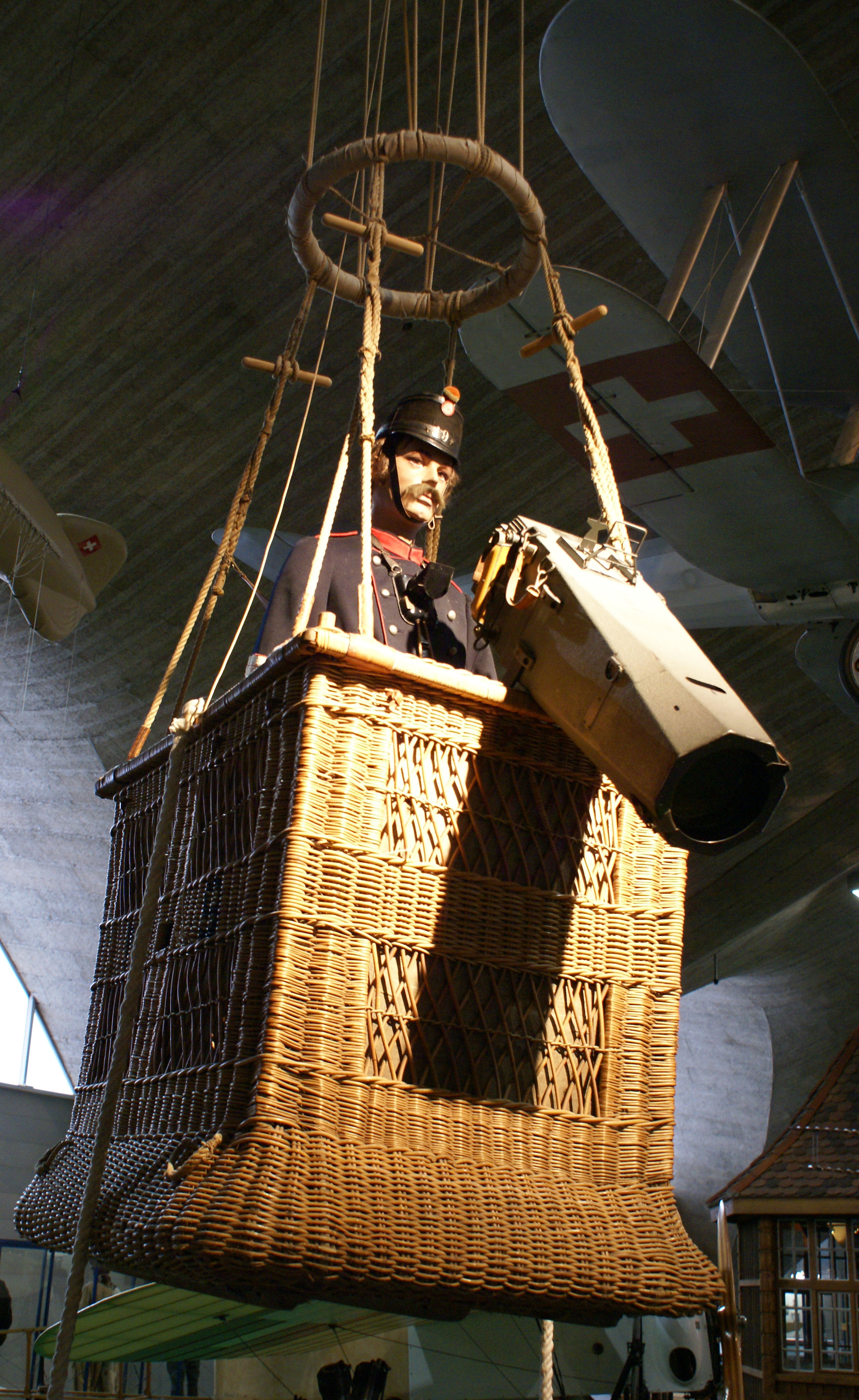
Part of a replica of a Swiss Army observation balloon.

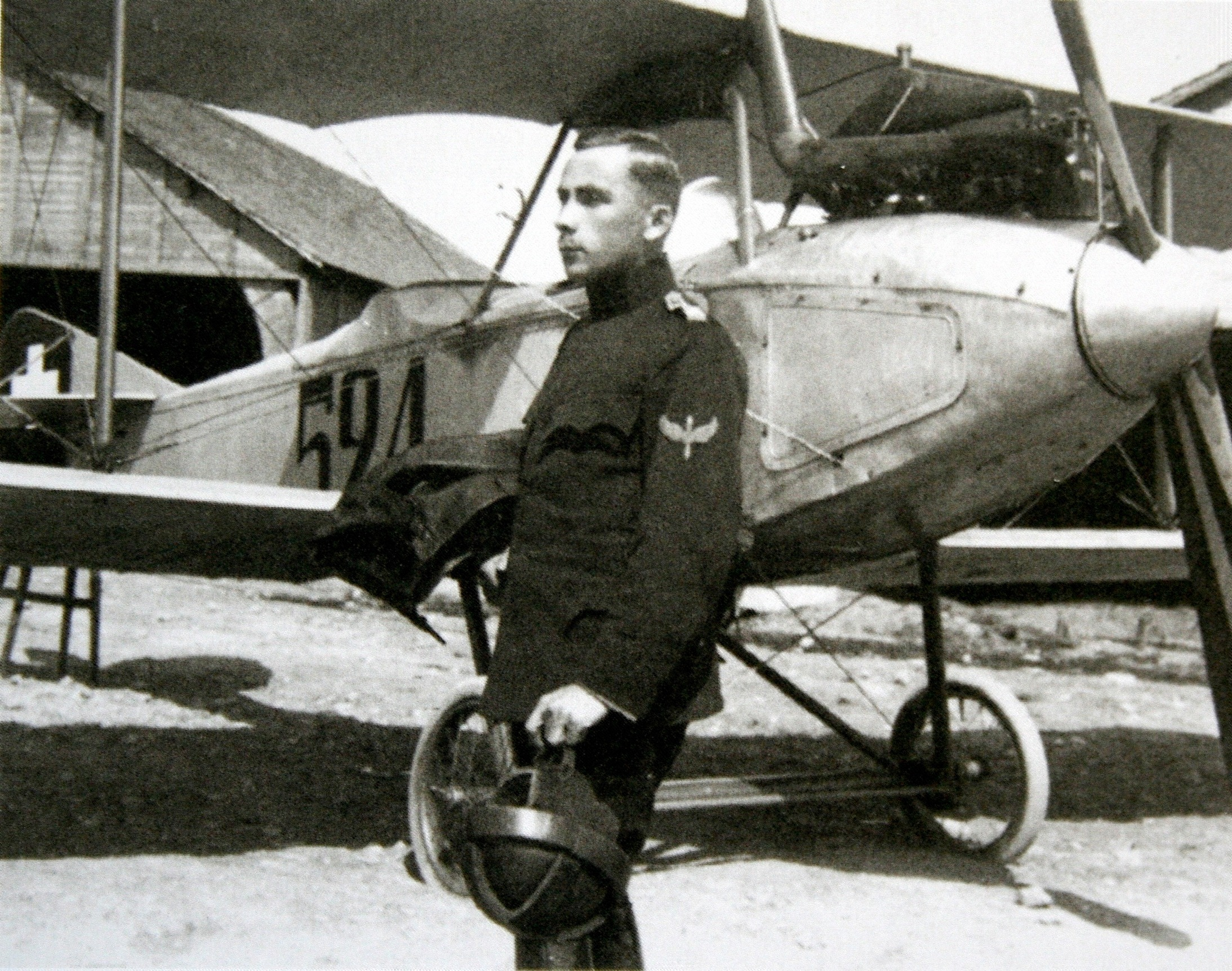
Aviation pioneer Walter Mittelholzer, probably 1918 at Dübendorf airfield

Swiss military aviation began in 1900 with the creation of an observation balloon force. Swiss balloonists were first engaged in combat on 7 October 1918, near the end of World War I, when a German airplane accidentally attacked a Swiss observation balloon stationed close to the German border and killed the observer, Lieutenant Werner Flury. The balloon force was eventually disestablished in 1938 when developments in aviation made it obsolete.

== Heavier-than-air aviation in World War I ==
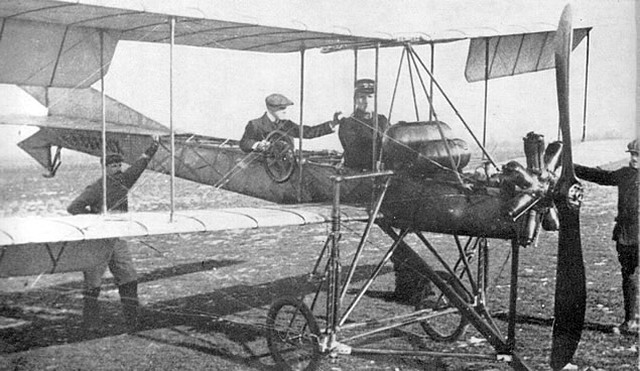
Ernest Failloubaz (pilot) and Gustave Lecoultre (observer) demonstrating the Dufaux 5 to the Swiss Army from September 4 to 6, 1911

Military trials with civilian airplanes were first conducted in 1911, resulting in many crashes that failed to persuade Swiss authorities of the military utility of the airplane. From September 4 to 6, 1911, Failloubaz participated as pilot (his friend Gustave Lecoultre as observer) to an exercise with the 1st Swiss Army Corps and demonstrated the military possibilities of aircraft with his Dufaux 5; the beginning of the military aviation in Switzerland. Only after the Swiss Officers' Society collected approximately 1,723,000 Swiss francs in 1912– a very large sum for the time – in a national fund drive to the create an air force, did the Swiss Federal Council order the establishment of a Fliegerabteilung on 3 August 1914. The government also decreed that only bachelors could become military pilots, to avoid the payment of expensive widow's pensions in the event of casualties.

The outbreak of World War I, in which neutral Switzerland did not take part, and an indifference to air power of the part of the Swiss military establishment prevented the purchase of modern airplanes required to build an effective air force. By the end of 1914, the force consisted of only eight men flying privately owned airplanes, and by July 1916, four pilots had been killed in crashes. Swiss aircraft were armed only with carbines and flechettes, ineffective pointed iron spikes that were to be dropped on ground targets. The nominal commander of the Swiss air arm, cavalry captain Theodor Real, resigned his post in November 1916 when the army refrained from using its rudimentary air force to defend Swiss airspace against frequent German intrusions, even after Porrentruy was accidentally bombed by German aircraft on 11 October 1916.

The first purpose-built military aircraft in the Swiss air force was a Fokker D.II seized after a German pilot made a forced landing in foul weather near Bettlach on 13 October 1916. In June 1917, five Nieuport 23 C.1 fighter planes were acquired from France. Swiss industry manufactured more than 100 Häfeli DH-3 observation aircraft, but efforts to build a Swiss fighter (the Häfeli DH-4) were halted in 1918 because of the prototypes' poor performance. By the end of the war, the Swiss air force had only 62 pilots and 68 aircraft of nine different makes, almost all of which were suitable only for observation missions. Its wartime budget of CHF 15 million amounted to 1.25% of Swiss military expenditures.

== Interwar years ==
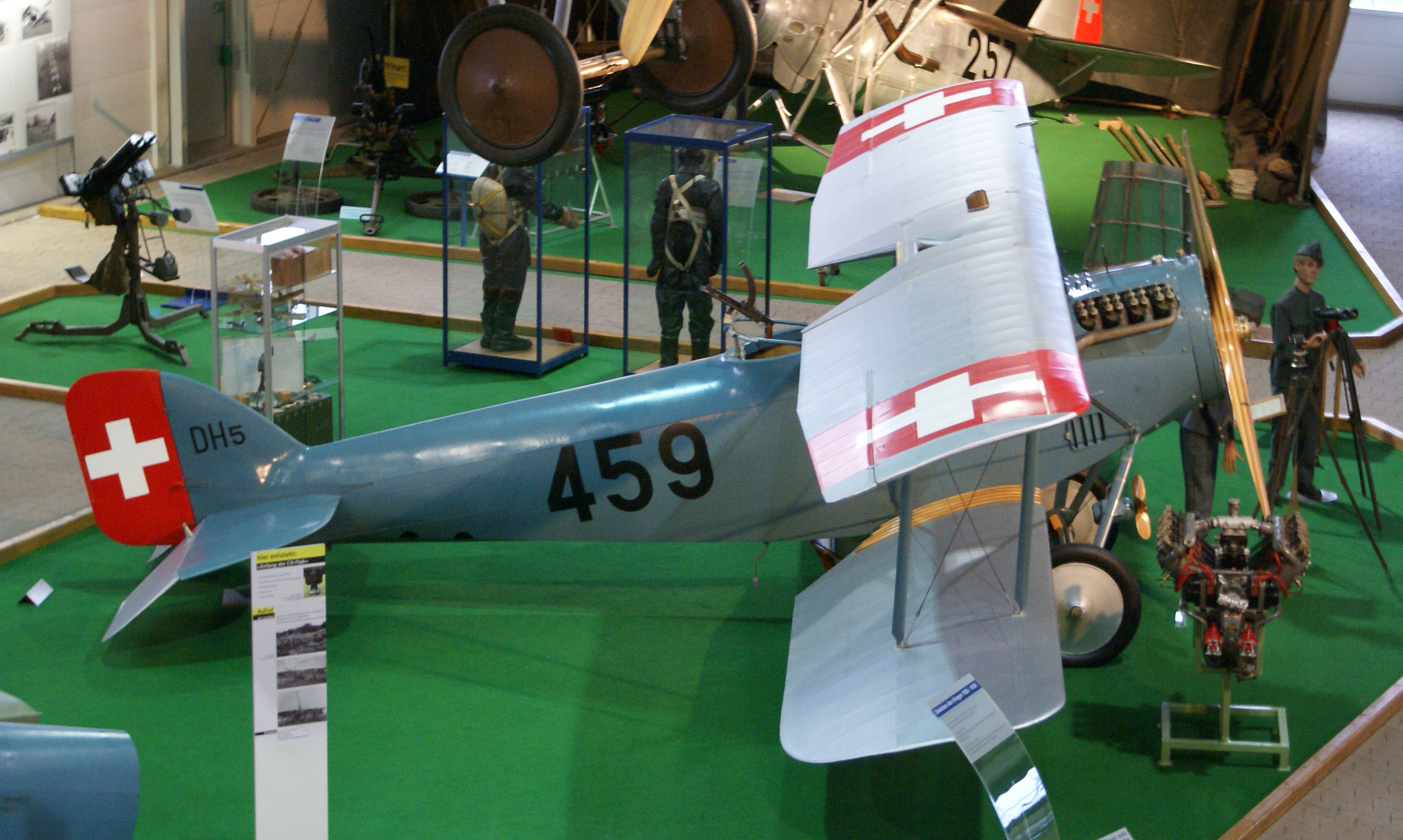
The Swiss-built Häfeli DH-5 reconnaissance aircraft were in service from 1922 to 1940.

With continuing budgetary restraints, the air force remained in an overall state of neglect during the 1920s. 27 Fokker D.VII, 16 Hanriot HD.1, and 15 Nieuport 28 war surplus airplanes were acquired in 1920 (as were 20 Zeppelin C.II reconnaissance biplanes obtained on the postwar black market) but were soon obsolete, and further efforts to develop indigenous aircraft (MA-6, MA-7, and MA-8) were unsuccessful. Seven pilots were killed in 1925 and 1926 before all Swiss military aircraft were equipped with parachutes. By 1929, only 17 of its 213 airplanes were considered fit for service. The air force consisted of 18 aviation companies (Flieger-Kompagnien), three aerial photography platoons and one airfield company. In the decade following World War I, 162 pilots and 165 observers were trained, and the full complement of the air force was 196 officers, 499 NCOs and 2241 enlisted men. The only aircraft purchased in any quantity were the Potez XXV, and the Swiss-built Häfeli DH-5.

The difficulty of maintaining an air force with little funding during a time of rapid technological development was compounded by the Swiss militia system: all but a handful of military personnel were citizen soldiers who served only a few weeks each year following their initial recruitment phase. Military pilot candidates underwent the same recruit training, NCO school and officer candidate school as other Swiss army officers, followed by a pilot school of 173 days, then re-entered civilian life. During his first two years of service, a pilot's training continued with ten logged flight hours per month, and thereafter he was required to fly fifty hours per year at his convenience.

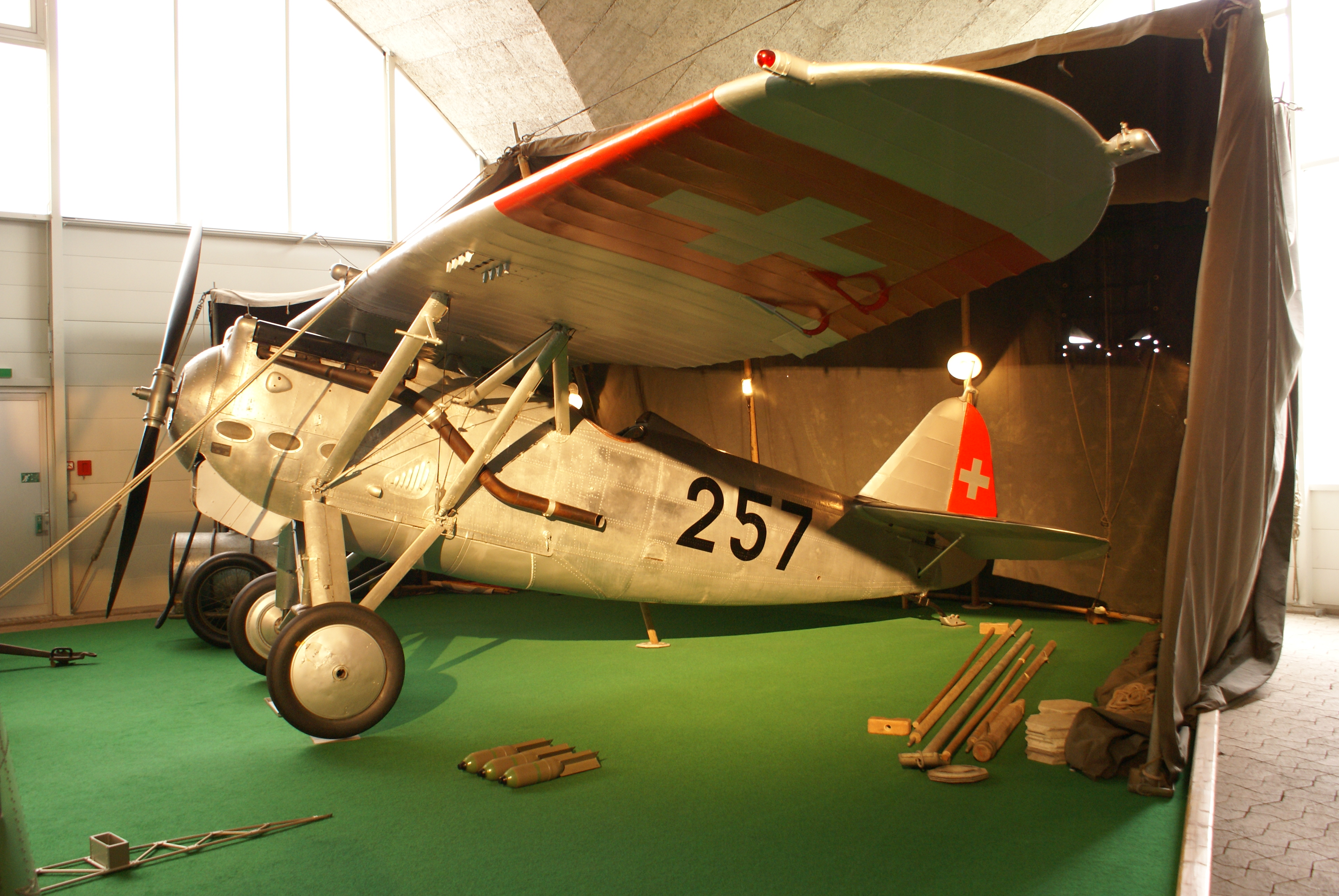
A Dewoitine D.27 in Swiss service.

However, in 1930 the military and civilian leadership decided to establish an effective air force. On 13 December 1929, in what was in retrospect referred to as the "bill to create an air force", the Federal Council asked the Swiss Federal Assembly to approve the spending of 20 million francs for the purchase of 65 French Dewoitine D.27 fighters and the manufacture of 40 Dutch (Fokker C.V-E) reconnaissance planes under licence. Although the opposition Social Democratic Party collected 42,000 signatures in a petition opposing the bill, Parliament passed it handily and declined to allow a referendum on the issue, optional at that time for spending bills.

This was the start of a massive armament programme that would consume more than a billion francs over the next ten years, but after Hitler's rise to power in Nazi Germany, the Social Democrats added their support to the efforts. They also supported Gottlieb Duttweiler's 1938 popular initiative calling for the purchase of a thousand aircraft and the training of three thousand pilots. After 92,000 citizens signed in support, nearly twice the number necessary for a national popular vote, the federal government offered a referendum proposal in 1939 that was nearly as extensive, which was accepted by a 69 percent majority.

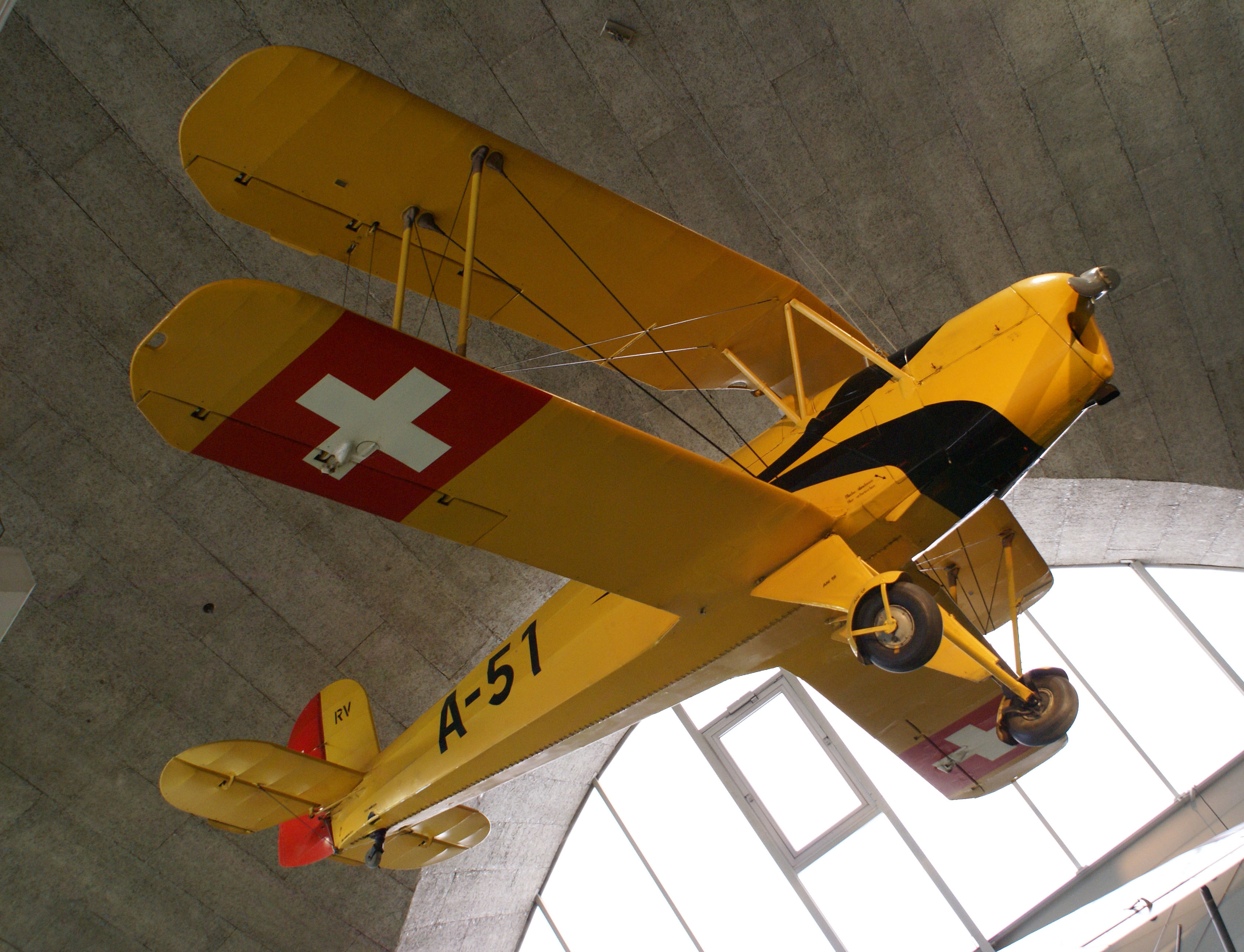
Bü 131-B Jungmann basic trainer

In large part, the money was used to acquire modern aircraft. In 1937 and 1938, Swiss defense officials, including the Commander of the Swiss Air Force and at least two Swiss military pilots, evaluated the Heinkel He 112 and Messerschmitt Bf 109 D/E (Germany), Morane-Saulnier M.S.405/406 (France), Fiat G.50 (Italy), Supermarine Spitfire I (Great Britain) and the Curtiss Hawk 75A-1/P-36 (USA). Consequently, the Swiss government attempted to purchase Spitfires, along with a licence to build them in Switzerland, but this transaction did not materialize. Instead, 90 state-of-the-art Messerschmitt Bf 109D and E fighters were acquired from Germany in 1938 for 36.6 million francs, the last of which were delivered in April 1940, eight months after the outbreak of World War II. However, the need to expand the size of the pilot corps resulted in the acquisition of 146 trainers from Germany, the Bücker Bü 131 basic and Bücker Bü 133 advanced trainers.

In addition, Swiss factories licence-built 82 Morane-Saulnier D-3800 and 207 D-3801 fighters between 1939 and 1945, and manufactured 152 domestically designed C-36 fighter-bombers between 1942 and 1948. Both of these types remained in service well into the 1950s as trainers.

On 19 October 1936, the air arm was reorganised, and renamed the Schweizerische Flugwaffe (Department of Aviation and Anti-Aircraft Defense), becoming an autonomous service under the Swiss Federal Military Department, analogous to the organizational autonomy of the United States Army Air Forces within the U.S. Army. The Bambini-Code was developed from the need to communicate via radio links in bad quality in noisy environments, of the aircraft who were used from the Swiss Air Force before the start of the second world war.

== World War II ==
The Swiss Air Force mobilized on 28 August 1939, three days before Germany attacked Poland and initiated World War II, with 96 fighter and 121 observation aircraft; by some accounts the country possessed only eight antiaircraft searchlights. Of the 21 units of the Swiss Air Force, only three were judged combat-ready and five were not yet equipped with aircraft. The Air Force relied on 40 single-seat interceptors for first-line air defense.

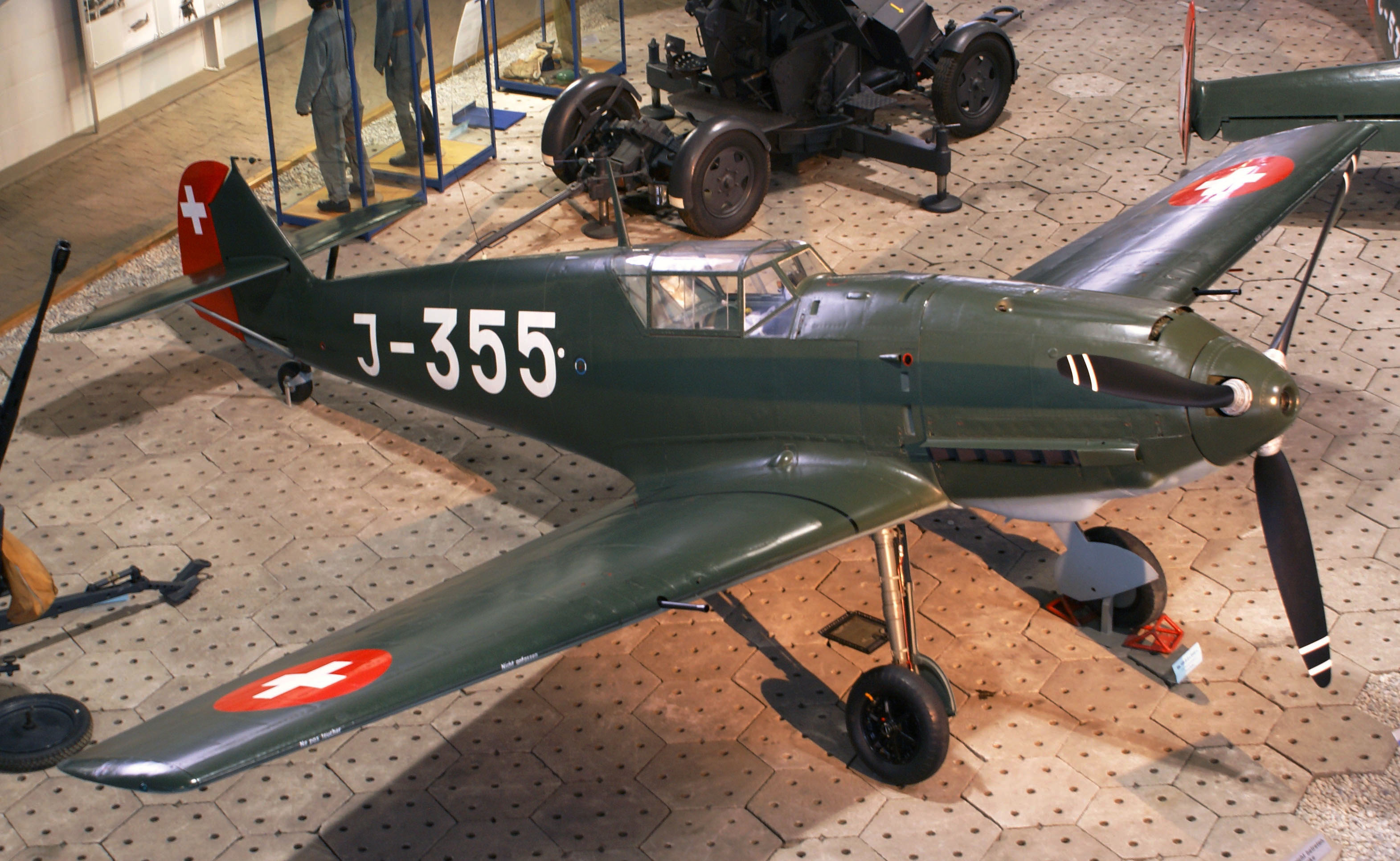
Bf 109E of the Swiss Air Force.

This deficiency was addressed by procuring further German Bf 109 and French Morane D-3800 fighters. In 1942, the Swiss-built F+W C-36 multipurpose aircraft was introduced into service, and in 1943, Switzerland opened its own aircraft factory, Flugzeugwerk Emmen. Caverns were built in which to shelter aircraft and maintenance personnel from air attack, for example in Alpnach, Meiringen and Turtmann. In 1942–43, an air gunnery range at Ebenfluh-Axalp was opened for training. The Surveillance Squadron (Überwachungsgeschwader) was formed in 1941 and made combat-ready in 1943. A night fighter squadron was formed for evaluation purposes in 1944 and disbanded in 1950.

The role of the Swiss Air Force during World War II went through four distinct phases:

- September 1939 to May 1940: Air patrol, in an attempt to enforce a comprehensive no-fly ban issued by the Swiss government to the combatants, made largely ineffective by a 5–kilometer buffer along the border which Swiss fighters were forbidden to enter.
- May to June 1940: Air combat between Switzerland and Germany in which the Luftwaffe pilots tested Swiss air defenses, and were defeated.
- July 1940 to October 1943: A total ban on air operations, and a release of interned German aircraft and pilots, resulting from the encirclement of Swiss territory by the Axis, the implementation of the Réduit strategy, and recognition that the Air Force would be overwhelmed by the Germans in a sustained campaign.
- October 1943 to May 1945: Resumption of air patrols, a largely passive response, measured by the numbers of intercepts versus the numbers of violations.

=== Defense of Swiss airspace ===
During the first months of the war, airmen and anti-aircraft soldiers saw only sporadic combat; it was on 10 May 1940, when Germany commenced the drive into the west, that the Swiss army as a whole was mobilized a second time. At the onset of the campaign, German military aircraft first violated Swiss airspace.

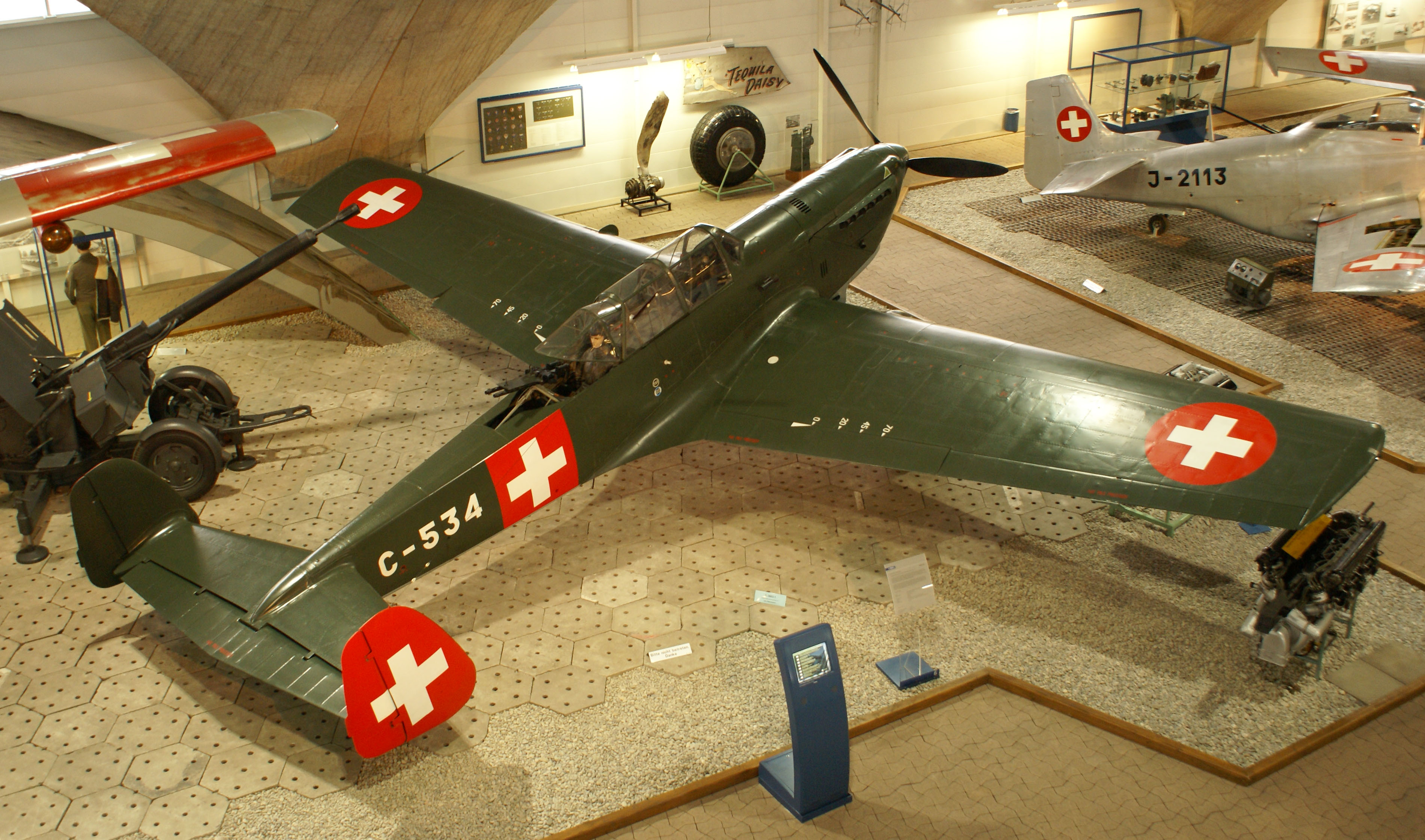
C-3603-1 indigenous fighter/reconnaissance aircraft, in use from 1942 to 1952.

The first serious combat involving the Swiss Air Force began in June 1940. In six days of aerial battles, eleven German aircraft were downed, with a loss of two Swiss aircraft and three airmen killed. Following these incidents, on 6 June, the chief of the Luftwaffe, Hermann Göring, protested the attacks, claiming that most of the German planes had been in French airspace and that the Luftwaffe had entered Swiss airspace only by mistake. Germany demanded financial compensation and an apology by the Swiss government. In a second, more pointed demand on 19 June, Germany stated that they viewed the air battles as a flagrant act of aggression, and if these interceptions continued, Switzerland would face sanctions and retaliation. The next day, General Henri Guisan ordered all Swiss units to stop engaging foreign aircraft, and on 1 July 1940, the Federal Council apologized for possible border violations by Swiss pilots, without admitting any had occurred. On 16 July, the German government declared that the events were settled. Engaging aircraft of the combatant nations was prohibited until October 1943, when strategic bombing of Bavaria and Austria by the Allies became an increasing likelihood.

In September 1944, the last Swiss airman died in combat, shot down by an American P-51 Mustang while escorting a crippled U.S. B-17 Flying Fortress to the Dübendorf airfield. During the entire war, 6,501 Allied and Axis aircraft violated Swiss airspace, 198 of which aircraft landed on Swiss soil and were interned, and 56 of which crashed.

Swiss aircraft also intercepted U.S. aircraft who were off-course, or whose crews preferred asylum in Swiss internment camps over German or Italian POW camps; they were then forced to land on Swiss airstrips. When the bombers did not cooperate or even fired at the Swiss (who were using Axis-type interceptors), they were shot down.

=== Night fighter incident ===
In 1944 a Luftwaffe Bf 110G-4 night fighter pursued a British Lancaster heavy bomber into Swiss airspace on the night of April 28–29. Engine trouble forced the German pilot, Wilhelm Johnen, to land at Dübendorf airfield where the pilot was interned. By international law, the Swiss had a right to put the fighter into service, and the Germans were concerned that Allied intelligence would examine its FuG 220 Lichtenstein radar and "Schräge Musik" gun installation.

The Nazi government quickly negotiated a deal in which the Swiss burned the Bf 110 under the supervision of German observers in return for a sale to the Swiss of 12 new Bf 109G-6 Gustav to replace combat losses. The new fighters were delivered in batches of six on 20 and 22 May. The new planes had serious manufacturing defects from the poor workmanship and production disruptions caused by Allied bombings, and after complaints the Germans refunded half of the six million Swiss franc purchase price. In 1947, the Swiss Air Force tried to purchase new replacement Daimler-Benz DB 605 engines from Sweden, licence built by Svenska Flygmotor AB (Swedish Aero Engines, Ltd.), but this was ruled out due to the prohibitive quoted price of 191,000 Swiss francs per engine. Such a purchase would have amounted to a total cost of over 2 million francs to re-power all 11 surviving postwar Swiss Gustav aircraft, plus the costs of spare engines, spare parts and any other repairs needed to bring them to an acceptable level of serviceability.

=== Attacks on Swiss cities ===
Swiss cities and railway lines were repeatedly bombed by Allied aircraft during the war, beginning with minor attacks by the Royal Air Force on Geneva, Basel, and Zürich in 1940. Possibly the most egregious occurred 1 April 1944 when 50 B-24 Liberators of the U.S. 14th Combat Bombardment Wing bombed Schaffhausen, killing and injuring more than 100, and damaging a large portion of the city. In reaction to comments by Swiss Foreign Minister Marcel Pilet-Golaz that the incident "apparently was a deliberate attack", American apologies were undermined by ill-advised statements made by Air Force commanders in London which blamed weather and minimized the size and accuracy of the attack. Although an in-depth investigation showed that weather in France, particularly winds that nearly doubled the ground speed of the U.S. bombers, did in fact cause the wing to mistake Schaffhausen for its target at Ludwigshafen am Rhein, the Swiss were not mollified. Incidents escalated, resulting in 13 separate attacks on Swiss territory on 22 February 1945—the day President Franklin D. Roosevelt's special assistant, Lauchlin Currie, went to Schaffhausen to lay a wreath on the graves of those killed a year earlier—and simultaneous attacks 4 March that dropped 29 tons of high explosives and 17 tons of incendiaries on Basel and Zürich.

Swiss air defenses were incapable of counteracting large formations of aircraft, but did intercept and, on occasion attack, small groups. Since these were often aircraft crippled by battle damage and seeking asylum, resentment among Allied aircrew was considerable. The causes of the misdirected bombing attacks were bad weather, faulty equipment, incompetence, or excess pilot zeal, rather than malice or purposeful planning, but the lack of intent did not allay the sufferings and suspicions of the Swiss, and the embarrassment to the United States was considerable. A pattern of violation, diplomatic apology, reparation, and new violation ensued through much of the war, and grew in scope as Allied tactical forces neared Germany. It is still a matter of debate if these bombings occurred by accident, since U.S. strategic air forces had a standing order requiring visual identification before bombing any target within 50 miles (80 km) of the Swiss frontier, or if some members of the Allies wanted to punish Switzerland for their economic and industrial cooperation with Nazi Germany. In particular, Switzerland permitted train transportation through its territory carrying matériel between Germany and Italy, which was readily visible from the air by Allied pilots.

The incidents drew to a close only after a USAAF delegation appointed by U.S. Army Chief of Staff George C. Marshall met with the Swiss in Geneva on 9 March 1945. The Swiss enumerated every violation since Schaffhausen and demanded full indemnity. The Americans advised that the area requiring positive target identification was henceforth expanded to 150 miles (240 km) from Swiss borders, that no targets within 50 miles (80 km) would be attacked even in clear weather except by personal authorization from American commander General Carl Spaatz, and then only by hand-picked crews, and that tactical air was forbidden to attack any target within ten miles (16 km) of the Swiss border. Even though these restrictions provided the Germans significant protection from air attack over a large part of southern Germany for the final two months of the war, they were effective in ending the violations and did not seriously hamper Allied prosecution of the war.

== Cold War ==
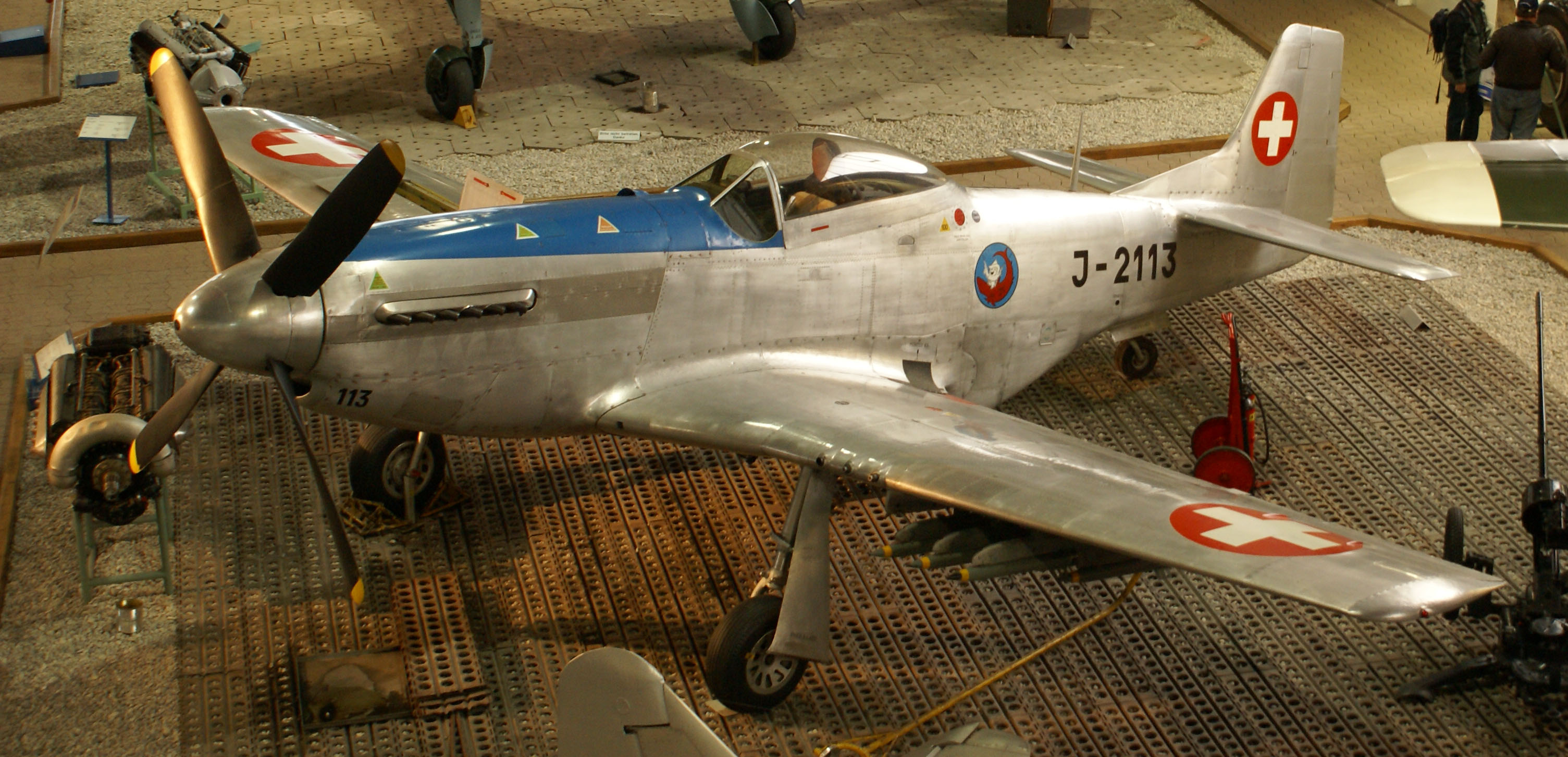
Swiss Air Force P-51

During World War II, Switzerland struggled with buying and building modern combat aircraft. The fourteen Bf 109G Gustavs acquired from the Germans (including two interned) proved increasingly difficult to maintain, and were removed from service in 1947, although the "Emil" variants purchased earlier continued on until 1949. The Swiss also acquired nearly 200 aircraft interned after violating its sovereignty, but most were unsuitable for Swiss operations.

However, in 1948 the Swiss were able to purchase 130 surplus P-51 Mustangs from the United States. Several other aircraft types followed, including the 220 de Havilland Vampires purchased in 1949 and 1953, 250 de Havilland Venoms acquired 1954–56, and 100 Hawker Hunters from 1958. The P-51s replaced the Messerschmitt Bf 109s and remained operational for a decade. Both the Venoms and Vampires showed remarkable longevity, with the Venoms in service until 1983 and the Vampires until 1990, more than 40 years. Remarkably the Swiss Air Force after these acquisitions was the first air force in the world to operate only jet aircraft in their front-line squadrons.

=== N-20 and P-16 ===
The Swiss government experimented in development and production of its own jet fighters, the FFA P-16 and the N-20 Aiguillon, but was not satisfied with them, desiring relatively simple aircraft that did not require extensive training and thus could be flown by militia pilots. These aircraft were developed in accordance with the doctrine of the Swiss Air Force that close air support of ground operations was its main task. The National Defense Commission (LVK), however, based on the experiences of World War II, also desired an aircraft capable of both "neutrality protection and raid-type operations", and the result was projects with inherent self-contradictions.

Hoping that competition would lead to the development of effective but simple ground-attack aircraft, the government asked the Flugzeugwerk Altenrhein (FFA, or "Aircraft Factory Altenrhein") and the Federal Aircraft Factory Emmen to develop jet-propelled fighters. Although the Federal Institute of Technology had a world-renowned aerodynamics laboratory, both projects ended in fiasco, as a result of which the Hunter was purchased instead and introduced into service in 1958.

Both models were plagued from the onset by inefficient engines, but were capable of the short-distance takeoffs required by the Swiss (330 m (1,080 ft) for the P–16, 232 m (761 ft) for the N-20). After wind tunnel and engine tests, but before the N–20 could make its maiden flight, Federal Councillor Karl Kobelt cancelled the N-20 project in 1953, leading to much resentment of the government by Emmen engineers when the FFA project was continued. Eventually, neither of the aircraft came into production, although the wings of the P-16 were later used in the development of the successful Learjet.

The Eidgenössische Flugzeugwerke Emmen N-20 was a semi-tailless swept wing jet similar to the U.S. Navy's Vought F7U Cutlass with four engines mounted internally in the wings, fold-out canards to improve its aerodynamics at slow speeds, and a maximum designed airspeed of 1,200 km/h (750 mph), a remarkable velocity for an aircraft of the early 1950s. The FFA P-16 was a single-engine straight-wing aircraft for which a contract for production of 100 aircraft was awarded in 1958, but after the second crash of a pre-production model, the order was canceled. The aircraft had met all Swiss Air Force requirements for an STOL attack fighter capable of carrying heavy loads, and the crash was widely considered a pretext for the Swiss parliament to reverse itself. In addition, by the middle of 1958, influenced by NATO concepts, the LVK had redefined the Swiss doctrine of air power from close air support to counter-air operations. Further, the strategic concepts governing Swiss defense doctrine had shifted to a dynamic (mobile) defense that included execution of air missions beyond the Swiss border and the possibility of carrying nuclear weapons, for neither of which the P–16 was suitable. In this time, the Swiss Air Force also tested a few from the Swiss industry-developed Ground to Air Defence Systems but didn't introduce any of them into service (see: 35 mm anti aircraft tank B22L, RSD 58 and RSE Kriens (Missile)). Also a Mobile Ground to Air Defence System based on the Swiss wheeled APC Mowag Shark equipped with the French Crotale (missile) was not bought for the Swiss Air Force.

=== Mirage affair ===
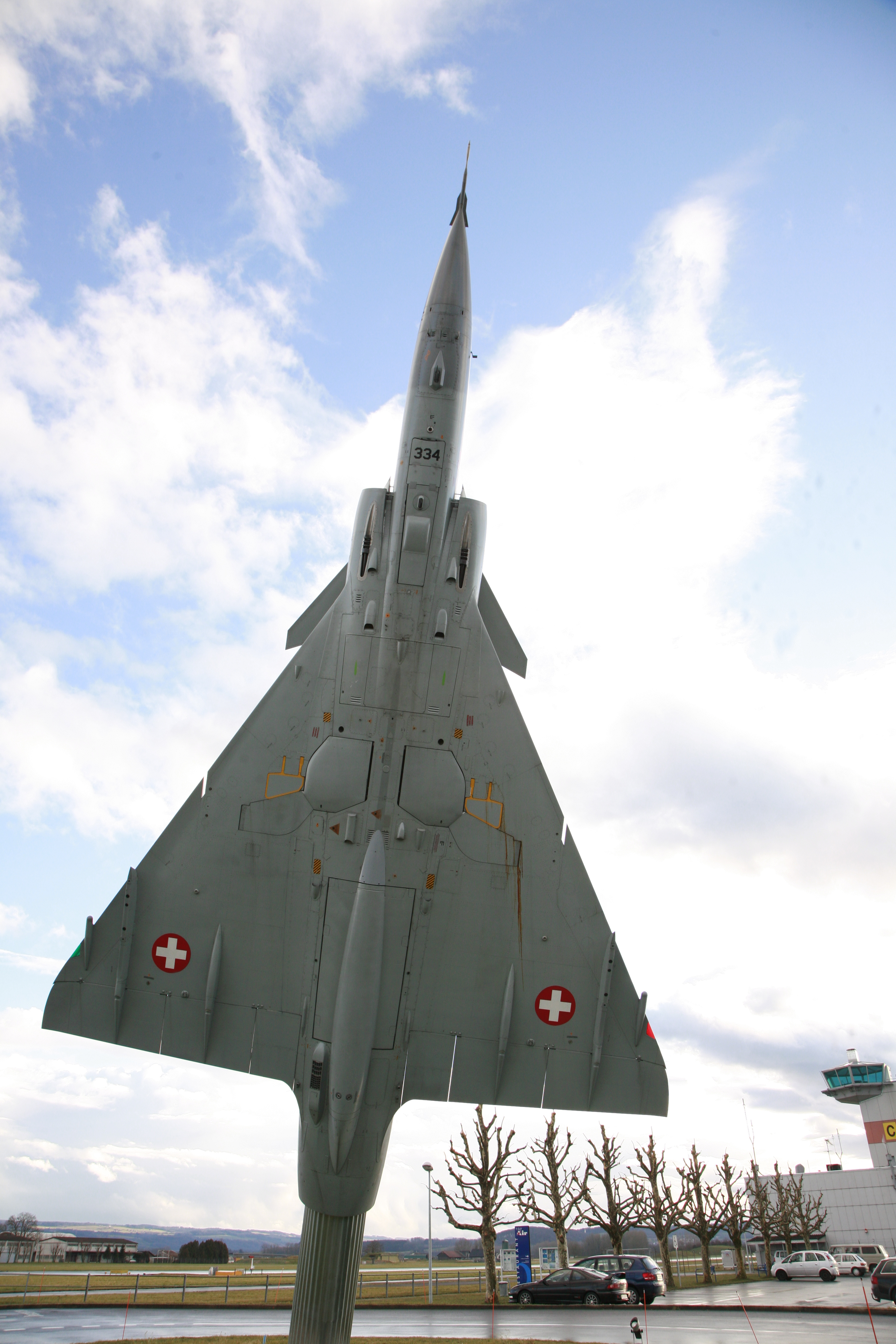
Static display Mirage IIIS gate guard at Payerne Air Base

The acquisition of the Hunter had solved part of the Swiss dilemma of needing to support both its ground forces and to deploy an air-to-air capability, but while the Hunter could provide some counter-air defense over a battlefield and escort ground-support fighters it was not supersonic nor was it capable of defending Swiss airspace. In 1961, the Swiss Parliament voted to procure 100 French Dassault Mirage IIICs for this purpose and 67 BL-64 Bloodhound surface-to-air missiles from the British.

The Swiss acquired a single Mirage for testing, as a preface to production under license of 100 Dassault Mirage IIIS interceptors, with strengthened wings, airframe, and undercarriage. Avionics would differ as well, with the Thomson-CSF Cyrano II radar replaced by the Hughes Electronics TARAN-18 system, to provide the Mirage IIIS compatibility with the AIM-4 Falcon air-to-air missile. The Mirage IIIS was intended to be operated as an interceptor, ground attack, and reconnaissance aircraft, using wing pods for the photographic mission.

Production of the Mirage IIIS developed into a scandal. Although the Air Force staff wanted to acquire the best available aircraft on the market, neither it nor the Federal Council had issued performance specifications. The concept of mobile defense had replaced static defense, such as the Réduit strategy of World War II, as the doctrine of the Swiss Armed Forces. The new doctrine required greater numbers of long-range aircraft and tanks in order to combat Soviet troops before they arrived near the Swiss border. The committee on aircraft procurement, which consisted of two military officers and an engineer who was employed by the army, originally proposed "at least 100 Mirages" to be employed in a multi-role capacity.

The parliament first authorized approximately 871 million Swiss francs to build 100 Mirage IIIS under license. But this procurement was soon crushed under massive budget overruns and the government asked for an additional CHF 576 million. The cost overruns were the result of fitting U.S. electronics to the French platform, installing hardpoints for moving the aircraft inside of the caverns by cranes, structural reinforcements for jet-assisted takeoffs, and other extras to improve the off-the-shelf Mirage IIIC. The wish to procure the Mirage IIIS was also boosted by the possibility that the Swiss could acquire aircraft-delivered nuclear weapons, either from France or by producing them themselves.

However, another major reason for rising costs was the need to develop a separate variant for the photo-reconnaissance mission when the underwing pods caused too great a performance penalty. The differences between the IIIS and the IIIRS (as the reconnaissance version was designated) resulted in only 36 Mirage IIIS fighters and 18 IIIRS reconnaissance aircraft actually built by the Federal Aircraft Factory at Emmen. Twelve were allocated to a reconnaissance squadron, three to a training group and the rest to two fighter squadrons. It was found that such a small number was insufficient to provide the multi-role capacity deemed essential for the new doctrine. The Mirage IIIS went into service in 1967, and the IIIRS in 1969.

The lack of financial oversight and the apparent ease with which Federal Councillor Paul Chaudet and Chief of the General Staff Jakob Annasohn chose the Mirage (at the time, the world's fastest jet fighter) led, for the first time in Swiss history, to the formation of a parliamentary fact-finding commission. As a result, parliamentary oversight on military procurements was improved and the military was given the organizational and professional structures to avoid such budget overruns. One Air Force officer had to retire, and Annasohn himself retired voluntarily in the end of 1964, followed by Chaudet who stepped down in 1966.

== Later Cold War history ==
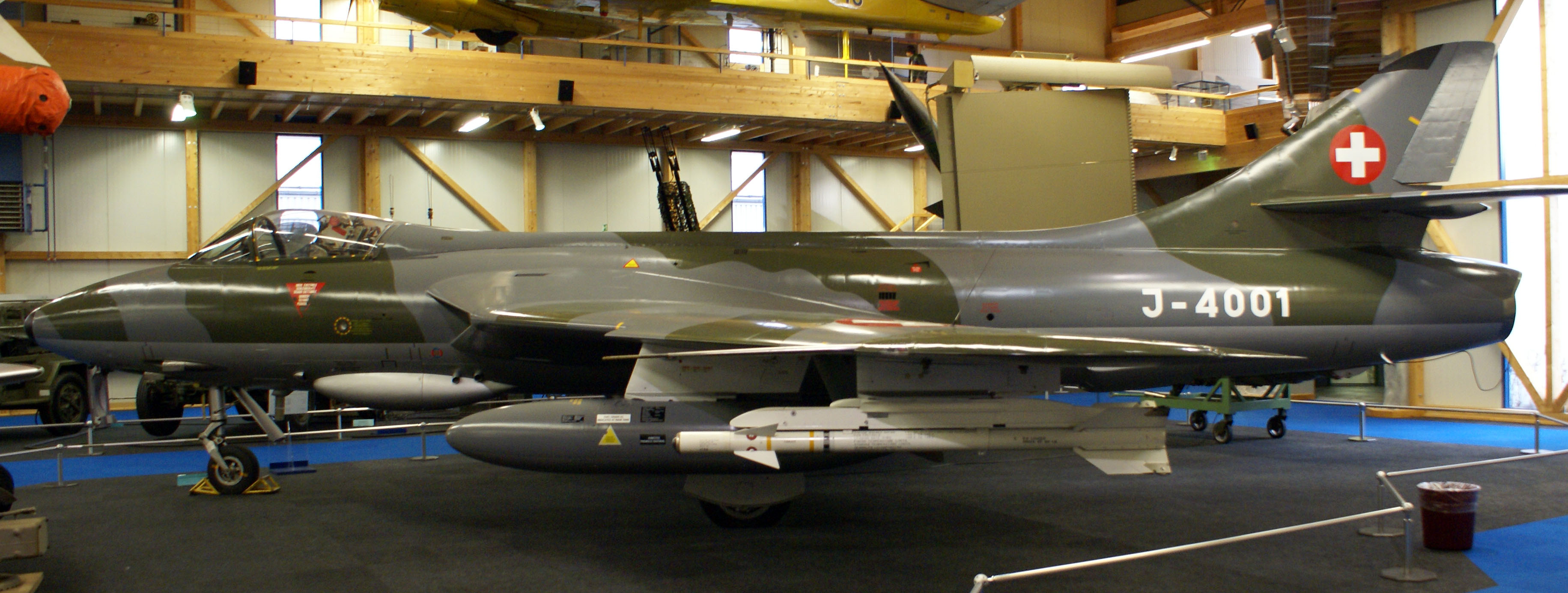
J-4001, Hawker Hunter Mk 58 strike fighter in service from 1958 to 1994

In 1972, with the option of nuclear weapons discarded and the likelihood of operations beyond the Swiss border severely restricted, the Federal Military Department (EMD) decided that the next generation of aircraft acquired by the Swiss Air Force would be for close air support. While resurrection of the P-16 was discussed in the Swiss press (FFA had continued theoretical development the aircraft at its own expense, with its final variant, the AR-7, to be equipped with a Rolls-Royce RB168-25 engine), the choice narrowed to the Milan (a joint Swiss-French prototype variant of the Mirage III) and the American A-7G Corsair II, each of which had strong advocates within the Swiss Air Force.

Still reeling from the "Mirage affair", when the Milan project failed from lack of orders and the recommendation for purchase of the A-7 was cancelled, the Air Force instead purchased 30 additional, surplus Hawker Hunters in 1973 to improve its ground attack capability (the small number of Mirages were reserved for reconnaissance and interceptor roles). At this time the Swiss aviation industry and the ETH Zurich made a last attempt for a Swiss made fighter jet, the ALR Piranha but they had no success. And it remained an unfinished project.

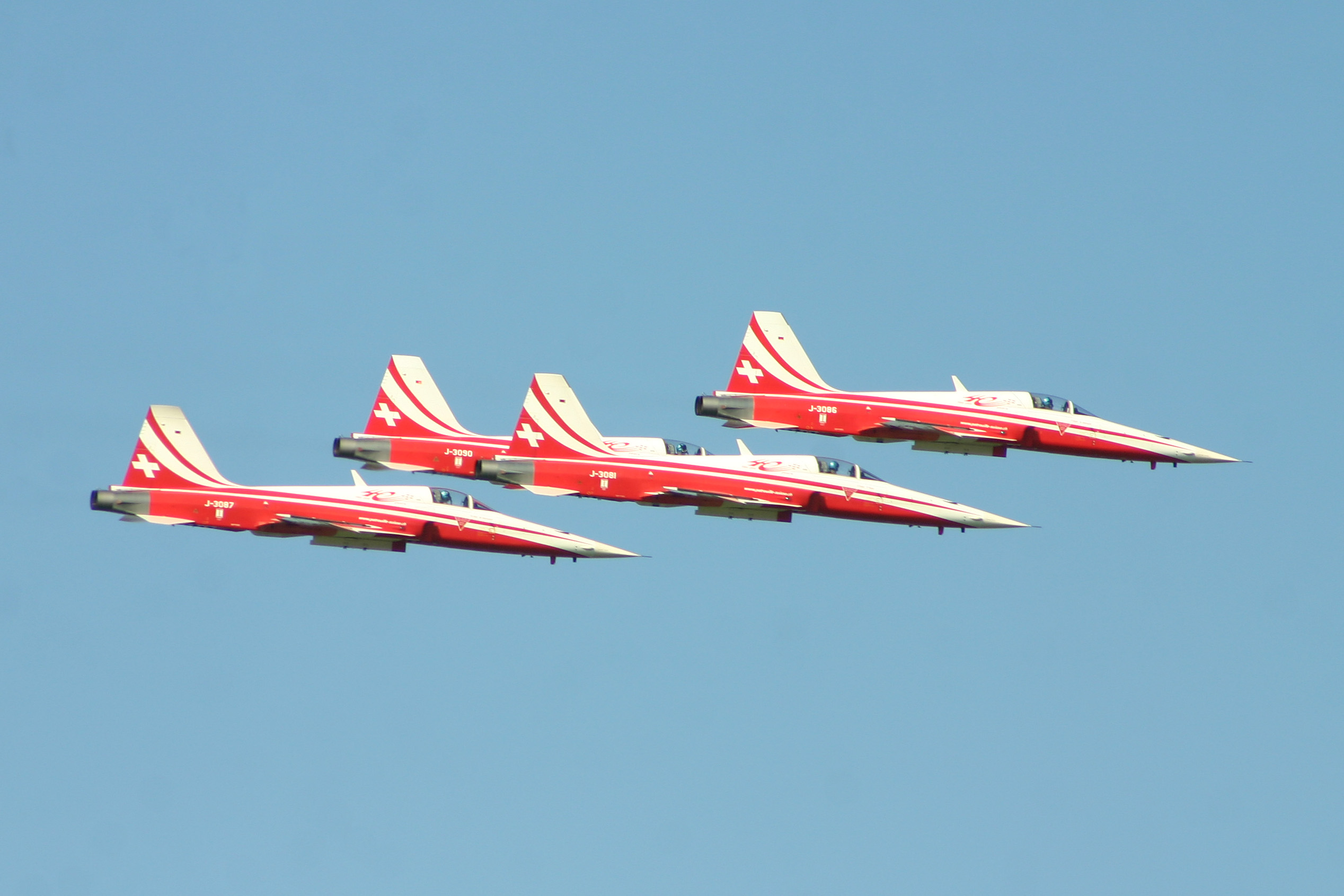
F-5E Tigers of the Patrouille Suisse

The end of the 1970s saw the introduction of the Northrop F-5 Tiger II. The F-5 won the competition against the F-4 Phantom II, Dassault Mirage F1 and Saab 37 Viggen, after the Hawker Siddeley Harrier, the Fiat G.91Y and the A-4N Skyhawk passed out the contest before the flight evaluation. In 1976 the Federal Council ordered 72 aircraft, all of which were delivered by 1979. A follow-up order for 38 in 1981 brought the totals to 98 single-seat F-5E and 12 two-seat F-5F, which were deployed in five squadrons headquartered at Dübendorf. Initially the Tigers were responsible for air sovereignty below 30,000 feet (9,100 m), but some also took on a ground attack mission as the Hawker Hunters were phased out.

In 1985 the Mirage IIIS fleet, nearing 20 years of operational service, began a major upgrade program to improve the capabilities of the aircraft. The interceptors were retro-fitted with canards manufactured by Israeli Aircraft Industries on the air intakes to improve maneuverability and stability at landing speeds, new avionics and countermeasures, and redesignated the Mirage IIIS C.70.

Meanwhile, the lengthy nature of the Swiss aircraft procurement process, reinforced by the embarrassments of the Mirage Affair, resulted in the simultaneous acquisition of a new fighter to eventually replace the Mirage. The Swiss considered the Dassault Rafale, Dassault Mirage 2000, the IAI Lavi, the Northrop F-20 Tigershark, and the BAE Systems/Saab JAS-39 Gripen fighters before choosing the McDonnell Douglas F/A-18 Hornet and General Dynamics F-16 Fighting Falcon for a fly-off evaluation held in May 1988. From that competition, the Federal Council chose the Hornet in October 1988. The Hornets were to be virtually "off-the-shelf" models, nearly identical to those operated by the U.S. Navy but with stronger titanium alloy frames for an anticipated 30-year service life.

However the competition was reopened in 1990 to allow for a reconsideration of a European fighter, the Mirage 2000-5. In June 1991 the choice of the Hornet was reconfirmed, and the political struggle to have its purchase approved by referendum began. In the meantime, the Soviet Union was dissolved, and with its dissolution the Cold War ended.

=== Overseas training ===
A small contingent of Hawker Hunters deployed to Sweden in 1965 for training in air-to-ground delivery of ordnance, and intermittently thereafter, but annual training abroad for the Swiss Air Force did not begin until 1985. The use of Swiss air space for combat training became increasingly impractical as the performance of supersonic jets increased and created environmental restrictions. The Swiss modified their traditional stance of neutrality to seek other facilities, particularly among NATO European members, to meet their training needs.

The first annual training exercise was acronymed SAKA (SArdinien KAmpagne), first begun 3 January 1985. It was conducted at the Air Weapons Training Installation (AWTI) at Decimomannu Air Base on Sardinia, at the time the only such facility outside of the United States. Up to 18 Swiss Mirages and Tigers per year conducted air combat maneuvering training on its instrumentation range. Following its fifth SAKA exercise in 1989, however, demands by NATO air forces for the facility resulted in permission for Swiss Air Force usage to be withdrawn.

When its SAKA exercise set for June 1990 had to be cancelled, the Swiss Air Force began a new training program at RAF Waddington in the United Kingdom, which it called NORKA (NORdsee KAmpagne). A newly built Air Combat Maneuvering Instrumentation (ACMI) range operated by British Aerospace provided it with a facility with which to conduct realistic combat training against other aircraft, and it began the first of twelve annual exercises on 16 November 1990.

== Post-Cold War developments ==
=== Changes in doctrine ===
With the end of the Cold War, the probability of a ground invasion of Switzerland ended, substantially changing Swiss military doctrine and resulting in reduction of both the budget and the size of the Swiss Armed Forces. In Armed Forces Reform 95, and its supporting program Defense Guidelines 95, the Air Force retained its basic structure and organization, but became a totally independent service, now called the Swiss Air Force, on 1 January 1996. For the first time since its inception, subordination of the counter-air role to the ground support mission ended, and defense of domestic airspace was made its highest priority and primary task.

In addition, the Air Force was tasked with gathering intelligence, air reconnaissance, and air transport. Support of ground troops, both doctrinally and as a practical matter, became marginal. These missions were strongly influenced by a shrinking capability, since its combat aircraft could operate by daylight only, its anti-aircraft artillery was obsolete, and the FLORIDA radar system had reached the limits of operational effectiveness. The retirement of the Hawker Hunters in 1994 ended its ground support capability, and a cut of one-third from the defence budget meant that plans for a second purchase of F/A-18s and supporting air-to-ground weapons (the reason the multi-capable Hornet was selected) had to be canceled, leaving both it and the F-5s in a strictly air-to-air role.

Almost immediately the Air Force was reduced from 290 to 190 fixed-wing aircraft and had five of its twelve bases closed. In 2002, the Armée XXI reforms continued the pattern of reduction, with bases at Mollis, Turtmann, and Interlaken closed, jets relocated out of Dübendorf (later planned for closing), and the helicopter base at Alpnach placed on the closure list. These closures left Payerne, Sion, and Meiringen as the only combat bases, Emmen as the main helicopter base, and Locarno as a training base. Buochs was maintained for war-time reactivation, and the theoretical plan for using highways near Payerne, Sion, and Lodrino as emergency runways was retained, although no pilots have been trained in their use since the mid-1980s.

=== New jets and political struggles ===
In 1993, a popular initiative that sought to stop the procurement of the 34 F/A-18 Hornets (chosen by the Federal Council in 1988) to replace the Mirages was defeated by a majority of 57%. Two versions, a two-seat D-model and a single-seat C, were built in the United States and flight-tested in 1996, delivered in December 1996 and 1998 respectively. Thirty-two production kits were shipped to Switzerland for assembly, with the first in service in January 1997 and the final aircraft delivered in December 1999. One crashed during workups, leaving 28 C's and 5 Ds assigned to three squadrons. Seven instructor pilots were trained at NAS Cecil Field, Florida, and the United States Navy also provided two instructors on exchange to train Hornet pilots.

In 1990, the Swiss Air Force acquired 20 British Aerospace Hawk Mk.66s to provide an interim solution to its jet training requirements, but these were retired in 2003 and sold to Finland. The Mirages ended their service in the second half of the 1990s, with the last Mirage fighter retired in 1999 and the final Mirage reconnaissance jet in December 2003.

Since 1993 the Swiss Air Force has faced continuing challenges from left-wing and environmental lobbies regarding its existence, policy, and operations. On 24 February 2008, an initiative to ban the training flights of jet aircraft over tourist areas of Switzerland (virtually the entire nation) to reduce the impact of noise pollution, which had been publicly debated since the delivery of the F/A-18 (which referendum initiator Franz Weber termed "oversized, ineffective, and ruinous"), was defeated by a vote of 68.1%.

When the Hunters were retired in 1994, the air force made an effort to provide some F-5 Tigers with an air-to-ground capability but this proved prohibitively expensive, and plans to replace the fleet after 2010 with a fourth-generation jet fighter were begun. A dozen F-5s were leased in 2004 to Austria for four years (while it awaited the delivery of new Eurofighters), and the Swiss maintenance of its fleet was such that they were considered "low-hours" by the U.S. Navy, which purchased 36 in 2006–2008 to replace its aging Aggressor aircraft. This effectively reduced the F-5 inventory by half, and proposals to replace the Tigers with JAS-39 Gripens, Rafales, EADS Eurofighter Typhoons, or the advanced Super Hornet variant of the FA-18 came under consideration. In the end the JAS-39 Gripen was chosen because it was the cheapest candidate. The purchase was rejected by 53.4% of Swiss voters in a national referendum on 18 May 2014.

Overseas training continued with the annual NORKA exercises through 2001, when NORKA was discontinued in favor of NOMAD (North Sea Operations for Mutual Air Defence), a multi-nation ACMI training exercise held annually at RAF Waddington, which Swiss contingents began attending in 2000. Training in night operations, called NIGHTWAY, began in 1998 at Ørland MAS, Norway, and continued annually except for 1999 and 2005. Training abroad with NATO nations reflected the changing realities of neutrality, also reflected in 1997 by the discontinuation of the Swiss "Bambini Code" in favor of the NATO Brevity Code. The first female Swiss fighter pilot, 1st Lt. Fanny Cholet, was cleared to fly the F/A-18 in February 2019.

Until late 2020, the aviator corps however was incapable of maintaining a matching state of readiness due to limited budget and lack of staff available and was operated from 06:00-22:00 local time only. This became painfully clear as the Swiss Air Force was unable to respond to the Ethiopian Airlines ET702 hijacking in February 2014 which occurred outside routine operating hours. Agreements with Italy and France in particular enabled fighters from both air forces to enter Swiss airspace to handle the threat. The aim for a 24-hour Quick Reaction Alert readiness of two armed F/A-18 fighters was achieved on 31 December 2020.

== Previous aircraft ==
Image	Aircraft	Origin	Type	Version(s)	Number	Entered service	WFU	Notes
	Aérospatiale Alouette II	France	observation, rescue & liaison	II	30	1958	1992	10 bought in 1958, and 20 in 1964.
	Aérospatiale Alouette III	France	transport & trainer	III	84	1964	2010	14 lost in accidents. Replaced by EC635.
	BAE Hawk	UK	trainer	T.66	19	1987	2002	One lost in 1990. 18 sold to the Finland in 2008.
	Beechcraft Expeditor	US	transport	C18S, C-45F	3	1948	1969	
	Beechcraft Twin Bonanza	US	transport	E50	3	1957	1989	
	BFW M.18	Germany	transport	18C & 18D	4	1929	1954	1 18C, 3 18D.
	Bücker Jungmann	Germany	trainer	Bü 131	94	1936	1971	Two-seat biplane. 10 impressed from aero clubs.
	Bücker Jungmeister	Germany	trainer	Bü 133	52	1937	1968	Acrobatics/air combat training single-seat biplane.
	Comte AC-1	Switzerland	fighter	AC-1	1	1928	1939	
	Comte AC-4	Switzerland	liaison	AC-4	1	1931	1938	
	Comte AC-11-V	Switzerland	liaison	AC-11-V	1	1943	1945	
	Dassault Falcon	France	VIP transport	50	1	1996	2013	Replaced by Dassault Falcon 900EX.
	Dassault Mirage III	France	experimental	IIIC	1	1962	1999	
	Dassault Mirage III	France	reconnaissance	IIIRS	18	1964	2003	
	Dassault Mirage III	France	fighter	IIIS	36	1964	1999	Swiss IIIC, Upgraded by SF Emmen in 1988. Financial scandal reduced orders from 100.
	Dassault Mirage III	France	advanced trainer	IIIBS	4	1964	2003	2 lost in accidents.
	Dassault Mirage III	France	advanced trainer	IIIDS	2	1983	2003	Replaced crashed Mirage IIIBS.
	de Havilland Mosquito	UK	bomber	PR.4 & FB.6	2	1944	1954	1 used by Swissair for pilot training. 2^{nd} was engine testbed for EFW N-20.
	de Havilland Vampire	UK	fighter	F.1	4	1946	1990	First Swiss Air Force jet aircraft. For testing.
	de Havilland Vampire	UK	fighter-bomber	F.6	178	1949	1990	Includes 3 from spare parts.
	de Havilland Vampire	UK	night fighter	NF.10	1	1958	1961	Testing only.
	de Havilland Vampire	UK	trainer	T.55	39	1953	1990	Two-seat trainer, 30 built in Switzerland.
	de Havilland Venom	UK	fighter-bomber	FB.50	126	1954	1984	Improved Vampire with new wings. Swiss FB.50 = RAF FB.1, FB.54 = FB.5.
	de Havilland Venom	UK	reconnaissance	FB.50R	24	1956	1975	Improved Vampire with new wings. Swiss FB.50 = RAF FB.1, FB.54 = FB.5.
	de Havilland Venom	UK	fighter-bomber	FB.54	100	1956	1983	Improved Vampire with new wings. Swiss FB.50 = RAF FB.1, FB.54 = FB.5.
	de Havilland Venom	UK	reconnaissance	FB.54R	8	1980	1987	Improved Vampire with new wings. Swiss FB.50 = RAF FB.1, FB.54 = FB.5.
	Dewoitine D.26	France	trainer	D.26	11	1931	1948	
	Dewoitine D.27	France	fighter	D.27	66	1928	1944	
	Dornier Do 27	Germany	aerial spraying	Do 27H2	7	1958	2005	
	N-20.2 Arbalète	Switzerland	experimental fighter	N-20.2	1	1949	1952	First Swiss designed jet fighter, only 1 test aircraft built.
	N-20.10 Aiguillon	Switzerland	fighter	N-20.10	1	1949	1952	First Swiss designed jet fighter, not in serie produced.
	EKW C-35	Switzerland	reconnaissance	C-35 & 35-1	90	1937	1954	8 built from spares.
	EKW C-36	Switzerland	reconnaissance	C-3603	160	1942	1987	20 converted to target tugs, 40 re-engined with turboprop.
	Eurocopter AS365 Dauphin 2	France	VIP transport	SA.365N	1	2005	2009	Used by the state government
	Fairey Fox	UK	reconnaissance	VI.R	2	1937	1945	
	FFA P-16	Switzerland	ground attack	P-16.04 & P-16 Mk.II	5	1955	1960	Prototypes. Order for 100 cancelled after 2^{nd} crash. 2 returned to FFA.
	Fieseler Fi 156	Germany	transport, observation & ambulance	C-3 Trop	5	1940	1963	Number includes 1 impressed.
	Focke-Wulf Fw 44	Germany	trainer	Fw 44F	1	1945	1953	
	Fokker C.V	Netherlands	reconnaissance	D & E	64	1927	1954	
	Häfeli DH-1	Switzerland	reconnaissance	DH-1	6	1916	1919	
	Häfeli DH-3	Switzerland	reconnaissance	DH-3	109	1917	1939	
	Häfeli DH-5	Switzerland	reconnaissance	DH-5	80	1922	1940	
	Hanriot HD-1	France	fighter	HD-1	16	1921	1930	
	Hawker Hunter	UK	fighter-bomber	F.58	100	1958	1994	Swiss F.58=RAF F.6, FB.58A=FGA.9, T.68=T.66. Final assembly at Emmen. 3 batches, some converted ex-RAF F.6s.
	Hawker Hunter	UK	fighter-bomber	F.58A	52	1971	1994	Swiss F.58=RAF F.6, FB.58A=FGA.9, T.68=T.66. Final assembly at Emmen. 3 batches, some converted ex-RAF F.6s.
	Hawker Hunter	UK	trainer	T.68	8	1974	1994	Swiss F.58=RAF F.6, FB.58A=FGA.9, T.68=T.66. Final assembly at Emmen. 3 batches, some converted ex-RAF F.6s.
	Hiller UH-12	US	battlefield observation	B	3	1952	1962	
	Junkers Ju 52/3m	Germany	transport	Versions	3	1939	1981	Since 1983 museum aircraft at Dübendorf.
	Learjet 35	US	VIP transport	A	2	1987	2006	
	Messerschmitt Bf 108	Germany	liaison	B	18	1938	1959	
	Messerschmitt Bf 109	Germany	fighter	D-1	10	1939	1949	
	Messerschmitt Bf 109	Germany	fighter	E-1 & E-3	89	1939	1948	
	Messerschmitt Bf 109	Germany	fighter	F-4/Z	2	1942	1947	
	Messerschmitt Bf 109	Germany	fighter	G-6 & G-14	16	1944	1947	
	Morane-Saulnier G	France	trainer	G or H	1	1914	1919	
	Morane-Saulnier MS.229	France	trainer	Et2	2	1931	1941	
	Morane-Saulnier MS.406	France	fighter	MS.406	2	1939	1954	Trainer after replaced as fighter in 1948. 17 3801s built from spares after production ended.
	Morane-Saulnier MS.406	France	fighter	3800	82	1940	1954	Trainer after replaced as fighter in 1948. 17 3801s built from spares after production ended.
	Morane-Saulnier MS.406	France	fighter	3801	224	1941	1959	Trainer after replaced as fighter in 1948. 17 3801s built from spares after production ended.
	Morane-Saulnier MS.406	France	fighter	3802	13	1946	1956	Trainer after replaced as fighter in 1948. 17 3801s built from spares after production ended.
	Morane-Saulnier MS.406	France	fighter	3803	1	1947	1956	Trainer after replaced as fighter in 1948. 17 3801s built from spares after production ended.
	Nardi FN.315	Italy	trainer	FN.315	2	1944	1948	
	Nieuport 23	France	trainer	23 C.1	5	1917	1921	
	Nieuport 28	France	fighter	28 C.1	15	1918	1930	
	Nord Norécrin	France	liaison	1201	1	1948	1952	
	Nord Norvigie	France	liaison	NC.850	1	1949	1950	Tested and returned to Nord
	North American P-51 Mustang	US	reconnaissance	P-51B-10	1	1944	1945	Some bought surplus for $4000 US ea.
	North American P-51 Mustang	US	fighter	P-51D	113	1948	1957	Some bought surplus for $4000 US ea.
	North American P-51 Mustang	US	fighter	TP-51D	2	1948	1957	Some bought surplus for $4000 US ea.
	North American P-51 Mustang	US	fighter	F-6	15	1948	1957	Some bought surplus for $4000 US ea.
	North American Harvard	Canada	trainer	Mk.IIB	40	1948	1968	Surplus ex-RCAF (Canadian built).
	Pilatus P-2	Switzerland	trainer	P-2 05 & 06	55	1945	1981	
	Pilatus P-3	Switzerland	trainers	P-3	73	1956	1995	Number includes prototype.
	Piper Super Cub	US	observation	PA-18-150	6	1948	1975	
	Potez 25	France	reconnaissance	L-25 A.2	17	1927	1940	
	Potez 63	France	bomber	630 & 633	2	1938	1944	
	Rockwell Grand Commander	US	mapping	680FL	1	1976	1993	Civil registered for Federal Office of Topography.
	Siebel Si 204	Germany	transport	D-1	1	1945	1955	Interned.
	Stinson Sentinel	US	liaison	L-5	1	1944	1945	
	Sud-Ouest Djinn	France	trainer	S.O.1221	4	1958	1964	Returned to manufacturer following rotor problems.
	Weber-Landolf-Münch WLM-1	Switzerland	glider	WLM-1	2	1951	unk	

== Closed Air Force bases ==
- Ambri (LSPM)
- Ems GR
- Frutigen
- Flugplatz Interlaken (LSMI)
- Flugplatz Kägiswil (LSPG)
- Littau
- Mollis
- Münster VS
- Raron (LSTA)
- Reichenbach im Kandertal
- Saanen (LSGK)
- San Vittore GR
- Sankt Stephan BE (LSTS)
- Turtmann (LSMJ)
- Ulrichen
- Zweisimmen (LSTZ)

== See also ==
- Military history of Switzerland
- Swiss military aircraft serials

== Bibliography ==
- Roman Schürmann: Helvetische Jäger. Dramen und Skandale am Militärhimmel. Rotpunktverlag, Zürich 2009, ISBN 978-3-85869-406-5
- Lombardi, Fiona. (2007). The Swiss Air Power: Wherefrom? Whereto?. Vdf Hochschulverslag Language. ISBN 3-7281-3099-0.
