= August Haefeli =

Swiss aircraft designer (1887–1960)

- Born: 29 January 1887; Leuzigen, Bern, Switzerland
- Died: 5 June 1960 (aged 73)
- Occupation: Aircraft designer
- Parent(s): Emil Haefeli; Marie Haefeli-Bärtschi

August Haefeli (Häfeli) (29 January 1887 – 5 June 1960) was a Swiss aircraft designer. Under his direction, 185 aircraft were built, and some were flown by such notable airmen as Walter Mittelholzer, Oskar Bider, Robert Ackermann, and Max Cartier. Haefeli was born in 1887, in Leuzigen, to Emil Haefeli and Marie Haefeli-Bärtschi. After moving to Mümliswil-Ramiswil, he attended school in Balsthal, where his father served as a clerk. He then studied mechanical engineering at the Burgdorf technical center.

From 1912 to 1914 he worked for Henri Farman in Paris, and then in 1914 he was hired on as an engineer at Aerowerke Gustav Otto (Otto Flugmaschinenfabrik in Berlin. From 1915 to 1929 he was chief designer and head of the aircraft construction department at the Eidgenoessische Konstruktionswerkstaette in Thun. Under his leadership, the Häfeli DH-1, Häfeli DH-2, Häfeli DH-3, Häfeli DH-4, Häfeli DH-5 and Militär-Apparat MA-7 were developed. From 1929 to 1947 he was an engineer in Oberdiessbach at Maschinenfabrik Adolf Vogt and in Villeneuve at Construction Mécanique. He then worked as a freelance engineer in Thun until his death in 1960. A memorial stone for Haefeli was erected at the Balsthal baths in Switzerland on 7 June 2019.
