= MA7 =

MA-7 may refer to:

- Massachusetts's 7th congressional district
- U.S. Route 7 in Massachusetts
- Mercury-Atlas 7, a spaceflight of Project Mercury
- Militär-Apparat MA-7, Swiss biplane fighter
