= Panzer 61 =

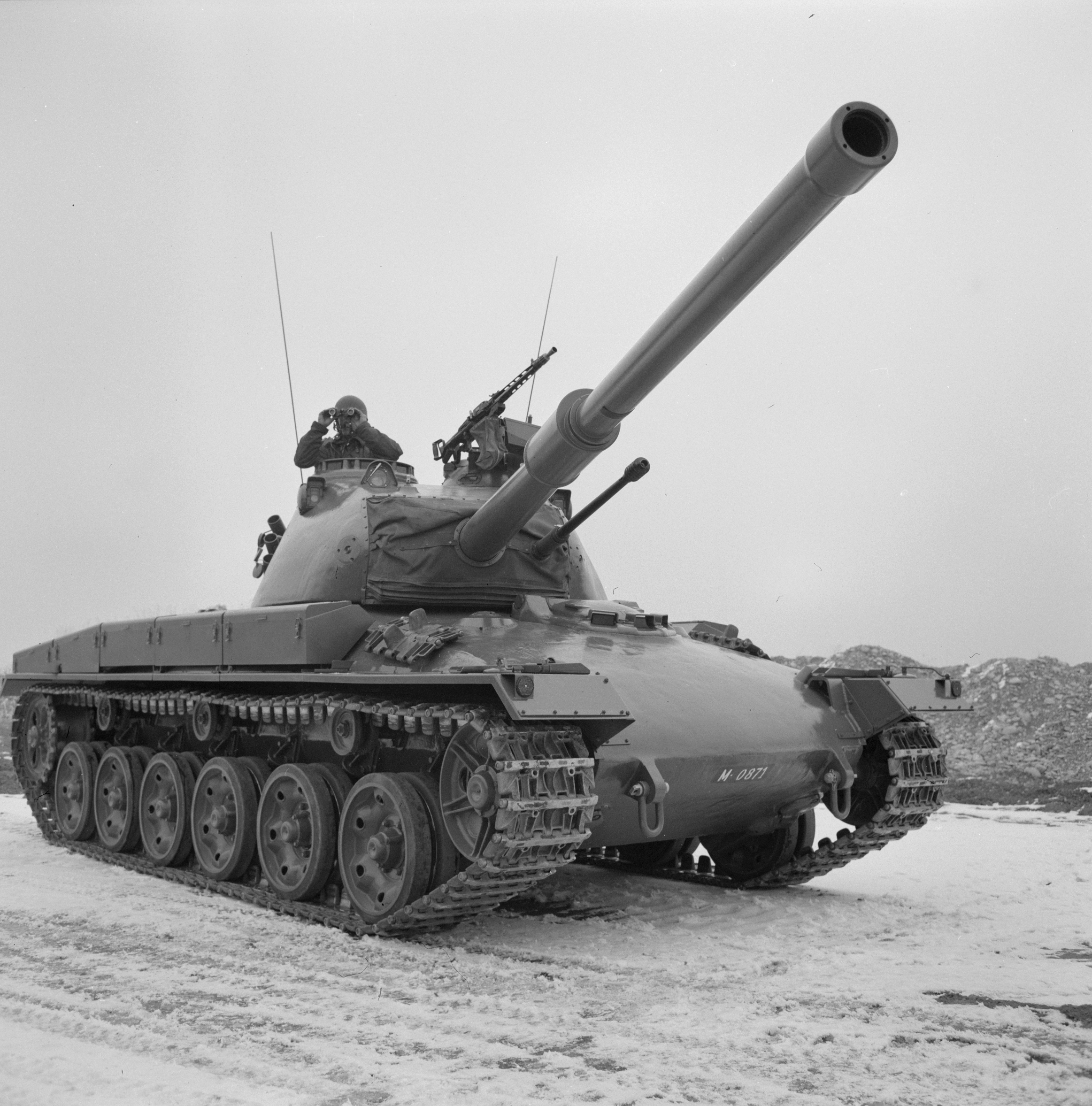
- Early vehicle in 1964
- Type: Main battle tank
- Place of origin: Switzerland

Service history
- In service: 1965–1994
- Used by: Switzerland

Production history
- Designed: 1950s
- Manufacturer: Eidgenössische Konstruktionswerkstätte Thun
- Produced: 1965–1967
- No. built: 150

Specifications
- Mass: 39 tonnes
- Length: 9.45 m (31 ft 0 in)
- Width: 3.06 m (10 ft 0 in)
- Height: 2.72 m (8 ft 11 in)
- Crew: 4
- Armour: up to 120 mm RHA
- Main armament: 105 mm Royal Ordnance L7 rifled gun with 56 rounds
- Secondary armament: 2× 7.5 mm Swiss machine guns with 3200 rounds
- Engine: Mercedes-Benz V-8 diesel engine 630 hp
- Power/weight: 16.15 hp/tonne
- Suspension: belleville washer
- Ground clearance: 400 mm
- Operational range: 250 km (160 mi)
- Maximum speed: 55 km/h (34 mph)

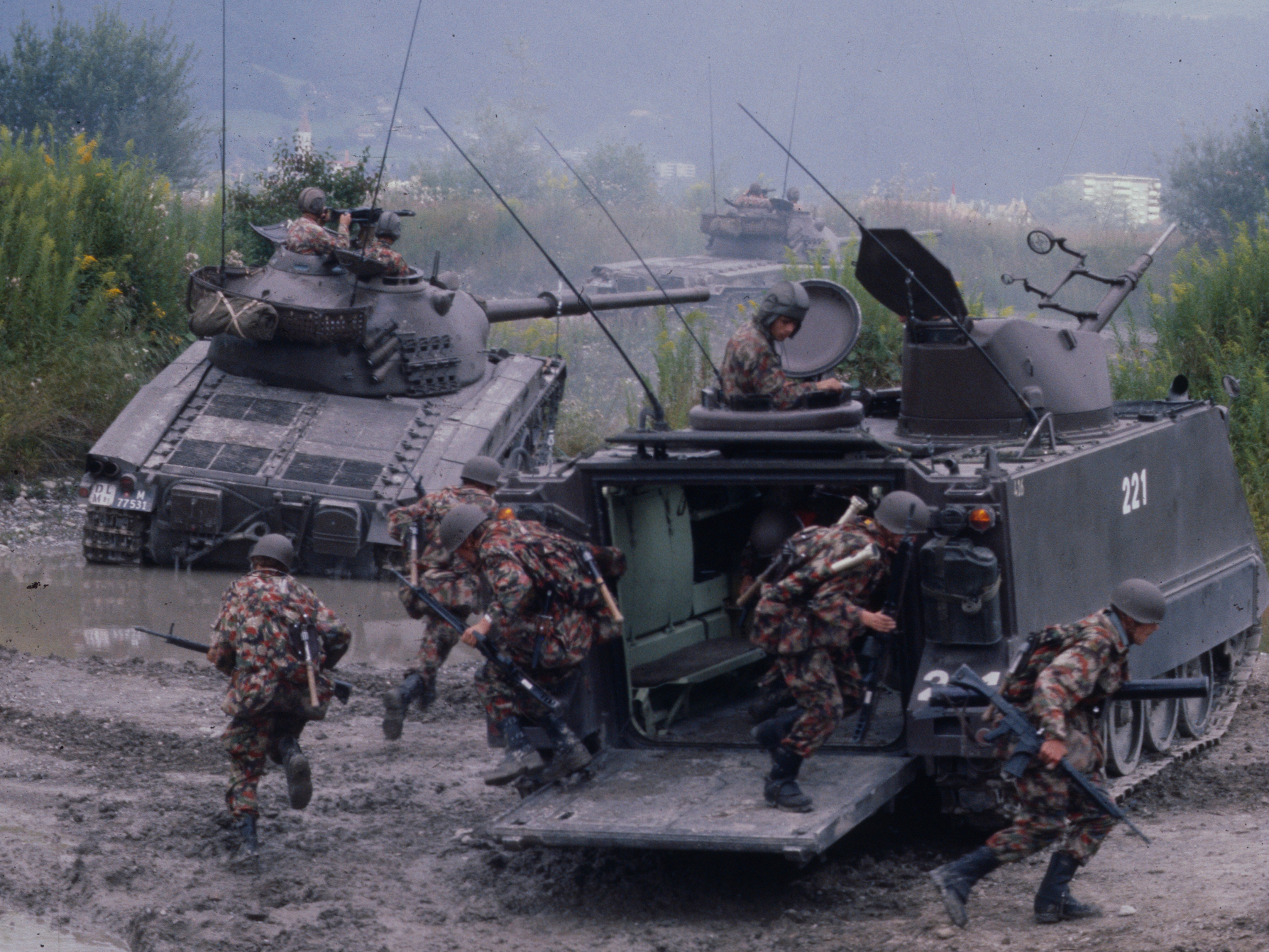
Swiss Armed Forces troops deploy from an M113 during a training exercise at Thun, a Panzer 61 is visible in the background.

The Panzer 61 was a Swiss Cold War era medium tank later reclassified as a second-generation main battle tank. The tank had a weight of 36.5 tons and was powered by a 630 hp diesel engine, which gave it a top road speed of 50 km/h (31 mph). The primary armament of the Panzer 61 was a 105 mm main gun.

== History and Development ==
During the early 1950s the Swiss Army tried to buy modern tanks to reinforce the armoured forces which, due to the war in Korea, proved to be impossible. As a stop-gap solution, the Swiss army purchased AMX-13 light tanks from France and decided to develop a domestic medium tank.

The first prototype and production vehicles were designated Panzer 58. The first Panzer 58 prototype was armed with a domestic 90mm rifled gun, the second Panzer 58 was fitted with a British 84 mm calibre Ordnance QF 20 pounder. and the third prototype as well as the production model was fitted with a Royal Ordnance L7 105mm rifled gun. The Panzer 58 served similarly to a preproduction model of the improved Panzer 61, and in 1961 the Swiss parliament approved production of 150 Panzer 61s. The vehicles were delivered between 1965 and 1967, produced at the Eidgenoessische Konstruktionswerkstaette (today RUAG Land Systems) facility at Thun.

== Service life ==
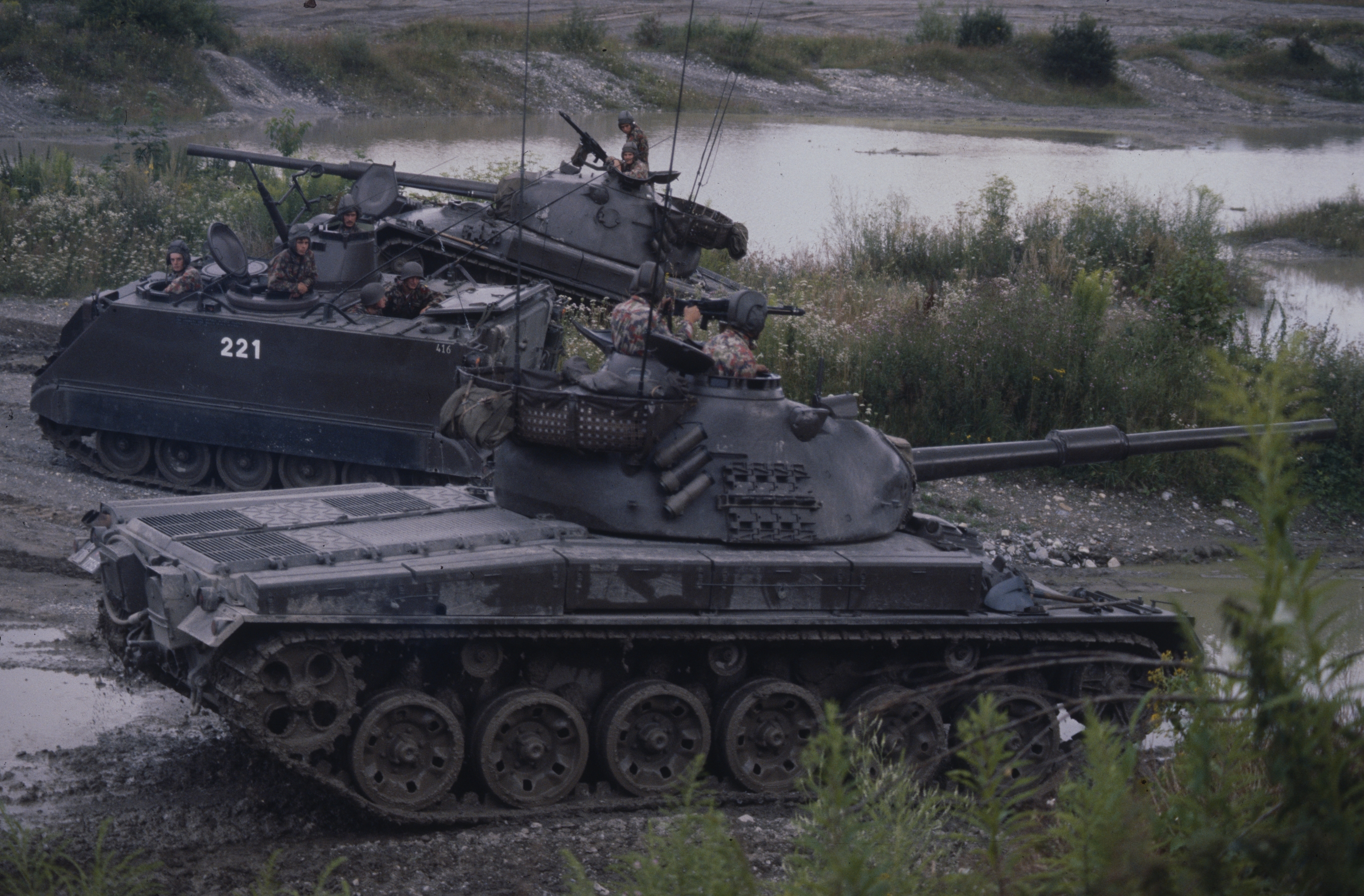
Swiss Panzer 61 tanks during field exercises in 1979.

The vehicle would serve for nearly thirty years with the Swiss Armed Forces. A replacement effort would be the pursued in 1967, with the purchase of 150 Panzer 68 tanks, although the effort was not wholly successful due to several glaring issues with the new vehicle. From 1967 onwards, Panzer 61 vehicles were upgraded and retrofitted with technology found on the more advanced Panzer 68. The Panzer 61's original coaxial 20 mm autocannon was found to have no use in practice and was replaced by a coaxial 7.5 mm machine gun in the Panzer 61 AA9 variant. Panzer 61 would never serve in combat but examples remained in service well up until the production and commission of Panzer 87 and, although relegated to secondary duties, would serve up until the final units were reequipped with Panzer 87s in 1994.

== Legacy ==
The chassis formed the basis of the Panzerkanone 68 self-propelled gun, the prototype of the Entpannungspanzer 65 armoured recovery vehicle, and for the initial prototype of the Brückenlegepanzer 68. Wheels and tracks from the Panzer 61 were also used on the Zielfahrzeug 68.

A number of Panzer 61s have survived in museums and private collections including The Tank Museum.
