= Zielfahrzeug 68 =

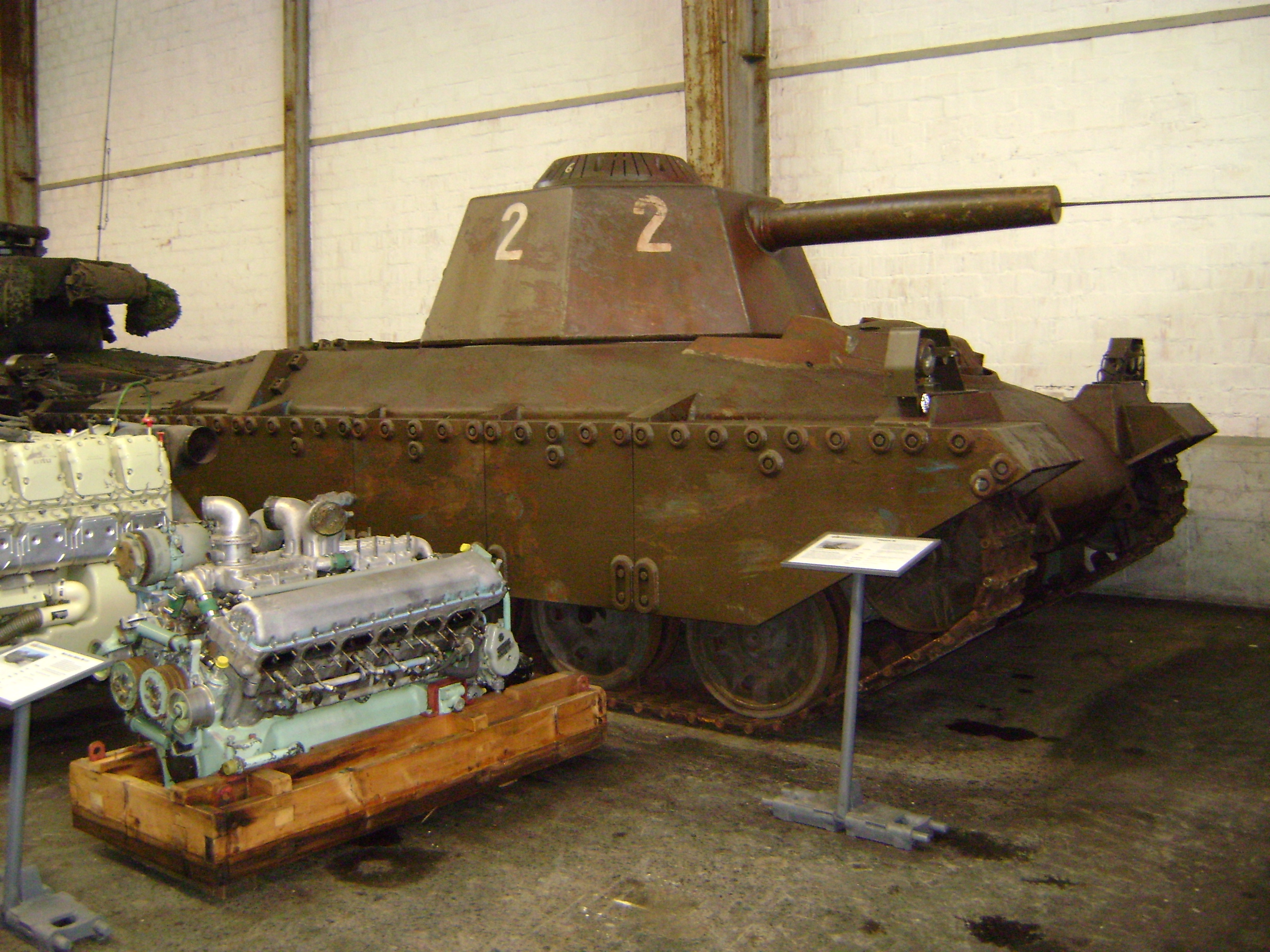
- Zielfahrzeug 68 at Military Museum Full
- Type: Target Tank
- Place of origin: Switzerland

Service history
- In service: 1974 - 2007
- Used by: Switzerland

Production history
- Designed: 1972
- Manufacturer: Eidgenössische Konstruktionswerkstätte Thun
- Produced: 1972 - 1974
- No. built: 10

Specifications
- Mass: 36.0 tonnes
- Length: 9.49 m (374 in)
- Width: 3.14 m (124 in)
- Height: 2.72 m (107 in)
- Crew: 1
- Armour: up to 80 mm Steelpanels
- Main armament: No
- Secondary armament: No
- Engine: 8 cylinder V90 ° engine four stroke MTU MB837 auxiliary motor 4 cylinder engine Mercedes Benz OM 636; 660 hp, 38 hp
- Suspension: cup springs in swing
- Maximum speed: 55 km/h (34 mph), off-road 35 km/h (22 mph)

The Zielfahrzeug 68 ("Target tank 68") was a decommissioned Panzer 68, which was converted to the target vehicle role. A total of ten of these vehicles were in use.

== Conversion ==
The Swiss Army ordered from the company Eidgenoessische Konstruktionswerkstaette "K + W Thun" ten of these vehicles, which were produced between 1972 and 1974. The turret was removed and replaced by a steel tower with additional welded steel plates. Wheels and tracks came from the Panzer 61. The tracks were protected by easily replaceable steel side protection plates, which were fixed with screws. As extra protection, steel aprons were attached on the side. The surface was provided with a welded-steel thickening, the drivers hatch was strengthened and provided with 360 ° slotted sights. The whole tactical equipment was removed, under the tower a platform made from aluminum was installed. The tower had a hatch of the same type as the driver's hatch. The tank was usually only used with one crew member, the driver, although there was enough space for an observer or a commander. Tower and driver positions were connected, so in case of a jammed driver's hatch, the driver could exit the tank through the hatch in the tower.

== Concept of operations ==
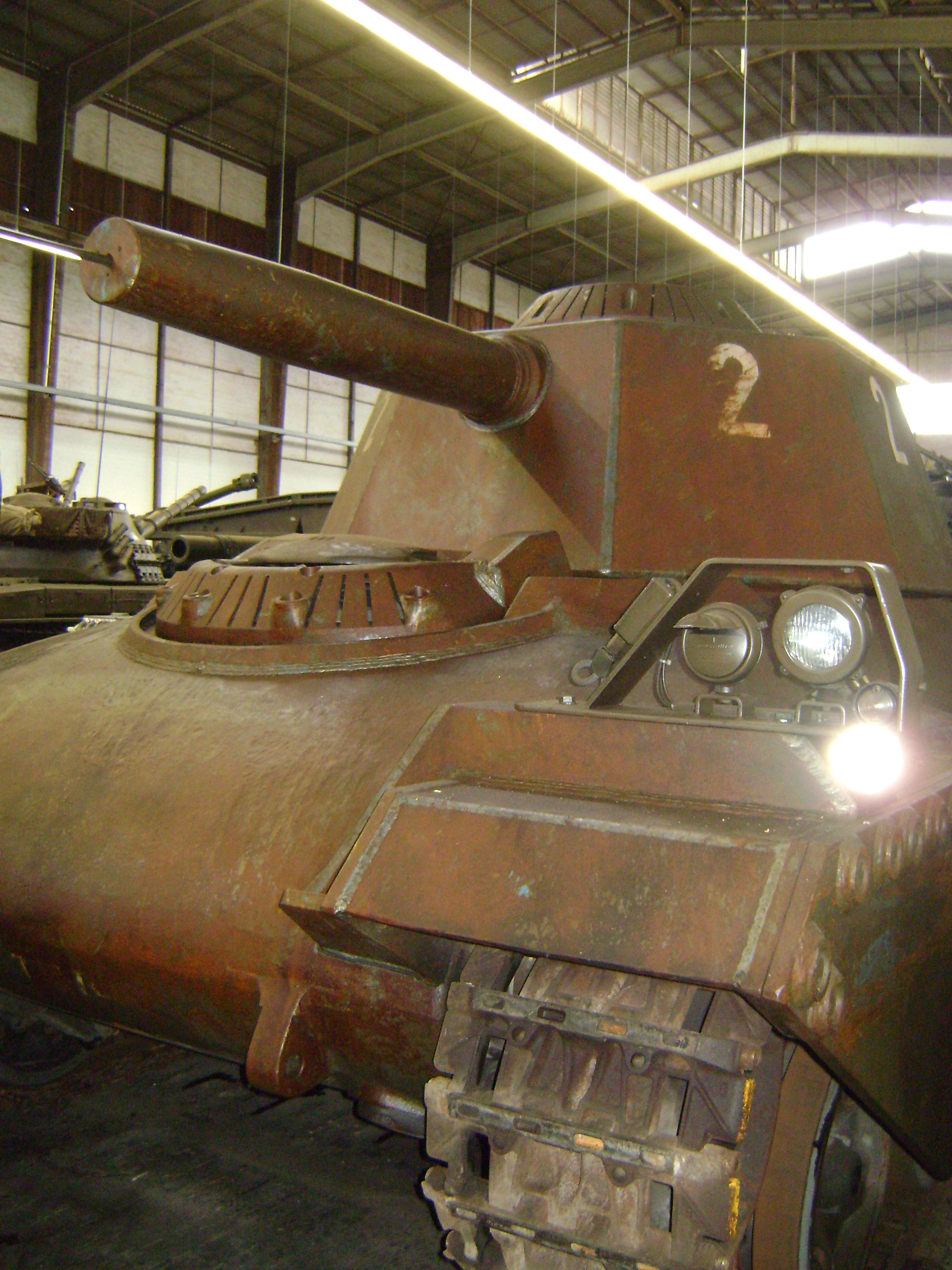
Zielfahrzeug 68 moving target tank

The target 68 tanks were used as moving target for the training firing of the anti-tank guided weapon "M47 Dragon" American-made anti-tank missile. The vehicles carried the identification numbers (M-numbers) "M77870" - "M77879" and were from 1974 to 2007 in the service of the Swiss Army. The tank with the number "M77876" was stationed on the shooting range Les Rochat and is now in the Military Museum Full. The vehicles were driven usually by members of the Army motor vehicle park (civilian employees of the Military), not from Military tank troops. It was used together with the Mowag 4x4 armored reconnaissance vehicle (armored dummy)

- Consumption = 200 L/100 km road, 440 L/100 km off road
