= Häfeli DH-1 =

1910s Swiss reconnaissance aircraft

DH-1
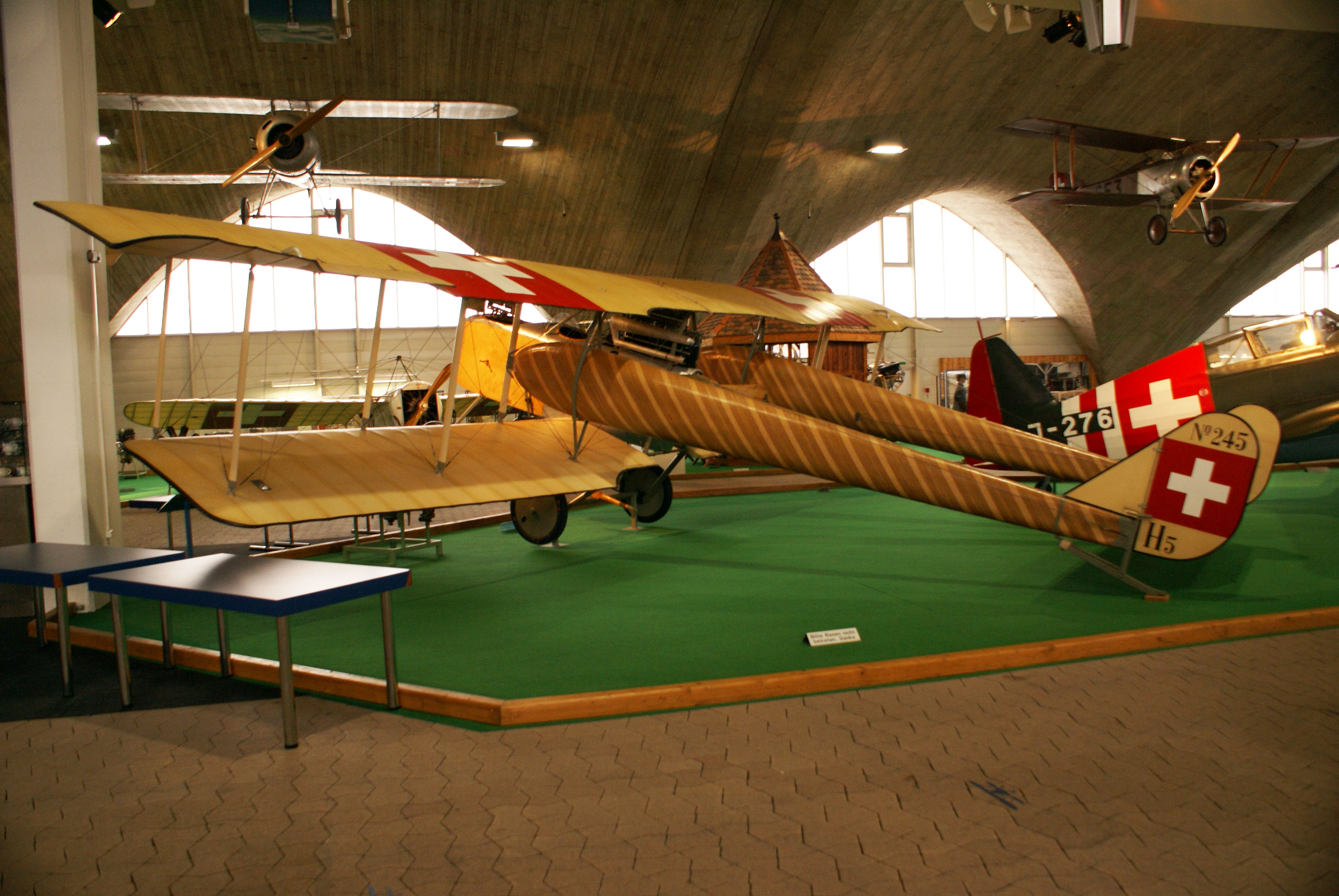

General information
- Type: Reconnaissance biplane
- Manufacturer: K+W
- Designer: August Häfeli
- Primary user: Swiss Air Force
- Number built: 6

History
- Introduction date: 1916
- First flight: 1916
- Retired: 1919

The Häfeli DH-1 was a 1910s Swiss two-seat reconnaissance aircraft, built by the aircraft department of the Federal Construction Works (Eidgenoessische Konstruktionswerkstaette, K+W) at Thun, Switzerland.

== Development and design ==
In 1915 K + W set up their aircraft department and employed August Haefeli as chief engineer. Häfeli had previously designed the AGO C.I and AGO C.II, German reconnaissance biplanes. His first design was the Häfeli DH-1, similar in concept to his designs for AGO Flugzeugwerke. The DH-1 was a three-bay biplane of wood and fabric construction, it had a fuselage pod with tandem seating for the two-man crew and twin booms mounting the tail. The DH-1 was powered by an Argus As II engine built under licence by Buhler Brothers Limited. Six aircraft were built.

== Operational history ==
Six DH-1s were built during 1916 but within a year three had been destroyed in accidents. The survivors were withdrawn from service in 1919 and scrapped.

Two DH-1 during the First World War

== Operators ==
Switzerland

- Swiss Air Force

== Specifications (DH-1) ==
Data from The Illustrated Encyclopedia of Aircraft (Part Work 1982–1985)

General characteristics

- Crew: 2
- Length: 8.82 m (28 ft 11 in)
- Wingspan: 12.8 m (42 ft 0 in)
- Height: 3 m (9 ft 10 in)
- Wing area: 38 m^{2} (410 sq ft)
- Empty weight: 750 kg (1,653 lb)
- Gross weight: 1,125 kg (2,480 lb)
- Powerplant: 1 × Argus As II six-cylinder in-line water-cooled piston engine, 89 kW (120 hp)
- Propellers: 2-bladed wooden fixed-pitch pusher propeller

Performance

- Maximum speed: 126 km/h (78 mph, 68 kn)
- Range: 250 km (160 mi, 130 nmi)
- Service ceiling: 9,840 m (32,280 ft)

Armament

- Guns: 1x 7.45 mm (0.293 in) MG 94 machine-gun
