= Panzerkanone 68 =

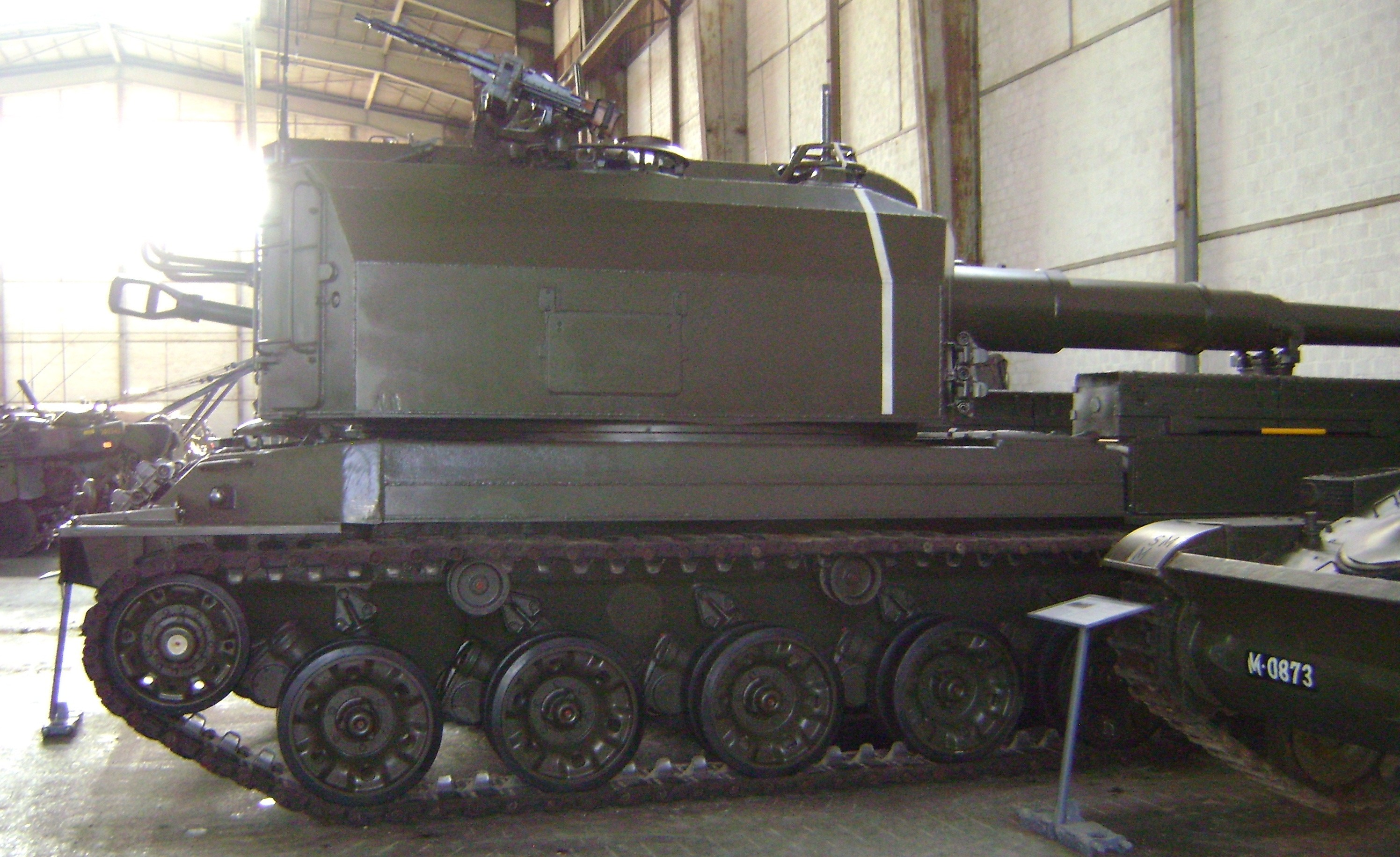
- A preserved Panzerkanone 68
- Type: Self-propelled howitzer
- Place of origin: Switzerland

Service history
- In service: 1972–1975
- Used by: Switzerland

Production history
- Designed: 1966
- Manufacturer: Eidgenössische Konstruktionswerkstätte Thun
- Produced: 1972-1975
- No. built: 4

Specifications
- Mass: 47.0 tonnes
- Length: 12.14 m (39.8 ft); 7.00 m (22.97 ft) (hull only)
- Width: 3.48 m (11.4 ft)
- Height: 3.20 m (10.5 ft)
- Crew: 5
- Armour: up to 120 mm RHA
- Main armament: 155 mm gun 34 rounds
- Secondary armament: 1× 7.5 mm machine gun 3000 round 6× smoke dischargers 12 Smoke Cartridges 51
- Engine: 8 cylinder V90° engine four stroke MTU MB 837 Ba-500 auxiliary motor 4 cylinder engine Mercedes Benz OM 636; 660 hp, 38 hp
- Power/weight: 14 hp/tonne
- Suspension: Torsion bar
- Ground clearance: 400 mm
- Operational range: 300 km (190 mi) (road); 180 km (110 mi) (off-road)
- Maximum speed: 55.5 km/h (34.5 mph)

The Panzerkanone 68 ("Armoured gun 68") is a Swiss self-propelled howitzer produced by the Eidgenoessische Konstruktionswerkstaette (Federal Manufacturing Works) to meet a Swiss Army requirement. Only four were manufactured; they served for three years with the Swiss military before being retired.

== History and development ==
The manufacture of a self-propelled howitzer was being considered in Switzerland in the mid-1950s. Studies were developed by the Group on Arms Services (GRD) and Eidgenoessische Konstruktionswerkstaette . Real development began in 1966 with the mounting of a 15 cm howitzer on a Panzer 61 chassis. Subsequently, four vehicles were built on Panzer 68 chassis. These possessed a range of not more than 30 km (19 mi) and had a rate of fire of 6 rounds per minute with automatic loading.

Due to technical and financial problems, the project was never pursued. The Swiss Army procured the American M109 howitzer instead. The four vehicles were used experimentally from 1972 to 1975. Two vehicles are preserved; one at the Panzermuseum Thun, the other one at the Schweizerische Militärmuseum Full.
