= Häfeli DH-4 =

General information
- Type: fighter
- Manufacturer: K+W
- Designer: August Haefeli
- Primary user: Swiss Air Force
- Number built: 1

History
- First flight: early 1918

The Häfeli DH-4 was a Swiss fighter prototype in the late 1910s, build by the Eidgenoessische Konstruktionswerkstaette. The DH-4 was a single-seat fighter based on the successful Häfeli DH-3 design. It was made of wood with fabric covering, and carried one machine gun.

== Operational history ==
The Swiss Air Force trialled it from May 1918 to August 1918, but the DH-4 was found to possess disappointing performance and poor handling. As such only one was ever produced and production ceased in late 1918.

== List of operators ==
Switzerland

- Swiss Air Force

== Specifications ==
Data from The Complete Book of Fighters

General characteristics

- Crew: 1
- Length: 6 m (19 ft 8 in)
- Wingspan: 9.8 m (32 ft 2 in)
- Height: 2.6 m (8 ft 6 in)
- Wing area: 22 m^{2} (240 sq ft)
- Empty weight: 640 kg (1,411 lb)
- Gross weight: 885 kg (1,951 lb)
- Powerplant: 1 × Hispano-Suiza HS-41 V-8 water-cooled piston engine, 112 kW (150 hp)
- Propellers: 2-bladed fixed-pitch propeller

Performance

- Maximum speed: 148 km/h (92 mph, 80 kn)
- Range: 300 km (190 mi, 160 nmi)
- Endurance: 4 hours 30 minutes
- Rate of climb: 4.5 m/s (890 ft/min)
- Time to altitude: 1,829 m (6,000 ft) in 14 minutes

Armament

- Guns: 1 x synchronised machine gun
