= Eidgenoessische Konstruktionswerkstaette =

Swiss military equipment manufacturer

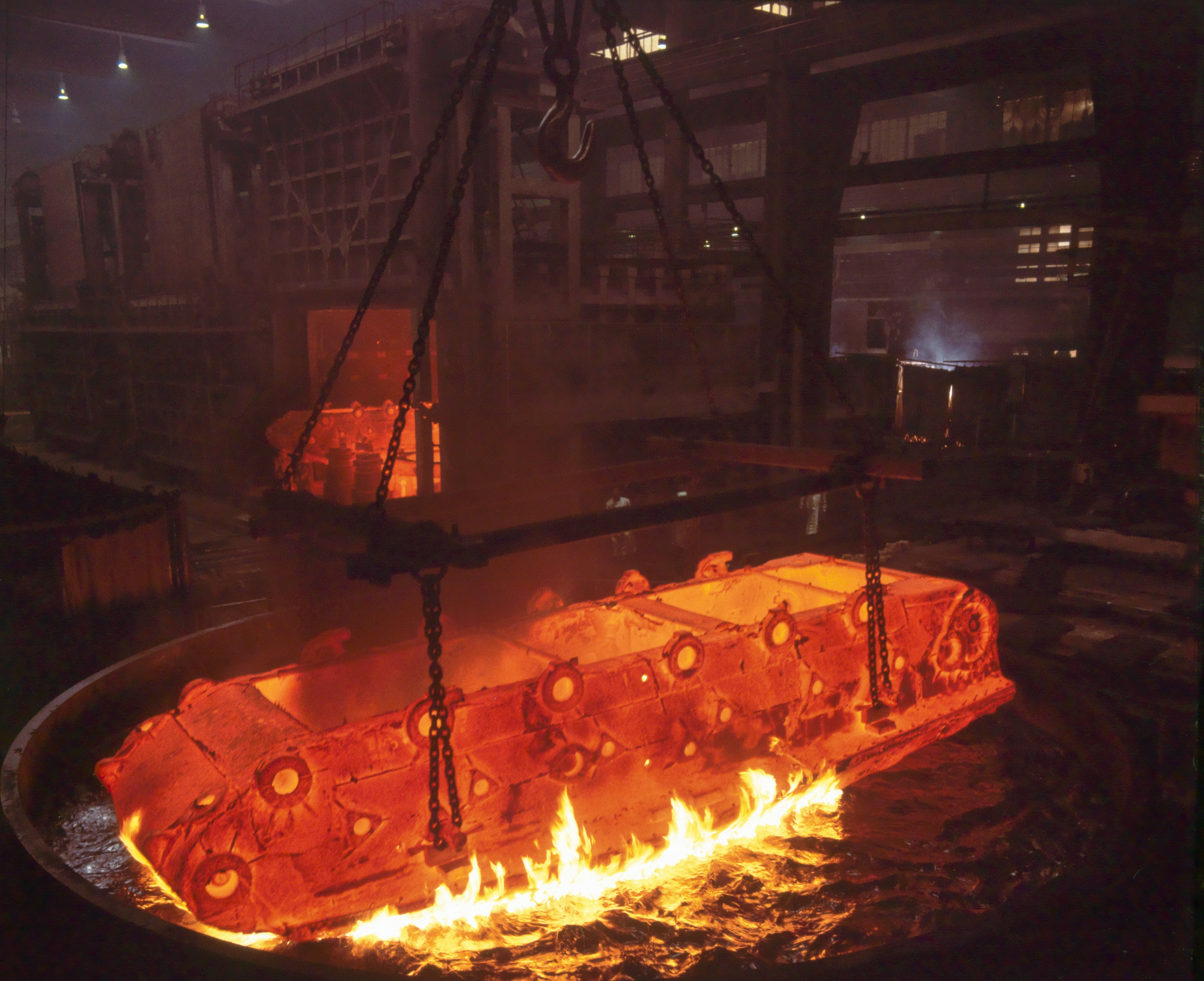
Panzer 68 hull undergoing heat treatment at Thun

Eidgenössische Konstruktionswerkstätte (English: Federal Constructions Works, abbreviated K+W), was a Swiss state-owned enterprise, with the aim of making the Swiss military independent of foreign sources for its equipment needs.

It was established in 1867 in Thun and produced artillery, vehicles and other typical military equipment. In 1914 Switzerland put in an effort to make itself independent of foreign suppliers of military aircraft and started the production of the DH-1 in Thun. Long-standing connections to the ETH Zurich ensured the necessary know-how. 1940 the aviation department moved from Thun to Emmen (LU) and in 1943 it became a separate unit of the Swiss Armed Forces independent under the name of Eidgenössisches Flugzeugwerk (F+W) (Federal Aviation Works). The Eidgenoessische Konstruktionswerkstaette focused now on the production of armoured fighting vehicles for the Swiss Army, both of its own designs and licensed production of M113 armored personnel carriers and Leopard 2 tanks and other land systems for the Swiss Army. Since 1995 it changed its name several times, started exporting and is now part of RUAG Defence.

There is a museum of the company tanks in Thun, Bern, Switzerland.

== Aircraft ==
- Häfeli DH-1
- Häfeli DH-2
- Häfeli DH-3
- Häfeli DH-4
- Häfeli DH-5
- Militär-Apparat MA-7
- EKW C-35
- EKW C-36 series
- F+W C-3605
- Morane-Saulnier D-3800

== Armored vehicles ==
- Nahkampfkanone 1
- Panzer 58
- Panzer 61
- Panzer 68
- Zielfahrzeug 68
- Entpannungspanzer 65
- Brückenpanzer 68
- Fliegerabwehrpanzer 68
- Panzerkanone 68
