= Häfeli DH-5 =

1910s Swiss reconnaissance aircraft

DH-5
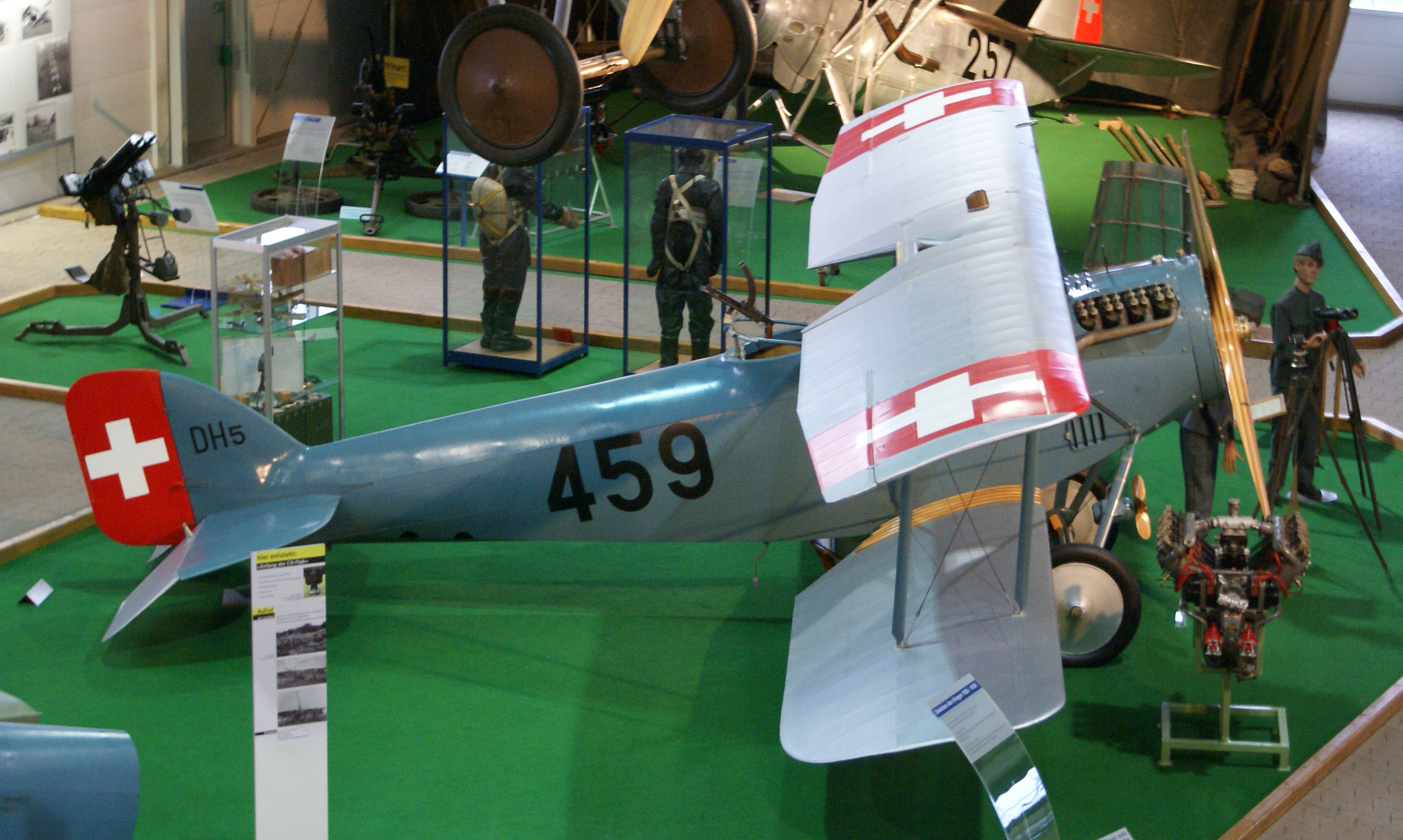
- Häfeli DH-5, second series.

General information
- Type: Reconnaissance biplane
- Manufacturer: K+W
- Designer: August Häfeli
- Primary user: Swiss Air Force
- Number built: 80

History
- Introduction date: 1922
- First flight: 1919
- Retired: 1940

The Häfeli DH-5 was a 1910s Swiss two-seat reconnaissance aircraft, built by the aircraft department of the Federal Construction Works (Eidgenoessische Konstruktionswerkstaette, K + W) at Thun, Switzerland.

== Development and design ==
The Häfeli DH-5 was a two-seat reconnaissance aircraft designed by August Haefeli. It was a single-bay biplane of wood and fabric construction. The aircraft was powered by a 180 hp (134 kW) LFW I engine produced by the Swiss Locomotive and Machine Works. Test flying of the prototype commenced in March 1919 and 39 were ordered. Some aircraft were later modified with Handley Page slats. A second batch of 20 aircraft were powered by a 200 hp (149 kW) LFW II engine. A further batch of 20 aircraft designated the DH-5A used the LFW III engine.

== Operational history ==
The DH-5 entered service in 1922 and was not withdrawn from service until 1940.

== Variants ==
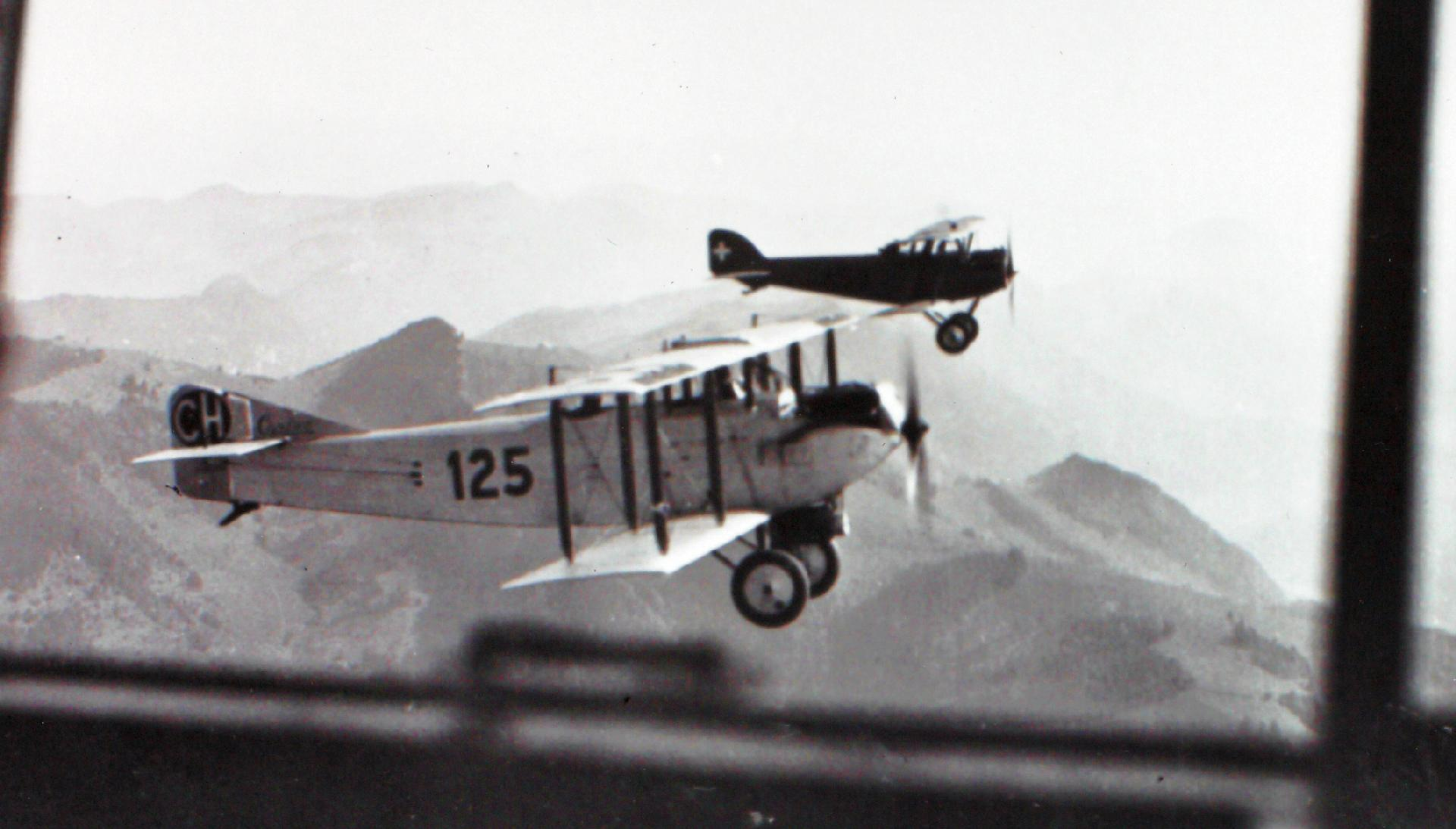
A DH-5 (background) in flight with a Caudron C.59

DH-5
Initial production version with either the LFW I or LFW II engine.
DH-5A
Version with a 220 hp (164 kw) LFW III engines, survivors were modified at Thun in 1932 with Handley Page slats and changes to allow crew to wear parachutes.
DH-5X
Trials aircraft powered by a Hispano-Suiza HS-42 (8Fb) engine imported from France. The aircraft was not ordered into production due lack of availability of the engines and the DH-5X crashed in 1933.

== Operators ==
Switzerland

- Swiss Air Force

== Specifications (DH-5A) ==
Data from The Illustrated Encyclopedia of Aircraft (Part Work 1982–1985)

General characteristics

- Crew: 2
- Length: 7.6 m (24 ft 11 in)
- Wingspan: 12 m (39 ft 4 in)
- Height: 3.1 m (10 ft 2 in)
- Wing area: 31.4 m^{2} (338 sq ft)
- Empty weight: 859 kg (1,894 lb)
- Gross weight: 1,271 kg (2,802 lb)
- Powerplant: 1 × LFW III V8 water-cooled piston engine, 160 kW (220 hp)
- Propellers: 2-bladed fixed-pitch propeller

Performance

- Maximum speed: 180 km/h (110 mph, 97 kn)
- Range: 480 km (300 mi, 260 nmi)
- Service ceiling: 5,600 m (18,400 ft)

Armament

- one fixed forward-facing machine-gun
- one pivoted machine-gun in the rear cockpit
