= Militär-Apparat MA-7 =

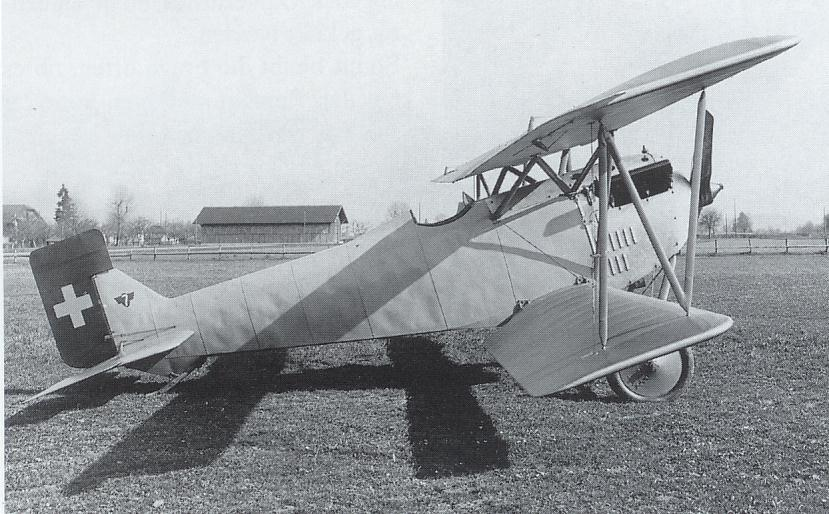

General information
- Type: Fighter aircraft
- Manufacturer: K & W
- Designer: August Haefeli
- Primary user: Swiss Air Force
- Number built: 1

History
- Introduction date: February 1926
- First flight: 1925
- Retired: April 1926

The Militär-Apparat MA-7, also known as the Häfeli MA-7 and K & W MA-7, was a prototype fighter designed by August Häfeli in Switzerland. It flew in two different engine configurations, neither of which were deemed satisfactory and so the type did not enter series production. However, it did achieve a Swiss record for flying at an altitude of 9,800 metres (32,200 feet) above sea level in 1926.

== Design and development ==
Designed by August Häfeli in response to a Swiss Air Force requirement for an indigenous fighter design, the MA-7 was a biplane of fabric-covered wood construction with N-shaped wing struts like its predecessor the Fokker D.VI of 1918. Ailerons were installed only on the upper wing, which also contained an auxiliary gravity fuel tank. Power was provided by a 300 hp (220 kW) Hispano-Suiza 8Fb HS42 V-8 liquid-cooled engine manufactured in Switzerland under license. The aircraft was built by K & W in 1925 and handed over for trials in February 1926.

The prototype was returned to the manufacturer in April 1926 due to unsatisfactory flight characteristics and performance. K & W responded with the installation of an indigenous 400 hp (300 kW) LFW-12 X-1 engine. This, however, proved too large and heavy for the frame and entire MA-7 project was subsequently discontinued. The Swiss Air Force procured the French Dewoitine D.1 as their replacement fighter instead.

== Records ==
On 23 April 1926, test pilot Max Cartier set a Swiss record of 9,800 metres (32,200 feet) above sea level with the MA-7.

== Operators ==
Switzerland

- Swiss Air Force

== Specifications ==
Data from Urech & Hunziker, 1974 Fader, 2013

General characteristics

- Crew: One
- Length: 6.61 m (21 ft 8 in)
- Wingspan: 9.91 m (32 ft 6 in)
- Height: 2.79 m (9 ft 2 in)
- Wing area: 23.75 m^{2} (255.6 sq ft)
- Empty weight: 843 kg (1,858 lb)
- Gross weight: 1,213 kg (2,674 lb)
- Powerplant: 1 × Hispano-Suiza 8Fb HS-42 V8, liquid-cooled aircraft engine, 220 kW (300 hp)

Performance

- Maximum speed: 235 km/h (146 mph, 127 kn)
- Cruise speed: 255 km/h (158 mph, 138 kn) (econ cruise)
- Range: 300 km (190 mi, 160 nmi)
- Service ceiling: 7,600 m (24,900 ft)
- Rate of climb: 9.2 m/s (1,810 ft/min)

== See also ==
Aircraft of comparable role, configuration, and era

- Fairey Firefly I
- Fokker D.IX
