= Häfeli DH-3 =

DH-3

General information
- Type: Reconnaissance biplane
- Manufacturer: K+W
- Designer: August Häfeli
- Primary user: Swiss Air Force
- Number built: DH-3 24; DH-3a 83; DH-3b 3

History
- Introduction date: 1917
- Retired: 1939
- Developed from: Hafeli DH-2

The Häfeli DH-3 was a 1910 Swiss two-seat reconnaissance aircraft, built by the aircraft department of the Federal Construction Works (Eidgenoessische Konstruktionswerkstaette, (K+W)) at Thun, Switzerland.

== Development and design ==
Following the poor performance of the DH-2, August Haefeli designed an improved version the Häfeli DH-3. It was basically the same airframe as the DH-2, the upper wing had a cutout to give a greater field of fire for the pivoting machine gun. It was a two-bay aircraft of wood and fabric construction, powered by a 120 hp (89 kW) Argus As II water-cooled inline engine. Initial problems with the landing gear and the engine cooling system led to modifications. Further developments were the re-engined and improved DH-3a, and the DH-3b used for engine trials. Following successful trials with an installation of the Handley Page slats all surviving DH-3as were modified in 1932.

== Operational history ==
On 8 January 1919 a DH-3 inaugurated the first Swiss air mail service between Zurich and Berne. A DH-3 aircraft failed a structural test in 1923 which caused the DH-3 to be withdrawn from service. The DH-3a, following modification, remained in service until 1939.

== Variants ==
DH-3
Initial production version with Argus As II engine, 24 built.
DH-3a
Improved version with Hispano-Suiza HS-41 8Aa engines, four aircraft ordered in 1919. A second order for 30 aircraft was placed in 1919 with license-built engines, a third order for 49 aircraft being placed in 1925. Survivors were modified at Thun in 1932 with Handley Page slats and changes to allow crew to wear parachutes.
DH-3b
Three aircraft powered by the indigenous 150 hp (112 kW) LFW 0 engine developed by the Swiss Locomotive and Machine Works were built in 1918.

== Operators ==
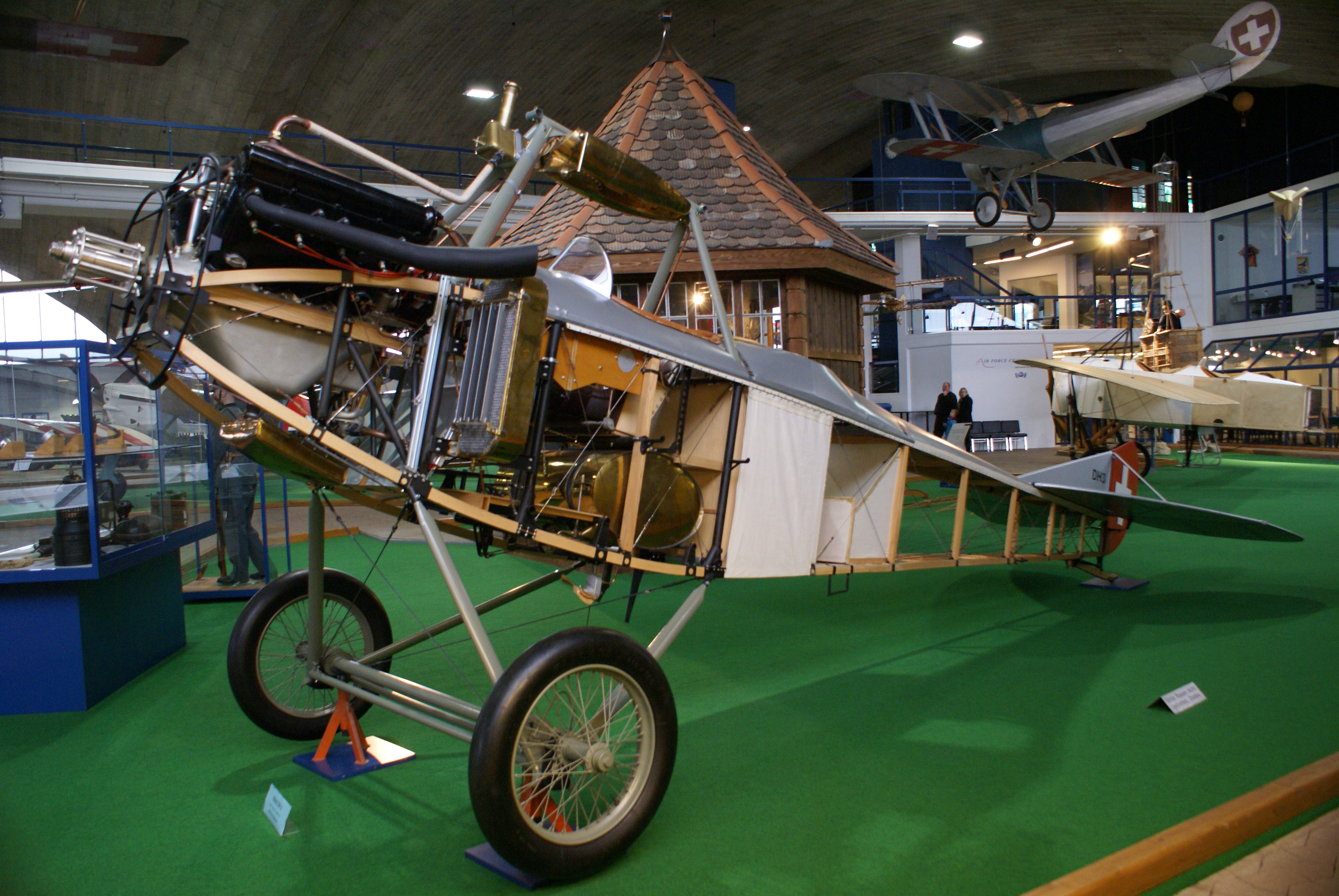
Cutaway replica of a Häfeli DH-3

Switzerland

- Swiss Air Force

== Specifications (DH-3a) ==
Data from The Illustrated Encyclopedia of Aircraft (Part Work 1982–1985)

General characteristics

- Crew: 2
- Length: 7.95 m (26 ft 1 in)
- Wingspan: 12.5 m (41 ft 0 in)
- Height: 3.1 m (10 ft 2 in)
- Wing area: 38 m^{2} (410 sq ft)
- Empty weight: 1,587 kg (3,499 lb)
- Gross weight: 1,110 kg (2,447 lb)
- Powerplant: 1 × Hispano-Suiza 8Aa (HS-41) V-8 water-cooled piston engine, 110 kW (150 hp)
- Propellers: 2-bladed fixed-pitch propeller

Performance

- Maximum speed: 145 km/h (90 mph, 78 kn)
- Range: 400 km (250 mi, 220 nmi)
- Service ceiling: 4,500 m (14,800 ft)

Armament

- Guns: 1x flexible machine gun in the rear cockpit
