= Mirage affair =

Mirage(s) affair may refer to:

- Taiwan Mirage affair, a 1992 scandal involving the sales of Mirage 2000-5 fighter jets to the Republic of China Air Force in Taiwan
- Mirages affair, a 1964 Swiss scandal involving cost overruns in the purchase of Mirage III fighter jets
