= France–Taiwan relations =

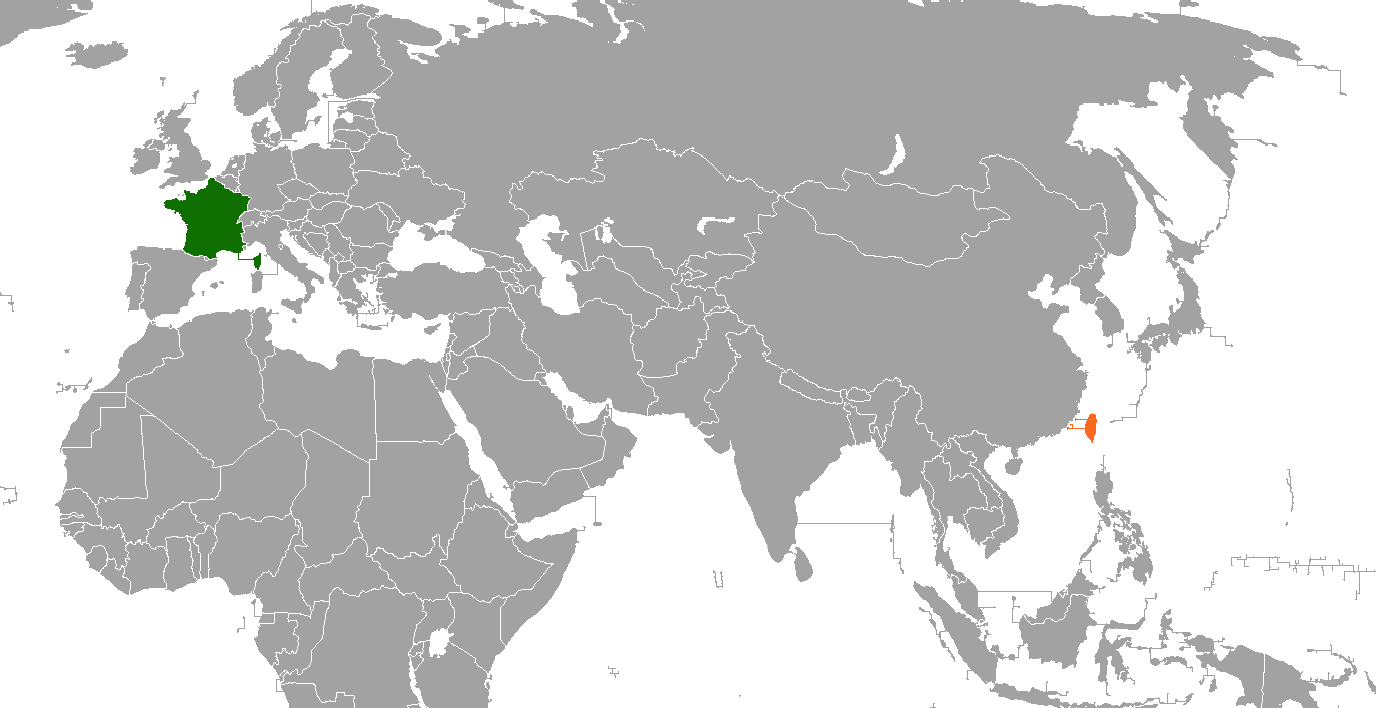
- France: Taiwan

Diplomatic mission
- French Office, Taipei: Taipei Representative Office, Paris

Envoy
- Director Franck Paris: Representative Hao Pei-chih

French and Chinese forces engaged in battles around Taiwan in the late 19th century. In the early 20th century, the French Third Republic established diplomatic relations with the Republic of China (ROC). In 1964, France became the first major Western power to establish ambassadorial level diplomatic relations with the People's Republic of China (PRC) instead but continued to sell major weapon platforms to the ROC following its retreat to Taiwan. This was stepped back in 1994 when France upgraded its relations with the PRC and recognized Taiwan as Chinese territory. Relations have improved significantly since then. Military relations have been impacted by scandals like the Taiwan frigate scandal and Taiwan Mirage affair.

== History ==
=== Qing dynasty ===
During the Sino-French War in 1884, French warships entered Taiwan seas and disrupted coastal provinces.

Meanwhile, the French decided to put pressure on China by landing an expeditionary corps in northern Taiwan to seize Keelung and Tamsui, redeeming the failure of 6 August and finally winning the 'pledge' they sought. On 1 October Lieutenant-Colonel Bertaux-Levillain landed at Keelung with a force of 1,800 marine infantry, forcing the Chinese to withdraw to strong defensive positions which had been prepared in the surrounding hills. The French force was too small to advance beyond Keelung, and the Pei-tao coal mines remained in Chinese hands. Meanwhile, after an ineffective naval bombardment on 2 October, Admiral Lespès attacked the Chinese defences at Tamsui with 600 sailors from his squadron's landing companies on 8 October, and was decisively repulsed by forces under the command of the Fujianese general Sun Kaihua (孫開華). As a result of this reverse, French control over Formosa was limited merely to the town of Keelung. This achievement fell far short of what had been hoped for.

=== Japanese colonial rule ===
During Japanese colonial rule, the Vichy regime opened a consulate in Taihoku in February 1942.

=== Republic of China ===
==== Early years ====
The French Third Republic recognized the establishment of the Republic of China (ROC) and established diplomatic relations with the Beiyang government on 7 October 1913. The Institut Franco Chinoise de Lyon (1921–1951) promoted cultural exchanges.

During World War II, Free France and the Nationalist government, who had overthrown the Beiyang and the warlords, fought as allied powers against the Axis powers of Germany, Italy and Japan. After the invasion of France in 1940, although the newly formed Vichy France was an ally of Germany, it continued to recognize the Kuomintang government of Chiang Kai-shek—which had to flee to Chongqing in the Chinese interior after the fall of Nanjing in 1937—rather than the Japanese-sponsored Reorganized National Government of China under Wang Jingwei. French diplomats in China remained accredited to the government in Chongqing.

==== Cold War ====
After the Chinese Civil War and the establishment of the new communist-led People's Republic of China (PRC) on 1 October 1949, the French Fourth Republic government refused to recognize the PRC after the ROC government retreated to Taiwan. However, by 1964 France and the PRC officially established ambassadorial level diplomatic relations ending relations with the ROC. This was precipitated by Charles de Gaulle's official recognition of the PRC. France continued to sell weapons to the ROC but put an end to this practice in 1994 when it normalised its ties with the PRC. Per its one China policy, France now recognizes the People's Republic of China as the sole government of China and Taiwan as an integral part of Chinese territory.

=== Recent history ===
Since 1994, relations between France and Taiwan have stabilized, evident in the upgrading of cross representative offices, increasingly regular political dialogue, and continued military relationship.

In 2016, a delegation of French legislators led by Francois de Rugy visited Taiwan.

In 2018, China made accusations against France after a French naval vessel transited the Taiwan Strait.

In December 2020, Taiwan opened its second representative office in France, in Aix-en-Provence.

In October 2021, a delegation of French senators visited Taiwan. In November 2021, the French parliament passed a resolution which called on the French government to support Taiwan's participation in international organizations. The Taiwanese government praised the resolution. In December 2021, a delegation of lawmakers from the French National Assembly visited Taiwan.

In April 2023, French president Emmanuel Macron said "The question Europeans need to answer… is it in our interest to accelerate [a crisis] on Taiwan? No. The worse thing would be to think that we Europeans must become followers on this topic and take our cue from the U.S. agenda and a Chinese overreaction," along with "Europeans cannot resolve the crisis in Ukraine; how can we credibly say on Taiwan, 'watch out, if you do something wrong we will be there' ? If you really want to increase tensions that's the way to do it." during his three-day state visit to China.

In May 2023, Taiwanese solid state battery manufacturer ProLogium announced that it would open a 5.2 billion euro primary international production center in Dunkirk at a ceremony headlined by President Macron. The investment was partially intended as a hedge against political risk.

The Russian invasion of Ukraine and China's alliance with Russia brought France and Taiwan closer together. At the 2025 Shangri-La Dialogue in Singapore French President Emmanuel Macron stated that Taiwan's future security was a major reason to back Ukraine in its war against Russia. China protested Macron's comparison of Taiwan and Ukraine.

In 2025 the annual French Festival was held in Kaohsiung for the first time.

== Military relations ==
Defense relations between France and Taiwan have been significant with Taiwan acquiring a number of major weapons platforms from France.

=== Taiwan frigate scandal ===
The Taiwan frigate deal was a huge political scandal, both in Taiwan and France. Eight people involved in the contract died in unusual and possibly suspicious circumstances. Arms dealer Andrew Wang fled Taiwan to the UK after the body of presumptive whistleblower Captain Yin Ching-feng was found floating in the sea. In 2001, Swiss authorities froze accounts held by Andrew Wang and his family in connection to the Taiwan frigate scandal.

=== Taiwan Mirage affair ===
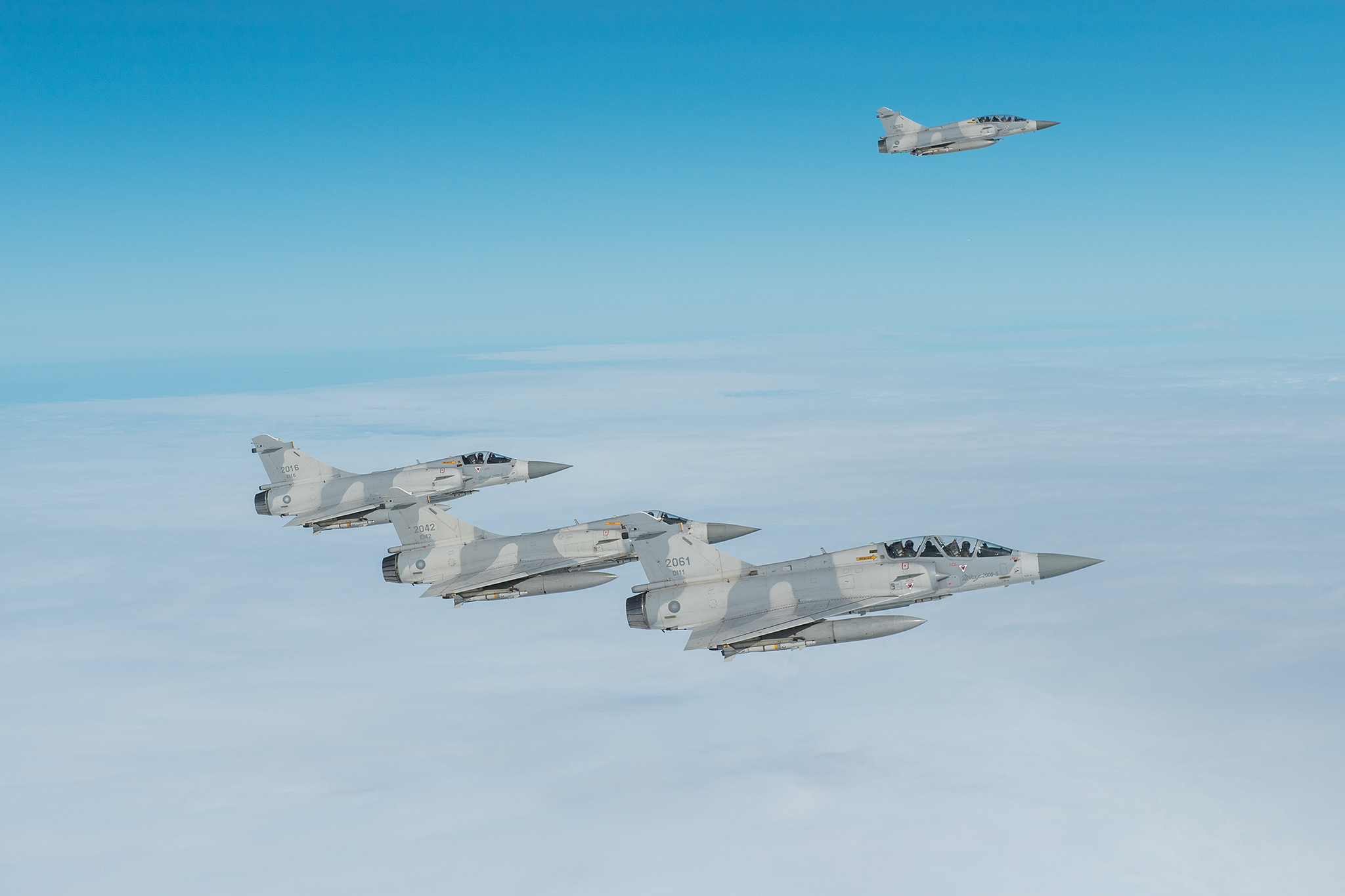
Mirage 2000EI fighter jets of the Republic of China Air Force in October 2017.

The Taiwan Mirage affair involved an arms deal signed in 1992, in which Dassault Aviation, missile manufacturer Matra (later MBDA), Thomson-CSF (later Thales) and Snecma (later Safran Aircraft Engines) would supply 60 Mirage 2000 fighter jets armed with MICA missiles to the Republic of China Air Force in Taiwan. Taiwan eventually received compensation.

== See also ==
- China–France relations
- Clearstream affair
- Taipei Representative Office, Paris
- French Office, Taipei
- Taiwan–European Union relations
