= Jakob Annasohn =

Swiss army officer (1901–1983)

- Born: 22 October 1901; Romanshorn, Switzerland
- Died: 10 March 1983 (aged 81); Bern, Switzerland
- Spouse: Mary Strickler (m. 1942)
- Military career
- Allegiance: Switzerland
- Branch: Swiss Army
- Rank: Corps commander
- Commands: 7th Division (from 1952); Chief of the General Staff (1958–1964)

Jakob Annasohn (22 October 1901 – 10 March 1983) was a Swiss army officer who was chief of the general staff from 1958 to 1964. He advocated an offensive defense supported by nuclear weapons, but had to scale back his projects; the compromise reached with the troop organization of 1961 created an army able to combine static defense with counterattacks. As head of the working group for military aircraft procurement, he took responsibility for the Mirages affair and resigned at the end of 1964.

== Biography ==
Jakob Annasohn was born on 22 October 1901 in Romanshorn, the son of Jakob Annasohn, a bookkeeper at the gasworks who later became mayor (Gemeindepräsident) of Romanshorn and a district judge in Arbon. In 1942 he married Mary Strickler, daughter of Robert Strickler.

After the Matura in 1920, Annasohn studied for two semesters at the Faculty of Letters (Faculté des lettres) in Geneva and for four semesters Swiss history in Zurich, as well as literature, psychology and law.

In 1929 Annasohn became an instruction officer. In 1940 he became commander of a fusilier battalion, in 1944 chief of staff of the 7th Division and in 1945 a regimental commander. From 1945 to 1949 he headed the operations section of the general staff division (Generalstabsabteilung). Promoted to divisional commander (Oberstdivisionär) in 1950, he first became sub-chief of staff for the front (Unterstabschef Front) and commander of the general staff courses, and at the end of 1952 commander of the 7th Division. In 1958 he was appointed chief of the general staff, and with it corps commander (Oberstkorpskommandant).

As a senior official (Chefbeamter) of the general staff division, Annasohn took part in the struggle over a unified concept of national defense. After his election as chief of the general staff he advocated an offensive defense supported by nuclear weapons. He had to scale back his projects because of financial constraints and strong opposition. The compromise reached with the troop organization of 1961 (Truppenordnung 1961) created an army capable of combining static defense with counterattacks.

As head of the working group for military aircraft procurement, Annasohn took responsibility for the Mirages affair and offered his resignation. The Federal Council made this public on 7 October 1964 and asked him to stay in office for the time being. After Paul Gygli was appointed as his successor on 10 November, Annasohn left the post at the end of 1964. In 1965–1966 he served as the Federal Council's delegate for special studies. His report of December 1966, Wirksame Unterstützung des Bundesrates in der Leitung der totalen Landesverteidigung ("Effective support of the Federal Council in the direction of total national defense"), laid the foundation for the federal act on the command organization and the Council for Total Defense (Bundesgesetz über die Leitungsorganisation und den Rat für Gesamtverteidigung).

Annasohn was an inspiring teacher and a convincing leader who combined general-staff precision with breadth in operational planning. He died in Bern on 10 March 1983.

== Bibliography ==
- Der Schweizerische Generalstab, 8, 22

=== Archives ===
- Swiss Federal Archives, Bern
