= Arthur Moll =

Swiss military officer (1921–2024)

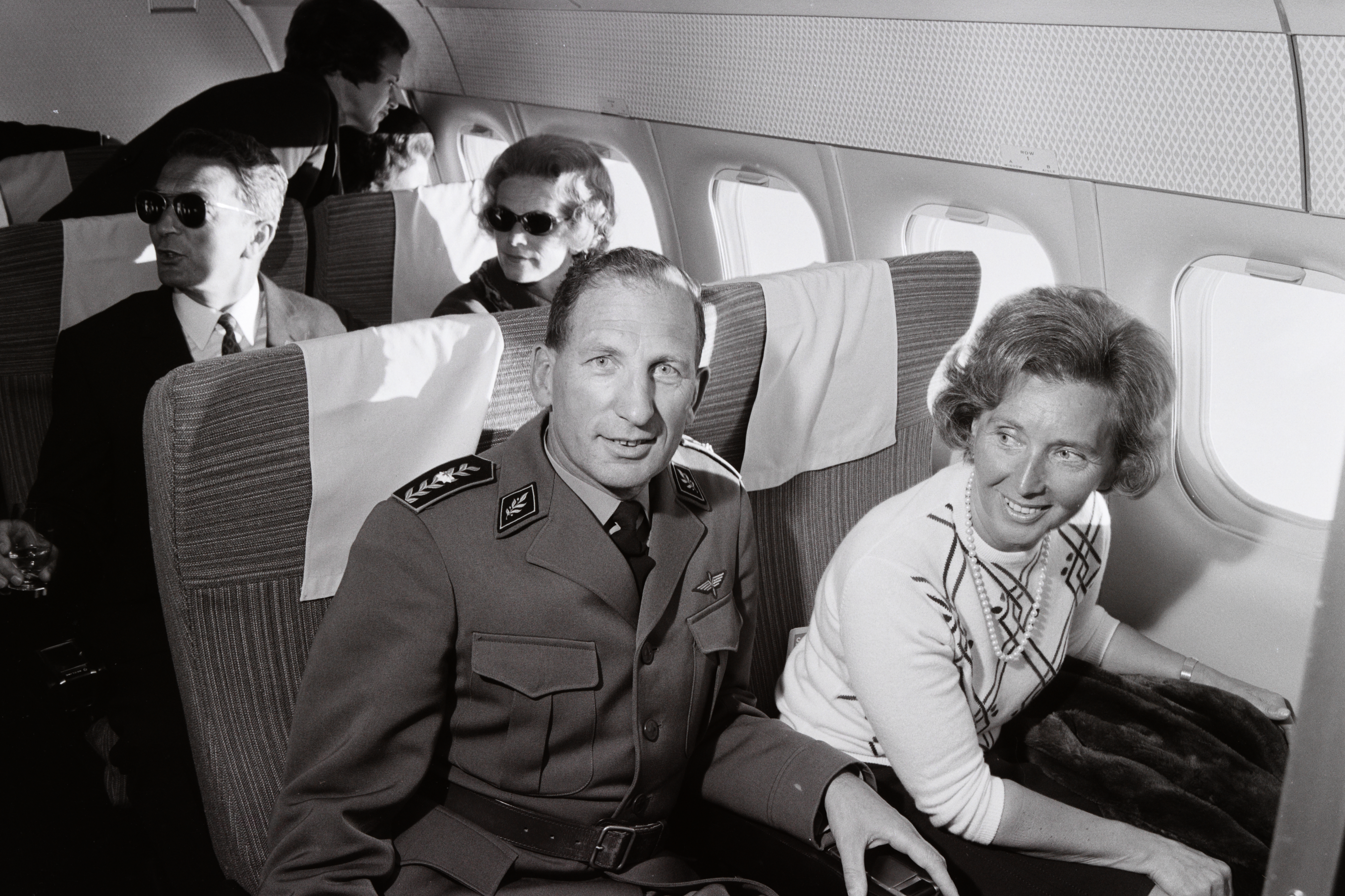
- Moll with his wife in a Swissair DC-9
- Born: 18 September 1921; Bern, Switzerland
- Died: 1 December 2024 (aged 103) Erlenbach, Switzerland
- Allegiance: Switzerland
- Branch: Swiss Air Force
- Service years: 1941–1983
- Rank: Lieutenant general
- Commands: Swiss Air Force and Anti-Aircraft Troops
- Spouse: Gertrud Oetiker

Arthur Moll (18 September 1921 – 1 December 2024) was a Swiss military officer. He served as the commander of the Swiss Air Force and Anti-Aircraft Troops from 1981 to 1983 and held the rank of Lieutenant general (Korpskommandant).

== Early life and education ==
Moll was born on 18 September 1921 in Bern. He was the son of Arthur Moll, a locomotive driver for the Swiss Federal Railways (SBB). He was a citizen of Dulliken and was non-denominational.

He obtained a commercial diploma in 1941.

== Military career ==
Moll initially served in the infantry before obtaining his military pilot's license in 1946, transferring to the Air Force. He served as a pilot in the Surveillance Squadron (Überwachungsgeschwader) from 1945 to 1947 and again from 1949 to 1951. From 1951 to 1983, he worked as an instructor officer.

He became a general staff officer in 1956. From 1964 to 1967, Moll was responsible for the introduction of the Mirage aircraft into the Swiss Air Force. He served as a brigadier from 1968 to 1974. In 1975, he was promoted to major general (Divisionär) and became the chief of the Air Force and Anti-Aircraft Troops, as well as the director of the federal office responsible for that branch.

From 1981 to 1983, he held the rank of lieutenant general (Korpskommandant) and served as the commander of the Aviation and Anti-Aircraft Troops.

== Later life ==
Following his retirement, Moll worked as an advisor in the air defense industry from 1984 to 1989. He presided over the interest group for Bernese air traffic, focusing on Belp Airport, from 1985 to 1995. He was also a member of the "Living History Working Group" from 1998 to 2008 and supported the creation of the Swiss Army Museum in Thun.

== Personal life ==
Moll was married to Gertrud Oetiker, the daughter of Gustav Oetiker, a municipal employee of the city of Zurich.

He died on 1 December 2024 in Erlenbach at the age of 103.
