= Etienne Primault =

Swiss air force officer (1904–1984)

- Born: 5 May 1904; Cormoret, Switzerland
- Died: 30 November 1984 (aged 80); Zurich, Switzerland
- Spouse: Veronika Bano
- Military career
- Allegiance: Switzerland
- Branch: Air force and anti-aircraft troops
- Rank: Divisional commander
- Commands: Head of the air force and anti-aircraft troops (1953–1964)

Etienne Primault (5 May 1904 – 30 November 1984) was a Swiss military officer and pilot. From 1953 to 1964 he was head (Waffenchef) of the air force and anti-aircraft troops, and in 1953 he became a divisional commander. He played a major part in the evaluation and procurement of the Mirage fighter aircraft. After the massive cost overruns of the Mirages affair he was relieved of his post, but the Federal Supreme Court later cleared him of personal guilt.

== Biography ==
Etienne Primault was born on 5 May 1904 in Cormoret, the son of Henri Primault, a watchmaker and hotelier, and Marie Elise Schreyer. He married Veronika Bano, daughter of Eugen Bano. He studied political science (Staatswissenschaften) at the University of Neuchâtel. He was secretary of the Federal Air Office (Eidgenössisches Luftamt) and of the Aero-Club der Schweiz.

Primault then made a military career in the air force and anti-aircraft troops (Flieger- und Flugabwehrtruppen). From 1930 to 1944 he was an instruction officer and pilot, from 1945 to 1952 head of a section (Sektionschef), and from 1953 to 1964 head of the arm (Waffenchef). He was promoted to colonel in 1946 and to divisional commander (Divisionär) in 1953.

Primault played a major part in the evaluation and procurement of the Mirage fighter aircraft. After the massive cost overruns of the Mirages affair he was relieved of his post (zur Disposition gestellt), but the Federal Supreme Court later cleared him of personal guilt. He died in Zurich on 30 November 1984.

== Bibliography ==
- E. Wetter and E. von Orelli, Wer ist wer im Militär?, 1986, 280
- Der Schweizerische Generalstab, 8, 280–281; 10, 635–636
