= General Staff (Switzerland) =

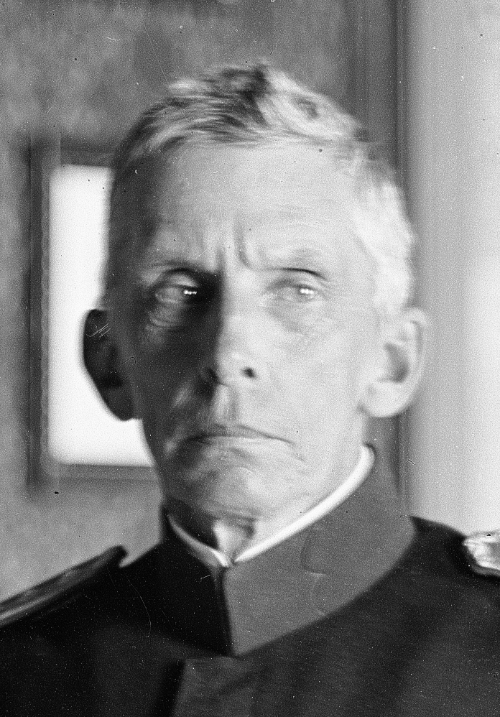
Theophil Sprecher von Bernegg (seen here) was the second longest serving Chief of the General Staff.

The General Staff of the Swiss Armed Forces (German: Generalstab Schweizer Armee) was the managing military staff of Switzerland. It was led by a Chief of the General Staff who held the rank of Korpskommandant (NATO: OF-8). He/she was effectively the highest-ranking officer in the Swiss military. Until 1830, the general staff consisted of 12 to 24 federal colonels and a few lieutenant colonels with experience in serving foreign armies. In 1865, the Federal Staff Office was created, with its responsibility being to maintain the Swiss combat readiness for war. In 1948, most of the services of the Federal Military Department were grouped together in the General Staff. After the Second World War, General Staff training was increasingly a precondition for the assumption of an army unit command. It operated until the end of 2003, when the reforms of Armee XXI introduced the position of Chief of the Armed Forces. Until its reorganization, the General Staff was the highest level of command in the Swiss Armed forces, with the Chief of the General Staff acting as the primus inter pares (first among equals). Even after the reform of the army, the military continued to utilize, General Staff officers, who are trained in the General Staff School to become senior management assistants in the armed forces.

== List of Chiefs of the General Staff ==
The following is a list of chiefs of the General Staff from 1870 to 2003:

No.	Picture	Chief of the General Staff	Took office	Left office	Time in office	Election	General	Ref.
1	Rudolf Paravicini [de]	Oberstkorpskommandant; Rudolf Paravicini (1815–1888)	21 July 1870	1875	4–5 years	20 July 1870	Hans Herzog (1870 – 1871)	
2	Hermann Siegfried [de]	Oberstkorpskommandant; Hermann Siegfried (1819–1879)	1875	1879	3–4 years	?	—	—
3	Johann Rudolf von Sinner [de]	Oberstkorpskommandant; Johann Rudolf von Sinner (1830–1901)	1879	1882	2–3 years	?	—	—
4	Max Alphons Pfyffer von Altishofen	Oberstkorpskommandant; Max Alphons Pfyffer von Altishofen (1834–1890)	1883	1890 †	6–7 years	?	—	—
5	Arnold Keller [de]	Oberstkorpskommandant; Arnold Keller (1841–1934)	1890	1905	14–15 years	?	—	—
6	Theophil Sprecher von Bernegg	Oberstkorpskommandant; Theophil Sprecher von Bernegg (1850–1927)	1905	1919	13–14 years	?	Ulrich Wille (1914 – 1918)	—
7	Emil Sonderegger	Oberstkorpskommandant; Emil Sonderegger (1868–1934)	1920	1923	2–3 years	?	—	—
8	Heinrich Roost [de]	Oberstkorpskommandant; Heinrich Roost (1872–1936)	1923	26 May 1936 †	12–13 years	?	—	—
9	Jakob Labhardt [de]	Oberstkorpskommandant; Jakob Labhardt (1881–1949)	1936	1940	3–4 years	?	Henri Guisan (1939 – 1945)	—
10	Jakob Huber [de]	Oberstkorpskommandant; Jakob Huber (1883–1953)	23 March 1940	1945	4–5 years	?	Henri Guisan (1939 – 1945)	—
11	Louis de Montmollin	Oberstkorpskommandant; Louis de Montmollin (1893–1974)	1945	1957	11–12 years	?	—	—
12	Jakob Annasohn	Oberstkorpskommandant; Jakob Annasohn (1901–1983)	1 January 1958	31 December 1964	6 years	?	—	
13	Paul Gygli	Oberstkorpskommandant; Paul Gygli (1909–1992)	1 January 1965	31 December 1971	6 years	?	—	—
14	Johann Jakob Vischer [de]	Korpskommandant; Johann Jakob Vischer (1914–1985)	1 January 1972	31 December 1976	4 years	?	—	—
15	Hans Senn	Korpskommandant; Hans Senn (1918–2007)	1 January 1977	31 December 1980	3 years	?	—	—
16	Jörg Zumstein [de]	Korpskommandant; Jörg Zumstein (1923–1997)	1 January 1981	31 December 1985	4 years	?	—	—
17	Eugen Lüthy [de]	Korpskommandant; Eugen Lüthy (1927–1990)	1 January 1986	31 December 1989	3 years	?	—	—
18	Heinz Häsler [de]	Korpskommandant; Heinz Häsler (born 1930)	1 January 1990	31 December 1992	2 years	?	—	—
19	Arthur Liener [de]	Korpskommandant; Arthur Liener (born 1936)	1 January 1993	31 December 1997	4 years	?	—	—
20	Hans-Ulrich Scherrer [de]	Korpskommandant; Hans-Ulrich Scherrer (born 1942)	1 January 1998	31 December 2002	4 years	?	—	—
21	Christophe Keckeis	Korpskommandant; Christophe Keckeis (1945–2020)	1 January 2003	31 December 2003	1 year	?	—	—
