= Jon Andri Tgetgel =

Swiss military officer (1926–2024)

- Born: 4 June 1926; Samedan, Switzerland
- Died: 16 July 2024 (aged 98)
- Allegiance: Switzerland
- Branch: Swiss Armed Forces
- Service years: 1959–1988
- Rank: Brigadier
- Commands: Territorial Zone 12 (1980–1982); Mountain Division 12 (1983–1988)
- Spouses: Claire Louise Schelling; Eliane Rita Zanetti

Jon Andri Tgetgel (4 June 1926 – 16 July 2024) was a Swiss military officer and civil engineer, and held the rank of Brigadier.

== Early life and education ==
Tgetgel was born on 4 June 1926 in Samedan. He was the son of Heinrich Tgetgel, a teacher at the secondary and commercial school for girls in Chur, and Angelina (née Claglüna). He was a Protestant citizen of Ardez and Trun.

After attending the cantonal school in Chur, Tgetgel studied at the ETH Zurich from 1945 to 1950, obtaining a diploma in civil engineering.

== Civilian career ==
Tgetgel began working as an engineer in 1951. He was employed by the Zurich Department of Public Works from 1961 to 1963. He subsequently joined Suiselectra in Basel, where he worked as a staff member and later as deputy director from 1963 to 1979.

== Military career ==
Tgetgel served as a general staff officer from 1959 to 1979. He was the chief of staff for Frontier Brigade 12 (Grenzbrigade 12) from 1970 to 1971. In 1980, he was promoted to brigadier and assumed command of Territorial Zone 12, a position he held until 1982. From 1983 to 1988, he commanded Mountain Division 12.

== Personal life ==
Tgetgel was married twice. His first marriage was to Claire Louise Schelling, the daughter of Gustave Adolf Schelling, director general of Helvetia Incendie. His second marriage was to Eliane Rita Zanetti, the daughter of Antonio Zanetti, a mechanic.

He died on 16 July 2024.
