= Pierre-Marie Halter =

Swiss army officer (1925–2025)

- Born: 28 April 1925; Viège
- Died: 8 August 2025 (aged 100)
- Occupation: Army officer
- Spouse: Marguerite Adeline Leibzig

Pierre-Marie Halter (28 April 1925 – 8 August 2025) was a Swiss army officer who reached the rank of divisional commander and commanded Border Division 5 (later Field Division 5) from 1978 to 1985.

== Life and career ==
Halter was the son of Karl Franz Xaver Halter, a bank director. He married Marguerite Adeline Leibzig, daughter of the manufacturer Paul Celestin Leibzig. He studied law at Fribourg and Bern, obtaining his licence in 1954.

He became an instructor officer in 1954 and a general staff officer in 1959, and was promoted chief of staff of Mountain Division 9 in 1974. Appointed Divisionär in 1975, he commanded Border Division 5 (renamed Field Division 5 in 1981) from 1978 to 1985.

He served on various commissions of the Swiss Christian Democratic People's Party, notably its commission on foreign policy and security (1968–1988).

== Bibliography ==
- L'Etat-major, 9, 374.
