= Hans Senn =

Hans Senn (1918–2007) was a general officer of the Swiss Army.

Senn was born in Zofingen and, as a young officer, studied at the Ecole Supérieure de Guerre in Paris. As Army head of operations he unsuccessfully advocated a policy of nuclear armament as a deterrent against the Warsaw Pact in the 1960s. Switzerland eventually ratified the Nuclear Non-Proliferation Treaty.

As Chief of the General Staff, holding the rank of Korpskommandant (NATO: OF-8), Senn was Switzerland's most senior military officer from 1977 to 1980. After his retirement, he authored two standard works about Swiss defence efforts during World War II.
