= Taiwan frigate scandal =

Bribery scandal in Taiwan and France

The Taiwan frigate scandal, or the Lafayette scandal, was a political scandal in Taiwan and France regarding the sale of La Fayette-class frigates by Thomson-CSF to Taiwan. The scandal damaged relations between Taiwan and European defense firms.

== History ==
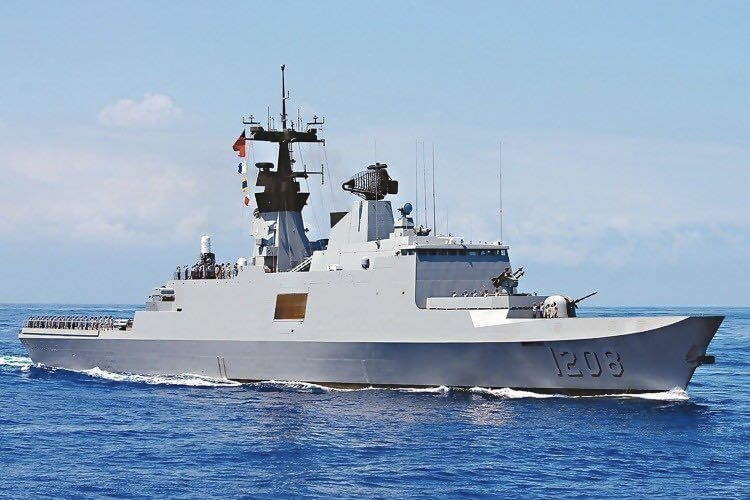
ROCS Chen De (PFG-1208)

In 1998, former French foreign minister Roland Dumas alleged that a US$500 million commission was paid by Thomson-CSF (now Thales) to French and Taiwanese officials, to facilitate the $3 billion sale of 6 La Fayette-class frigates to the Taiwanese Navy. Eight people involved in the contract died in unusual and possibly suspicious circumstances. Taiwanese arms dealer Andrew Wang, who was implicated as being part of the affair, fled Taiwan to the UK, after the body of presumptive whistleblower Captain Yin Ching-feng was found in the ocean.

In 2001, Swiss authorities froze accounts held by Andrew Wang and his family in connection with the Taiwan frigate scandal.

Politician James Soong has been implicated in the Taiwan frigate scandal, in 2022 a relevant bank account was revealed as part of the Suisse secrets leaks.

Six ROC naval officers were indicted on corruption charges relating to the affair.

In 2006, Andrew Wang, his wife, and their four children were indicted by Taiwanese prosecutors on charges of bribery, money laundering and related illegal actions. Bruno Wang, Andrew's eldest son, denies the allegations against him. In 2010, a court in Jersey seized $6.87 million from accounts controlled by the Wang family at the request of Taiwanese authorities. Accounts in Switzerland, the Cayman Islands, Luxembourg, and Saudi Arabia were also identified by investigators. The Jersey court authorized the seizure under “Proceeds of Crime (Jersey) Law 1999” and “Proceeds of Crime (Enforcement of Confiscation Orders) (Jersey) Regulations 2008.”

In 2003, the Taiwanese Navy sued Thomson-CSF (Thales) to recover an alleged $590 million in kickbacks, paid to French and Taiwanese officials as bribes to facilitate the 1991 La Fayette deal, as Taiwan had initially been reluctant to purchase the frigates.

The kickback money was deposited in Swiss banks, and under the corruption investigation, Swiss authorities froze approximately $730 million in over 60 accounts. In June 2007 the Swiss authority returned $34 million from frozen accounts to Taiwan, with additional funds pending. Andrew Wang died in the UK in 2015 and collection efforts continued against his family. In 2017 Taiwan’s supreme court ordered the return of US$312.5 million in illegal proceeds held by the Wang family.

In 2019, the Taiwanese Supreme Court found that Bruno Wang's wife and eldest son could not be convicted of the crime of receiving kickbacks, even though they had received proceeds of the crime, as they were third parties.

In February 2021, the Federal Department of Justice and Police said that Switzerland will restitute nearly US$266 million to Taiwan. In July 2021 a Taiwanese high court ordered the return of US$520 million of illegal proceeds from the scandal which was in addition to the US$312.5 million ordered returned in 2017.

In 2021, Bruno Wang became embroiled in a cash-for-honours scandal over contributions to Prince Charles' charity The Prince's Foundation due to his links to the Taiwan frigate scandal.

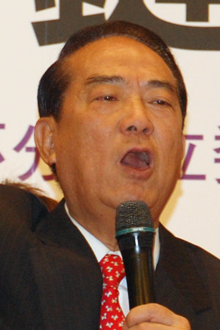
Taiwanese politician James Soong

In 2022, the Organized Crime and Corruption Reporting Project reported that James Soong had an account at Credit Suisse, which was revealed in the Suisse Secrets leak, connected to the scandal. Soong was the Secretary General of the ruling KMT party at the time kickbacks were being paid out. The millions of USD in the account could not be explained by Soong's reported earnings. The account is one of a number of things which have led to implications of his involvement in the Taiwan frigate scandal. Bruno Wang's sister, a UK-based socialite and entrepreneur involved in the entertainment industry, was named as a joint account holder along with Bruno in the Suisse Secrets leaks. When asked about the leaked accounts Bruno Wang's representative said he has "paid all proper taxes due and has not acted in any way improperly or unlawfully." In 2023, Switzerland returned $138 million to Taiwan in connection with the scandal and kept the other half as per its agreement with Taiwan.

In December 2022, the Constitutional Court of Taiwan rejected a case brought by Andrew Wang's heirs challenging the government's seizure of NT$14.65 billion from the deal. The judges ruled the seizure to be constitutional.

== See also ==
- Clearstream affair
- France–Taiwan relations
- Taiwan Mirage affair
- Lockheed bribery scandals
