= French Office, Taipei =

French Office in Taipei

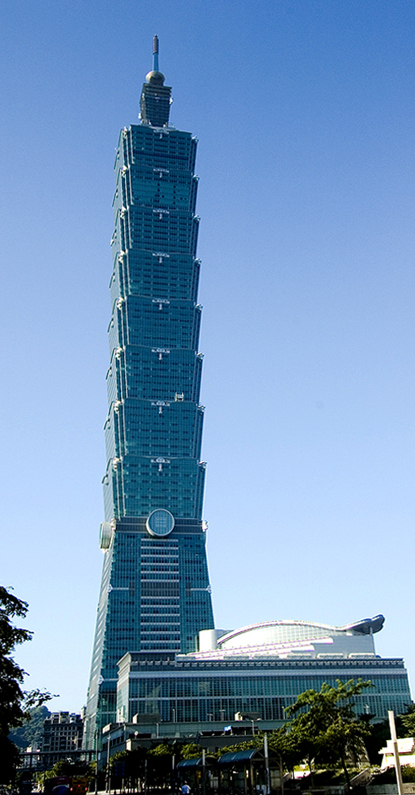
- Taipei 101 where the French office is located.

Agency overview
- Formed: 1989 (as French Institute); 2011 (as French Office)
- Jurisdiction: Republic of China
- Headquarters: 39F, Taipei 101, Xinyi, Taipei, Taiwan; 25°2′1″N 121°33′54″E
- Agency executive: Franck Paris, Director
- Website: Official website

The French Office in Taipei (French: Bureau français de Taipei, BFT; Chinese: 法國在台協會) is the representative office of France in Taiwan, functioning as a de facto embassy in the absence of formal diplomatic relations. Its counterpart in France is the Taipei Representative Office in Paris.

== History ==
The office was established in 1989 as the French Institute, before being renamed the French Office. It adopted its present name in 2011, although its Chinese language name has remained unchanged. On 23 February 2021, the French office re-located at its new premises on the 39th floor, Taipei 101.

== List of directors ==
Name	Photo	Tenure
Marc Menguy		1989-1993
Jean-Paul Réau		1993-1997
Gérard Roland Chesnel		1997-2000
Élisabeth Laurin		2000-2005
Jean-Claude Poimboeuf		2005-2008
Patrick Bonneville		2008-2010
Olivier Richard		2011-2015
Benoît Guidée		2015–2019
Jean-François Casabonne-Masonnave		2019-2023
Franck Paris		since 2023

== See also ==
- France–Taiwan relations
- List of diplomatic missions of France
- List of diplomatic missions in Taiwan
