= Clearstream affair =

Political scandal in France

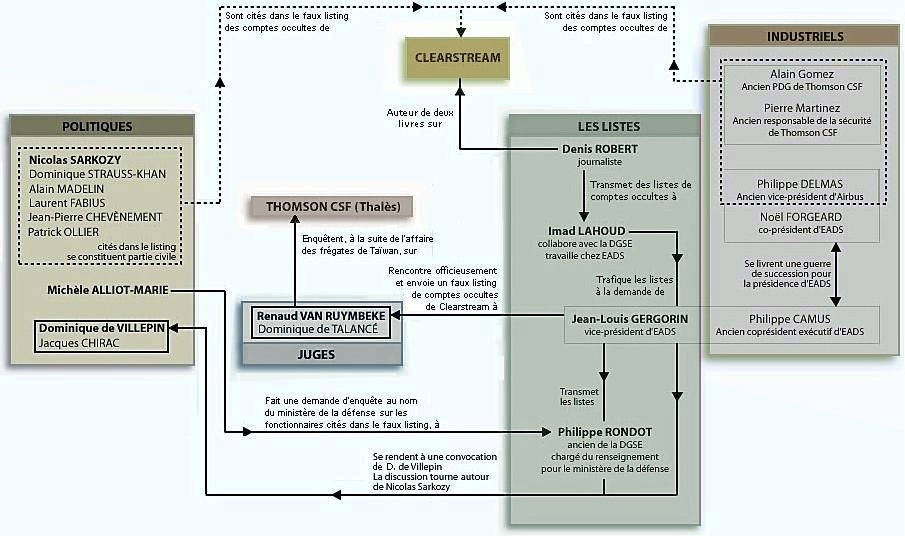

The Clearstream affair was a political scandal in France in the run-up to the 2007 presidential election.

The name refers to the Luxembourg-based Clearstream Banking SA, which was alleged to have aided many prominent French politicians and companies in tax evasion cases. It was also suggested that Clearstream might have helped French individuals and companies to launder money arising from bribery surrounding the 1991 sale of six La Fayette-class frigates to Taiwan (see Taiwan frigate scandal). Clearstream denied the allegations.

== Overview ==
Between 2001 and 2002, two books were published by co-authors Denis Robert and Ernest Backes, entitled Révélation$ and La Boîte Noire, accusing Clearstream of being a money laundering organisation and the worldwide centre for international financial crime committed by major banks, shell companies, and organised crime all over the world. An investigation opened by the Luxembourg authorities in 2001 found no evidence to support the authors' allegations, and the case was dismissed in 2004.

Subsequently, a list of accounts supposedly held by French individuals at Clearstream was sent anonymously to investigating magistrate Renaud van Ruymbeke on four occasions between May and October 2004. At that time, van Ruymbeke was investigating possible bribes in the 1991 frigate sale. The lists quickly proved to be false, and several of the people named on them pressed charges for "false denunciation". In the same year, additional anonymous letters and CD-Roms sent to French judges accused Clearstream of running secret accounts for criminals and senior French politicians. In late 2005, French investigating authorities officially declared the documents forgeries and dismissed the case.

Among those pressing charges was prominent French politician Nicolas Sarkozy, who was preparing his (ultimately successful) campaign for the presidency. Sarkozy's main political rival on the right wing of French politics at the time was Interior Minister Dominique de Villepin, who became Prime Minister of France in 2005. It later transpired that De Villepin had known about the existence of the lists since at least January 2004. As interior minister, he would also have known that French secret services considered the lists to be forgeries. He did not, however, pass this information on to Judge Van Ruymbeke. De Villepin was indicted on charges of complicity to false denunciation on 18 November 2008, and tried at the Paris Correctional Court in September and October 2009. He was acquitted of the charges on 28 January 2010. Three co-defendants were convicted for their roles in the affair, while a fifth person was acquitted.

== In popular culture ==
In 2014 Vincent Garenq directed a film about the event, The Clearstream Affair (French title: L'Enquête).

== See also ==
- France–Taiwan relations
- Taiwan Mirage affair
