= Wu Chih-chung =

Taiwanese political scientist and diplomat

- 吳志中
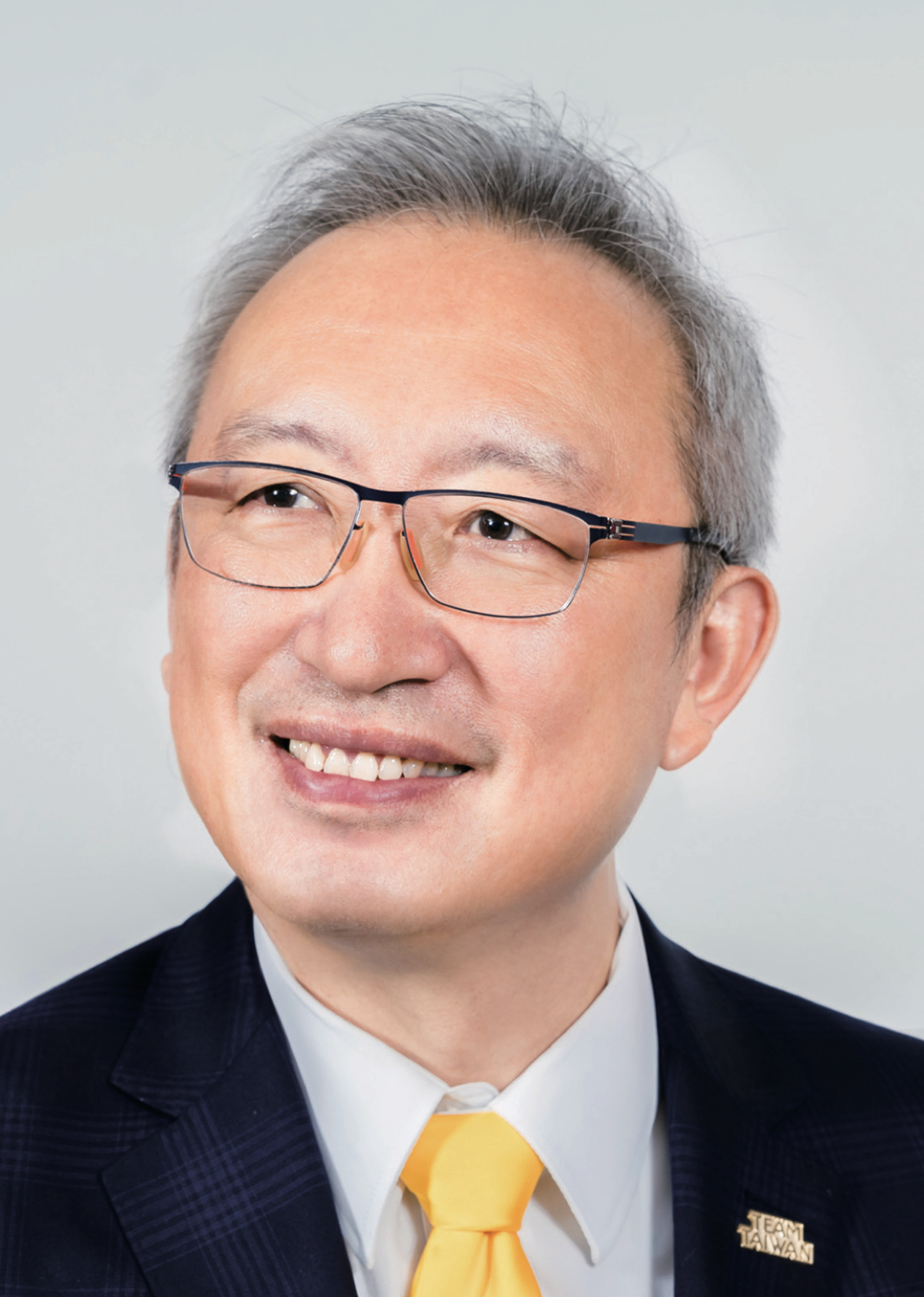
- Official portrait, 2025

Deputy Minister of Foreign Affairs
- Incumbent
- Assumed office 11 August 2024
- Minister: Lin Chia-lung
- Preceded by: Kelly Hsieh
- In office 20 May 2016 – 15 July 2018
- Minister: David Lee; Joseph Wu
- Preceded by: Bruce Linghu
- Succeeded by: Hsu Szu-chien

9th Ambassador of Taiwan to France
- In office 16 July 2018 – August 2024
- President: Tsai Ing-wen; Lai Ching-te
- Preceded by: Zhang Ming-zhong
- Succeeded by: Hao Pei-chih

Personal details
- Parent: Wu Rong-i (father)
- Education: Aletheia University (BS); École des hautes études en sciences sociales (licencié); Paris Dauphine University (MSc); Paris 8 University Vincennes-Saint-Denis (MSc); Pantheon-Sorbonne University (MSc, PhD)

Wu Chih-chung (Chinese: 吳志中; pinyin: Wú Zhìzhōng), also known by his French name François Wu, is a Taiwanese political scientist and diplomat who has been the deputy minister of the Ministry of Foreign Affairs since 2024. He previously served in the position from May 2016 to July 2018 and as the Ambassador of Taiwan in France from July 2018 to August 2024.

== Education ==
After graduating from Aletheia University with a bachelor's degree in computer science, Wu studied in Paris, France, from 1989 to 1998. He earned a licence (bachelor's degree) from the School for Advanced Studies in the Social Sciences, a master's degree in political science from Paris Dauphine University, a second master's degree in geopolitics from Paris 8 University Vincennes-Saint-Denis, and a third master's degree in diplomacy and then his Ph.D. in political science from Paris 1 Panthéon-Sorbonne University in 1998.

Wu's doctoral dissertation, competed under French political historian Charles Zorgbibe, was "The Regionalist Conception of the Asia-Pacific: A Study of its Evolution through the Development and Institutionalization of its International Organizations" (La conception régionaliste de l'Asie-Pacifique: une étude de son évolution à travers le développement et l'institutionnalisation de ses organisations internationales).

== Professional experience ==
After returning to Taiwan, he has worked as a professor at Soochow University in the Department of Political Science. His areas of expertise are geopolitics, diplomatic history, EU foreign policy, post-war world situation, French government and French politics.

Due to his experience and expertise of international relations and European affairs, he has been recruited by several public or private institutions for advisory positions, such as Taipei and Taichung City Government, Ministry of Foreign Affairs and Ministry of Education, etc.

As the president and later the honorary president of Alliance Française in Taiwan, he has been relentlessly promoting the exchange between Taiwan and France. In 2014, he was appointed by the French President François Hollande as a Knight of the French National Order of Merit.

== Political career ==
During the Presidency of Tsai Ing-wen, he was appointed Deputy Minister of Foreign Affairs serving from 20 May 2016 to 15 July 2018 when he was appointed Ambassador of Taiwan to France.

During the Presidency of Lai Ching-te, he was re-appointed Deputy Minister of Foreign Affairs and will assume office after the 2024 Summer Olympics in Paris.

== Personal life ==
Wu is the son of Wu Rong-i, who served as the Deputy Prime Minister (Vice Premier of the Executive Yuan) of Taiwan in the cabinet of Frank Hsieh from 2005 to 2006.
