= Paul Gygli =

Swiss army officer (1909–1992)

- Born: 27 January 1909; Langnau im Emmental, Switzerland
- Died: 10 July 1992 (aged 83); Bern, Switzerland
- Spouse: Alice Stalder (m. 1935)
- Military career
- Allegiance: Switzerland
- Branch: Swiss Army
- Commands: 7th Division (1958–1961); Mechanized Division 11 (1962–1963); Field Army Corps 4 (1964); Chief of the General Staff (appointed 1964)

Paul Gygli (27 January 1909 – 10 July 1992) was a Swiss army officer. In 1964 the Federal Council appointed him chief of the general staff to regain the public trust damaged by the Mirages affair. During his term numerous modern weapon systems were acquired, among them the Panzer 68 and the Florida air defense system, and the troop organization of 1961 was implemented.

== Biography ==
Paul Gygli was born on 27 January 1909 in Langnau im Emmental, the son of Rudolf Gygli, a notary. In 1935 he married Alice Stalder, daughter of Ernst Stalder, a merchant.

After two semesters at the Rütti agricultural school (Landwirtschaftliche Schule Rütti) in Zollikofen, Gygli studied law in Bern and completed his studies in 1932 with a doctorate in law (Dr. iur.).

From 1934 to 1951 Gygli was an instruction officer of the artillery, and in 1941 he became a general staff officer. From 1952 to 1955 he was military attaché in London. He held various troop commands: from 1958 to 1961 he was commander of the 7th Division, in 1962–1963 of the Mechanized Division 11 (Mechanisierte Division 11) and in 1964 of the Field Army Corps 4 (Feldarmeekorps 4).

To regain the public trust damaged by the Mirages affair, the Federal Council appointed Gygli chief of the general staff in 1964. During his term numerous modern weapon systems were acquired, among them the Panzer 68 tank and the Florida air defense system, and the troop organization of 1961 (Truppenordnung 61) was implemented. He also ended the dispute over the shape of the army, which had lasted for years, with the concept of 6 June 1966. In 1967 he initiated the creation of the study commission for strategic questions (Studienkommission für strategische Fragen), chaired by Karl Schmid.

After his resignation as chief of the general staff, Gygli joined the board of directors of Oerlikon Bührle AG in 1971. He died in Bern on 10 July 1992.

== Bibliography ==
- Der Schweizerische Generalstab, 8, 157–158
- Neue Zürcher Zeitung, 16 July 1992
