= Mirages affair =

1964 Swiss military procurement scandal

Mirages Affair
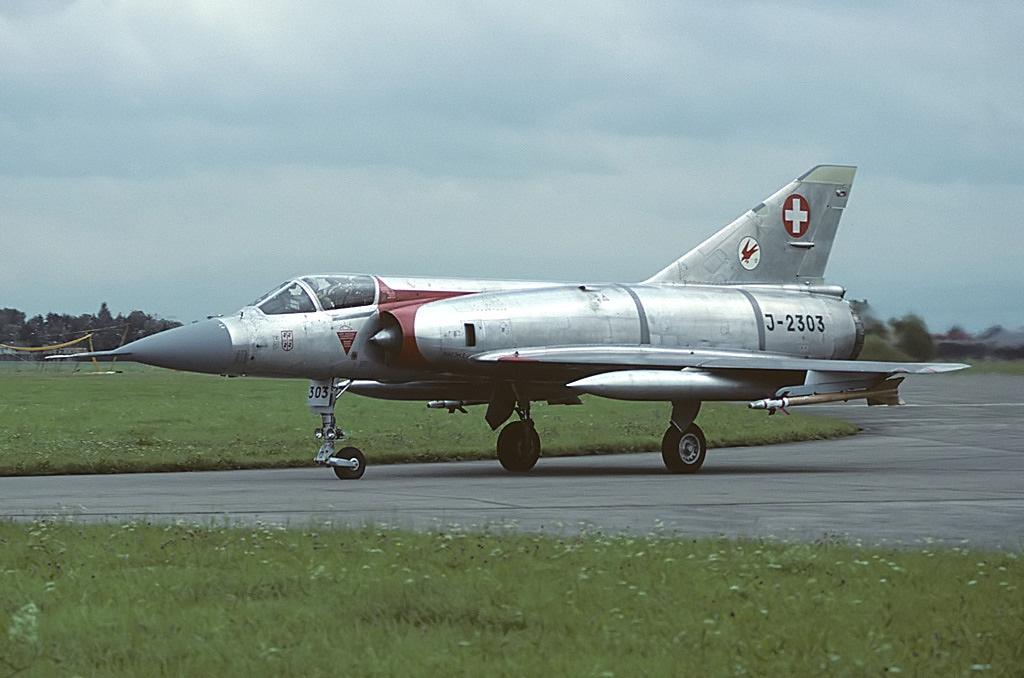
- Date: 1961–1964
- Location: Switzerland
- Outcome: Reduction of aircraft order, parliamentary inquiry, political resignations, regulatory changes

The Mirage Affair was a major political and military procurement scandal in Switzerland in 1964, involving significant cost overruns in the acquisition of Mirage fighter aircraft. The affair led to the creation of Switzerland's first parliamentary inquiry committee. The chief of the general staff and the chief of aviation left their posts, and in 1966 the head of the Military Department, a Federal Councillor, resigned.

== Background ==
On 21 June 1961, the Federal Assembly voted to acquire 100 Mirage combat aircraft for the Swiss Air Force and approved a credit of 871 million Swiss francs for this purpose.

== Cost overruns and parliamentary inquiry ==
On 4 May 1964, the Federal Council requested an additional credit of 356 million francs, along with 220 million for cost increases. The announcement caused considerable surprise among the public. Parliament had not been informed of all costs, which had been increased by the decision to build the Mirages under license in Switzerland, equip them with enhancements (such as the choice of electronics), and make them capable of various missions (multi-role capability).

Parliament, feeling it had been deceived, refused to consider the matter and on 17 June 1964 created the first parliamentary inquiry committee in its history, following a proposal by National Councillor Kurt Furgler, who became its president. The report delivered on 1 September was damning: the Military Department was accused of having deceived the government, the legislature, and public opinion. On 24 September the National Council voted to reduce the number of aircraft from 100 to 57, and the Council of States followed on 7 October. In the end, there were only 36 fighter aircraft, as the desired multi-role capability proved impossible; 12 aircraft were assigned to reconnaissance and the others to pilot training.

== Consequences ==
Those responsible were sanctioned. On 7 October 1964 the president of the Confederation, Ludwig von Moos, told the Council of States what the Federal Council had decided. Divisionnaire Etienne Primault, chief of aviation, was suspended for the rest of 1964, and the Federal Council dispensed with his services from 1 January 1965. The chief of the general staff, Jakob Annasohn, had offered his resignation, but the Federal Council asked him to stay in office for the time being. On 10 November it appointed Paul Gygli as his successor, and Annasohn left the post at the end of 1964 to take on other tasks. Several parliamentarians had demanded the resignation of the head of the Military Department, Paul Chaudet. He resigned on 28 November 1966, after leading members of his own Radical Party made clear that they would not back him for vice-president of the Federal Council for 1967. From a military perspective, the affair called into question the defence concept chosen in 1961.

To prevent such a situation from recurring, parliamentary oversight was strengthened (for example, through the creation of the Documentation Service of the Federal Assembly) and the Military Department was given the organizational and expertise resources necessary for the preparation of such projects.

== See also ==
- Arthur Moll
- History of the Swiss Air Force

== Bibliography ==
- Geiger, Willi: "Der Mirage-Konflikt. Seine Entstehung, Lösung und grundsätzliche Bedeutung", in: Annuaire suisse de science politique, 5, 1965, pp. 90–99.
- Urio, Paolo: L'affaire des Mirages. Décision administrative et contrôle parlementaire, 1972.
- Braun, Peter: Der Bogen darf nicht überspannt werden. Die Suche nach einer neuen Luftverteidigungskonzeption Ende der fünfziger Jahre und die Beschaffung des Mirage III S, master's thesis, University of Zurich, 2000.
- Braun, Peter: "Die Nuklearbewaffnungsoption der Mirage III S", in: ASMZ, 166/4, 2000, pp. 12–13.
