= Taiwan Mirage affair =

Sales of Mirage 2000-5 to ROCAF

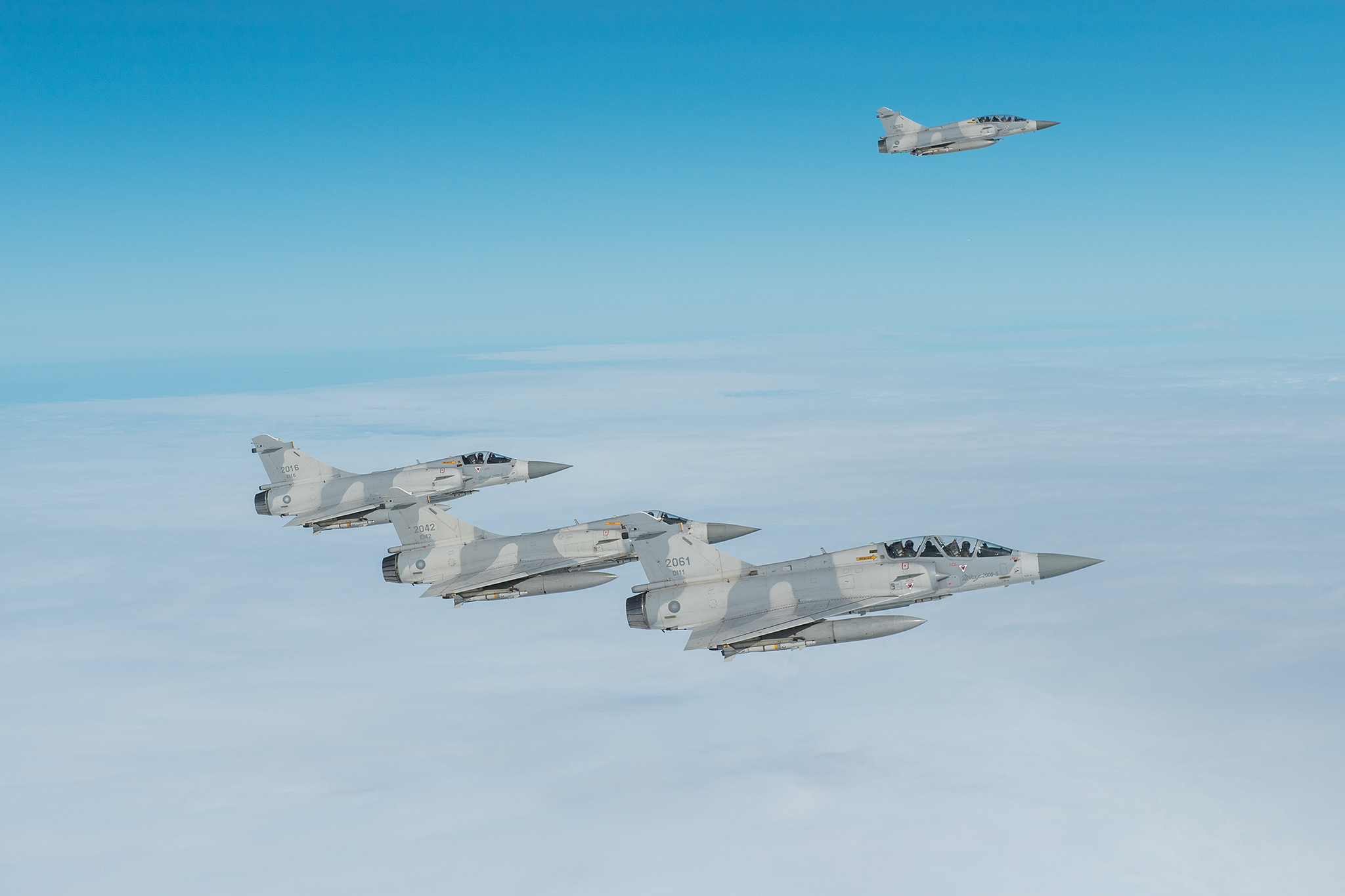
Mirage 2000EI fighter jets of the Republic of China Air Force in October 2017.

The Taiwan Mirage affair involved an arms deal signed in 1992, in which Dassault Aviation, missile manufacturer Matra (later MBDA), Thomson-CSF (later Thales) and Snecma (later Safran Aircraft Engines) would supply 60 Mirage 2000 fighter jets armed with MICA missiles to the Republic of China Air Force in Taiwan. Taiwan eventually received compensation.

== Inquiry in France ==
French judge Renaud Van Ruymbeke started investigating the affair in 2000 along with another inquiry about the Taiwan frigate scandal.

In September 2004, Serge Dassault put pressure on the editors of the newspaper Le Figaro, which he owns through Socpresse, not to publish an interview with Andrew Wang, the main arms dealer involved. The interview was eventually published in the newsmagazine Le Point in September 2004.

== Arbitration between Taiwan and the suppliers ==
In 2017, the Permanent Court of Arbitration ordered Dassault Aviation, Thales, Safran, and MBDA to pay the sum of 226 million euros to Taiwan for the commissions they paid against the contractual provisions of the arms deal.

== See also ==
- Clearstream affair
- France–Taiwan relations
