= Hao Pei-chih =

Taiwanese politician and diplomat (born 1968)

Hao Pei-chih (Chinese: 郝培芝; born 6 October 1968) is a Taiwanese political scientist, politician, and diplomat serving as the Taiwanese representative to France since September 2024.

== Education and academic career ==
Hao graduated from Taipei Municipal First Girls' Senior High School and National Taiwan University, then earned her master's and doctoral degrees from Pantheon-Sorbonne University. Upon returning to Taiwan, Hao held a professorship at National Taipei University, and from 2007 to 2009 was an adviser to the Mainland Affairs Council. In an academic capacity, Hao has discussed efforts to contain China made by the United States, China's changing views of Taiwan's political status, the effects of colonialism, and the administrative oversight functions of the Legislative Yuan. The Taipei Times has published Hao's views on China's Anti-Secession Law of 2005, and on Taiwan–European Union relations.

== Public service career ==
Hao was appointed vice chair of the Civil Service Protection and Training Commission in 2016. By 2020, she had been elevated to head the commission. As commission leader, Hao added English-language proficiency training for Taiwanese public servants. She concurrently led the Examination Yuan's National Academy of Civil Service. In September 2024, Hao succeeded Wu Chih-chung as Taiwanese Representative to France, and became the first woman to serve in that role. The following month, Hao commented on Tsai Ing-wen's visit to the French Senate, the first such visit by a former Taiwanese president since 1996.

== Personal life ==
Hao is married to Hsu Yu-wei.
