= Taipei Representative Office, Paris =

Taipei Representative Office in France
- Bureau de représentation de Taipei en France 駐法國台北代表處

Agency overview
- Formed: 1972 (as Association pour la promotion des échanges commerciaux et touristiques avec Taïwan)
- Jurisdiction: France; Andorra; Monaco; Algeria; Egypt; Libya; Mauritania; Morocco; Tunisia; West Sahara
- Headquarters: Paris, France
- Agency executive: Hao Pei-chih, Representative
- Website: Bureau de Représentation de Taipei en France

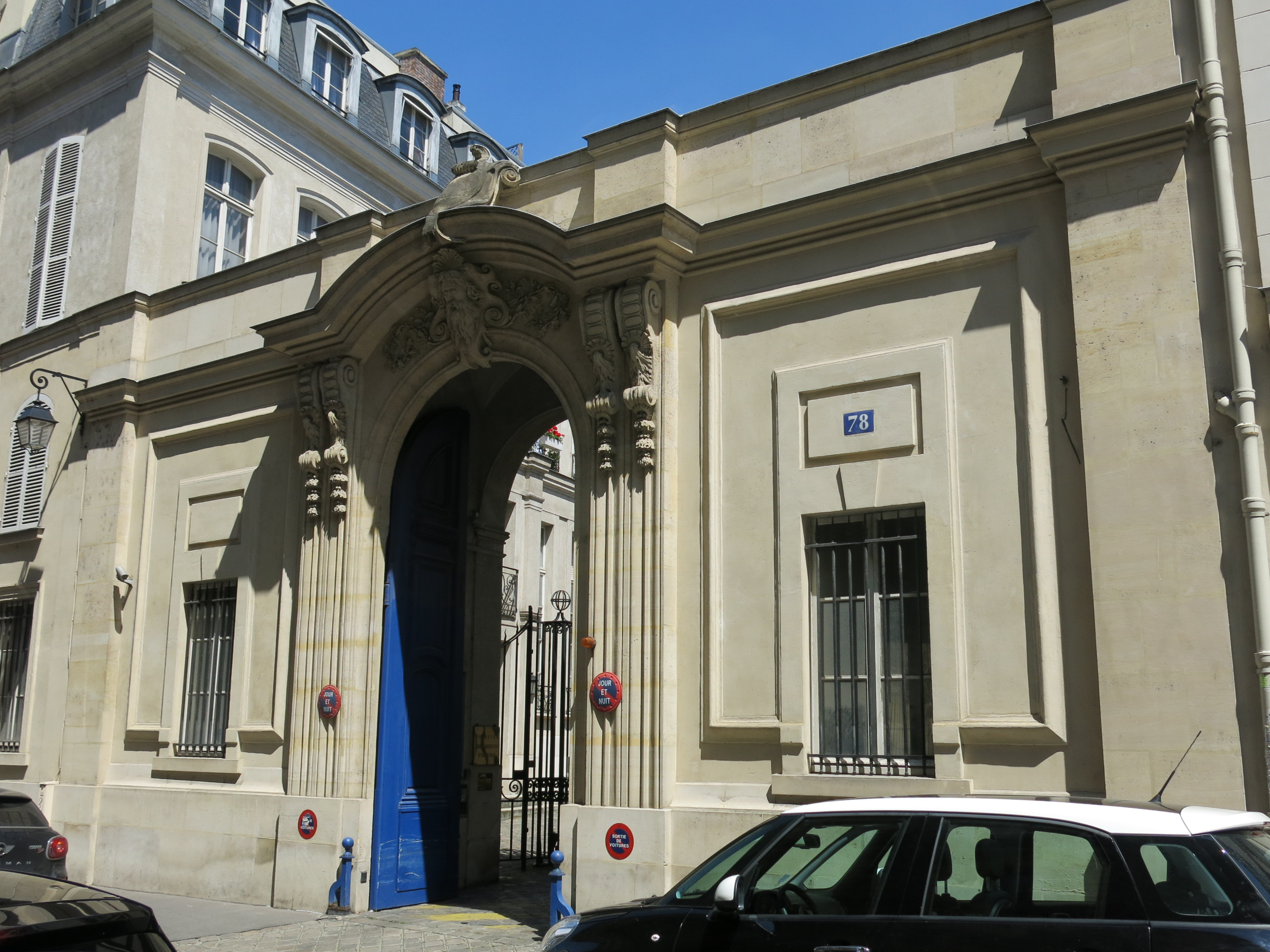
Entrance

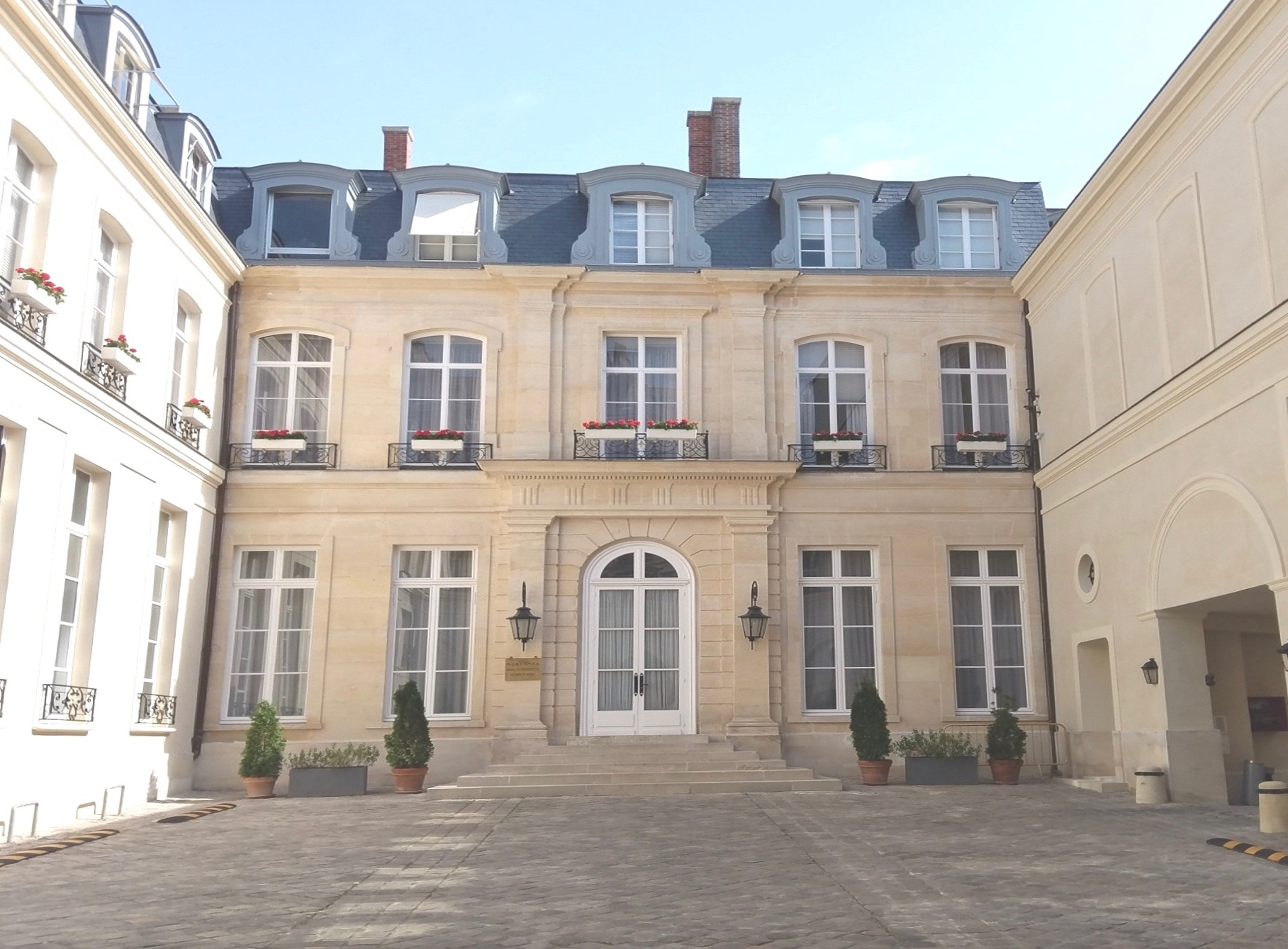
The façade and the court of the Office

The Taipei Representative Office in France; (Chinese: 駐法國台北代表處; pinyin: Zhù Fàguó Táiběi Dàibiǎo Chù, French: Bureau de représentation de Taipei en France) represents the interests of Taiwan in France in the absence of formal diplomatic relations, functioning as a de facto embassy. Its counterpart in Taiwan is the French Office in Taipei.

== Introduction ==
It was established in 1972 as the Association for the Promotion of Commercial and Tourist Exchanges with Taiwan (Association pour la promotion des échanges commerciaux et touristiques avec Taïwan, ASPECT), before adopting its present name in 1995. It provides different services to the general public and different public and private institutions in France with an aim to promote the relations between ROC (Taiwan) and France and to facilitate exchanges in different fields.

The Office is headed by a Representative, currently Wu Chih-chung. A fluent French speaker, he was appointed to the post in July 2018, having earlier served as Deputy Minister of Foreign Affairs of the Republic of China from 2016 to 2018.

The Office is currently located at 78, rue de l’Université - 75007 in l’Hôtel Hocquart, a historical monument built in 1754 with the style of late-Louis XV. An annex office in Aix-en-Provence was opened in 2020.

Organization

The Office is formed by the officials dispatched from the Ministries of Foreign Affairs, Economic Affairs, Culture, Education, Science and Technology and the Overseas Community Affairs Council. The Office is composed of different divisions according to their functions, such as Divisions of Politics, Parliamentary Affairs, Communication, Consular Affairs, Administration, Economic Affairs, Culture, Education and Overseas Residents.

Function

The Office promotes the economic, cultural, educational, scientific and technological exchanges between Taiwan and France. It also provides different consular services and maintain good relations with the overseas community. The Education division is also responsible for the exchanges with Spain, Portugal, and Italy; [The Science and Technology division] is also responsible for Spain, Portugal, Italy and Greece; as for the Taiwan Cultural Center in Paris (Centre Culturel de Taïwan à Paris) is responsible for the cultural exchanges with Switzerland, Netherlands, Belgium, Luxembourg, Monaco, Andorra and Liechtenstein.

== Recent Representatives ==
- Kung Sainting (December 1980 – August 1990)
- Chiou Jong-nan (November 1990 – November 1996)
- Kuo Wei-fan (July 1997 – August 2001)
- Hsieh Hsin-ping (August 2001 – November 2002)
- Chiou Jong-nan (November 2002 – September 2005)
- Yang Tzu-pao (September 2005 – September 2006)
- Michel Ching-long Lu (January 2007 – July 2015)
- Zhang Ming-zhong (July 2015 – July 2018)
- Wu Chih-chung (July 2018 – August 2024)
- Hao Pei-chih (1 September 2024 – present)
