= Military ranks of Switzerland =

The ranks of the Swiss Armed Forces have changed little over the centuries, except for the introduction, in 2008, of new senior enlisted and non-commissioned officer ranks. The ranks are worn on shoulder boards with the appropriate background colour. Designations are given in the four national languages (German, French, Italian and Romansh), with an English translation which is used during overseas missions.

== Enlisted ranks ==
=== Enlisted troops ===
Rank insignia		Name					Description
Epaulette	Camouflage	German	French	Italian	Romansh	English designation	Description
No rank insignia		Rekrut (Rekr)	Recrue (recr)	Recluta	Recruit	Recruit	This rank is a position during the 4 months of Recruit School. A recruit gets promoted to E-1 after the Recruit School.
OR-1 - Private E-1	OR-1 - Private E-1	Soldat (Sdt)	Soldat (Sdt)	Soldato	Schuldà	Private E-1	
OR-2 - Private E-2	OR-2 - Private E-2	Gefreiter (Gfr)	Appointé (App)	Appuntato	Appuntà	Private E-2	E-1 Privates can be promoted to E-2 after a minimum of 20 days' service in a refresher course, subject to good performance. E-2 Privates also receive 7.5 CHF daily pay (as opposed to 6 CHF prior to promotion)
OR-3 - Private first class	OR-3 - Private first class	Obergefreiter (Obgfr)	Appointé-chef (App chef)	Appuntato capo	Primappuntà	Private first class	The rank "Obergefreiter" was removed as of 1 January 2019 with the WEA of the Swiss Army. However those soldiers previously awarded this rank are able to keep it.

=== Non-commissioned officers (NCO) ===
Rank insignia		Name					Description
Epaulette	Camouflage	German	French	Italian	Romansh	English designation	Description
OR-4 - Corporal	OR-4 - Corporal	Korporal (Kpl)	Caporal (Cpl)	Caporale (Cpl)	Caporal (Cpl)	Corporal	Soldiers in this rank serve as specialist NCOs (e.g. arms specialization, CBRN specialization, postal soldiers). Since 2019, no new promotions into this rank are being issued anymore due to the Development of the Swiss Army project.
OR-5a - Sergeant	OR-5a - Sergeant	Wachtmeister (Wm)	Sergent (Sgt)	Sergente (Sgt)	Sergent (Sgt)	Sergeant	Currently, the standard junior NCO rank
OR-5b - Sergeant first class	OR-5b - Sergeant first class	Oberwachtmeister (Obwm)	Sergent chef (Sgt chef)	Sergente capo (Sgt capo)	Caposergent (Csgt)	Sergeant first class	This rank is awarded to Sergeants who receive very good performance assessments. Holders of this rank are appointed to be the platoon leader's replacement and serve an additional 10 days compared to the standard Sergeant rank.

=== Higher NCOs ===
Rank insignia		Name					Description
Epaulette	Camouflage	German	French	Italian	Romansh	English designation	Description
OR-6 - Sergeant major	OR-6 - Sergeant major	Feldweibel (Fw)	Sergent-major (Sgtm)	Sergente maggiore (Sgtm)	Primsergent (Psgt)	Sergeant major	Lowest rank of "Higher non-commissioned officers" (NCO); it used to be a higher rank than Feldweibel and to oversee unit-level military service and operations. Since the 2003 reform a specialist rank only. Nowadays, Feldweibel are mainly seen in military police, NBC and other specialist units.
OR-7a - Quartermaster sergeant	OR-7a - Quartermaster sergeant	Fourier (Four)	Fourrier (Four)	Furiere (Fur)	Furier (Fur)	Quartermaster sergeant	The higher NCO who administers a company's finances, subsistence and lodging.
OR-7b - Chief sergeant major	OR-7b - Chief sergeant major	Hauptfeldweibel (Hptfw)	Sergent-major chef (Sgtm chef)	Sergente maggiore capo (sgtm capo)	Capoprimsergent (cpsgt)	Chief sergeant major	The Hauptfeldweibel oversees unit-level military service and operations.
WO-1 - Warrant officer	WO-1 - Warrant officer	Adjutant Unteroffizier (Adj Uof)	Adjudant sous-officier (Adj Sof)	Aiutante sottufficiale (aiut suff)	Adjutant sutuffizier (Adj suff)	Warrant officer	
WO-2 - Staff warrant officer	WO-2 - Staff warrant officer	Stabsadjutant (Stabsadj)	Adjudant d'état-major (Adj EM)	Aiutante di stato maggiore (aiut SM)	Adjutant da stab (Adj S)	Staff warrant officer	Battalion warrant officer
WO-3 - Master warrant officer	WO-3 - Master warrant officer	Hauptadjutant (Hptadj)	Adjudant-major (Adjm)	Aiutante maggiore (Aiut magg)	Adjutant principal (Adj prin)	Master warrant officer	Brigade warrant officer
WO-4 - Chief warrant officer	WO-4 - Chief warrant officer	Chefadjutant (Chefadj)	Adjudant-chef (Adj chef)	Aiutante capo (Aiut capo)	Schefadjutant (Schefadj)	Chief warrant officer	Division warrant officer

== Officers ==
=== Subaltern officers and captains ===
Rank insignia		Name					Description
Epaulette	Camouflage	German	French	Italian	Romansh	English designation	Description
OF-1a - Second lieutenant	OF-1a - Second lieutenant	Leutnant (Lt)	Lieutenant (Lt)	Tenente (Ten)	Litenet (Lt)	Second lieutenant	Platoon's leader. Promotion to First Lieutenant occurs after a minimum of 3 refresher courses (subject to good performance) or after 6 refresher courses.
OF-1b - First lieutenant	OF-1b - First lieutenant	Oberleutnant (Oblt)	Premier-lieutenant (Plt)	Primo tenente (I ten)	Primlitenant (Plt)	First lieutenant	Platoon's leader, future company commander or new officers in battalion's staff (S1, 2, 4 & 6).
OF-2 - Captain	OF-2 - Captain	Hauptmann (Hptm)	Capitaine (Cap)	Capitano (Cap)	Chapitani (Chap)	Captain	Company commander or officer in battalion's staff (S1, 2, 4 & 6).

=== Staff officers, specialist ===
Rank insignia		Name					Description
Epaulette	Camouflage	German	French	Italian	Romansh	English designation	Description
OF-3 - Major	OF-3 - Major	Major (Maj)	Major (Maj)	Maggiore (Magg)	Maior (Mai)	Major	Several assignments in a battalion's staff (Chief of Staff or S3), under special circumstances appointment to battalion commander, teacher or staff officer on a military academy, commander of a HQ company, staff officer in large units (BDE).
OF-4 - Lieutenant colonel	OF-4 - Lieutenant colonel	Oberstleutnant (Oberstlt)	Lieutenant-colonel (Lt col)	Tenente colonnello (Ten col)	Litinent colonel (Lt col)	Lieutenant colonel	Battalion commander, staff officer in large units (BDE).
OF-5 - Colonel	OF-5 - Colonel	Oberst (Oberst)	Colonel (Col)	Colonnello (Col)	Colonel (Col)	Colonel	Under special circumstances appointment to battalion commander, deputy commander of a brigade, staff officer in larger units (BDE).
Specialist officer	Specialist officer	Fachoffizier (FachOf)	Officier spécialiste (Of spéc)	Ufficiale specialista (Uff spec)	Uffizier spezialist (Uff spez)	Specialist officer	"Specialist Officer", Duties authority and pay grade vary from OF-1 to OF-5.

=== Higher staff officers ===
Higher staff officers wear black lampasses on the outside seam of dress uniform trousers.

Rank insignia			Name					Description
Epaulette	Camouflage	Kepi	German	French	Italian	Romansh	English designation	Description
OF-6 - Brigadier general	OF-6 - Brigadier general		Brigadier (Br)	Brigadier (Br)	Brigadiere	Brigadier	Brigadier general	One-star rank, commander of a brigade, also military attaché
OF-7 - Major general	OF-7 - Major general		Divisionär (Div)	Divisionnaire (div)	Divisionario	Divisionar	Major general	Two-star rank, commander of territorial division, also in an Army HQ or staff.
OF-8 - Lieutenant general	OF-8 - Lieutenant general		Korpskommandant (KKdt)	Commandant de corps (cdt C)	Comandante di corpo	Cumandant da corp	Lieutenant general	Three-star rank, also the rank of the Chief of the Armed Forces, highest rank in peacetime.

=== Commander-in-chief of the Armed Forces ===
Rank insignia			Name					Description
Epaulette	Camouflage	Kepi	German	French	Italian	Romansh	English designation	Description
OF-9 - General of the Army	OF-9 - General of the Army		General (Gen)	Général	Generale	General	General	The rank is assigned only during times of war, when the Federal Assembly chooses one general to command the entire Swiss military. Otherwise the word "general" is not used.

== Shoulder board colour ==
Colour	Branch	Examples
Black	Staff officers, general staff, engineers, intelligence, chaplains, educational psychology, availability corps, social service corps, sport	
Dark green	Infantry, military bands	
Yellow	Armored corps	
Mustard yellow	NBC defense	
Red	Artillery	
Dark blue	Air force, anti-air force	
Light grey	Command support corps	
Burgundy	Rescue corps	
Plum	Logistic corps	
Purple	Military justice	
Royal blue	Medical corps, Red Cross corps	
Dark grey	Military police	
Khaki	Special forces	
Orange	Territorial corps	

== Timeline of ranks ==
Officers

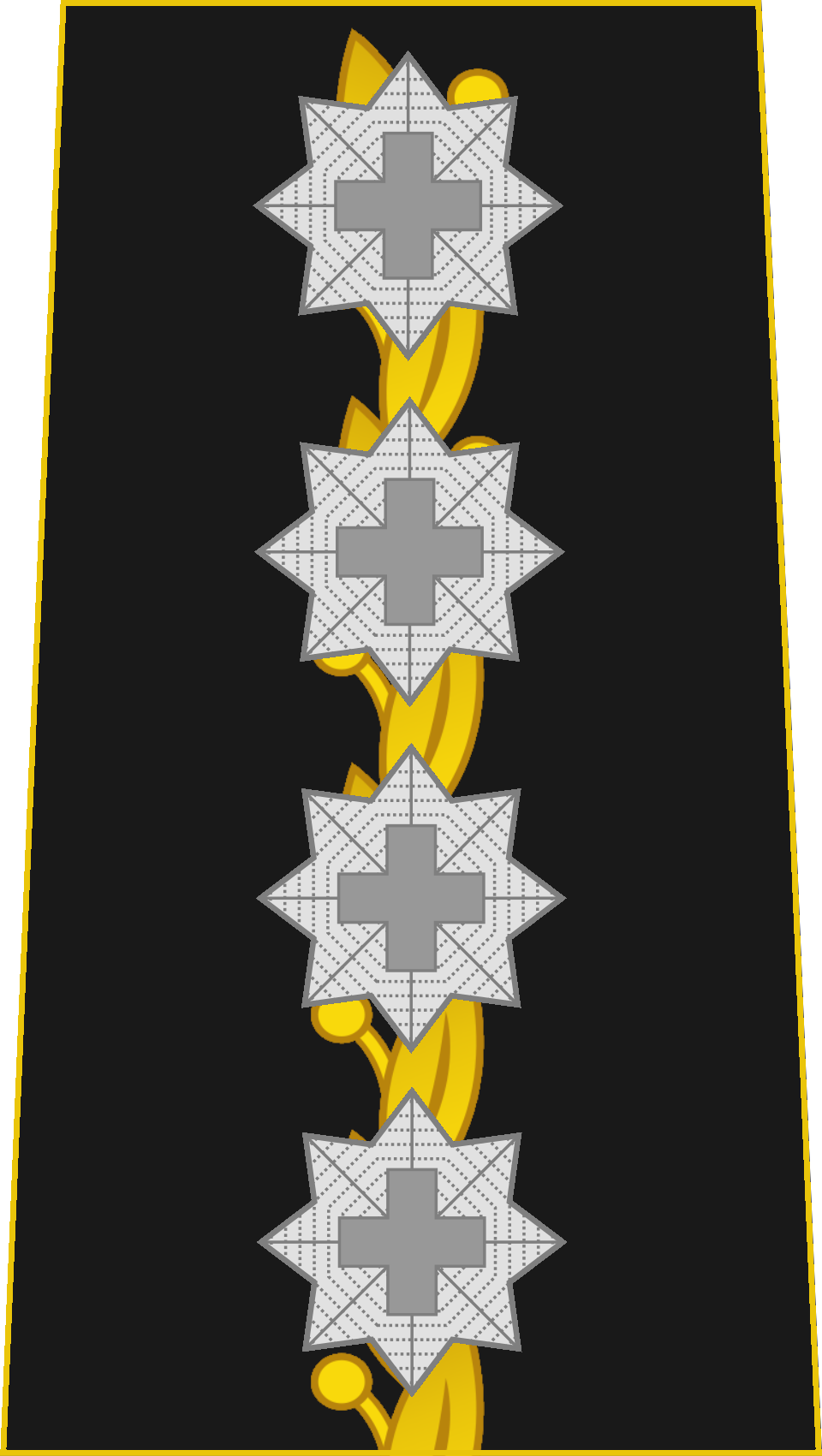
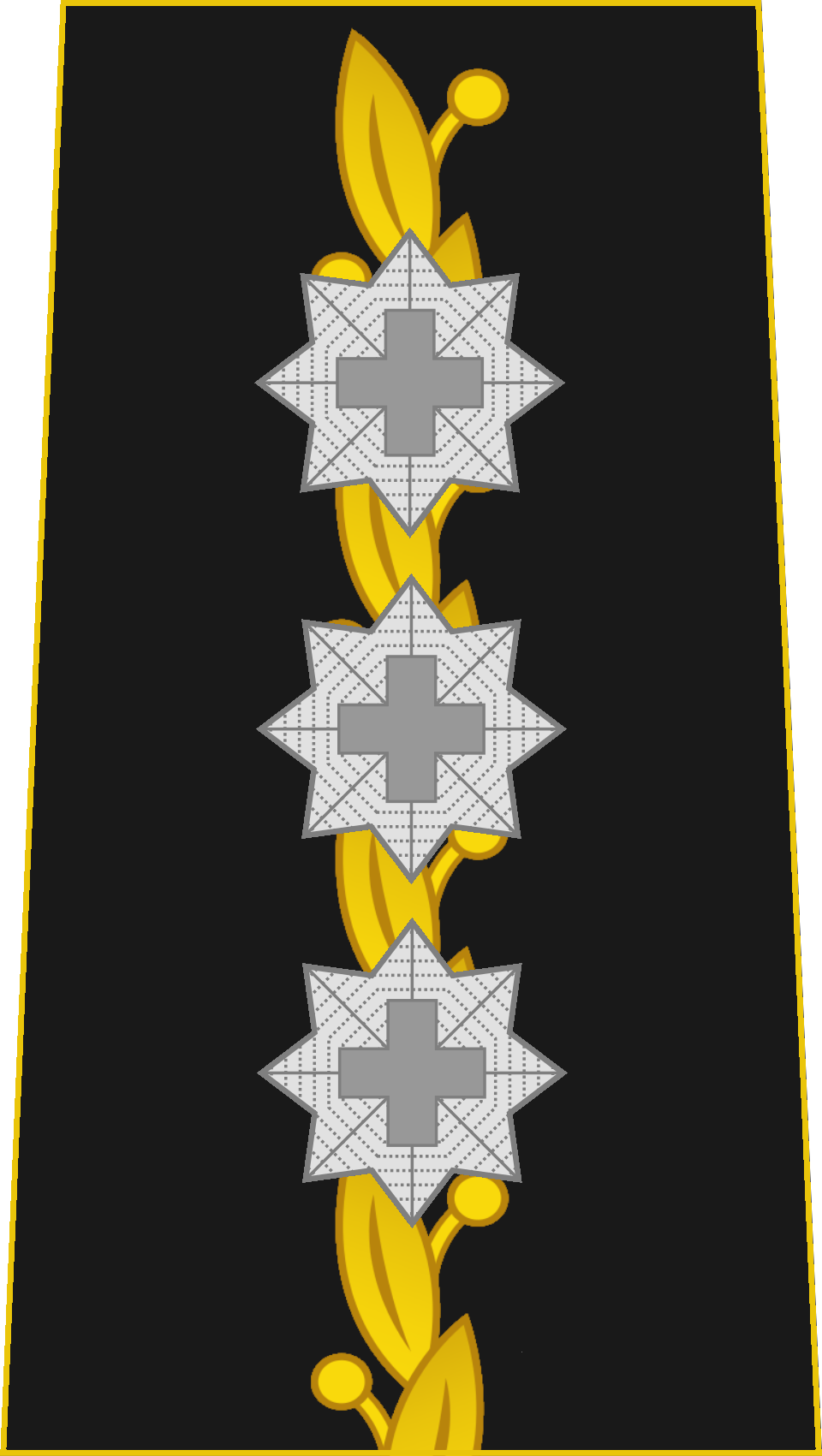
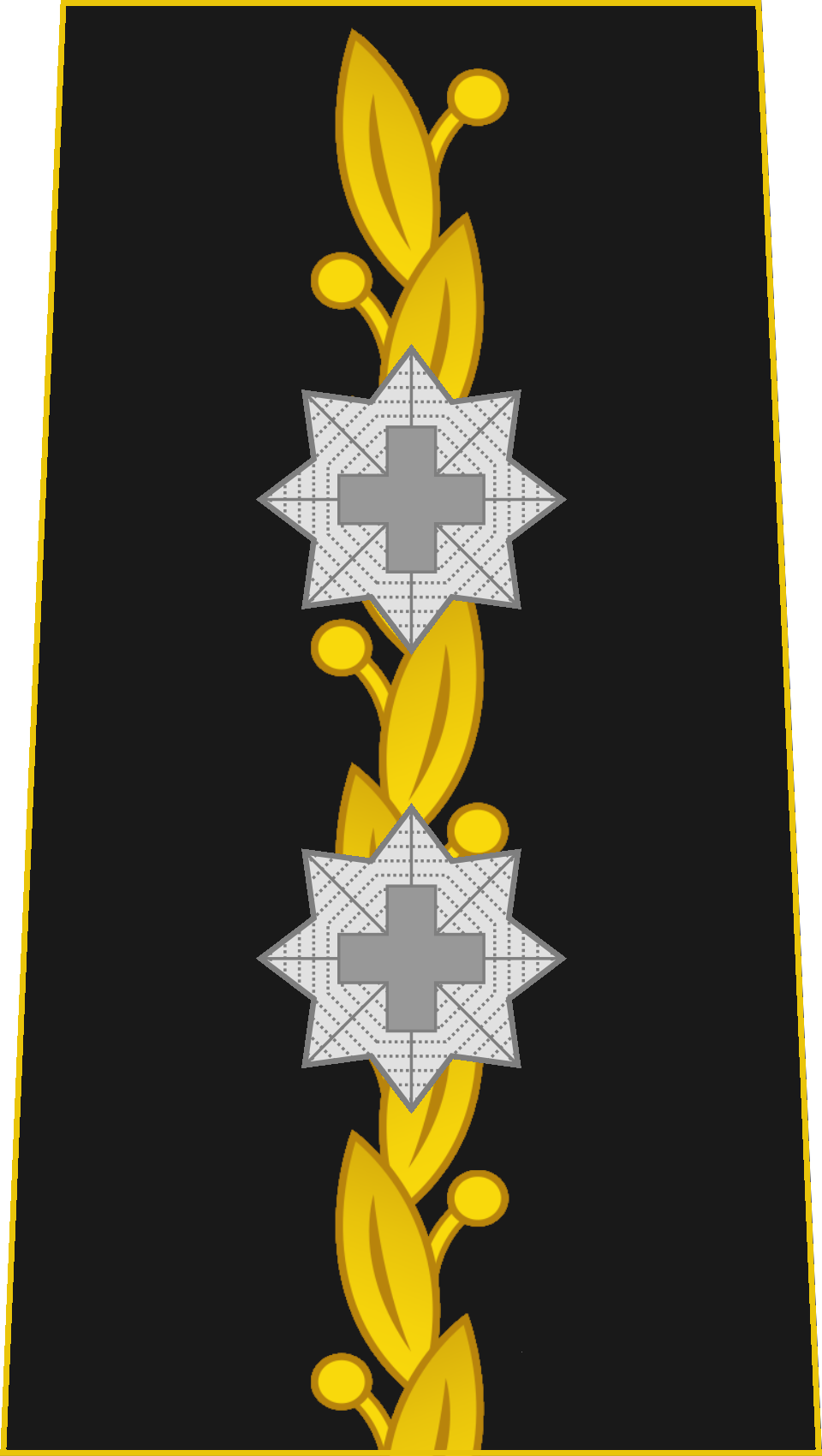
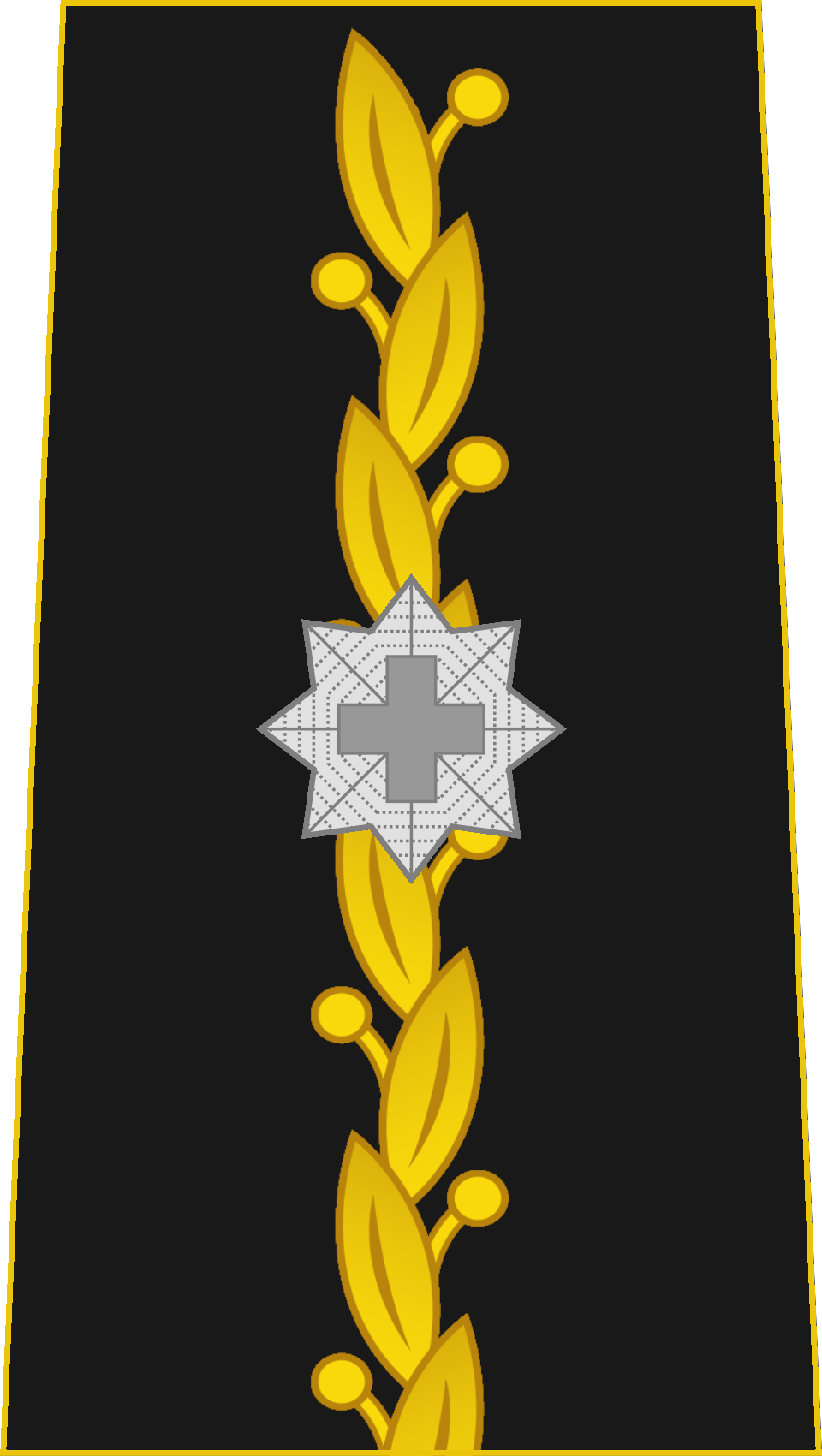
Rank group	General / flag officers				Senior officers			Junior officers
(c. 1898)
(c. 1914)	General[1]	Corps General	Division General		Colonel	Lieutenant Colonel	Major	Captain	First Lieutenant	Lieutenant
	General	Armeekorpskommandant	Oberstdivisionär		Oberst	Oberstleutnant	Major	Hauptmann	Oberleutnant	Leutnant
	Général	Commandant du corps d'armée	Colonel divisionnaire		Colonel	Lieutenant-colonel	Major	Capitaine	Premier-lieutenant	Lieutenant
	Generale	Comandante del corpo d'armata	Colonnello divisionario		Colonnello	Tenente colonnello	Maggiore	Capitano	Primo tenente	Tenente
(c. 1926)	General[1]	Corps General	Division General		Colonel	Lieutenant Colonel	Major	Captain	First Lieutenant	Lieutenant
	General	Oberstkorpskommandant	Oberstdivisionär		Oberst	Oberstleutnant	Major	Hauptmann	Oberleutnant	Leutnant
	Général	Colonel commandant de corps	Colonel divisionnaire		Colonel	Lieutenant-colonel	Major	Capitaine	Premier-lieutenant	Lieutenant
	Generale	Colonnello comandante di corpo	Colonnello divisionario		Colonnello	Tenente colonnello	Maggiore	Capitano	Primo tenente	Tenente
(c. 1941)	General[1]	Corps General	Division General	Brigade General	Colonel	Lieutenant Colonel	Major	Captain	First Lieutenant	Lieutenant
	General	Oberstkorpskommandant	Oberstdivisionär	Oberstbrigadier	Oberst	Oberstleutnant	Major	Hauptmann	Oberleutnant	Leutnant
	Général	Colonel commandant de corps	Colonel divisionnaire	Colonel brigadier	Colonel	Lieutenant-colonel	Major	Capitaine	Premier-lieutenant	Lieutenant
	Generale	Colonnello comandante di corpo	Colonnello divisionario	Colonnello brigadiere	Colonnello	Tenente colonnello	Maggiore	Capitano	Primo tenente	Tenente
(1974–1996)	General[1]	Corps General	Division General	Brigade General	Colonel	Lieutenant Colonel	Major	Captain	First Lieutenant	Lieutenant
(1997–present)	General[1]	Corps General	Division General	Brigade General	Colonel	Lieutenant Colonel	Major	Captain	First Lieutenant	Lieutenant
	General	Korpskommandant	Divisionär	Brigadier	Oberst	Oberstleutnant	Major	Hauptmann	Oberleutnant	Leutnant
	Général	Commandant de corps	Divisionnaire	Brigadier	Colonel	Lieutenant-colonel	Major	Capitaine	Premier-lieutenant	Lieutenant
	Generale	Comandante di corpo	Divisionario	Brigadiere	Colonnello	Tenente colonnello	Maggiore	Capitano	Primo tenente	Tenente

Enlisted

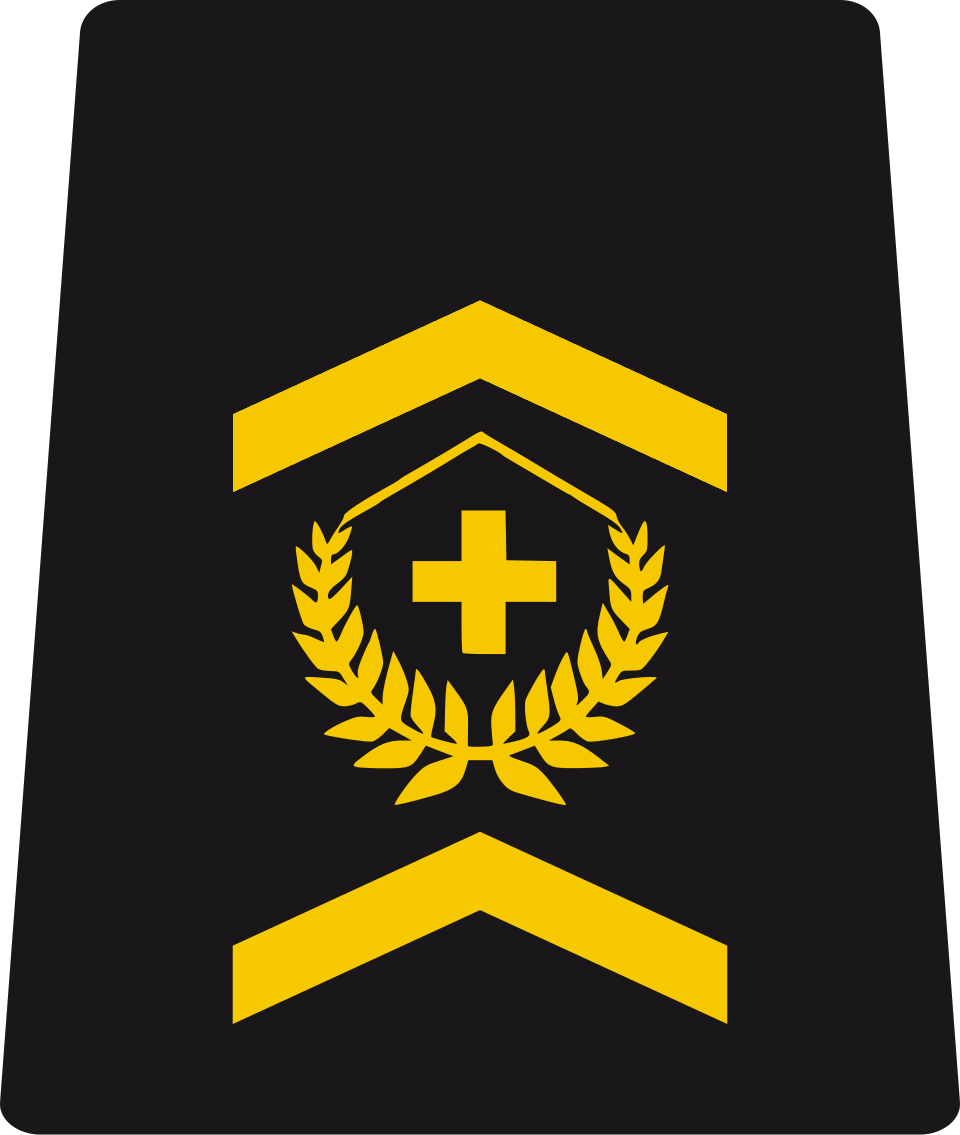
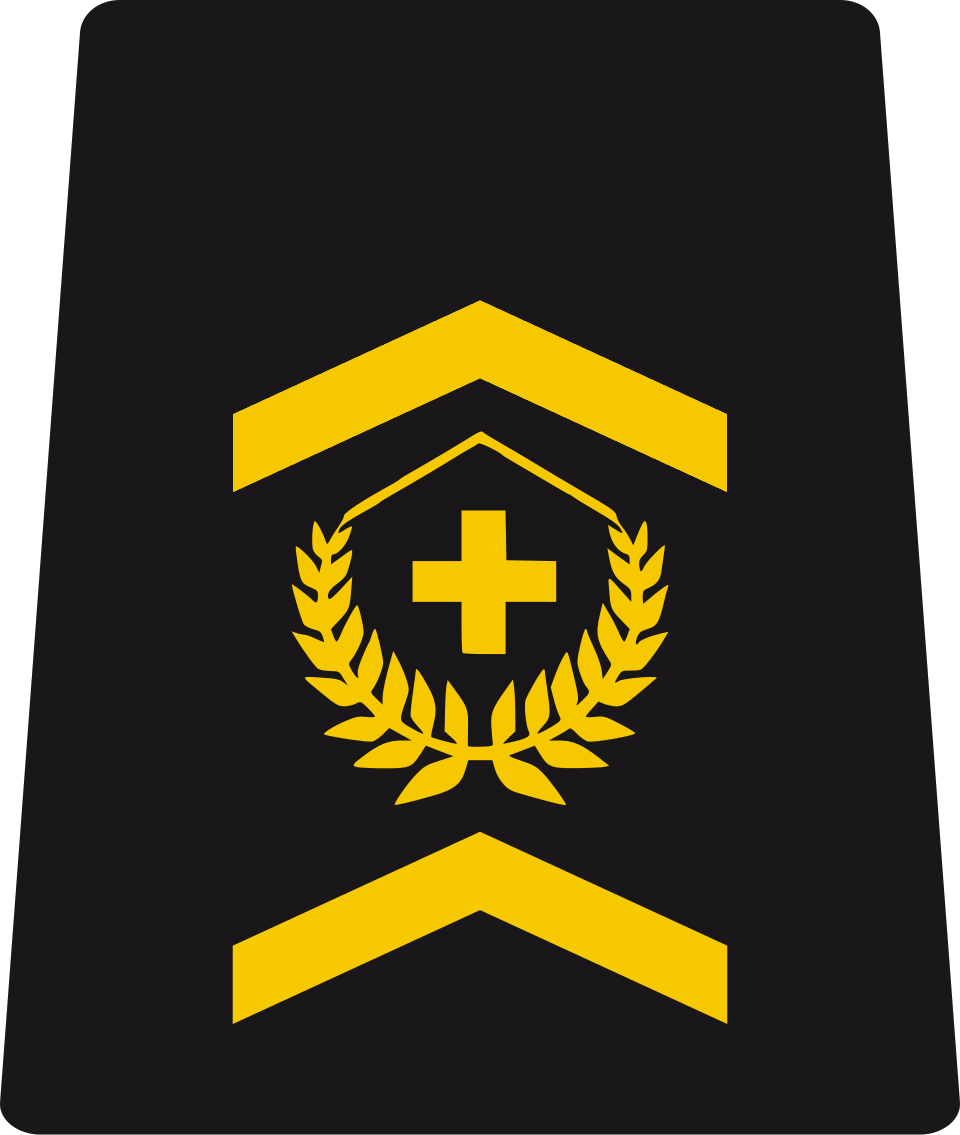
Rank group	Senior NCOs									Junior NCOs		Enlisted
(c. 1898)
(c. 1914)
(c. 1926)
(c. 1941)
(1974–1996)
				Adjutant unteroffizier			Feldweibel	Fourier	Wachtmeister	Korporal		Gefreiter	Soldat
				Adjudant sous-officier			Sergent-major	Fourrier	Sergent	Caporal		Appointé	Soldat
				Aiutante sottufficiale			Sergente maggiore	Furiere	Sergente	Caporale		Appuntato	Soldato
(1997–2008)
			Stabsadjutant	Adjutant unteroffizier			Feldweibel	Fourier	Wachtmeister	Korporal		Gefreiter	Soldat
			Adjudant d'état-major	Adjudant sous-officier			Sergent-major	Fourrier	Sergent	Caporal		Appointé	Soldat
			Aiutante di stato maggiore	Aiutante sottufficiale			Sergente maggiore	Furiere	Sergente	Caporale		Appuntato	Soldato
(2008–present)
(2008–present)	Chefadjutant	Hauptadjutant	Stabsadjutant	Adjutant unteroffizier	Hauptfeldweibel	Fourier	Feldweibel	Oberwachtmeister	Wachtmeister	Korporal	Obergefreiter	Gefreiter	Soldat
(2008–present)	Adjudant-chef	Adjudant-major	Adjudant d'état-major	Adjudant sous-officier	Sergent-major chef	Fourrier	Sergent-major	Sergent chef	Sergent	Caporal	Appointé-chef	Appointé	Soldat
(2008–present)	Aiutante capo	Aiutante maggiore	Aiutante di stato maggiore	Aiutante sottufficiale	Sergent-major capo	Furiere	Sergente maggiore	Sergent capo	Sergente	Caporale	Appuntato capo	Appuntato	Soldato
Rank group	Senior NCOs									Junior NCOs		Enlisted
