= List of former equipment of the Swiss Army =

== Swiss Army knives ==
The formerly issued models of the Swiss Armed Forces are:

- Modell 1890
  - Modell 1890 Ausführung 1901
- Modell 1908
- Modell 1951
  - Modell 1951 Ausführung 1954
  - Modell 1951 Ausführung 1957
- Modell 1961
  - Modell 1961 Ausführung 1965
  - Modell 1961 Ausführung 1978
  - Modell 1961 Ausführung 1994

=== Soldier knife model 1890 ===
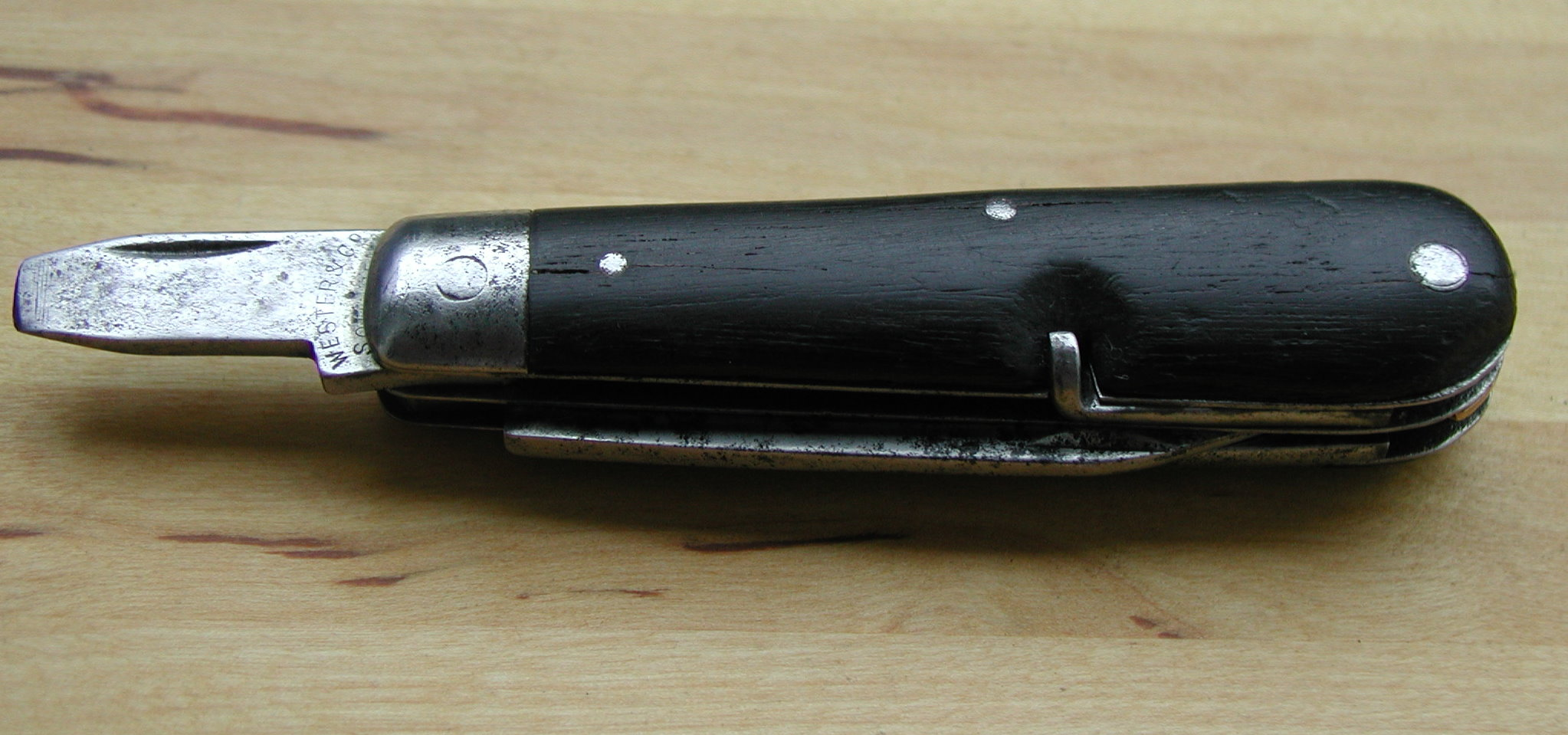
Modell 1890

The Soldier Knife model 1890 had a spear point blade, reamer, can-opener, screwdriver and grips made out of oak wood scales (handles) that were treated with rapeseed oil for greater toughness and water-repellency, which made them black in color.

The wooden grips of the Modell 1890 tended to crack and chip so in 1901 these were changed to a hard reddish-brown fiber similar in appearance to wood.

The knife was 100 mm (3.9 in) long, 20.5 mm (0.81 in) thick and weighed 144 g (5.1 oz).

=== Soldier knife model 1908 ===
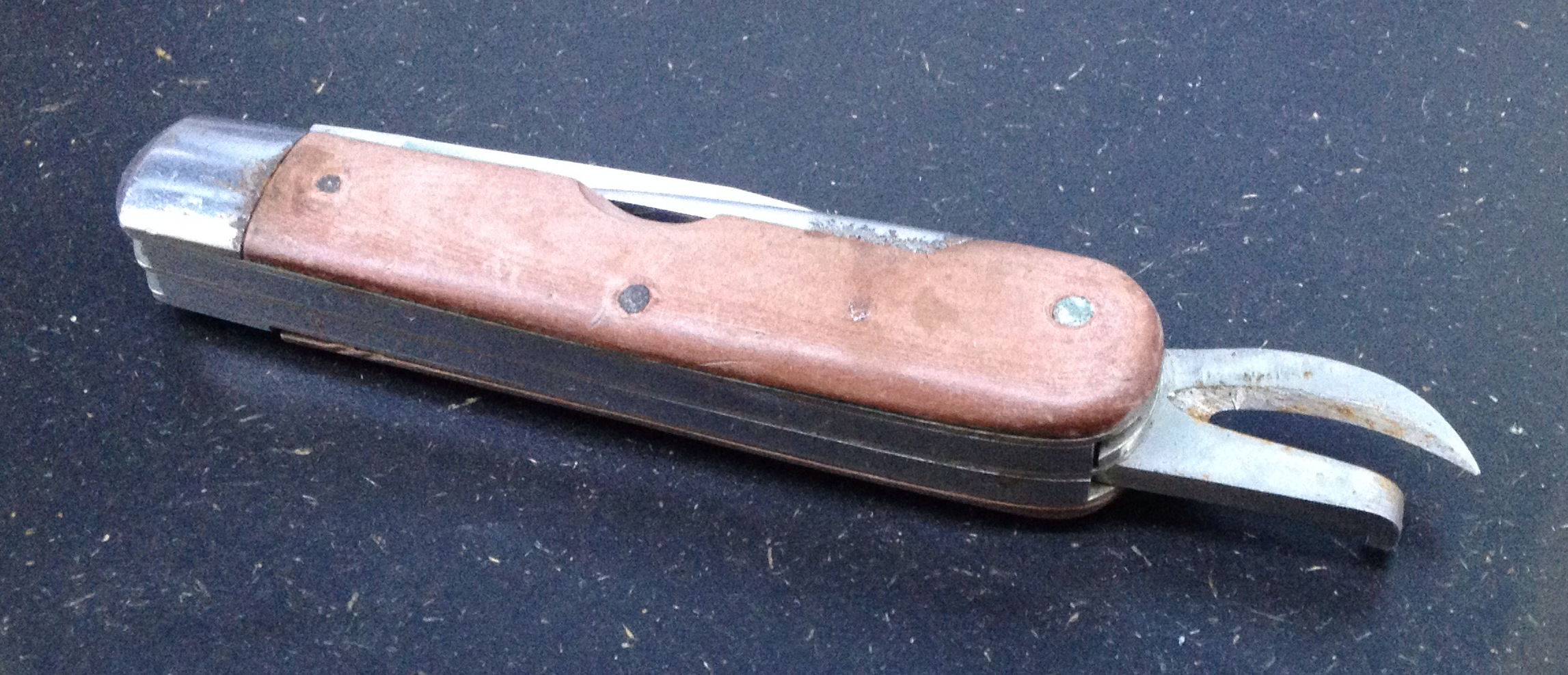
Modell 1908, issued from 1908 to 1951

The Soldier Knife model 1908 had a clip point blade rather than the 1890s spear point blade, still with the fiber scales, carbon steel tools, nickel-silver bolster, liners, and divider.

The knife was 100 mm (3.9 in) long, 16.5 mm (0.65 in) thick and weighed 125 g (4.4 oz). The contract with the Swiss Army split production equally between the Victorinox and Wenger companies.

=== Soldier knife model 1951 ===
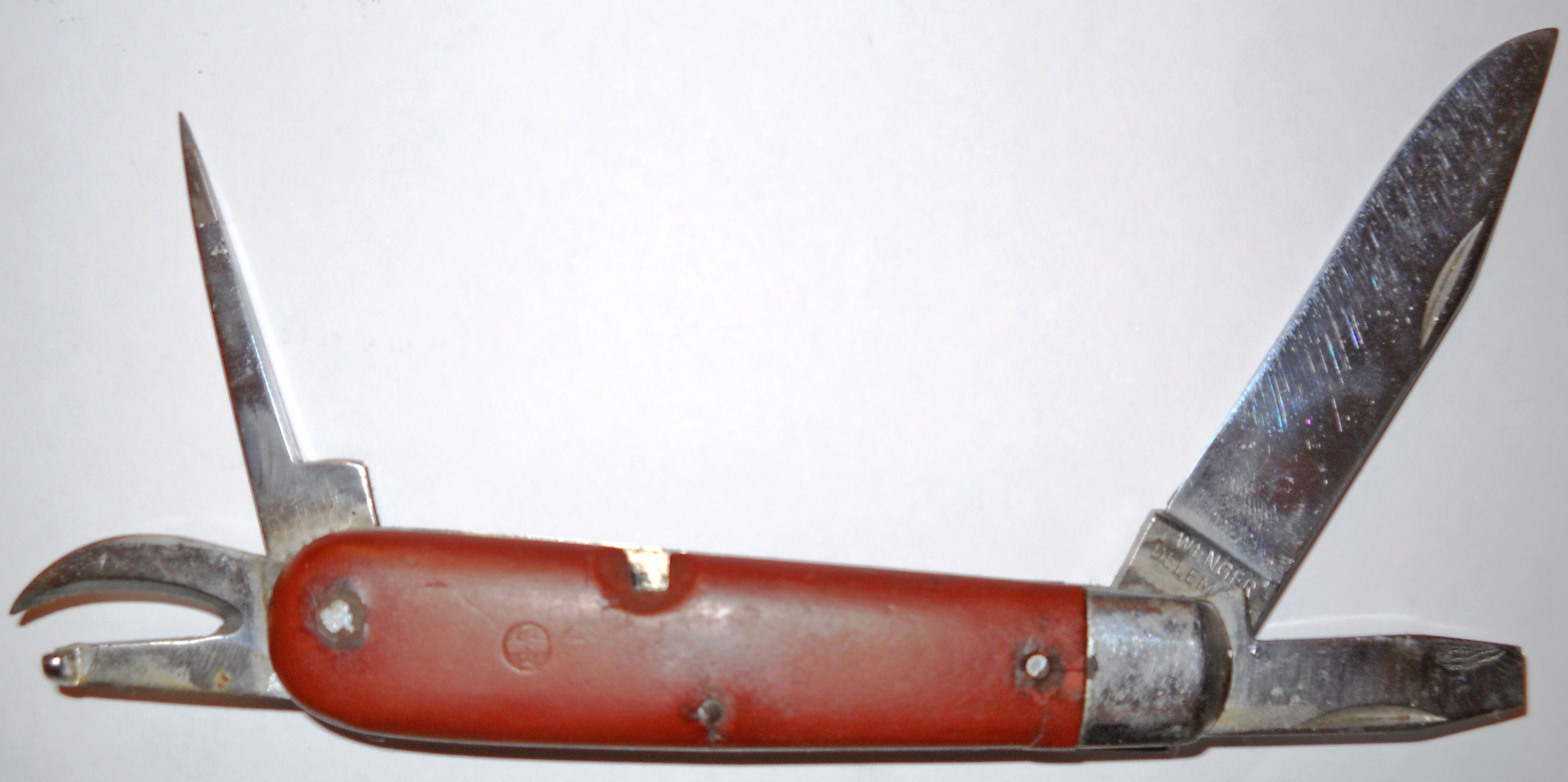
Modell 1951, issued from 1951 to 1961

The soldier Knife model 1951 had fiber scales, nickel-silver bolsters, liners, and divider, and a spear point blade.

This was the first Swiss Armed Forces issue model where the tools were made of stainless steel. The screwdriver now had a scraper arc on one edge. The knife was 93 mm (3.7 in) long, 13.5 mm (0.53 in) thick and weighed 90 g (3.2 oz).

=== Soldier knife model 1961 ===
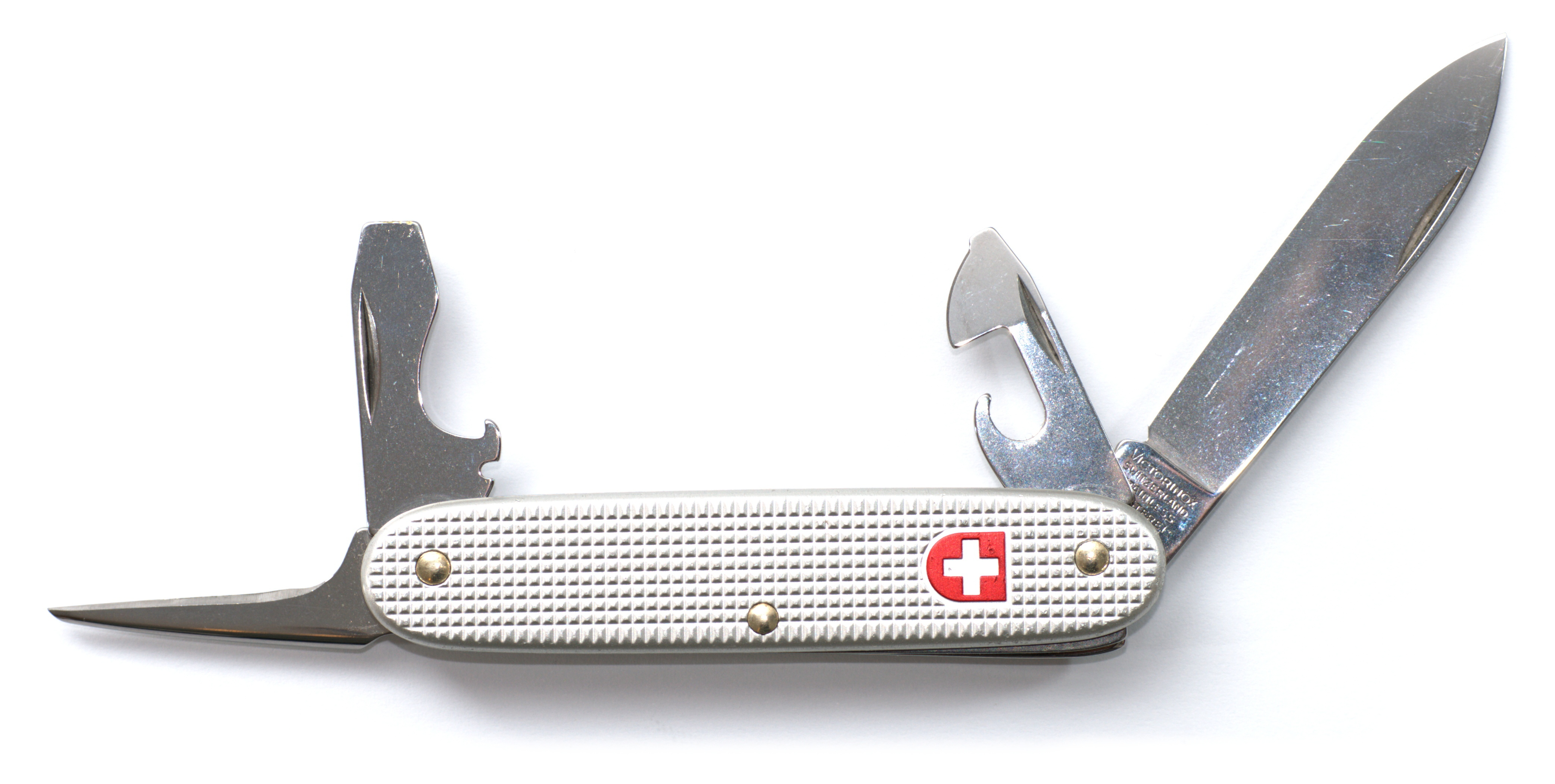
Modell 1961 Ausführung 1994, issued from 1994 to 2008

The Soldier Knife model 1961 has a 93 mm (3.7 in) long knurled alox handle with the Swiss crest, a drop point blade, a reamer, a blade combining bottle opener, screwdriver, and wire stripper, and a combined can-opener and small screwdriver. The knife was 12 mm (0.47 in) thick and weighed 72 g (2.5 oz)

The 1961 model also contains a brass spacer, which allows the knife, with the screwdriver and the reamer extended simultaneously, to be used to assemble the SIG 550 and SIG 510 assault rifles: the knife serves as a restraint to the firing pin during assembly of the lock.

The Soldier Knife model 1961 was manufactured only by Victorinox and Wenger and was the first issued knife bearing the Swiss Coat of Arms on the handle.

== Vehicles ==
Image	Name	Origin	Type	Variant	In service	Entered service	WFU	Notes
	Renault FT	France	Light tank	II	5	1921	1944	
	Vickers Carden Loyd M1931	United Kingdom	Tank	I, 33, 34, 35	8	1931	1948	
	Landsverk 60	Sweden	Tank	L-60	0	1936	?	Delegation sent to Sweden for evaluation but tank rejected.
	LTH (Panzerwagen 39)	Czechoslovakia	Tank	LTL-H	24	1939	1950	
	Renault R35	France	Light tank		12	1940	?	Test
	Nahkampfkanone 1	Switzerland	Tankhunter		1	1944	1947	Test
	Nahkampfkanone 2 Gustav	Switzerland	Tankhunter		1	1946	1947	Test
	Ram tank	Canada	Tank	RAM Mk.II	1 import France	1947	1959	Test/ training
	M4 Sherman	United States	Tank	Sherman M4A4	1 import France	1947	1959	Test/ training
	Panzerjäger G 13	Czechoslovakia	Tankhunter	G13	158	1947	1973	
	AMX-13	France	Light tank		200	1954	1980	
	M47 Patton	United States	Medium tank	M Pz M47	2	1952	1954	Test
	Panzer 55 Centurion	United Kingdom	Main battle tank	PZ55 Mk3	100	1955	1991	
	Panzer 55 Centurion	United Kingdom	Tank	Pz55 Mk5	100	1955	1991	From South Africa.
	Panzer 55 Centurion	United Kingdom	Tank	Pz57 Mk7	100	1957	1991	
	Panzer 55 Centurion	United Kingdom	Tank	Pz67 Mk12	12	1975	1991	From Canada.
	Entpannungspanzer 56	United Kingdom	Recovery tank	Entp Pz 56	30	1956	1991	19 where sold to Sweden in 1991.
	Brückenpanzer 55 Centurion	United Kingdom	Armoured bridgelayer	Brü Pz	2	1963	1966	Test
	Panzer 58	Switzerland	Medium tank	MPz 58	12	1958	1964	
	Panzer 61	Switzerland	Medium tank	Pz61	150	1964	1994	
	Panzer 68	Switzerland	Tank	Pz68 1Serie	170	1971	1999	All upgraded to AA3.
	Panzer 68	Switzerland	Tank	Pz68AA2	50	1974	2003	All upgraded to AA3.
	Panzer 68	Switzerland	Tank	Pz68/75	170	1978	2003	All upgraded to AA3.
	Panzer 68	Switzerland	Tank	Pz68 AA5	220	1988	1999	All upgraded to AA3.
	Panzer 68	Switzerland	Tank	Pz68/88	195	1993	2003	All upgraded to AA3.
	Entpannungspanzer 65	Switzerland	Recovery	Entp Pz65	69	1970	2008	
	Brückenpanzer 68	Switzerland	Bridgelayer	Brü Pz68	30	1974	2005	
	Panzerkanone 68	Switzerland	Self propelled howitzer	Pz Kan 68	4	1972	1975	Test
	Fliegerabwehrpanzer 68	Switzerland	Self-propelled anti-aircraft gun	B22L	2	1979	1980	Test
	Zielfahrzeug 68	Switzerland	Training target		10	1974	2007	
	Mowag Shark	Switzerland	Misc		3	1981	1981	Test:APC, Tank, AAA, Anti Tank
	Mowag PiranhaIIIC 10x10	Switzerland	Misc	IIC 10x10	1	1994	1994	Test
	Leopard 2 Driving trainer	West Germany	Trainer		3	1988	2002	
	Universal Carrier	United Kingdom	Was in use					
	MOWAG Scorpion	Switzerland	Tested					
	Mowag Pirat	Switzerland	Test, lost against M113.					
	Saurer Tartaruga	Switzerland	Test, lost against M113.					
	Mowag armored dummy	Switzerland	Was in use					
	Mowag Puma	Switzerland	Tested					
	Mowag Shark	Switzerland	Tested					
	Mowag Piranha 10x10	Switzerland	Tested					
	Mowag Trojan	Switzerland	After delay of order production cancelled.					
