= Air Defense Anti-Tank System =

Self-propelled anti-aircraft and -tank missile system

ADATS
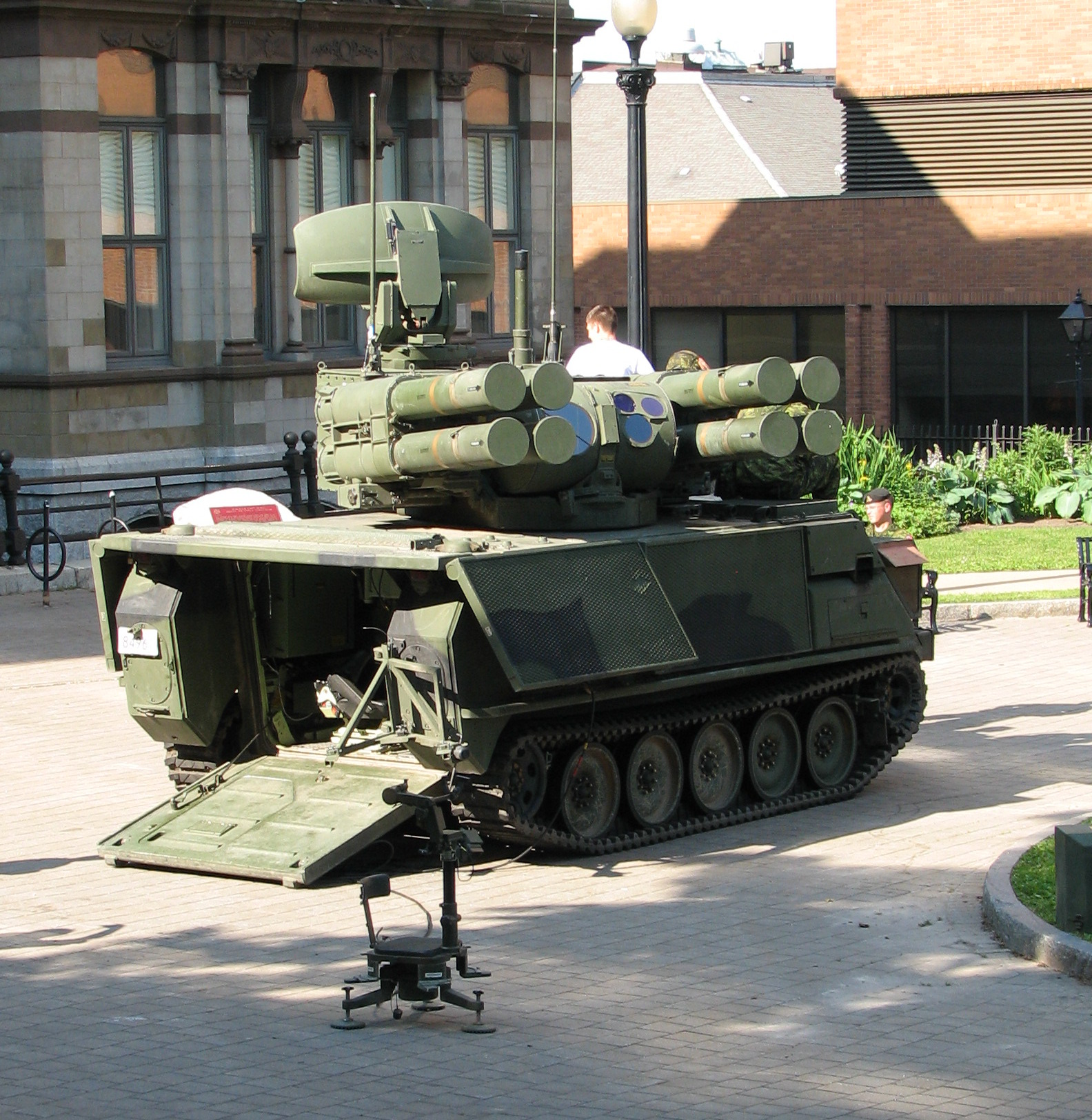
- ADATS on display for the 2008 Royal Nova Scotia International Tattoo
- Type: Self-propelled anti-aircraft and anti-tank missile system
- Place of origin: Switzerland / United States

Service history
- In service: 1989–2012
- Used by: Canada; Thailand

Production history
- No. built: Canada: 36; Thailand: 4; USA: 2

Specifications
- Mass: 15.8 tonnes
- Length: 4.86 m
- Width: 2.69 m
- Crew: 3 (commander, driver, system operator)
- Armor: 12–38 mm aluminium
- Main armament: 8 ADATS missiles
- Secondary armament: M242 Bushmaster 25 mm cannon (US evaluation version only)
- Engine: 6-cylinder two-stroke diesel General Motors/Detroit Diesel 6V53; 212 hp (158 kW)
- Power/weight: 13 hp/tonne
- Suspension: torsion-bar
- Operational range: 400 km
- Maximum speed: 58 km/h (36 mph)

The Air Defense Anti-Tank System (US designation MIM-146 ADATS) by Oerlikon/Martin Marietta is a dual-purpose short range surface-to-air and anti-tank missile system based on the M113A2 vehicle. The ADATS missile is a laser-guided supersonic missile with a range of 10 kilometres (6.2 miles), with an electro-optical sensor with TV and forward looking infrared (FLIR). The carrying vehicle also has a search radar with an effective range of over 25 kilometres (16 miles).

The first firing of an ADATS missile occurred in June 1981. Canada was the launch customer for the system with 36 units on the M113 chassis ordered for the Canadian Army in 1986. The system was further developed and produced at a new facility in Québec. The US Army also selected ADATS installed on the M3 Bradley chassis but by the time it was ready for service the ending of the Cold War led the US Army to cancel its orders, after Oerlikon invested over CHF 1 billion in the project. A small number of vehicles, many of them the developmental prototypes, entered service with the Canadian Army.

== History ==
The ADATS was trialled or proposed on a variety of different platforms to suit the needs of the user for the defence of mobile field formations or fixed sites such as airfields. Besides the M113A2 tracked vehicle chosen by Canada, the ADATS was also installed on the M3 Bradley chassis for the US Army and the Swiss MOWAG Shark 8x8 vehicle, and proposed for the British Warrior MICV chassis. A shelter-mounted version either with on-mount radar for autonomous use, or without radar for coordination with a central fire control centre could be mounted on a 4x4 or 6x6 military truck or installed in fixed locations. This version was purchased by Thailand. A version mounted on the four-wheel trailer used for the Oerlikon Contraves Skyguard fire control system and without radar, probably intended for integration with Skyguard and Oerlikon GDF 35 mm guns, was also proposed.

There was also a proposed naval version called "Sea Sprint", using the standard eight-missile turret without the radar, proposed for the close-in anti-air and anti-missile self-defence role.

Oerlikon also suggested a dedicated anti-tank system without the radar, including a version mounted on a long articulating arm that could be elevated high above the vehicle to clear trees or terrain while the launch vehicle remained hidden.

=== Canada ===
The ADATS entered service with the Canadian Army (in 1989) as a mobile, M113-based system.

The first systems were deployed as part of Canada's NATO contribution in West-Germany. Thirty-six systems were delivered by 1994. The cost of the system was initially $650 million. Over the life of the project, total cost reached $1.1 billion.

After their return from Germany, Canadian ADATS systems were only operationally deployed once: In June 2002, they were used to defend the airspace of the G8 summit held in Kananaskis, Alberta. Canadian ADATS were never operationally deployed in Bosnia or Afghanistan. As of 31 March 2011, the ADATS has been withdrawn from Canadian service with no planned replacement announced.

Canadian acquisition of the ADATS system was marred by a scandal relating to the purchase of the land where assembly of the system was to take place. The property had been bought and sold several times over a short period of time and its price inflated before it was sold to Oerlikon. It led to the resignation of Minister of State for Transport André Bissonnette who had been directly involved in the land deal, and several criminal accusations.

=== US Army evaluation ===
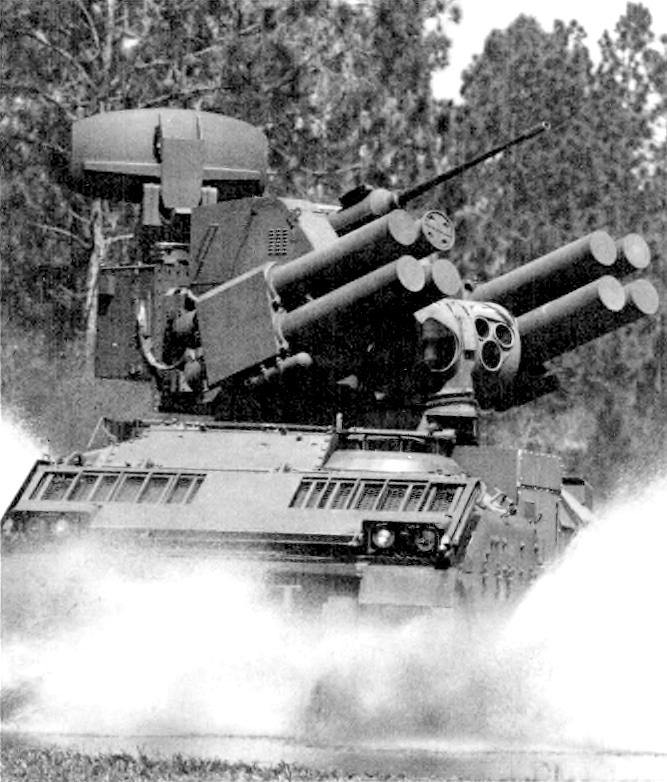
Evaluation in 1987 on an XM1069 (a derivative of the M3A2 Bradley) chassis, with a 25 mm autocannon

The ADATS cropped up from an extensive competition during which it was selected by the U.S. Army for the forward area air-defense (FAAD) programme under the designation MIM-146 for the missile. The US Army planned to purchase 387 systems. Test results indicated that the system did not perform well in inclement weather. Ultimately the FAAD contract was cancelled in the early 1990s after the end of the Cold War.

=== Thailand ===
The Royal Thai Air Force acquired one static shelter-based system from Oerlikon Canada, linked to a Skyguard fire control system.

=== Greece ===
In the late 1990s, Canada offered their surplus ADATS systems to the Greek military as part of a low-level air defense program. The offer was considered but not accepted. Greece eventually purchased the Russian Tor missile system.

=== Modernization programme ===
In September 2005, the Canadian government and the Canadian Forces announced a modernization program, transforming the ADATS and associated command, control and communications systems into a multi-mission effects vehicle (MMEV). The MMEV was to retain and enhance ADATS anti-aircraft and anti-armor capability (85% or better engagement success rate) to meet new threats, provide indirect fire support to ground troops, and would be mounted on an LAV III wheeled armoured vehicle.

Concept art of a multi-mission effects vehicle

It was to be fitted with a 3D radar, non-line-of-sight missile (using unmanned aerial vehicles (UAVs) to gather required intelligence and target location at a range of 8 km or more) and low-cost precision kill (LCPK) missile (fireable on direct shot at a >8 km range), based on a 2.75-inch rocket and advanced battle management command and control communication computer and information (BMC41), including link 11/16, to provide intelligence, surveillance, target acquisition, and reconnaissance (ISTAR). In July 2006, Canadian Forces land staff recommended the cancellation of the MMEV project. The program was cancelled in November 2006.

The ADATS was withdrawn from Canadian service in 2012.

== Missile specifications ==
- Length: 2.05 m
- Diameter: 152 mm
- Launch weight: approx. 51 kg
- Speed: > Mach 3
- Range: 10 km
- Ceiling: 7,000 m
- Warhead: 12.5 kg high explosive (HE) fragmentation/shaped charge, impact and proximity fuze
- Penetration: 900 mm rolled homogeneous armour (RHA)
- Guidance: Digitally coded laser beam-riding

== See also ==
- Tor missile system
- RIM-174 Standard ERAM
