= Panzer 2000 =

- Type: Main battle tank
- Place of origin: Switzerland

Service history
- Used by: Switzerland (intended)

Production history
- Designed: 1980s
- Manufacturer: Eidgenössische Konstruktionswerkstätte
- No. built: None (project cancelled)

The Panzer 2000 was a Swiss tank planned to replace the Panzer 68, produced by Eidgenoessische Konstruktionswerkstaette. It was intended for use by the Swiss Armed Forces.

== Description ==
The Panzer 2000 was based on the Panzer 68, but was totally redesigned over the course of the project. In addition to a new engine from Mercedes-Benz, the chassis would have included fewer, larger wheels than the Panzer 68. The main armament was a 120mm smooth-bore gun. In addition to the usual armor of the time, the Panzer 2000 would have been equipped with bolted-on armor plates. The same system had already been tested on a Panzer 68 as a cost-effective protection against hollow charge projectiles. Further improvements included the addition of modern thermal sights and electronics, and a new turret with greatly improved CBRN protection.

== History ==
The Panzer 2000 was intended to replace and eliminate the Panzer 68's shortcomings. However, the volatile history of its predecessor was an obstacle to the Panzer 2000's production. The Swiss doubted that Switzerland would be able to produce a well-functioning tank without expensive rework, and political parties used this argument; given the more modern technology, per-unit costs were to be much higher than the Panzer 68.

These high development costs, along with a lack of export orders, ultimately prevented production of the Panzer 2000. Instead, the German Leopard 2 was procured and introduced under the name Panzer 87. This procurement was quicker and cheaper than the Panzer 2000 program because of the Leopard's already high scale of production.

== Versions ==
In addition to the basic version as a main battle tank for the Swiss Army, the Panzer 2000 would have been converted into variants such as recovery tanks, combat engineering vehicle, driver trainers and the armoured vehicle-launched bridge. Also intended for export were variants as self-propelled artillery, anti-aircraft tanks, and ammunition tugs.
