= Brückenpanzer 68 =

Swiss armoured bridge layer

Brückenpanzer 68 (Brü Pz68) Brückenpanzer 68/88
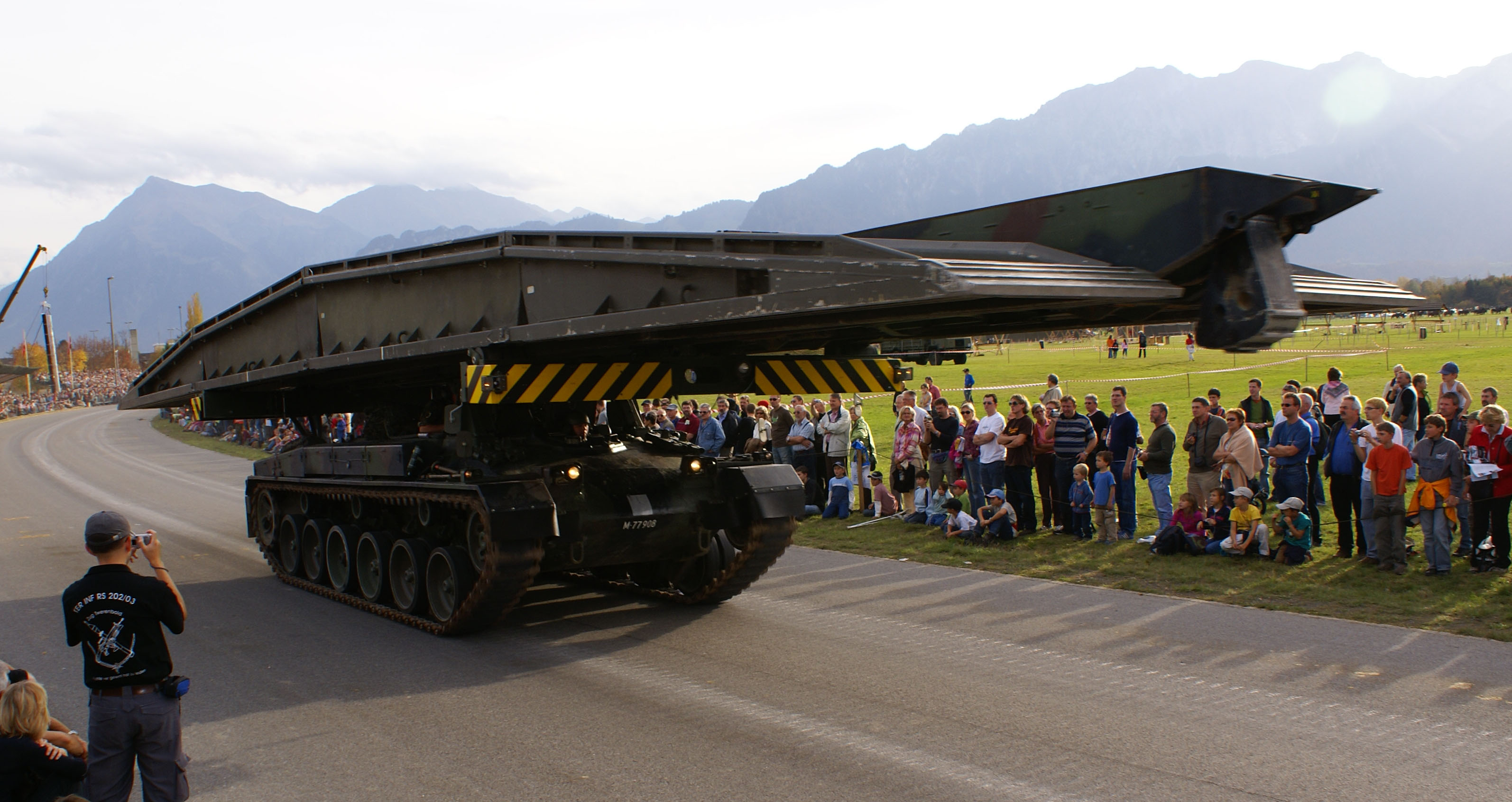
- Brückenpanzer 68
- Place of origin: Switzerland

Service history
- In service: 1972 - 2011
- Used by: Switzerland

Production history
- Designed: 1967
- Manufacturer: Eidgenössische Konstruktionswerkstätte Thun
- Produced: 1974 - 1977
- No. built: 30
- Variants: Bru Pz68; Bru PZ 68/88

Specifications
- Mass: 44,600 kg (47,000 kg bridge Pz68/88)
- Length: 19.96 m (65 ft 6 in) with bridge
- Width: 4.10 m (13 ft 5 in)
- Height: 3.88 m (12 ft 9 in)
- Crew: 3
- Armour: 80 mm maximum
- Main armament: None
- Secondary armament: 8x Nbw 51 8 cm (Bru Nbw Pz 68/88 8 x 7.6 87)
- Engine: 8 cylinder V90 ° engine four stroke MTU MB 837 Ba-500 auxiliary motor 4 cylinder engine Mercedes Benz OM 636; 660 hp / 485, 4 kW at 2200 rpm
- Power/weight: 12.3 kW/T
- Transmission: SLM Driving and steering gear Clutch Transmission 6 forward 6 reverse gears
- Suspension: torsion bar
- Ground clearance: 370 mm
- Fuel capacity: 855 l
- Operational range: 300 km (190 mi), off-road 180 km (110 mi)
- Maximum speed: 55 km/h (34 mph)

The Brückenpanzer 68 (Bridge Tank 68) is an armoured vehicle-launched bridge manufactured by the Eidgenoessische Konstruktionswerkstaette, which was used by the Swiss Army. It is the bridge-laying version of the Panzer 68 tank.

== History ==
A prototype was built by modifying a Panzer 61 and was announced in 1967. In 1972 the Federal Council approved production of a version based on the Panzer 68. The Panzer 68 hull was unchanged, with the gun turret replaced by the bridge-laying mechanism. A total of 30 vehicles were manufactured between 1974 and 1977 and were assigned Swiss Military identification numbers (M codes) M77882 - M77911.

In 2005, 16 vehicles were taken out of service, the remaining vehicles were placed out of service in 2011. In 2012 a Brückenpanzer 68 was given at the Military Historical Foundation of the Canton Zug in Neuheim Neuheim ZG.

== Specifications ==
The bridge consists of two track carriers of aluminum alloy. Each track support consists of two end portions and two intermediate portions. It is not a scissors bridge, it is transported in its entire length. The storage beam is mounted between the two tracking beams, which is connected to a hydraulic ram. The laying of the bridge is carried out by the hydraulically operated bar with which the whole bridge is moved over the guide frame (support bar). For laying, the storage beam is first extended and placed with the tip on the ground (thus, no support shield is necessary). Then the bridge is moved along the storage beam. After laying down the bridge, the storage beam is detached and is retracted.

Further technical data

- Power to weight ratio: 14.79 hp / t
- Ground pressure: 12.80 kg / cm ²
- Chain Edition: 4430 mm
- Track width: 520 mm
- Track: Padded rubber hinge chain
- Usable bridge length: 18.20 m
- Grave-border capacity: 2.00 mm
- Fording: 1.10 mm
- Electrical system: 24 volt, 4 batteries, 6 volt 189 Ah, minus pole to ground
- Radio: SE 412 / A + C
- Engine: Bore: 165 mm : Stroke: 175 mm : Capacity: 29900 cm ³
- Fuel: Diesel

From 1989, all bridge tanks were converted to analog 68 Pz 68/88 on the Rüststand AA6.

- Pick-up device has been improved
- The vehicle has a camouflage (the bridge was not repainted)
- One of the two radios were removed
- Back on the arm of the bridge launcher mechanism was a radio antenna removed
