= Mowag Puma =

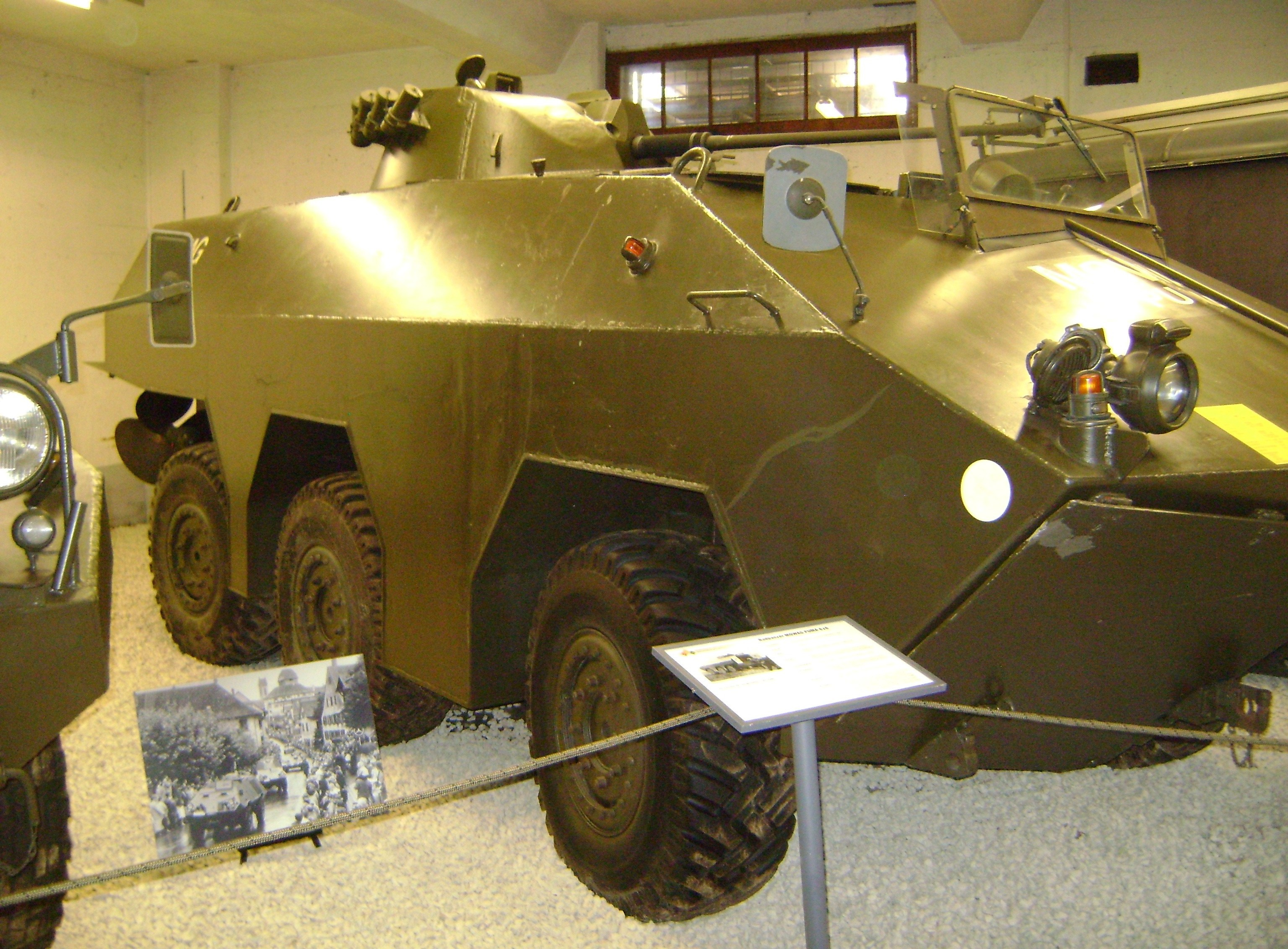
- Mowag Puma at Schweizerisches Militärmuseum Full
- Place of origin: Switzerland

Service history
- In service: never entered production

Production history
- Designer: MOWAG motor car factory Kreuzlingen
- Designed: 1981
- Manufacturer: Mowag
- No. built: 1

Specifications
- Crew: 7: driver, commander, gunner, 4 passengers in the rear area
- Main armament: Coaxial armament turret with 20mm machine gun, 7.62 mm MG3 HS
- Secondary armament: 2× 76mm sextuple smoke grenade launchers 9mm Uzi in spherical aperture
- Engine: 8 cylinder Mowag M8DV, 10.8 L displacement 235 kW
- Transmission: MOWAG M130-16S, 6 forward and 2 reverse
- Suspension: 6×6 wheeled
- Operational range: 400 km (250 mi)
- Maximum speed: 80 km/h (50 mph) on road 42 km/h (26 mph) off-road 12 km/h (7.5 mph) water

The Mowag Puma is an armored personnel carrier produced by Mowag in Switzerland.

== Design ==
Emphasized in the Puma vehicles were buoyancy, high payload, high maneuverability and ease of operation in nuclear/biological/chemical (NBC) contaminated areas.

The 6×6 Puma has steerable wheels on the first and the third axles, while the wheels of the middle axle are fixed, which enables a tight turning circle.

Behind the two rear wheels is a ship propeller. The motor is housed in the front.

Grenadiers leave the vehicle through a door behind the turret hatch in the roof or through a large double door at the rear of the vehicle.

== History ==
The Puma was the first of a family of vehicles including the 4×4, 6×6 and 8×8, which were designed and built in the 4×4 and 6×6 versions with different weight divisions.

The Puma yielded important results for the 8×8 armored personnel/weapon carrier Mowag Shark.

A prototype of the Puma, which took part in various trials in Switzerland and at presentations at the Gurnigel, Bruggrugg and Oerlikon-Bührle premises Ochsenboden, is now in the Schweizerisches Militärmuseum Full. The Puma never went into series production.
