= Panzer 68 =

Swiss main battle tank

Panzer 68-88
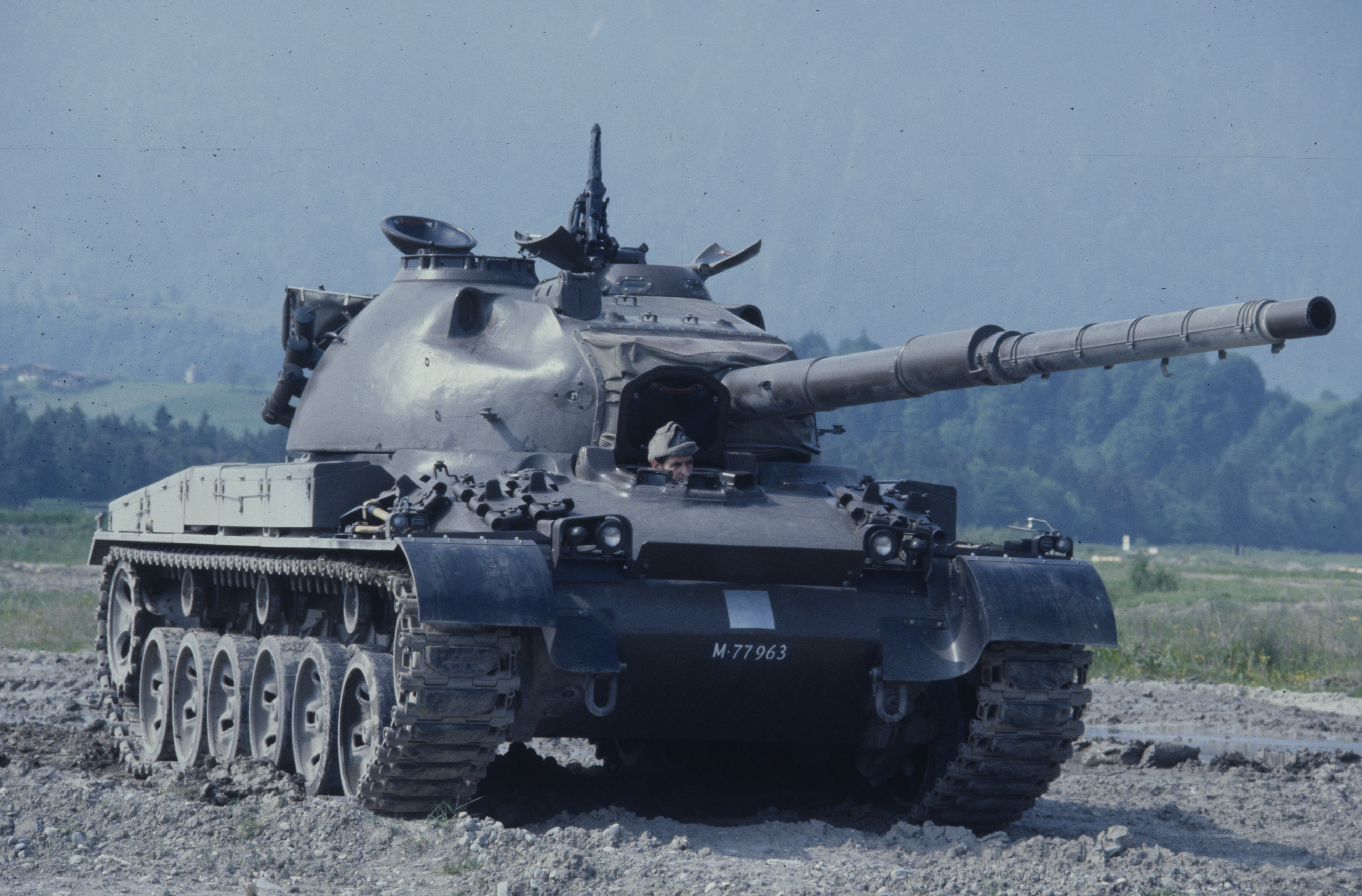
- Panzer 68 in service, 1991
- Type: Main battle tank
- Place of origin: Switzerland

Service history
- In service: 1971 – 2003
- Used by: Switzerland

Production history
- Designed: 1960s
- Manufacturer: Eidgenoessische Konstruktionswerkstaette
- Produced: 1971 – 1983
- No. built: 390 (all versions); 195 68/88; 1 Panzer 68-2000 (prototype)
- Variants: Panzer 68; Panzer 68/75; Panzer 68/88; Panzer 68-2000 (prototype)

Specifications
- Mass: 40.8 tonnes
- Length: 9.49 m (31 ft 2 in)
- Width: 3.14 m (10 ft 4 in)
- Height: 2.72 m (8 ft 11 in)
- Crew: 4
- Armour: up to 120 mm Rolled homogeneous armour
- Main armament: 105 mm Royal Ordnance L7 rifled gun with 52 rounds
- Secondary armament: 2× 7.5 mm Swiss Pz Mg 51/71 machine guns with 4000 rounds 6× smoke dischargers
- Engine: MTU MB 837 Ba-500 V-8 diesel engine 660 hp
- Power/weight: 16.2 hp/tonne
- Suspension: plate springs and hydraulic dampers
- Ground clearance: 400 mm
- Operational range: 200 km (120 mi)
- Maximum speed: 55 km/h (34 mph)

The Panzer 68 was a Swiss main battle tank developed by the Eidgenoessische Konstruktionswerkstaette in Thun in the late 1960s, and was the main tank of the Swiss Army until the late 1990s.

== History ==
The Panzer 68 was based on the Panzer 61, which initial development dates back to 1951. The development started immediately after the successful introduction of the Panzer 61. Improvements consisted of wider tracks, stabilized gun, and the introduction of a second machine gun instead of the coaxial 20mm gun of early Panzer 61 models.

In 1968 (hence the name) the Swiss parliament decided to buy 170 vehicles. Deliveries of the Panzer 68 started in 1971. In 1977 a second batch was manufactured. In the years between 1978 and 1983, a third and fourth batch followed. The last two lots were called either AA3 and AA4 or Panzer 68/75. The most important change was the introduction of a bigger turret.

The Austrian Army showed some interest in the Panzer 68 in the late 1970s, but decided not to buy the model when the deficiencies of the system became public. (see below)

In 1992 the Panzer 68 underwent one more modernization program which introduced a new fire control system which was on a par with the system used in the new Panzer 87 (license-built Leopard 2) This new, improved version was called Panzer 68/88. Despite the improvements in the Panzer 68/88, the model was relegated to secondary tasks after the arrival of the Panzer 87. All Panzer 68 models were retired in the early years of the new millennium. The responsible authorities tried to sell some 200 to the army of Thailand, but the deal never went through and therefore, the remaining vehicles were demilitarized and sold for scrap in 2005.

Some Panzer 68s can still be seen in military museums around the world.

== Technical problems ==
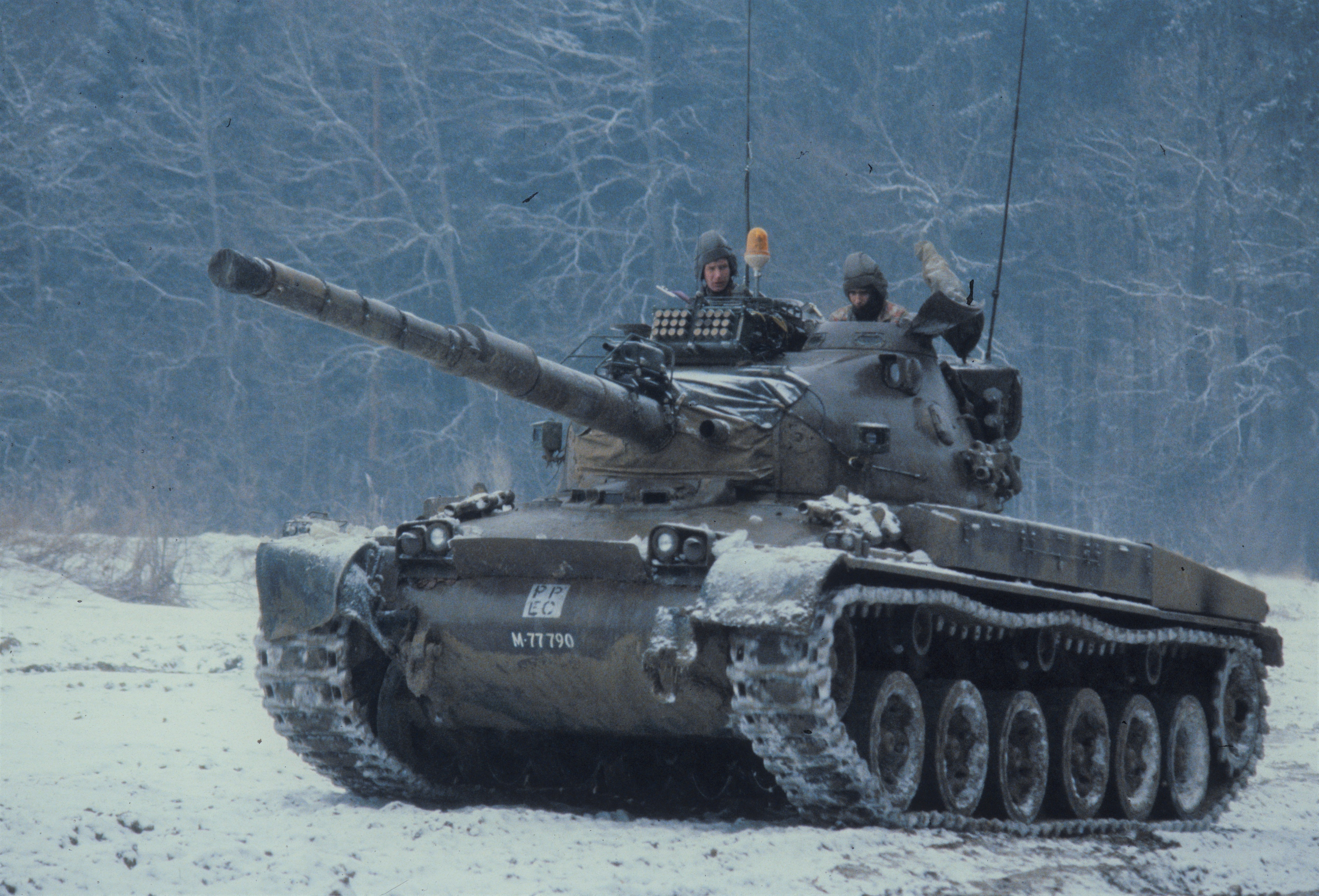
The Panzer 68 during exercise in 1981.

During the summer of 1979, the Weltwoche, a Swiss weekly, published an article regarding the shortcomings of the Panzer 68 that led to a scandal and, allegedly, to the resignation of the minister of defence, Rudolf Gnägi. In this article, the then chief of armoured forces of the Swiss Army came to the conclusion that the Panzer 68 was "not fit for combat". A group of experts that was commissioned to produce a report on the matter listed dozens of technical problems. Among others, the nuclear, biological and chemical (NBC) protection was found to be insufficient, forcing the crews to wear protective masks inside their tanks, thus greatly reducing the crews' performance. The experts also found that the gearbox did not allow for shifting into reverse while the vehicle was even slightly moving, forcing the crew to a full stop before reversing. To make things even worse, the radios used in the tank tended to interfere with the turret control system, resulting in uncontrolled turret movements whenever the radios were used at full power.

A year before the Weltwoche article, another very dangerous fault was found. Switching on the heating system could lead to the main gun firing the round in the gun. This problem was caused by some systems sharing the same electrical circuits. This problem never led to any accidents. In a sarcastic headline, Swiss tabloid Blick commented: "The Panzer 68 is much more dangerous than it seems!"

Most of the problems were resolved with the upgrade to the 68/88 model.

== Variants ==
- Panzer 68 1st Series (Pz68); 170 built 1971–1974, all upgraded to Pz68 AA 2 in 1975-1977
- Panzer 68 2nd Series (Pz68 AA 2); 50 built 1974-1977; one equipped with a new turret and updated as the Pz68/88
- Panzer 68 3rd Series (Pz68/75); also named Pz68GT (Grosser Turm ("Bigger Turret")); 110 built 1978–1979, all upgraded to Pz68/88 in 1993
- Panzer 68 4th Series (Pz68/75); 60 built 1983–1984, all upgraded to Pz68/88 in 1993
- Panzer 68/88; upgraded Pz68 AA 2 with modern laser guidance system (which was borrowed from the Pz 87 Leopard), an improved commander entry and updated camouflage pattern. Majority of aforementioned technical issues fixed.
- Panzer 68-2000 (Pz68-2000); project, fitted with 120mm Smoothbore gun, modern thermal sights and electronics, more powerful engine, new angular turret with highly improved NBC protection, additional protection. Rejected in favor of the Panzer 87 Leopard due to high developing costs.

== Derivative vehicles ==
Entpannungspanzer 65
Recovery Tank 65 - vehicle recovery variant.
Panzerartilleriekanone 68
Brückenpanzer 68
Bridge Tank 68 - bridge-laying variant, with single-piece span instead of more common scissors bridge, capable of spanning 18.2 metres (59 ft 9 in) gap; 30 produced between 1974 and 1977 and used until 2011
Fliegerabwehrpanzer 68
Anti-aircraft Tank 68 - variant fitted with Flakpanzer Gepard turret, mounting two Oerlikon 35mm anti-aircraft guns, on Panzer 68 hull widened by 180 millimetres (7 in); two tanks modified and tested in 1979-1980, not placed into production
Zielfahrzeug 68
Target Vehicle 68 - mobile target for training troops in the use of the M47 Dragon American-made anti-tank missile; modifications included the removal of the turret and its replacement with a dummy turret and gun, extra easily replaceable steel skirt plates protecting the tracks, and running gear changed to the tracks and wheels of the Panzer 61.

== Gallery ==
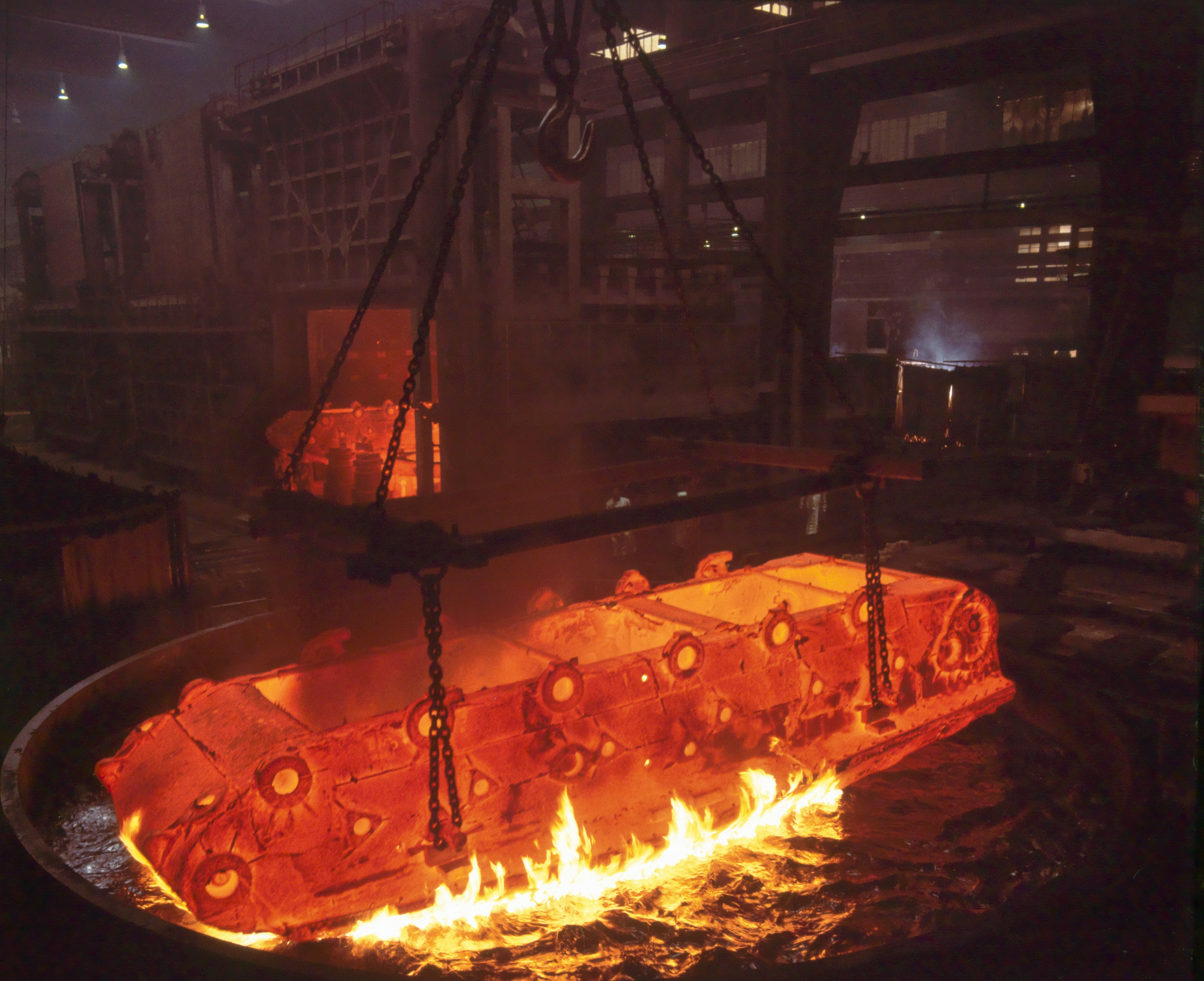
Panzer 68 hull undergoing heat treatment

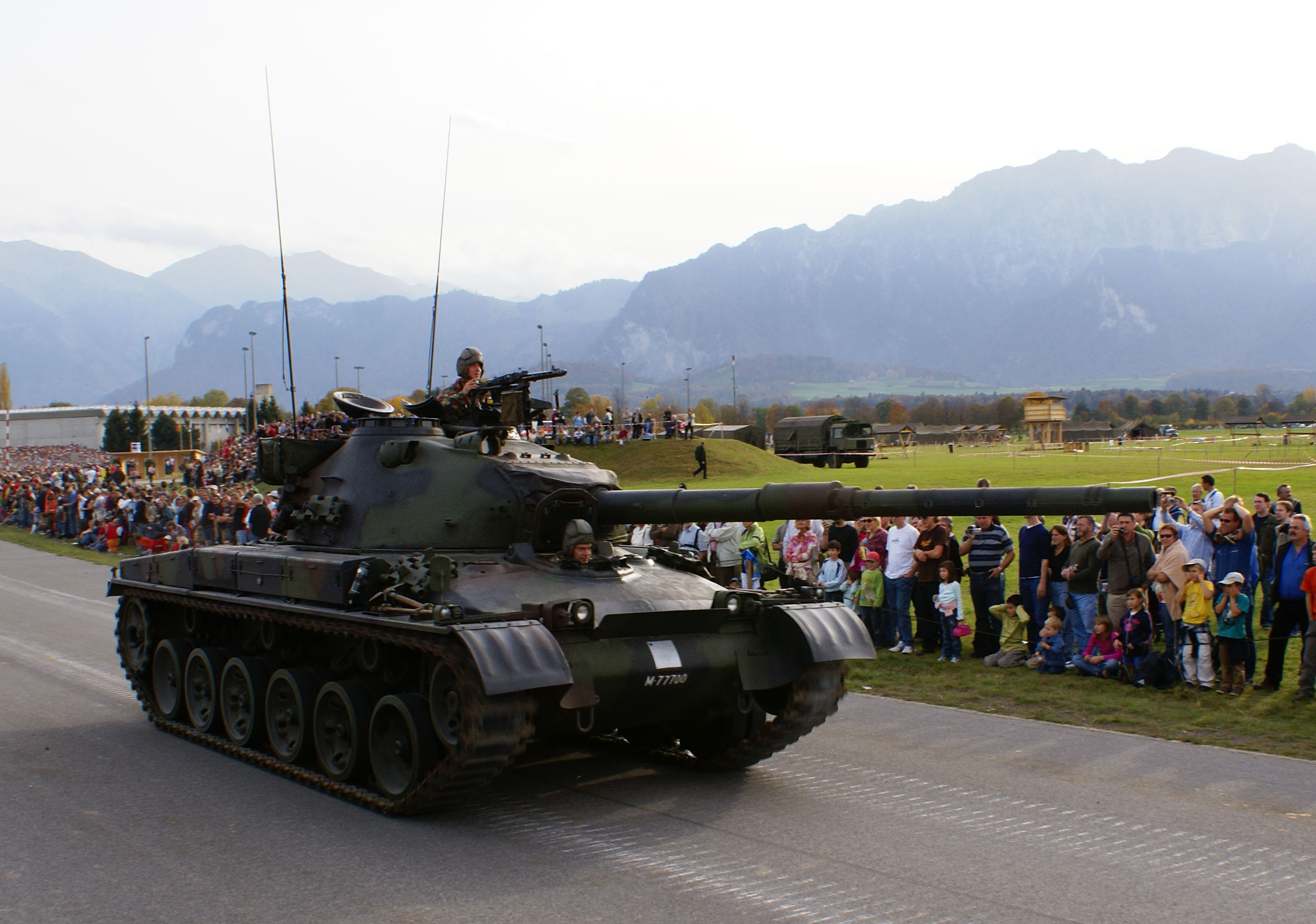
Panzer 68 during the 2006 Army Days

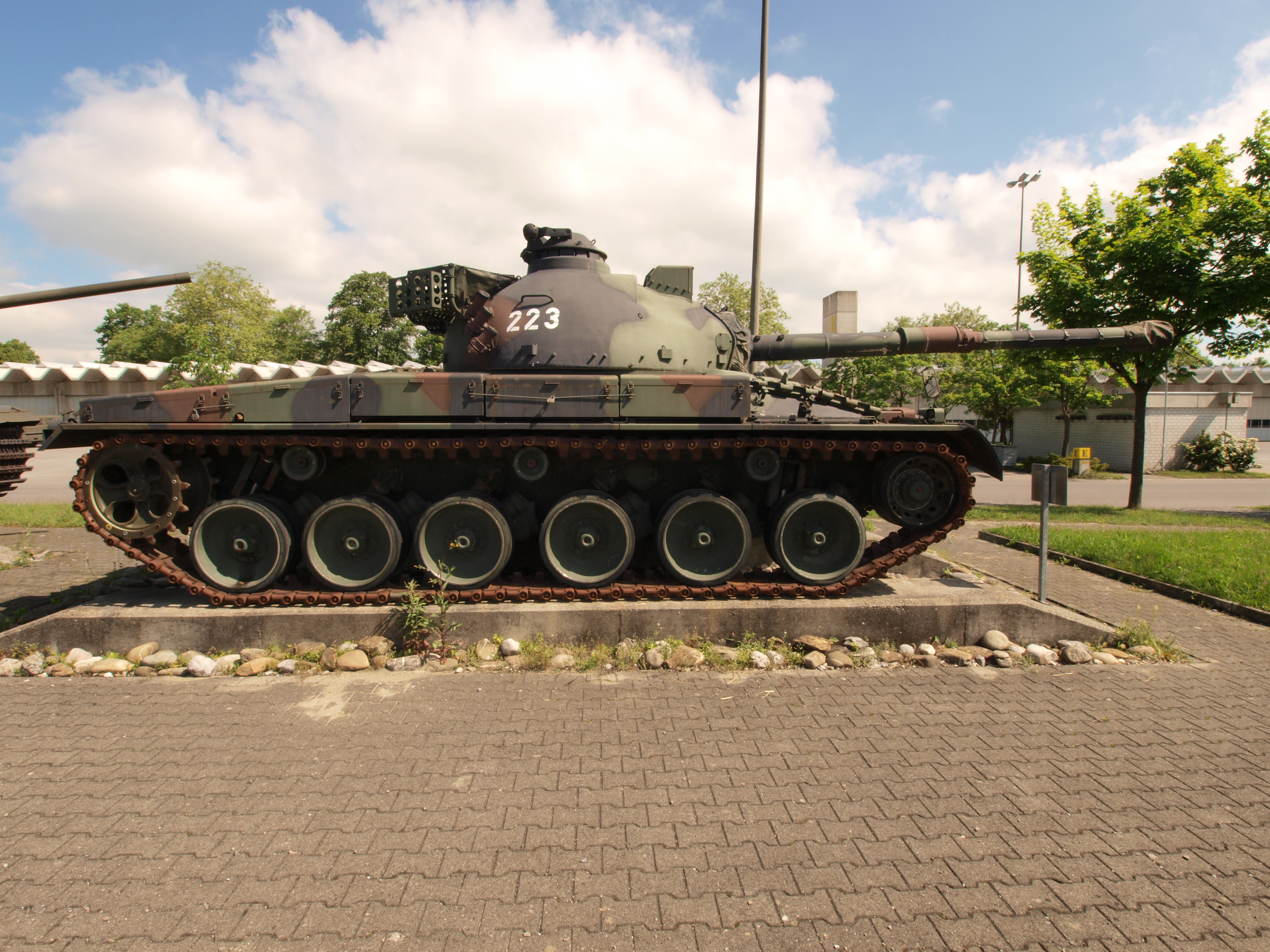
Panzer 68/88 in Thun

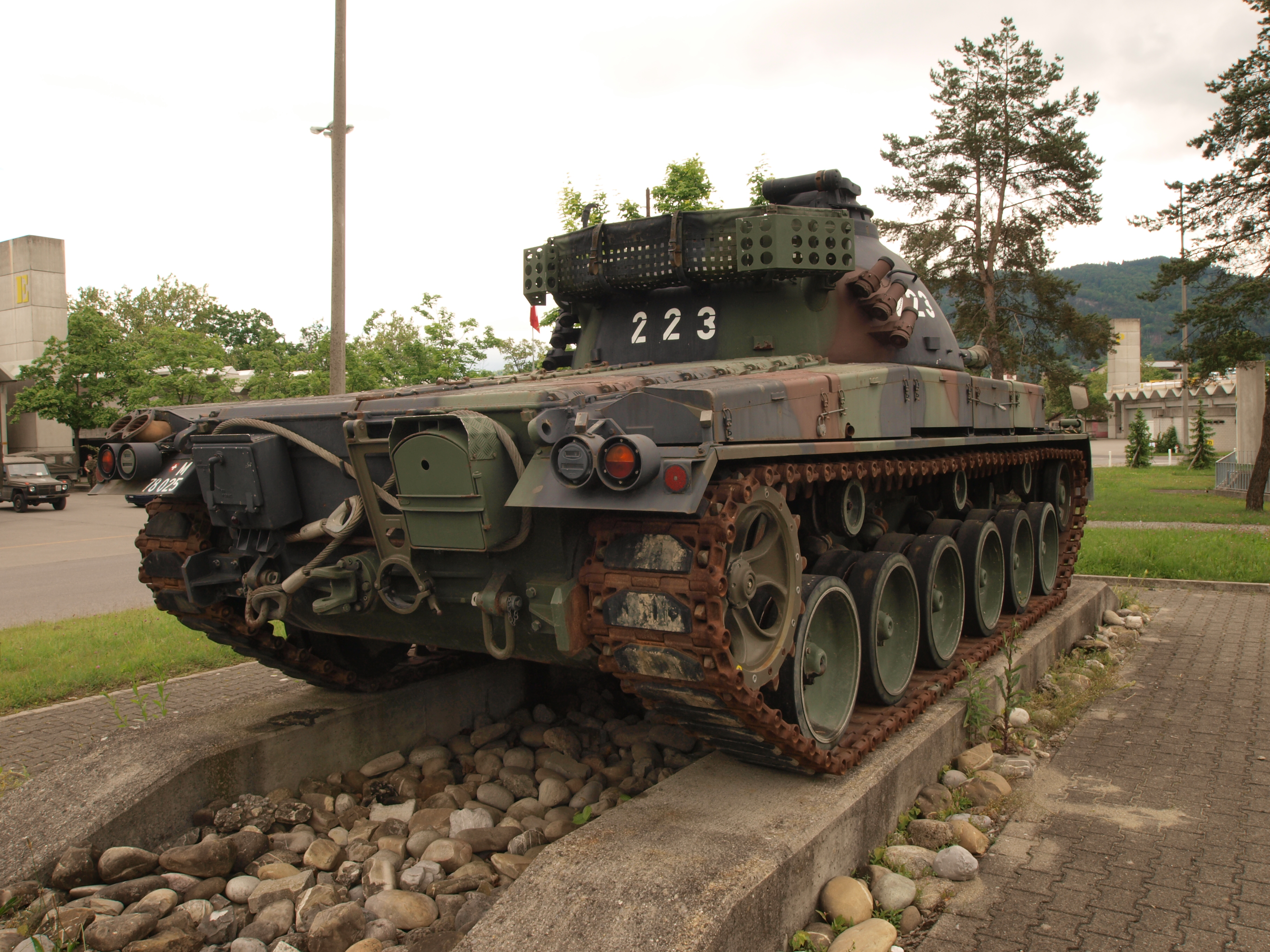
Panzer 68/88 in Thun

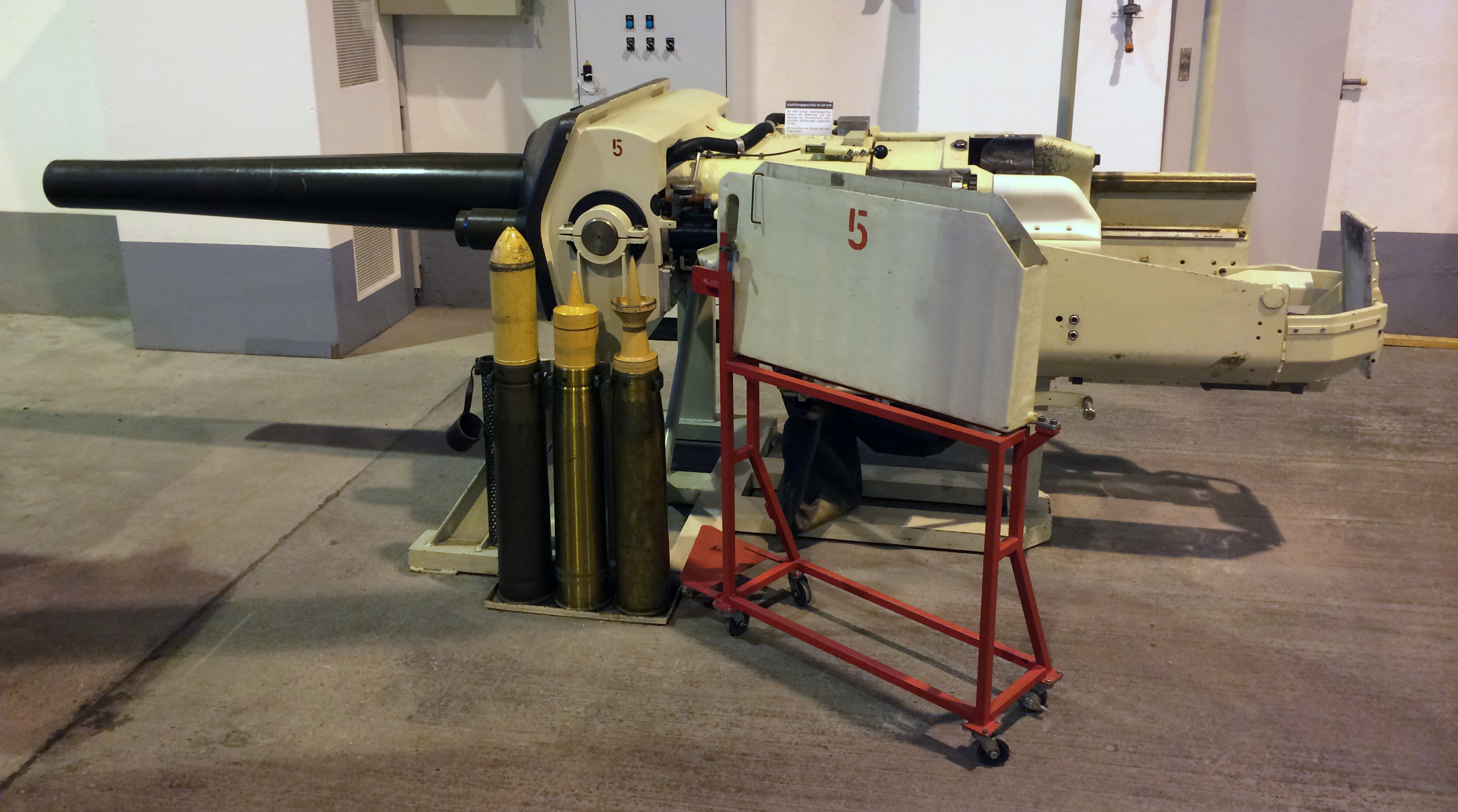
Training version of the Pz 68 main gun
