= Entpannungspanzer 65 =

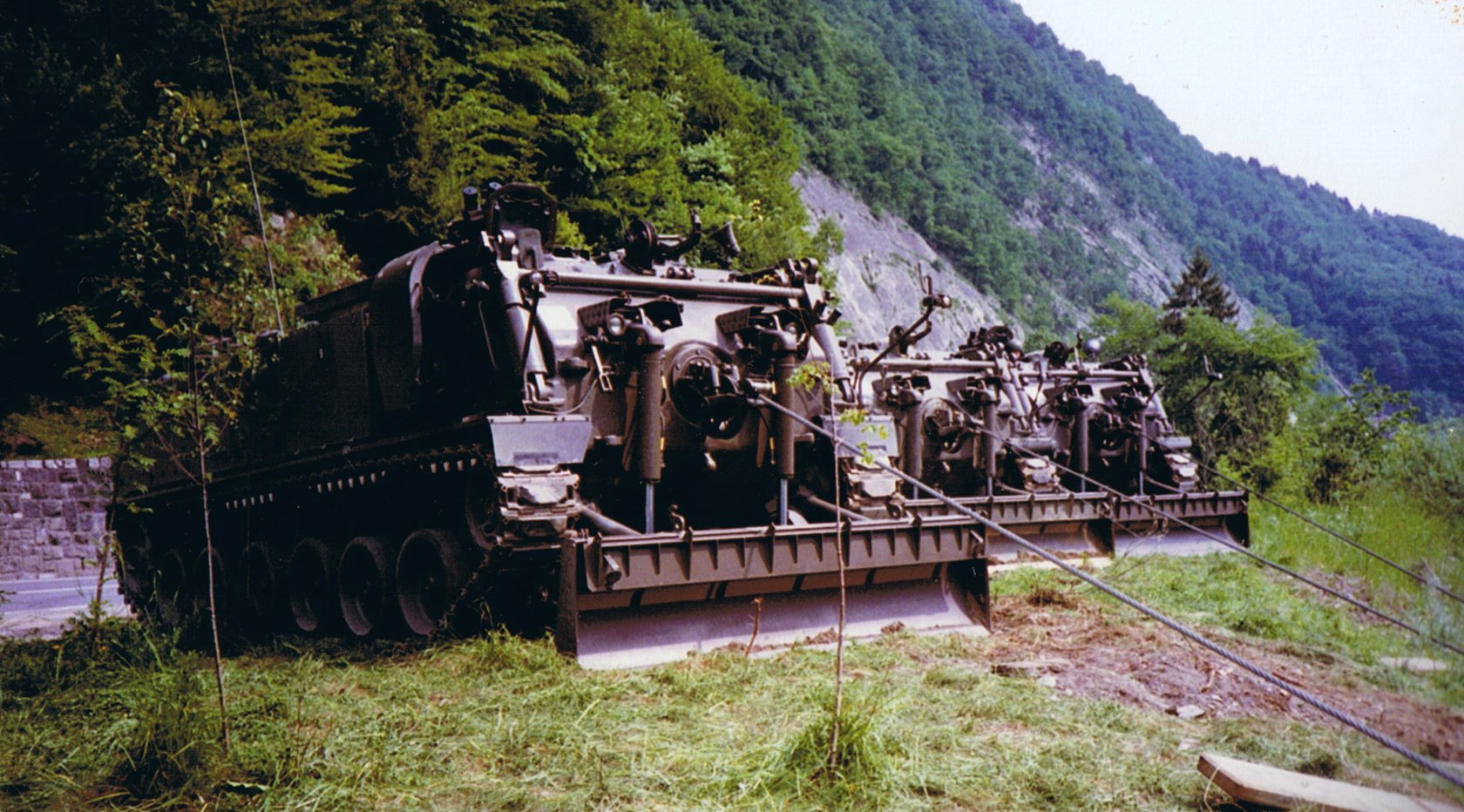
- Entpannungspanzer 65
- Type: Armored recovery vehicle
- Place of origin: Switzerland

Service history
- In service: 1970–2008
- Used by: Switzerland

Production history
- Designed: 1961
- Manufacturer: Eidgenössische Konstruktionswerkstätte Thun
- Produced: 1970–1972
- No. built: 69
- Variants: 65 /88

Specifications
- Mass: 39.0 tonnes
- Length: 7.60 m (299 in)
- Width: 3.15 m (124 in)
- Height: 2.79 m (110 in)
- Crew: 5
- Armour: up to 120 mm RHA
- Main armament: no
- Secondary armament: 1 Mg = 7.5 mm 51, 3000 shot, Nbw 6 × 51 8 cm, 12
- Engine: 8-cylinder V-90° engine four-stroke MTU MB 837 Ba-500 auxiliary motor four-cylinder engine Mercedes Benz OM 636; 660 hp, 38 hp
- Power/weight: 17 hp/tonne
- Suspension: torsion bar
- Operational range: 350 km (220 mi) (road)
- Maximum speed: 55.5 km/h (34.5 mph)

The Entpannungspanzer 65 (EntpPz 65) is a Swiss armored recovery vehicle developed by Eidgenoessische Konstruktionswerkstaette Thun in the late 1960s. The vehicle served as a traveling workshop for the Swiss military.

The prototype for the Entpannungspanzer 65 utilized the chassis system of another army vehicle called the Panzer 61. After successful testing, the government received approval for the production of sixty-nine (69) Entpanungspanzers.

== History ==
In 1961, the Federal Construction Workshop of Thun, Switzerland began development of a recovery vehicle based on the chassis of the Panzer 61 tank. The prototype was completed and approved after extensive testing with the chassis of the successor, (the only slightly modified) Panzer 68. With this form, the vehicle went into series production in 1970. The structure was reinforced with a box-shaped cabin. Numerous storage compartments were assembled on the sides to accommodate tooling, such as cutting torches. The motor and gear units were positioned in the rear of the vehicle, above the motor cover; and the series featured an open back with storage boxes to accommodate a spare engine.

The driver sat in the front right of the vehicle, surrounded by three angled mirrors. A rotating dome with multiple-angle mirrors was positioned behind the driver. There were four Nebelwerfers (Smoke Mortars) behind the driver. There was also a rotary coupling with a number of angle mirrors, and a hatch mounted on a pivot mount MG 51.

The entry and exit hatch was on the left side of the battle space above the height of the chain guide roller and the first roller. At the front of the vehicle is a hydraulically operated dozer blade attached crane-like and winch-like operations. It also was capable of removing obstacles, for preparing positions and the filling of trenches.

At the rear of the tank, a tow rope was attached on top of the sidepod tow bars (A-frame drawbar) attached. The vehicle had an NBC protection system. The maximum tensile load of the main winch was 25 tons, which could be increased with double deflection in the triple train to 75 tons. The cable length was 120 m. The auxiliary winch had 240 feet of rope length. The crane consists of an A-shaped frame, which is mounted on the front of the vehicle and stored when not in use in the rear of the structure. The corresponding winch was located behind the crew compartment. The crane at the time of its creation had a lifting capacity of 15 tons at a three-meter radius. The lift height was 4.8 m. The crew consisted of commander, driver, observer and two tank mechanics.

It entered service in 1972 with 69 vehicles for the Swiss Army. Between 1993 and 1995, all vehicles were updated to the status Entpannungspanzer 65/88 and remained with the M numbers M78631-M78699 until 2008 in the service of the Swiss Army.

The prototype with the M number M0870 is in the Thun Tank Museum and a serial version is in the Military Museum Full.

== Technical ==
The Entpannungspanzer 65 has a semi-automatic powershift transmission with six forward and reverse gears. The steering is via pedals and by hydrostatic superimposed steering system including local steering. A four-cylinder auxiliary motor (38 HP) is used to drive the hydraulic pump and the main generator. If necessary, it can be used to drive the drive transmission or start the main motor.

The communication board with wireless device is a SE 412 model. In the crew cabin an NBC protection system and a water tank with 18-liter capacity is installed.

== Equipment ==
- 1 main winch max. 25 tons of pulling force directly, 75 tons with two pulleys, 120 m rope diameter 30 mm
- 1 auxiliary winch max. Tensile strength 400 kg, 240 m rope diameter 6 mm
- 1 crane max lifting capacity 15 tons
- Tow bars for the formation of an A-drawbar
- dozer
- various tools

== Sources ==
- Betriebsanleitung Entpannungspanzer 65 (1972) K + W (Hrsg.): Entpannungspanzer 65 Betriebsanleitung. Nur für den dienstlichen Gebrauch. Auflage von 1972. K + W (Eidgenössische Konstruktionswerkstätten) - Thun(Entpannungspanzer 65 Operating Instructions. Only for official use. Edition of 1972. K + W (Swiss design workshops) - Thun)
- Book Urs Heller: Die Panzer der schweizer Armee von 1920 bis 2008
- Military Museum Full AG Switzerland
