= MOWAG Shark =

Swiss armored personnel carrier

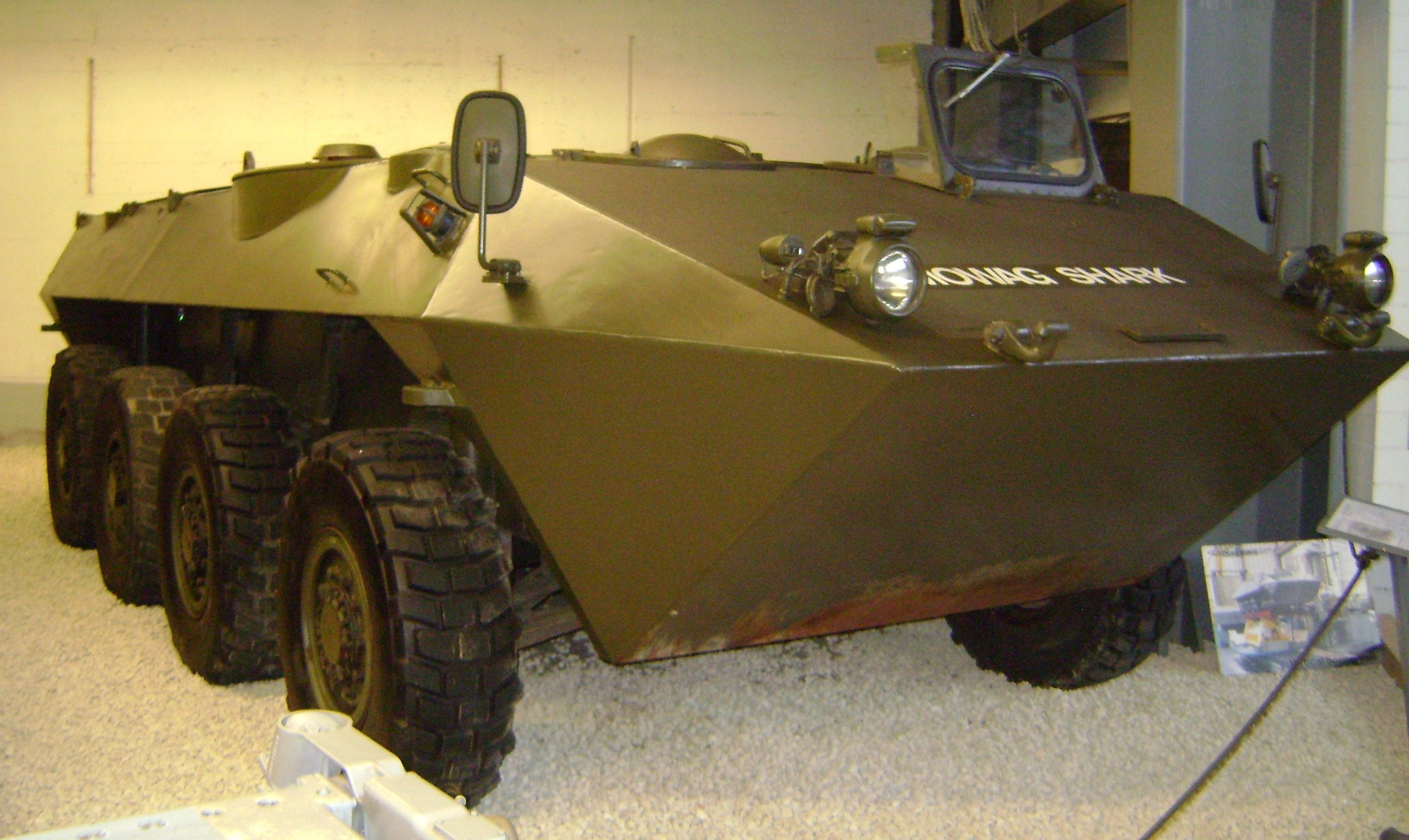
- MOWAG Shark at Militärmuseum Full Switzerland
- Place of origin: Switzerland

Production history
- Designer: MOWAG Motor Car Factory, Kreuzlingen, Switzerland
- Manufacturer: MOWAG
- Produced: 1981
- No. built: 3
- Variants: APC, Tank, AAA, Anti Tank

Specifications
- Mass: 8x8:21,000 kg (46,000 lb) (loaded); 16,000 kg (35,000 lb) (empty)
- Length: 7.52 m (24 ft 8 in)
- Width: 3 m (9 ft 10 in)
- Height: 1.9 m (6 ft 3 in)
- Crew: 3 or 4
- Main armament: 105 mm gun or 35 mm cannon, twin 30 mm SPAAG or ADATS missile system
- Secondary armament: 7.62 mm machine gun
- Engine: Detroit Diesel 8V-71T turbo-charged diesel 530 hp at 2500 rpm
- Power/weight: 25.2 hp/tonne
- Payload capacity: 2,200 kg (at protection level 2/2a); 6x6: 7,300kg
- Transmission: Allison HT 750 ORD automatic with 5 forward and 1 reverse gears
- Suspension: 8x8 wheeled, 13.00 x 20 run-flat tyres (insert)
- Ground clearance: 0.46 m (1 ft 6 in)
- Fuel capacity: 400 L (106 US gal; 88 imp gal)
- Operational range: 500 km (310 mi)
- Maximum speed: 100 km/h (62 mph)
- Steering system: 1 and 4 axle

The MOWAG Shark is an armored personnel carrier produced by the MOWAG Motor Car Factory, Kreuzlingen, Switzerland.

== Development ==
The Shark was developed by the MOWAG Company as a private venture specifically for the export market. It builds upon the Mowag Puma. It was first shown in public at the 1981 Paris Air Show fitted with the Oerlikon-Bührle Type GDD-BOE two-man turret and armed with a 35 mm cannon and a coaxial 7.62 mm machine gun. Two more prototypes were completed in mid-1983.

In 1982 the Shark was successfully tested in Switzerland, fitted with a French Fives-Gail Babcock FL-12 turret armed with a 105 mm gun and a SOPTAC fire control system. In West Germany it was successfully tested with an experimental Rheinmetall turret armed with the Rheinmetall 105 mm Rh 105-11 super low recoil gun, which fires all standard NATO tank ammunition, including the APFSDS-T.

The chassis was designed to be easily adapted to a wide range of roles, including anti-aircraft (fitted with the same turret as the Wildcat twin 30 mm SPAAG, the French Crotale (missile) or the Swiss Air Defense Anti-Tank System (ADATS) missile system), anti-tank (including missile), fire support, reconnaissance, and rocket launcher. Late in 1983 one Shark prototype was fitted with the one-man turret of the Wildcat twin 30 mm SPAAG system and this was tested in Canada early in 1984. Wherever possible, proven assemblies for components such as the engine and transmission were used to simplify both training and logistics. In 1988 the Shark was tested with the Bofor Trinity turret in Germany to make a final attempt to sell the chassis to Austria and any other country who could find interest in the chassis. This test done in Germany was no longer successful on the international market but showed the versatility of the shark once more.

The MOWAG Shark never went into production. As an alternative, MOWAG build the 10x10Piranha. One of the Shark prototypes is now part of the Military Museum Full in Switzerland.

== Description ==
The hull of the MOWAG Shark is of all-welded steel construction which provides complete protection up to and including the Soviet 14.5 mm KPV armor-piercing round. According to the manufacturer, a 155 mm HE projectile landing ten meters away from the vehicle will cause no damage. The driver sits at the front of the hull on the left side and has a single-piece hatch cover that opens to the left. Forward of this are three periscopes. The centre one can be replaced by an image intensification periscope for driving at night. A second crew member can be seated to the right of the driver, or the space can be used for special equipment such as an NBC pack or for additional ammunition stowage.

The fighting compartment is in the centre of the vehicle. A wide range of armament installations can be fitted, up to and including an FL-12 turret with a 105 mm gun as also used on the Austrian Steyr-Daimler-Puck SK-105 Kürassier light tank/tank destroyer. The engine, transmission, and fuel tanks are at the rear of the hull. Engine access panels are provided in the top of the engine compartment. The air inlet louvers are in the top of the hull, one either side, while the air outlets are located at the rear of the hull. Steering is power assisted at the front. The rear axles and vertical suspension travel 420 mm. A wide range of optional equipment can be fitted to the Shark, including various types of NBC systems, passive night vision equipment, and fire-extinguishing systems.

== Specifications ==
- Axis of fire (105 mm gun): 2.16 m
- Ground clearance: 0.46 m
- Track: 2.62 m
- Wheelbase: 1.51 m + 1.4 m + 1.49 m
- Angle of approach/departure: 40°/45°
- Fording: 1.3 m
- Gradient: 60%
- Side slope: 35%
- Vertical obstacle: 0.46 m
- Trench: 2.3 m
- Turning circle: 12.5 m
- Suspension (1st and 4th axles) : coil springs with wishbone (2nd and 3rd axles) torsion bars (all wheels have hydraulic shock absorbers)
- Brakes (main): dual circuit, hydraulic, air assisted. (Parking): spring-loaded brake cylinder. (Engine): Jacobs brake system
- Electrical system: 24 volts
